= Republic of Karelia =

First-level administrative division of Russia

Republic of Karelia Республика Карелия (Russian)
- Republic

Other transcription(s)
  - Karelian: Karjalan tašavalta
  - Vepsian: Karjalan tazovaldkund
  - Finnish: Karjalan tasavalta
  - Livvi: Karjalan tazavaldu
  - Lydic: Karjalan tazavald
- Flag Coat of arms
- Anthem: Anthem of the Republic of Karelia
- Interactive map of Republic of Karelia
- Coordinates: 63°49′N 33°00′E
- Country: Russia
- Federal district: Northwestern
- Economic region: Northern
- Established: June 27, 1923; July 16, 1956; November 13, 1991
- Capital: Petrozavodsk

Government
  - Body: Legislative Assembly
  - Head: Artur Parfenchikov

Area
  - Total: 180,520 km^{2} (69,700 sq mi)
  - Rank: 20th

Population (2021 census)
  - Total: 533,121: 86.4% Russians; 5.5% Karelians; 2.0% Belarusians; 1.2% Ukrainians; 0.7% Finns; 0.5% Vespians; 3.7% other
  - Estimate (2018): 622,484
  - Rank: 70th
  - Density: 2.9533/km^{2} (7.6489/sq mi)
  - Urban: 79.5%
  - Rural: 20.5%

GDP (nominal, 2024)
  - Total: ₽434 billion (US$5.89 billion)
  - Per capita: ₽825,856 (US$11,213.25)
- Time zone: UTC+3 (UTC+03:00)
- ISO 3166 code: RU-KR
- License plates: 10
- OKTMO ID: 86000000
- Official languages: Russian
- Recognised languages: Karelian, Veps, Finnish
- Website: www.gov.karelia.ru

The Republic of Karelia, (Note: Russian: Респу́блика Каре́лия, romanized: Respublika Kareliya; Russian pronunciation: [rʲɪˈspublʲɪkə kɐˈrʲelʲɪ(j)ə]; Karelian: Karjalan tašavalta; Finnish: Karjalan tasavalta; Veps: Karjalan Tazovaldkund; Livvi: Karjalan tazavaldu; Ludic: Kard’alan tazavald) or simply Karelia or Karjala (Note: Karelian: Karjala; Russian: Каре́лия, Ка́рьяла) is a republic of Russia situated in the northwest of the country. The republic is a part of the Northwestern Federal District, and covers an area of 172,400 square kilometres (66,600 square miles), with a population of 533,121 residents. Its capital is Petrozavodsk.

The modern Karelian Republic was founded as an autonomous republic within the Russian SFSR, by the Resolution of the Presidium of the All-Russian Central Executive Committee (VTsIK) on 27 June 1923 and by the Decree of the VTsIK and the Council of People's Commissars of 25 July 1923, from the Karelian Labour Commune. From 1940 to 1956, it was known as the Karelo-Finnish Soviet Socialist Republic, one of the republics of the Soviet Union. In 1956, it was once again made an autonomous republic and remained part of Russia following the dissolution of the Soviet Union in 1991.

== Etymology ==
"Karelia" derives from the name of the ethnic group — Karelians. The name "Karjala" has unknown origins, but it is theorised that it may come from the Proto-Finnic word karja, meaning "herd", which was borrowed from the Proto-Germanic harjaz ("army"); the ending -la means "earth".

== Geography ==
The Republic of Karelia is in the northwestern part of Russia, between Lake Ladoga and the White Sea, which has a shoreline of 630 kilometers (390 mi). The republic has an area of 172,400 km^{2} (66,600 sq mi). It shares internal borders with Murmansk Oblast (north), Arkhangelsk Oblast (east/south-east), Vologda Oblast (south-east/south), and Leningrad Oblast (south/south-west), and it also borders Finland (Kainuu, Lapland, North Karelia, Northern Ostrobothnia, and South Karelia); the borders measure 723 km. The main bodies of water next to Karelia are the White Sea (an inlet of the Barents Sea) to the north-east and Lake Onega and Lake Ladoga both shared with neighboring Oblasts to the south. Its highest point is the Nuorunen peak at 576 m (1,890 ft).

=== Geology ===
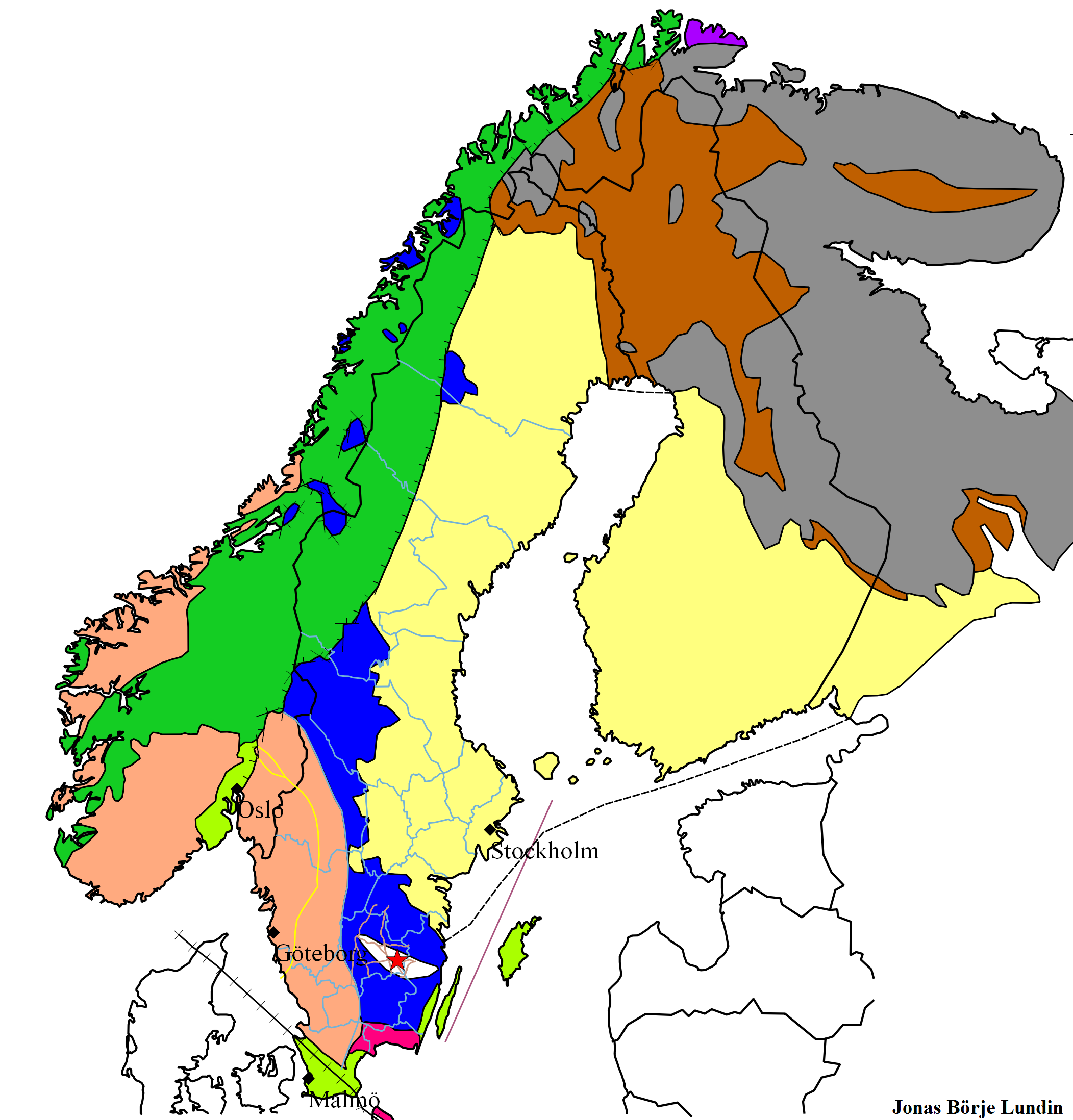
A geological map of Fennoscandia: Archean rocks of the Karelia, Belomorian, and Kola domains Proterozoic rocks of the Karelia and Kola domains Svecofennian Domain Transscandinavian Igneous Belt Timanide Orogen Sveconorwegian Domain inc. the Western Gneiss Region Caledonian nappes

As a part of the Fennoscandian Shield's ancient Karelian craton, most of the Republic of Karelia's surficial geology is Archaean or Paleoproterozoic, dated up to 3.4 billion years in the Vodlozero block. This area is the largest contiguous Archaean outcrop in Europe and one of the largest in the world.

Since deglaciation, the rate of post-glacial rebound in the Republic of Karelia has varied. Since the White Sea connected to the World's oceans uplift along the southern coast of Kandalaksha Gulf has totaled 90 m. In the interval 9,500–5,000 years ago the uplift rate was 9–13 mm/yr. Before the Atlantic period, uplift rate had decreased to 5–5.5 mm/yr, to then rise briefly before arriving at the present uplift rate is 4 mm/yr.

=== Rivers ===
There are about 27,000 rivers in Karelia. Major rivers include:

- Vodla River (Karelian: Vodlajogi; Finnish: Vodlajoki)
- Kem River (Karelian: Kemijogi; Finnish: Kemijoki)
- Kovda River (Karelian and Finnish: Koutajoki)
- Shuya River (Karelian: Šuojogi; Finnish: Suojoki)
- Suna River (Karelian: Suunujogi; Finnish: Suunujoki)
- Vyg River (Karelian and Finnish: Uikujoki)

=== Lakes ===
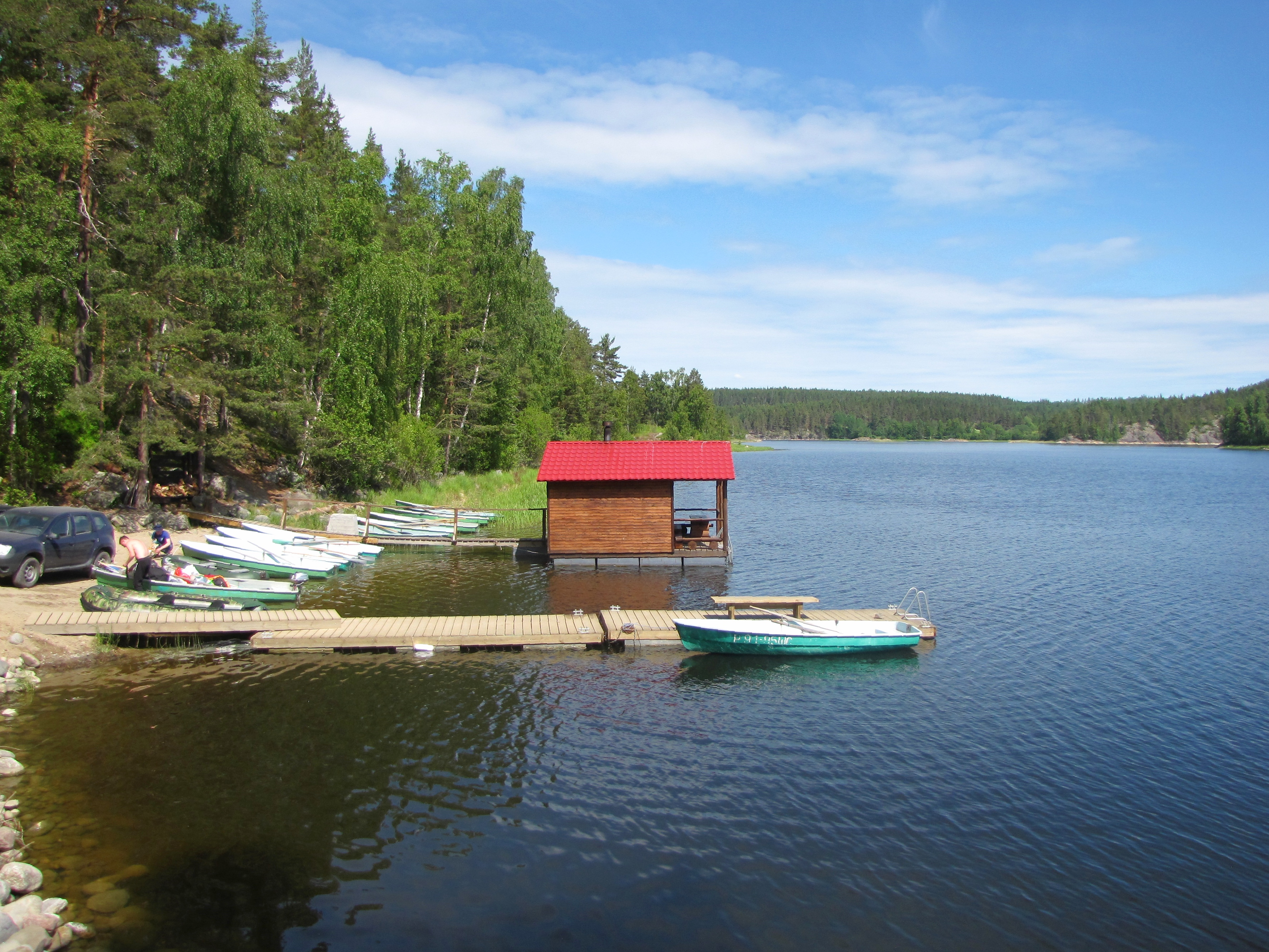
A lake in the Republic of Karelia

There are 61,000 lakes in Karelia. The total water surface of the lakes is 16.2 thousand km² (10.3% of the territory), or 17.8 thousand km² (11.4% of the territory) if reservoirs are included. Lake Ladoga (Karelian: Luadogu; Finnish: Laatokka) and Lake Onega (Karelian: Oniegujärvi; Finnish: Ääninen) are the largest lakes in Europe. Other lakes include:

- Nyukozero (Karelian and Finnish: Nuokkijärvi)
- Pyaozero (Karelian: Piäjärvi; Finnish: Pääjärvi)
- Segozero (Karelian and Finnish: Seesjärvi)
- Syamozero (Karelian: Siämärvi; Finnish: Säämäjärvi)
- Topozero (Karelian and Finnish Tuoppajärvi)
- Vygozero (Karelian and Finnish Uikujärvi)

The lakes Ladoga and Onega are located in the south of the republic.

=== Islands ===
White Sea coast:

- Oleniy Island
- Chernetskiye Island
- Kamestrov Island
- Kuzova Archipelago
- Shuy Island
- Kutulda Island
- Perkhludy Island
- Lesnaya Osinka Island
- Kotkano Island
- Vygnvolok Island
- Tumishche Island
- Sum Island
- Razostrov Island
- Sedostrov Island
- Myagostrov Island
- Zhuzhmuy Islands
- Kondostrov Island

In Lake Onega:

- Bolshoy Klimenetsky Island

In Lake Ladoga:

- Vossinovsari Island
- Valaam Island
- Mantsinsaari Island
- Lunkulansaari Island

=== National parks ===
- Vodlozero National Park
- Kalevala National Park
- Paanajärvi National Park

=== Natural resources ===
The majority of the republic's territory (148,000 km^{2} (57,000 sq mi), or 85%) is composed of state forest stock. The total growing stock of timber resources in the forests of all categories and ages is 807 million m³. The mature and over-mature tree stock amounts to 411.8 million m³, of which 375.2 million m³ is coniferous.

Fifty useful minerals are found in Karelia, located in more than 400 deposits and ore-bearing layers. Natural resources of the republic include iron ore, diamonds, vanadium, molybdenum, and others.

=== Climate ===
The Republic of Karelia is located in the Atlantic continental climate zone. The average temperature in January is −8.0 °C (17.6 °F) and +16.4 °C (61.5 °F) in July. Average annual precipitation is 500–700 mm.

== Administrative divisions ==
The Republic of Karelia includes 18 administrative-territorial units, including:

- 2 city okrugs
- 5 municipal okrugs
- 11 districts (including 3 national districts)

There are 818 settlements in the Republic of Karelia, including:

- 13 cities
- 11 urban-type settlements
- 794 settlements and villages

== International cooperation ==
=== Northern Dimension Project ===
In 2000, the EU Summit approved the Northern Dimension project, which aimed to gradually develop a consolidated strategy for intercountry and interregional cooperation in Northern Europe, including the Russian northern regions of Karelia, the Komi Republic, Murmansk, Kaliningrad, Arkhangelsk, Vologda, Pskov, and Leningrad Oblasts, St. Petersburg, and the Nenets Autonomous Okrug.

The Republic of Karelia promotes international cultural and economic cooperation with the provinces and unions of communes of Finland, the Swedish province (Västerbotten), the Norwegian municipality (Tromsø), the state of the United States of America (Vermont), the voivodeship of Poland (Chekhanovo), the autonomous republic of Georgia (Adjara), the prefecture of Greece (Ilia), the Republic of Belarus, the province of Fujian (Eastern China), and the region of Abai in the Republic of Kazakhstan.

== History ==
=== Middle ages ===
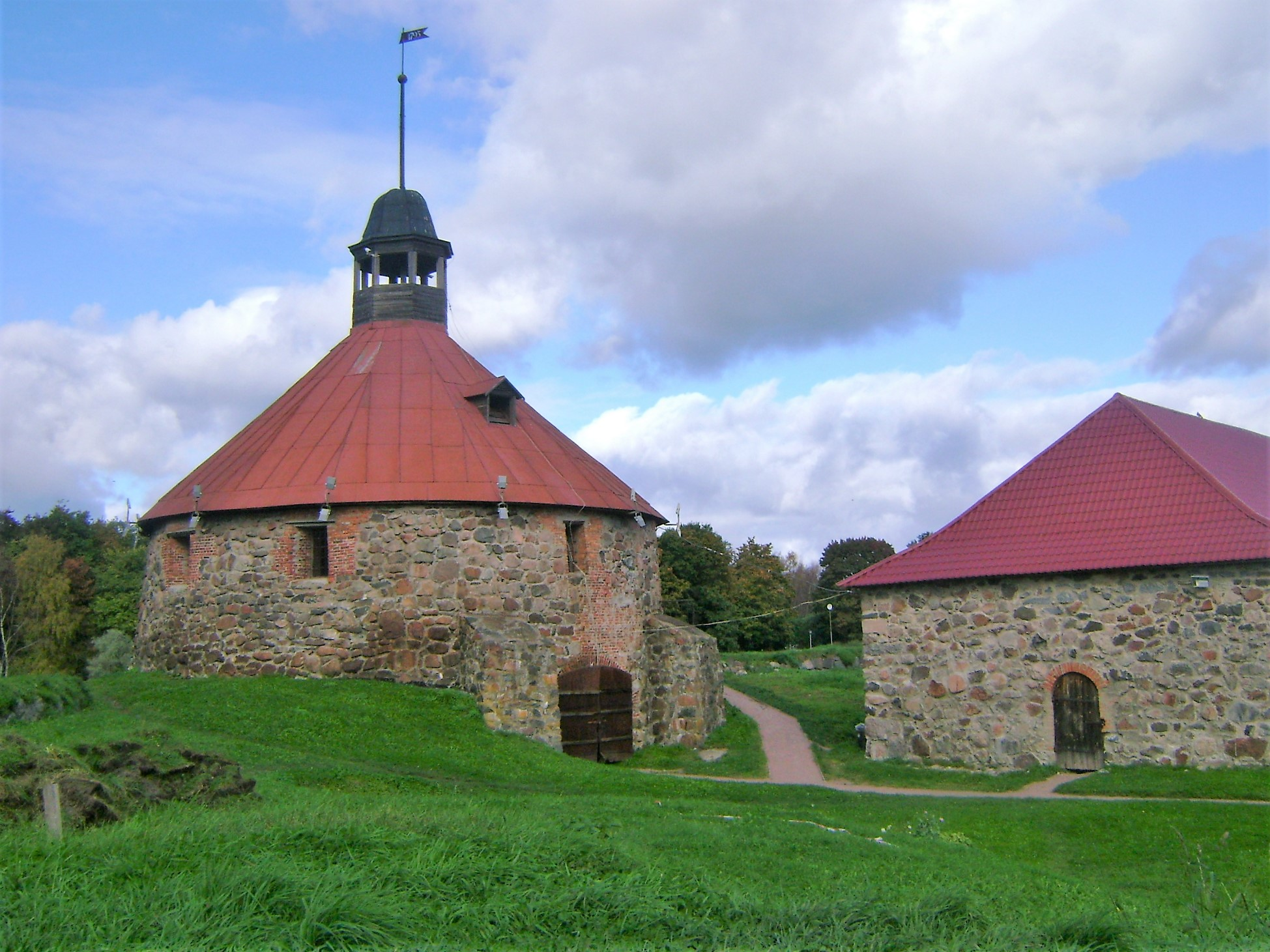
Korela Fort

The Karelian people and culture developed during the Viking Age in the region to the west of Lake Ladoga. Karelians were first mentioned in Swedish sagas around the 10th century. Russians first mentioned Karelians in 1143, they called Karelians "Korela".

Sweden's interest in Karelia began a centuries-long struggle with Novgorod (later Russia) that resulted in numerous border changes following the many wars fought between the two, the most famous of which is the Pillage of Sigtuna of 1187. In 1137 the oldest documented settlement was established, the modern-day city of Olonets (Aunus). Karelians converted to Orthodox Christianity in 1227. The Karelians' alliance with Novgorod developed into domination by the latter in the 13th century, when Karelia became a part of Novgorod under the name of Obonezhie pyatina as an autonomy. Later Karelia had anti-Novgorod revolts in the 13th and 14th centuries. Later Karelia became a part of Muscovy when Novgorod was annexed in the second half of the 15th century.

=== Modern era ===
During the Great Northern War (1700–1721) the modern-day capital of Karelia, the city of Petrozavodsk, was founded as a cannon factory by Peter the Great.

=== 19th century ===
On 9(21) September 1801 Olonets Governorate was created by order of Alexander I.

After Russian emperor Alexander I became the Grand Duke of Finland following the Finnish War, he transferred Old Finland to the newly formed Grand Duchy of Finland in 1812. This move was regarded as a means of securing support of the Finnish nobility for the Russian emperor.

=== Early 20th century ===
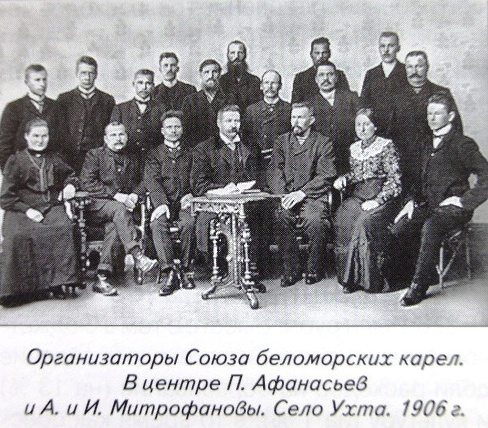
Union of White Sea Karelians

In 1906, the Union of White Sea Karelians (Vienan karjalaisten liitto) was created. The Union's main goal was to improve the life of the common Karelians and additionally develop their own national identity. The union was temporarily dissolved in 1911 after series of repressions done by the local government.

In 1917, the Murmansk Railroad was built, leading to the Karelian lands becoming more strategically important. This led much of intelligentsia to believe that the Russian tourism and immigration into the region would rise, leading to further assimilation of the Karelians to the Russian culture.

=== Civil War ===
During the Finnish and the Russian Civil Wars the local peasantry rebelled against the new Soviet State due its Prodrazverstka policy, causing several squads of the "Whiteguard" to cross into the Karelian lands, where then was organized a government that later swiftly declared independence from the Russian Soviet Federative Republic, creating the Uhtua Republic. Later in 1920 Finnish forces occupied Olonets, creating another puppet government, which then merged with the other Karelian state into the United Karelian Government. The regions were reclaimed by the Red Army later the same year, the Tartu peace was signed and the Karelian United Government was dissolved.

Similar to other ethnically non-Russian states within RSFSR, the Karelia would receive autonomy within RSFSR, establishing the Karelian Labour Commune on 8 June 1920, which enjoyed a large de-facto autonomy approved by Lenin in early 1921.

In 1921, an uprising was started by the Forest Guerrillas in an attempt to gain control over Karelia yet again, but it was defeated by the Soviets shortly after.

During the years of its existence, the Commune was actively educating the people, opening the schools and libraries as of the Likbez policy were open and maintained, the Commune was later expanded in 1923 by transferring the Kolezhemskaya, Lapinskaya, Navodnitskaya and many other posads from Arkhangelsk Governorate.

In 1923, the Karelian Labour Commune became the Karelian Autonomous Soviet Socialist Republic due its de-facto large autonomy, with the government of the region directly managing the local economy without having to pay its taxes to the RSFSR's state budget. The formal increase of the autonomy was first vetoed by People's Commissar for Nationalities of the RSFSR, but it was later accepted by the Central Committee of the Communist Party of the Soviet Union.

=== Karelian Autonomous Soviet Socialist Republic ===
After the Likbez policy was fulfilled, the Republic now shifted its goal from educating the people to expanding the production and electrifying the Republic according to the GOELRO plan. The first steps were the creation of Mevezegorsky and Pudozsky tree-cutting factories, the Kondopoga Paper Factory, and the launch of the Kem and the Uhta hydroelectrostations.

In the 1930s, the goal yet again shifted, now to improving the cultural and physical development and well-being of the locals by creation of many free clinics and hospitals, "Houses of Physical Culture", Theaters etc.

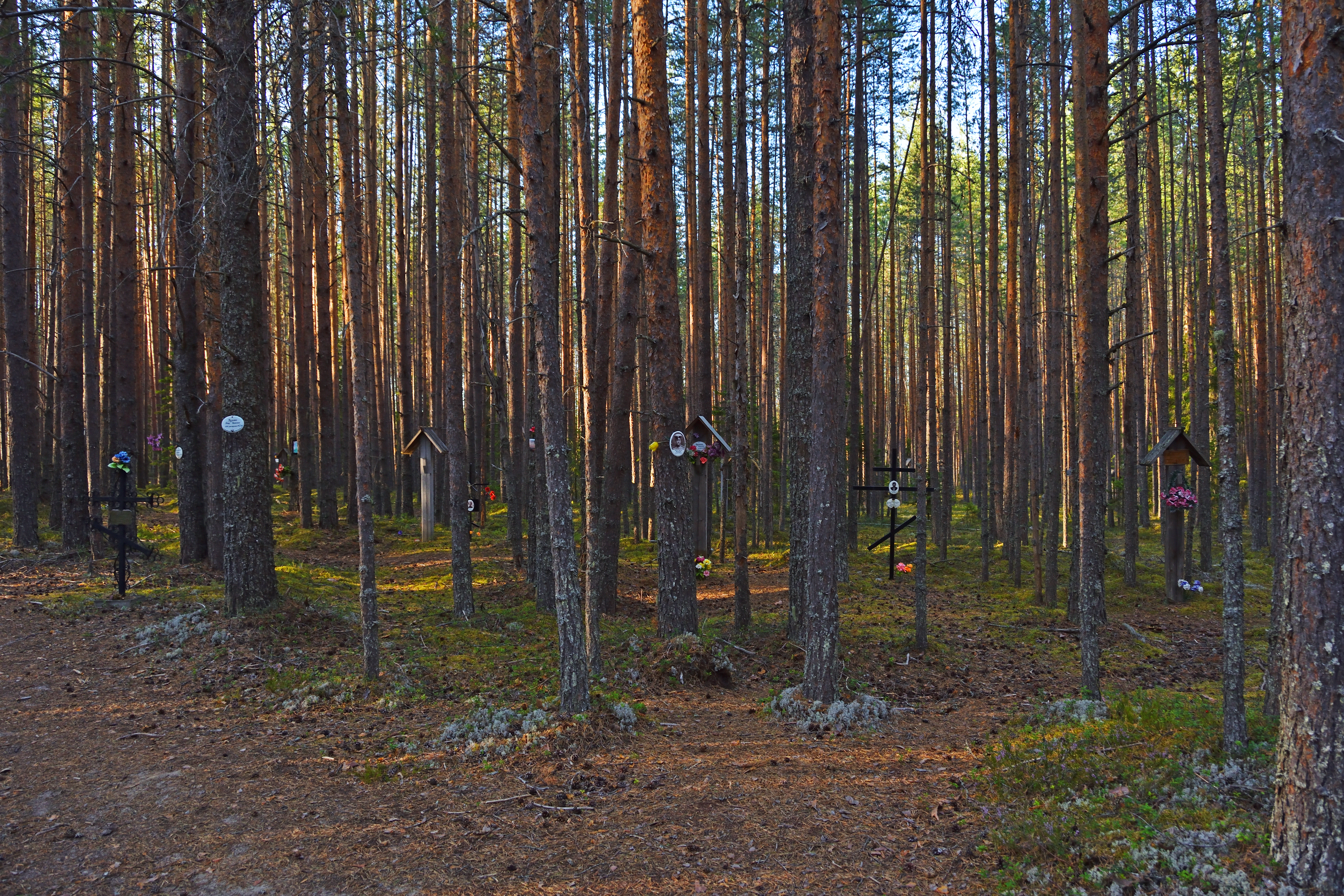
Sandarmokh forest

Many of the Finns who fled to Karelia were detained and most likely shot during The Great Purge of 1937, with the Karelian ethnic Finns' population dropping to 21%. Karelia has one of the biggest burial sites of Stalinist purges in Russia, Sandarmokh, where possibly thousands of victims were executed.

=== Winter War ===
During the Winter War, a Soviet puppet government was created in occupied territories. The Finnish Democratic Republic was to incorporate Finland, plus some western parts of the KASSR. Some members of the FDP government were also members of the KASSR government.

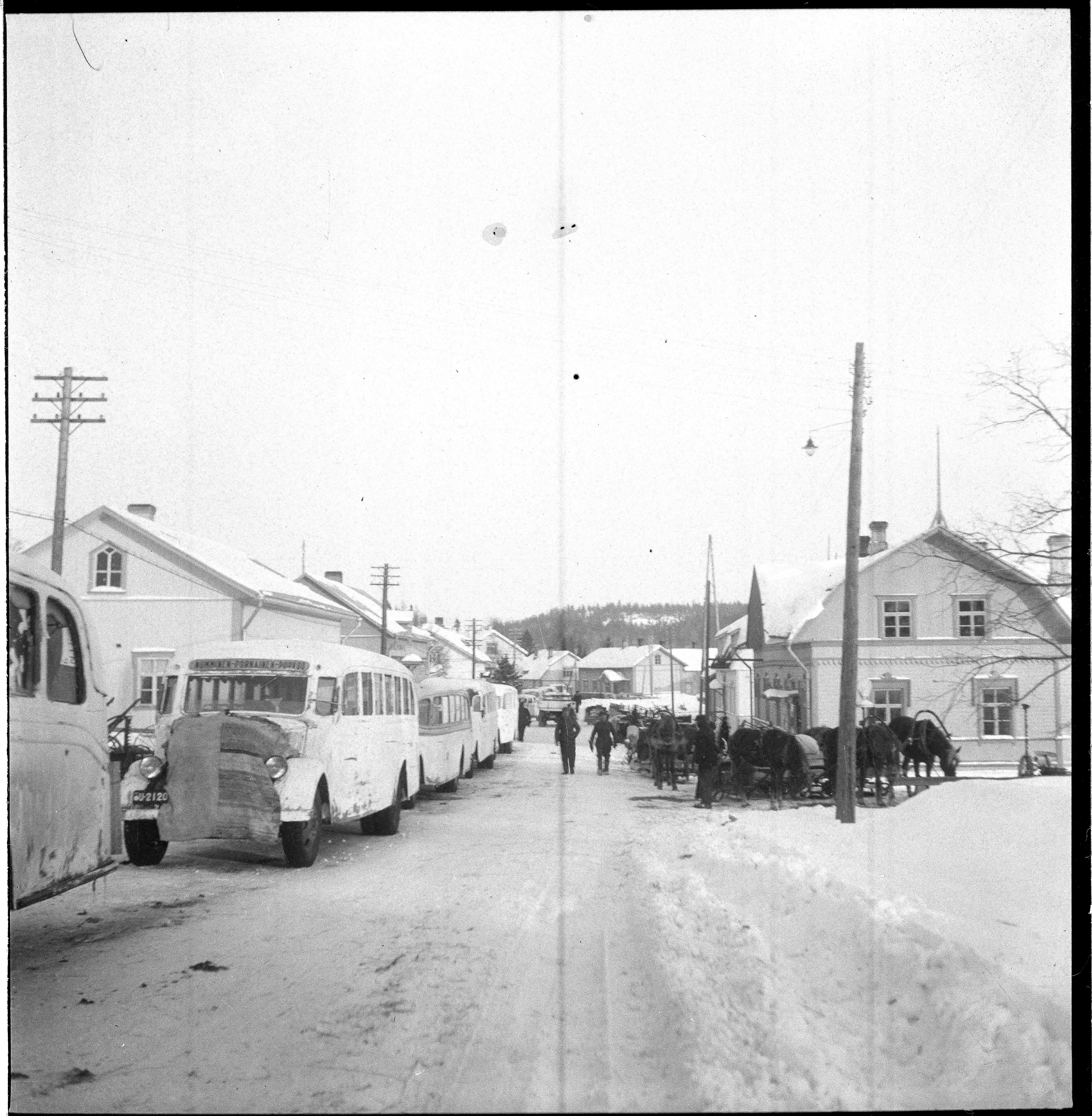
Evacuation from Kurkijoki, near Lahdenpohja

After the Moscow Peace Treaty territories of the Karelian Isthmus were transferred to the newly created Karelo-Finnish Soviet Socialist Republic. After the evacuation of Finnish Karelia, the new territories were left unpopulated, so migrants from Belarus, Ukraine, Russia, and other Soviet republics moved in. To this day, this area has one of the lowest percentages of Karelian and Finnish populations in the Republic.

=== World War II ===
After the beginning of World War II, mass rallies were held on the territory of the republic, at which the inhabitants of Karelia declared their readiness to stand up for the defense of the Soviet Union. Workers of the Onega Tractor Plant wrote "We will work only in such a way as to fully meet the needs of our Red Army. We will double, triple our forces and crush, destroy the German fascists".

On 25 June 1941, after the German army crossed Zapadnaya Dvina, Soviet Bomber planes bombed Finland 25 of June 1941, after which Finnish prime minister Jukka Ragnell announced that Finland is at war with the Soviet Union. The Finnish army crossed the Soviet border on 1 July.

Soon after the evacuation of border regions began, On 3 July, a republican evacuation commission was created. At its first meeting, it was decided to evacuate children under 14 out of Petrozavodsk. The same decision also refers to the evacuation of 150 families of leading party and Soviet workers in Karelia. Those residents who could work had to remain in the harvest and defense work.

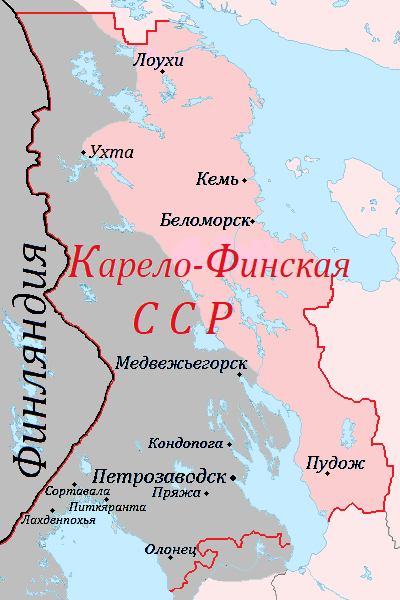
In grey, Finnish occupied territories

By September the Finnish army already reached Petrozavodsk and captured Olonets. Petrozavodsk offensive began on 20 September. To protect the city, the 7th Army under the command of General K.A. Meretskov was directly subordinated to the Headquarters of the Supreme Commander.

On 30 September, the position of the defenders of the city deteriorated sharply. The Finnish army managed to break through Soviet defenses and cut the highway to Kondopoga in the area of the Sulazhgorsky brick factory. In the south Finns came close to the city outskirts. On 1 October, due to the threat of encirclement, an order was received from the command to withdraw the main units defending the city.

The fighting near Petrozavodsk allowed the authorities to evacuate most of the civilian population and a significant part of the production capacities. In total, more than 500 thousand people were evacuated from the republic to the east. Petrozavodsk University was temporarily relocated to Syktyvkar.

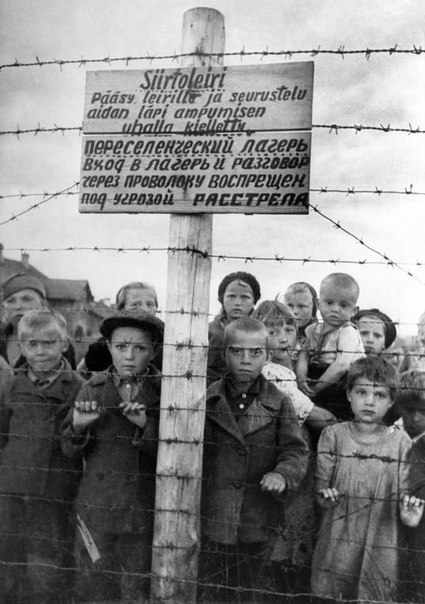
Wartime concentration camp in Petrozavodsk under the Finnish military administration in Eastern Karelia

After the capture of Petrozavodsk, the capital of Soviet Karelia was transferred first to Medvezhyegorsk, then to Belomorsk. Less than 90 thousand people remained in the occupied territory, half of which are representatives of the Finno-Ugric peoples: Karelians, Vepsians, and Finns. The Finnish administration has officially recognized them as a "kindred" population. The rest received the status of "unrelated" people. Most of them have been put into concentration camps, along with communists and people who could not speak Finnish or Karelian.

Former prisoners of the camps recalled that the staff often treated them more harshly than was supposed to according to the instructions. According to them, the Finns, in the presence of children, shot prisoners and beat women, children, and the elderly. One of the prisoners told the Finnish historian Helga Seppel that before leaving Petrozavodsk, the invaders shot several young people for unknown reasons.

During the occupation, Petrozavodsk was renamed to Äänislinna.

Only a few territories of the K-FSSR managed to escape the Finnish occupation: the Belomorsky, Loukhsky, Kemsky, Pudozhsky okrugs, as well as part of the Medvezhiegorsky, Tungudsky and Ukhta okrugs. By 1942, about 70 thousand people lived here.

After the end of the Siege of Leningrad Soviet army was ordered to liberate Karelia.

On 21 June 1944 Svir-Petrozavodsk operation started. On 27 June the Finnish army left Petrozavodsk. By August the Soviet army reached pre-war borders.

The Moscow Armistice was signed on 19 September 1944, ending the Continuation War, resulting in Finland ceding the Karelian Isthmus and Ladoga Karelia to the USSR.

=== Post-war ===
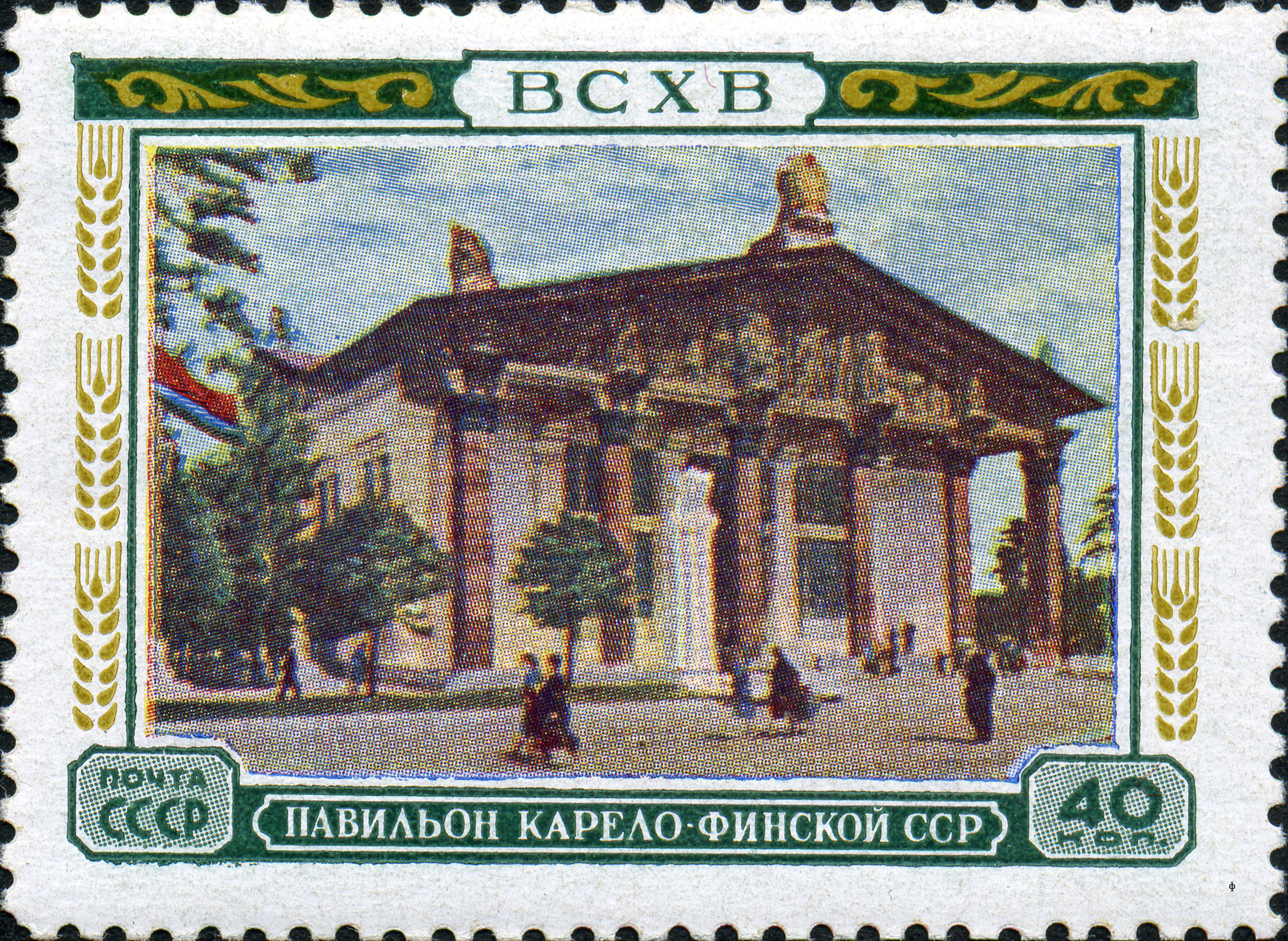
KFSSR building on VDNkH

After the end of World War II, the Karelian Isthmus was incorporated into the Leningrad Oblast and the city of Alakurtti was transferred to Murmansk Oblast.

After normalization of diplomatic relations between USSR and Finland the status of the Karelo-Finnish SSR was changed back to the Karelian ASSR in 1956. After this Karelian, Veps, and Finnish languages began a decline in usage due to the lack of support from the state and lack of education.

The transformation of the KFSSR into the Karelian ASSR was supposed to show that the USSR did not have aggressive goals against Finland.

In 1978, a Korean Air Lines Boeing 707-321B was shot down over Murmansk Oblast and landed near Louhi.

=== Present-day ===
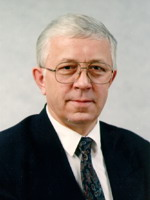
Viktor Stepanov, first leader of Post-Soviet Karelia

- In August 1990 KASSR declared its sovereignty as an autonomous part of the Russian Federation, and later changed its name to the Republic of Karelia in 1991.
- In 2004 Veps National Volost was transferred to Prionezhsky District.
- In 2006 an ethnic conflict and later riot started in Kondopoga after a fight between locals and Caucasian immigrants led to 2 deaths. This caused an exodus of Muslims from Karelia.
- In 2011 a plane crashed near the village of Besovets killing 47 people.

== Politics ==
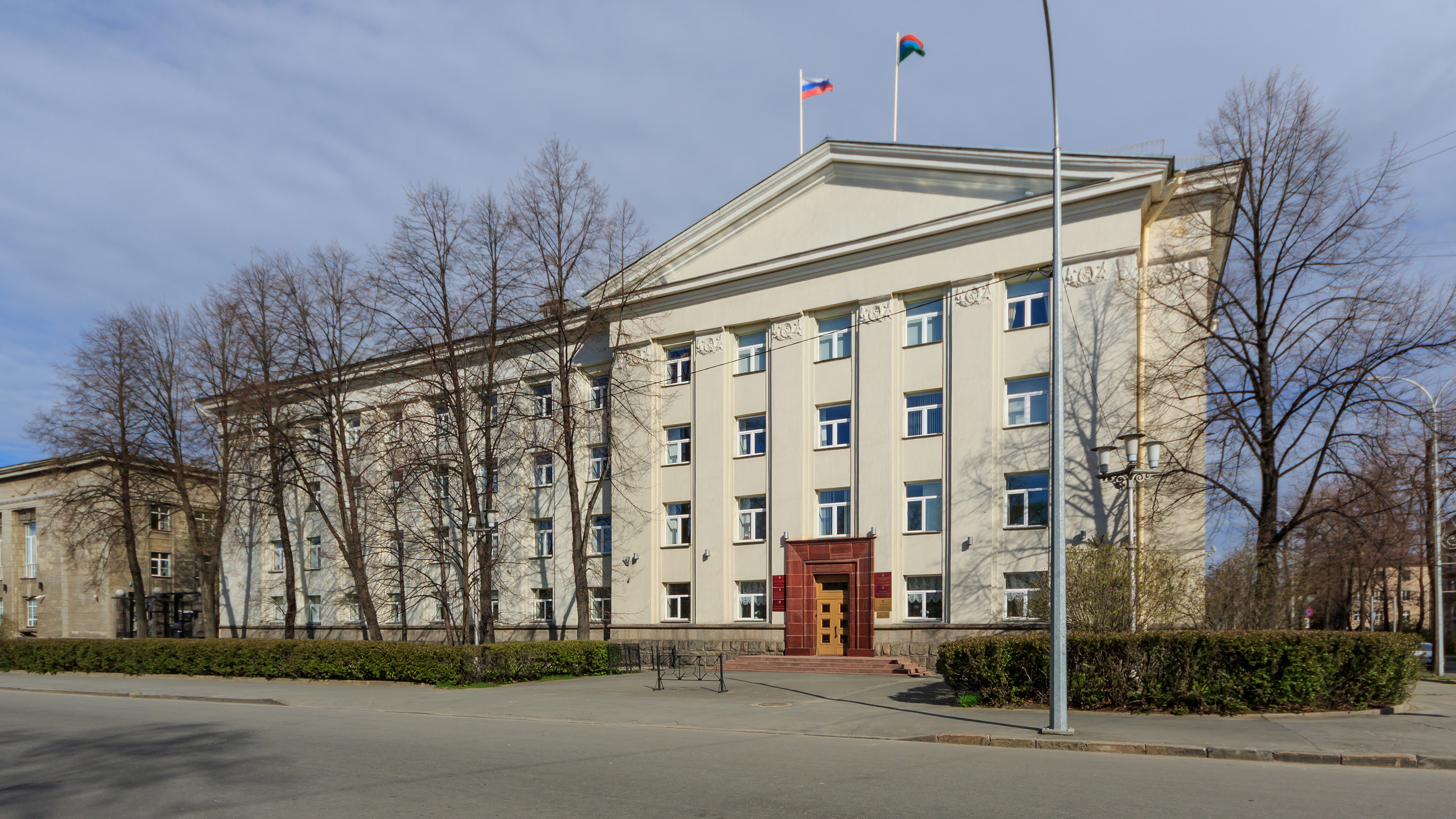
The building of the Legislative Assembly in Petrozavodsk

The highest executive authority in the Republic of Karelia is the Head of the Republic. The acting Head of the Republic is Artur Parfenchikov, who was elected in February 2017 and later re-elected in 2022.

The parliament of the Republic of Karelia is the Legislative Assembly comprising fifty deputies elected for a four-year term.

The Constitution of the Republic of Karelia was adopted on 12 February 2001.

=== Legislature ===
The Legislative Assembly of the Republic of Karelia is a permanent representative and the only legislative body of state power in the Republic of Karelia. Since 2016, it consists of 36 deputies elected by the inhabitants of the republic according to a mixed electoral system: 18 deputies according to party lists (proportional system), and 18 in single-member districts (majority system) based on universal, equal and direct suffrage by secret ballot. The term of office of deputies of one convocation is five years.

The 7th convocation was elected in September 2021 and will last until 2026. Of the 36 deputies, 22 are from United Russia, 4 from the Communist Party of the Russian Federation, 2 from the Liberal Democratic Party of Russia, 4 from A Just Russia, 2 from Yabloko, 1 from New People, and 1 from the Party of Pensioners. Elissan Shandalovich (United Russia) was elected Chairman. Igor Zubarev (United Russia) was elected representative of the Legislative Assembly in the Federation Council.

=== Executive ===
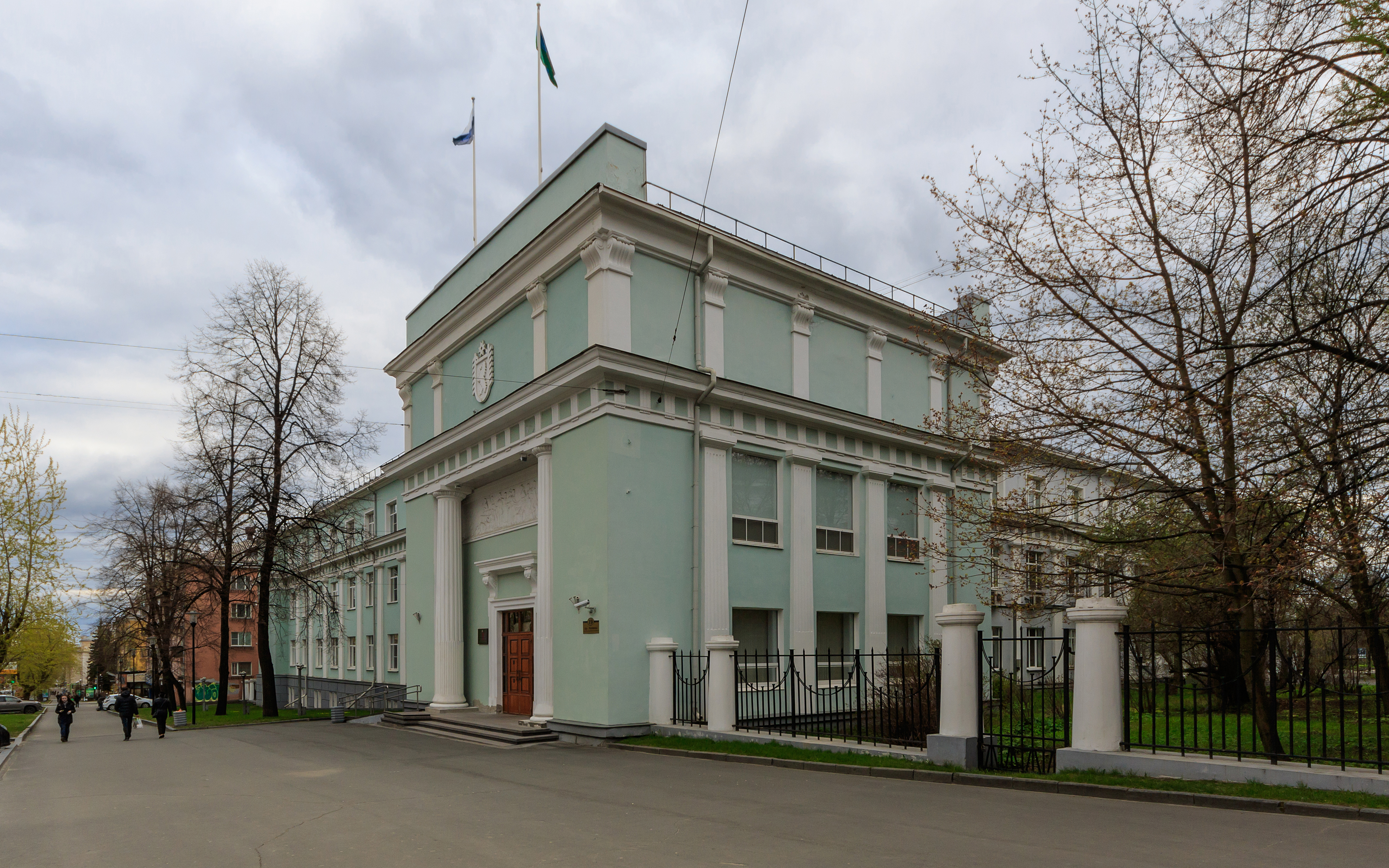
Government building in Petrozavodsk

Executive power is exercised by:

- The Head of the Republic of Karelia – the highest official of the Republic of Karelia
- the Government of the Republic of Karelia, headed by the Head of the Republic – the permanent supreme executive body of state power of the Republic of Karelia
- other executive authorities

The Head of the Republic is elected by the republic's inhabitants on the basis of universal, equal, and direct suffrage by secret ballot. The term of office is 5 years and one person cannot hold office for more than two consecutive terms.

The current head of the republic is Artur Parfenchikov (appointed by President Vladimir Putin on 15 February 2017; on 10 September 2017, he was elected in the elections from the United Russia party). Alexander Rakitin has been appointed as the representative in the Federation Council.

=== Representatives in the Federal Assembly ===
Like every federal subject, Karelia has two representatives in the Federation Council: one from the legislative assembly and one from the republic's government.

Representative	Branch of power	Appointed by	Title (at the time of promotion)	Term of office	Position in the Federation Council
Igor Zubarev	legislative	27 deputies of the legislative assembly of the 7th convocation,	Deputy of the Legislative Assembly of Karelia of the 7th convocation, United Russia; member of the Federation Council in 2016–2021	5 years, from 6 October 2021 to September 2026	member of the committee on agrarian and food policy and environmental management
Vladimir Chizhov	executive	Artur Parfenchikov	Permanent Representative of the Russian Federation to the European Union	5 years, from 27 September 2022 to September 2027	First Deputy Chairman of the Defense and Security Committee

=== Political parties ===
As of 1 March 2010, seven Russian political parties had their branches in the Republic of Karelia: United Russia, Communist Party of the Russian Federation, Patriots of Russia, A Just Russia, Liberal Democratic Party of Russia, Yabloko, and Right Cause. The socio-political movement of the Russian People's Democratic Union also has its own branch.

== Demographics ==
Population: 533,121 (2021 census); 643,548 (2010 census); 645,205 (2002 census); 791,317 (1989 Soviet census).

=== Settlements ===
Largest cities or towns in the Republic of Karelia 2010 Russian Census
Rank		Administrative Division	Pop.
1	Petrozavodsk	City of republic significance of Petrozavodsk	261,987
2	Kondopoga	Kondopozhsky District	32,987
3	Segezha	Segezhsky District	29,631
4	Kostomuksha	Town of republic significance of Kostomuksha	28,436
5	Sortavala	Town of republic significance of Sortavala	19,235
6	Medvezhyegorsk	Medvezhyegorsky District	15,533
7	Kem	Kemsky District	13,051
8	Pitkyaranta	Pitkyarantsky District	11,429
9	Belomorsk	Belomorsky District	11,217
10	Suoyarvi	Suoyarvsky District	9,766

=== Vital statistics ===
Historical population
Year	Pop.	±%
1926	269,734	—
1959	651,346	+141.5%
1970	713,451	+9.5%
1979	736,022	+3.2%
1989	791,317	+7.5%
2002	716,281	−9.5%
2010	643,548	−10.2%
2021	533,121	−17.2%
2025	518,644	−2.7%
Source: Census data, estimate

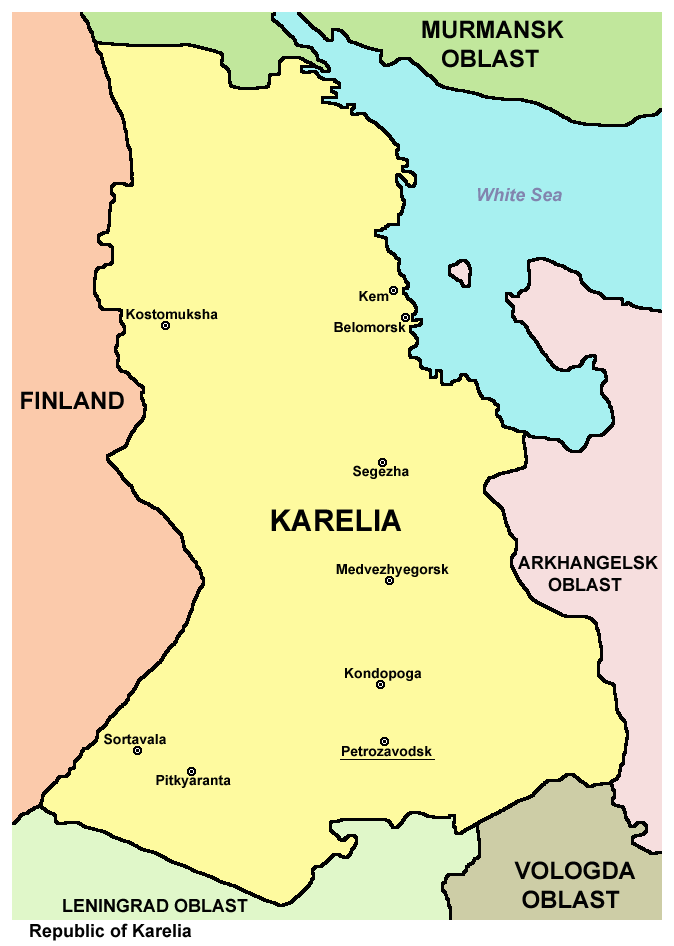
Largest cities of the Republic of Karelia.

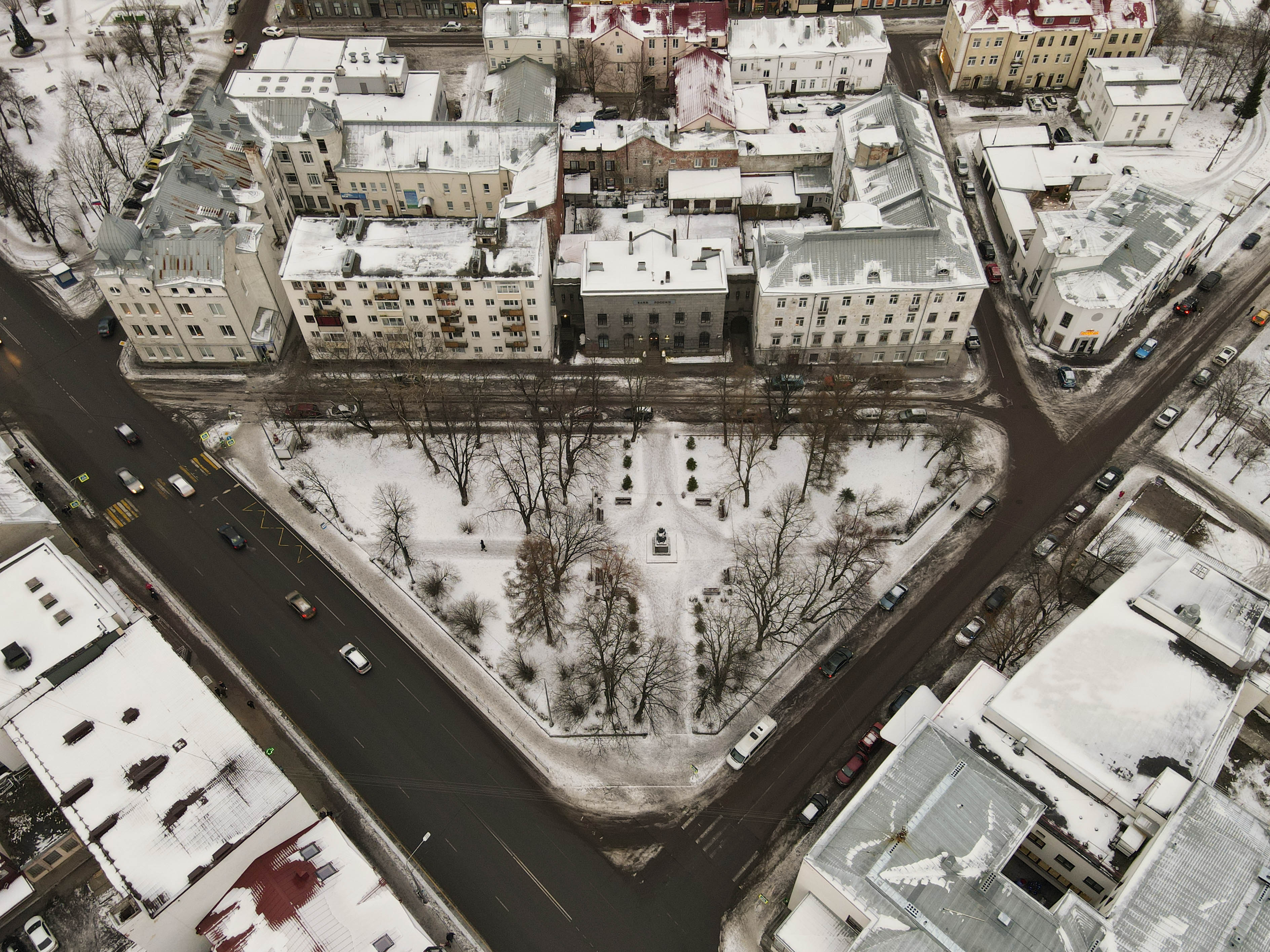
Sortavala town

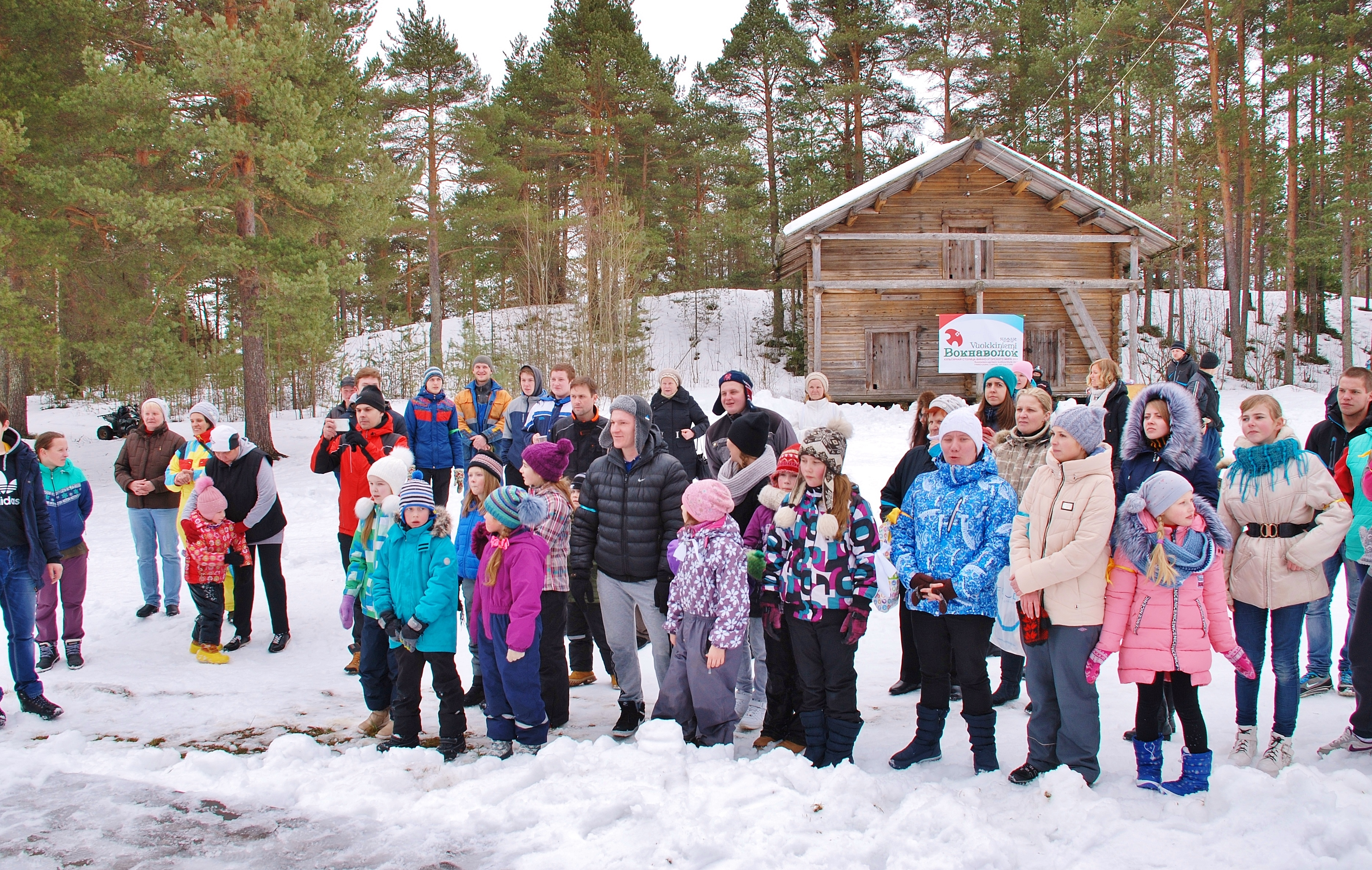
Voknavolok (Vuokkiniemi) village

	Average population (×1,000)	Live births	Deaths	Natural change	Crude birth rate (per 1,000)	Crude death rate (per 1,000)	Natural change (per 1,000)	Fertility rates
1870	200							
1903	395							
1906	364							
1910	400							
1913	444							
1970	714	11,346	5,333	6,013	15.9	7.5	8.4	
1975	723	12,748	6,086	6,662	17.6	8.4	9.2	
1980	741	12,275	7,374	4,901	16.6	10.0	6.6	
1985	770	13,201	8,205	4,996	17.1	10.7	6.5	
1990	792	10,553	8,072	2,481	13.3	10.2	3.1	1.87
1991	790	8,982	8,305	677	11.4	10.5	0.9	1.62
1992	788	7,969	9,834	−1,865	10.1	12.5	−2.4	1.46
1993	782	7,003	11,817	−4,814	9.0	15.1	−6.2	1.30
1994	774	6,800	13,325	−6,525	8.8	17.2	−8.4	1.26
1995	767	6,729	12,845	−6,116	8.8	16.7	−8.0	1.24
1996	760	6,461	11,192	−4,731	8.5	14.7	−6.2	1.19
1997	753	6,230	10,306	−4,076	8.3	13.7	−5.4	1.15
1998	747	6,382	10,285	−3,903	8.5	13.8	−5.2	1.18
1999	740	6,054	11,612	−5,558	8.2	15.7	−7.5	1.12
2000	732	6,374	12,083	−5,709	8.7	16.5	−7.8	1.18
2001	725	6,833	12,597	−5,764	9.4	17.4	−7.9	1.25
2002	717	7,247	13,435	−6,188	10.1	18.7	−8.6	1.33
2003	707	7,290	14,141	−6,851	10.3	20.0	−9.7	1.32
2004	696	7,320	13,092	−5,772	10.5	18.8	−8.3	1.31
2005	686	6,952	12,649	−5,697	10.1	18.4	−8.3	1.24
2006	676	6,938	11,716	−4,778	10.3	17.3	−7.1	1.22
2007	667	7,319	11,007	−3,688	11.0	16.5	−5.5	1.28
2008	659	7,682	11,134	−3,452	11.7	16.9	−5.2	1.35
2009	651	7,884	10,599	−2,715	12.1	16.3	−4.2	1.58
2010	644	7,821	10,471	−2,650	12.1	16.2	−4.1	1.58
2011	641	7,711	9,479	−1,768	12.0	14.7	−2.7	1.60
2012	640	8,027	9,804	−1,777	12.6	15.4	−2.8	1.71
2013	636	7,553	9,285	−1,732	11.9	14.6	−2.7	1.65
2014	634	7,816	9,245	−1,429	12.3	14.6	−2.3	1.74
2015	631	7,731	9,648	−1,917	12.2	15.3	−3.1	1.76(e)

=== Ethnic groups ===
According to the 2021 Census, ethnic Russians make up 86.4% of the republic's population, ethnic Karelians 5.5%. Other groups include Belarusians (2.0%), Ukrainians (1.2%), Finns (0.7%), Vepsians (0.5%), and a host of smaller groups, each accounting for less than 0.5% of the total population.

Ethnic group	1926 census		1939 census		1959 census		1970 census		1979 census		1989 census		2002 census		2010 census		2021 census^{1}	
Ethnic group	Number	%	Number	%	Number	%	Number	%	Number	%	Number	%	Number	%	Number	%	Number	%
Russians	153,967	57.2%	296,529	63.2%	412,773	62.7%	486,198	68.1%	522,230	71.3%	581,571	73.6%	548,941	76.6%	507,654	82.2%	407,469	86.4%
Karelians	100,781	37.4%	108,571	23.2%	85,473	13.0%	84,180	11.8%	81,274	11.1%	78,928	10.0%	65,651	9.2%	45,570	7.4%	25,901	5.5%
Belarusians	555	0.2%	4,263	0.9%	71,900	10.9%	66,410	9.3%	59,394	8.1%	55,530	7.0%	37,681	5.3%	23,345	3.8%	9,372	2.0%
Ukrainians	708	0.3%	21,112	4.5%	23,569	3.6%	27,440	3.8%	23,765	3.2%	28,242	3.6%	19,248	2.7%	12,677	2.0%	5,579	1.2%
Finns	2,544	0.9%	8,322	1.8%	27,829	4.2%	22,174	3.1%	20,099	2.7%	18,420	2.3%	14,156	2.0%	8,577	1.4%	3,397	0.7%
Vepsians	8,587	3.2%	9,392	2.0%	7,179	1.1%	6,323	0.9%	5,864	0.8%	5,954	0.8%	4,870	0.7%	3,423	0.5%	2,471	0.5%
Others	2,194	0.8%	20,709	4.4%	29,869	4.5%	20,726	2.9%	19,565	2.7%	21,505	2.7%	25,734	3.6%	16,422	2.7%	17,434	3.7%
^{1} 61,498 people were registered from administrative databases, and could not declare an ethnicity. It is estimated that the proportion of ethnicities in this group is the same as that of the declared group.

=== Languages ===
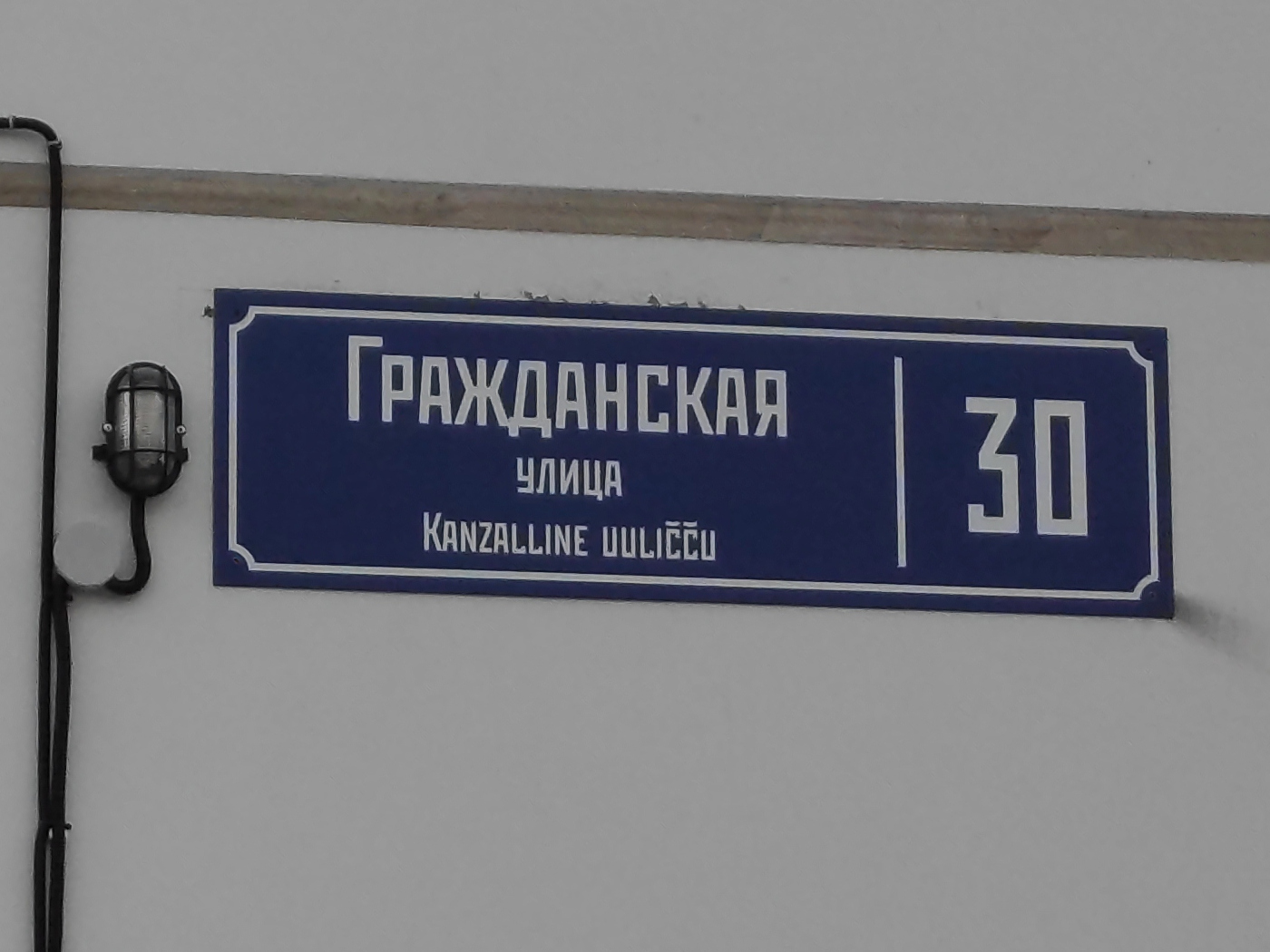
A bilingual street sign in Petrozavodsk

Currently Russian is the only official language of the republic. Karelian, Veps, and Finnish have been officially recognized languages of the republic since 2004, and they are de jure supported by the government. In early 2000s Karelian and Veps language nests were created in Petrozavodsk, Kalevala, Tuksa and Sheltozero, but were later shut down. Now native languages of Karelia have little support from the government.

Finnish was the second official language of Karelia from the creation of the Karelian Labour Commune up until the dissolution of the Soviet Union. Thereafter there were suggestions to raise Karelian as the second official language, but they were repeatedly turned down.

=== Religion ===
Religion in Republic of Karelia as of 2012 (Sreda Arena Atlas)
Russian Orthodoxy	27%
Protestantism	0.6%
Other Christians	2.2%
Spiritual but not religious	44%
Atheism and irreligion	17.6%
Other and undeclared	8.6%

The Karelians have traditionally been Eastern Orthodox. Lutheranism was brought to Karelia during Sweden's conquest of Karelia and was common in regions that then belonged to Finland. Nowadays Lutherans can be found in most big settlements but they remain a minority.

Catholics have one parish in Petrozavodsk.

The Petrozavodsk Jewish Religious Community was registered in 1997.

Karelian Muslims were organized into Karelian muftiate in 2001.

According to a 2012 survey, 27% of the population of Karelia adheres to the Russian Orthodox Church, 2% are unaffiliated Christians, and 1% are members of Protestant churches. In addition, 44% of the population declared to be "spiritual but not religious", 18% is atheist, and 8% follow other religions or did not answer the question.

== Economy ==
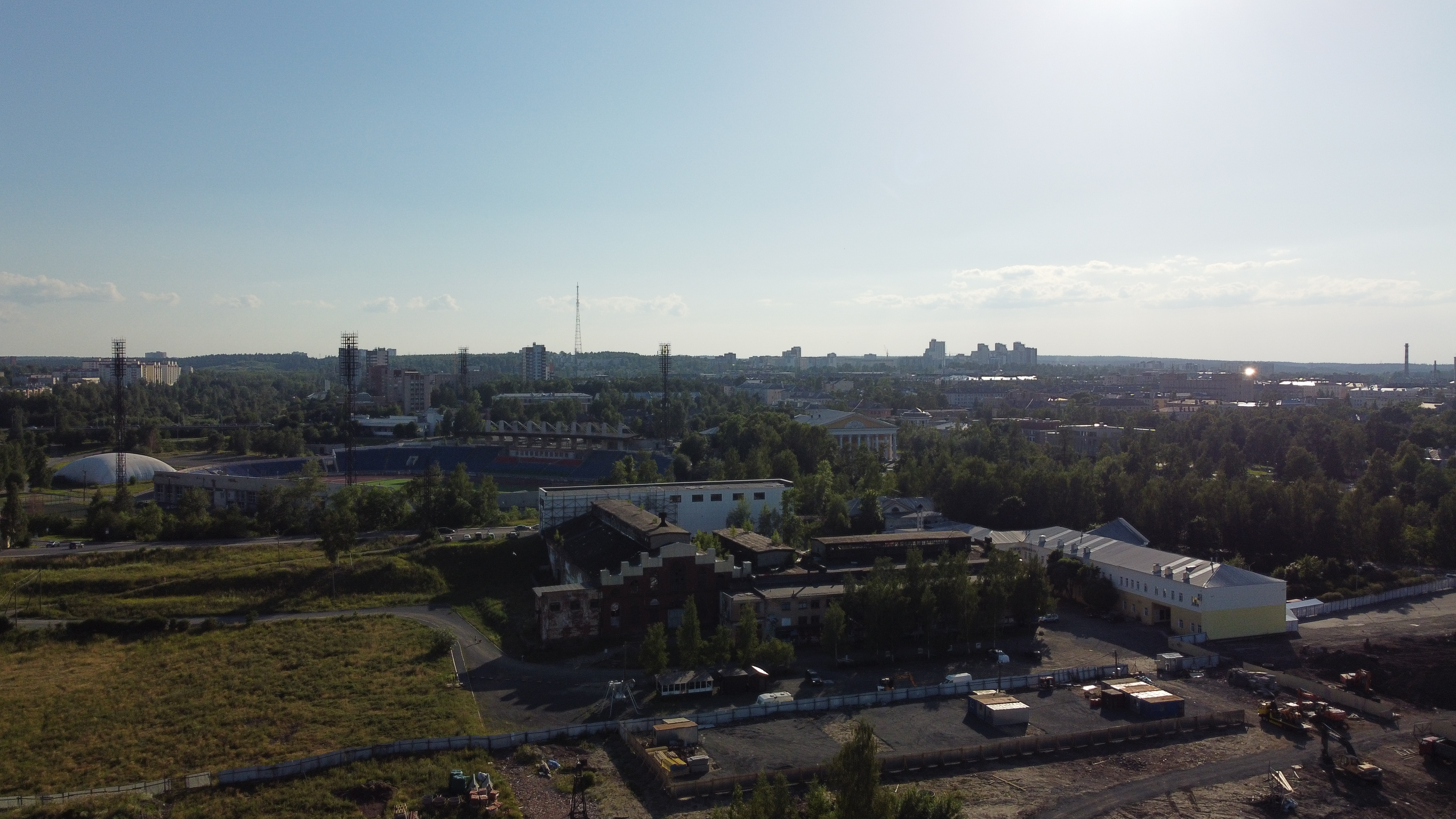
The remains of the Onega Tractor Plant

Karelia's economy is based on forestry, mining, tourism, agriculture, fishing and the paper industry.

Despite being 0,4% of Russia's population, 65–70% of all Russian trout is grown in the Republic, 26% of iron ore pellets, 20% of paper, 12% of wood pulp and cellulose.

Karelia's gross regional product (GRP) in 2007 was 109.5 billion rubles. The Karelian economy's GRP in 2010 was estimated at 127733.8 million rubles. Karelia's GRP in 2021 was 176 billion rubles. This amounts to 291,841 rubles per capita, which is lower than national average.

The largest companies in the region include Karelsky Okatysh ($1319755601 of revenue in 2021), Segezha Pulp and Paper Mill ($86897488 of revenue in 2021), OAO Kondopoga ($20366599 of revenue in 2021).

In the structure of the gross regional product in 2017, the main types of economic activity were:mining – 17.6%; manufacturing industries – 16.9%; transportation and storage – 11.8%; wholesale and retail trade; repair of motor vehicles and motorcycles – 9.8%; public administration and military security; social security – 8.7%.

A fast fiber-optic cable link connecting Finnish Kuhmo and Karelian Kostomuksha was built in 2007, providing fast telecommunications.

=== Budget sector ===
In 2022, the republic's budget received 75 billion 198 million rubles of revenue. At the same time, expenses amounted to 82 billion 202 million rubles.

Tax revenues make up the majority of budget revenues and in 2008 amounted to 64% of operating income. The tax concentration is relatively high: the 10 largest taxpayers, mainly industrial enterprises, provided about 38% of all tax revenues in 2008.

=== Industry ===
==== Forestry ====
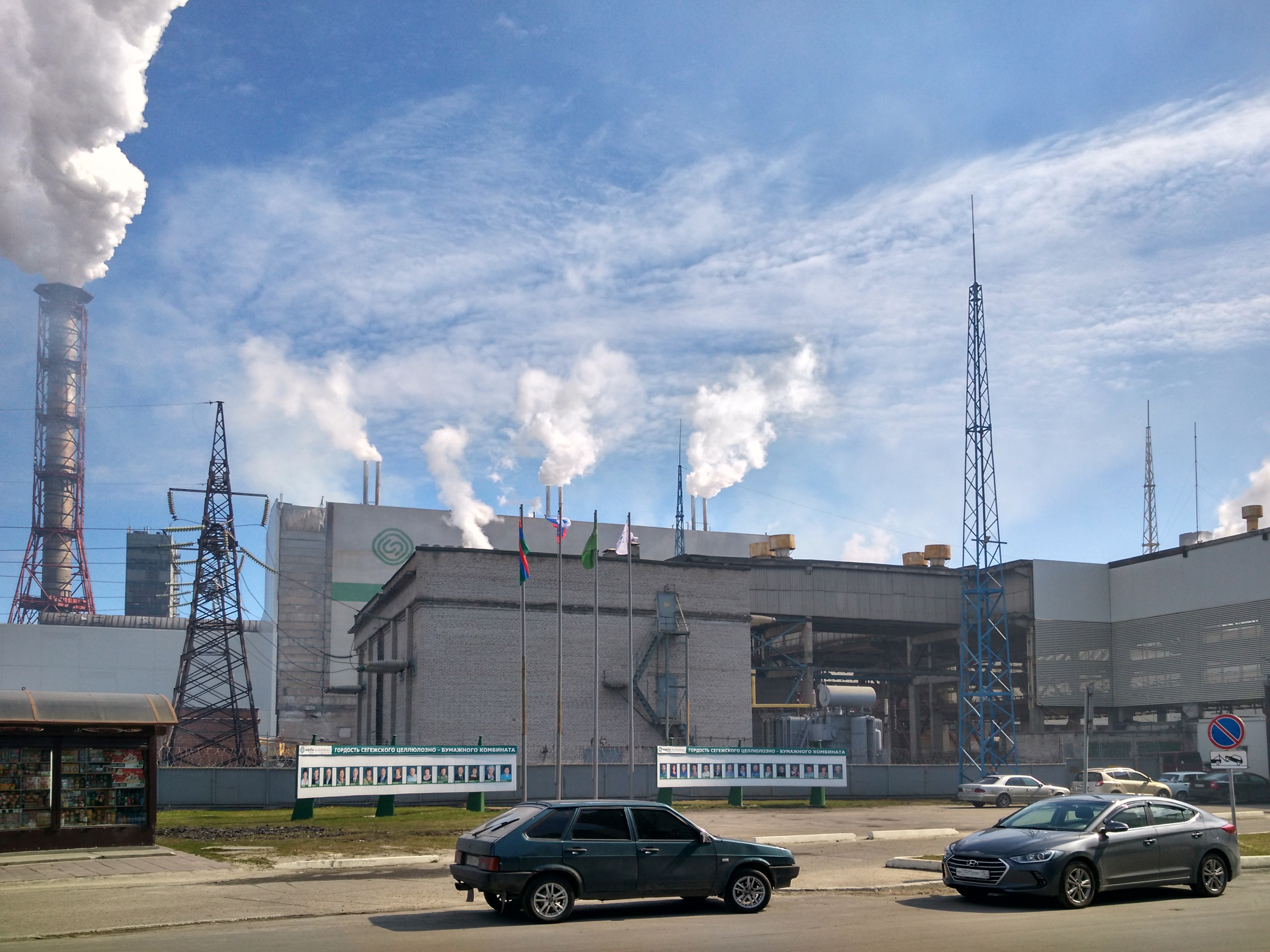
The Segezha Pulp and Paper Mill

The forest and wood processing sector dominates industrial activity in Karelia. A large number of small enterprises carry out timber logging whereas pulp and paper production is concentrated in five large enterprises, which produce about a quarter of Russia's total output of paper. Three largest companies in the pulp and paper sector in 2021 were: OAO Kondopoga (sales of $369314325), Segezha Pulp and Paper Mill ($221317040) and RK-Grand (Pitkäranta Pulp Factory) ($78750849).

The timber industry complex of Karelia produces 28% of the republic's industrial output.

==== Mining ====
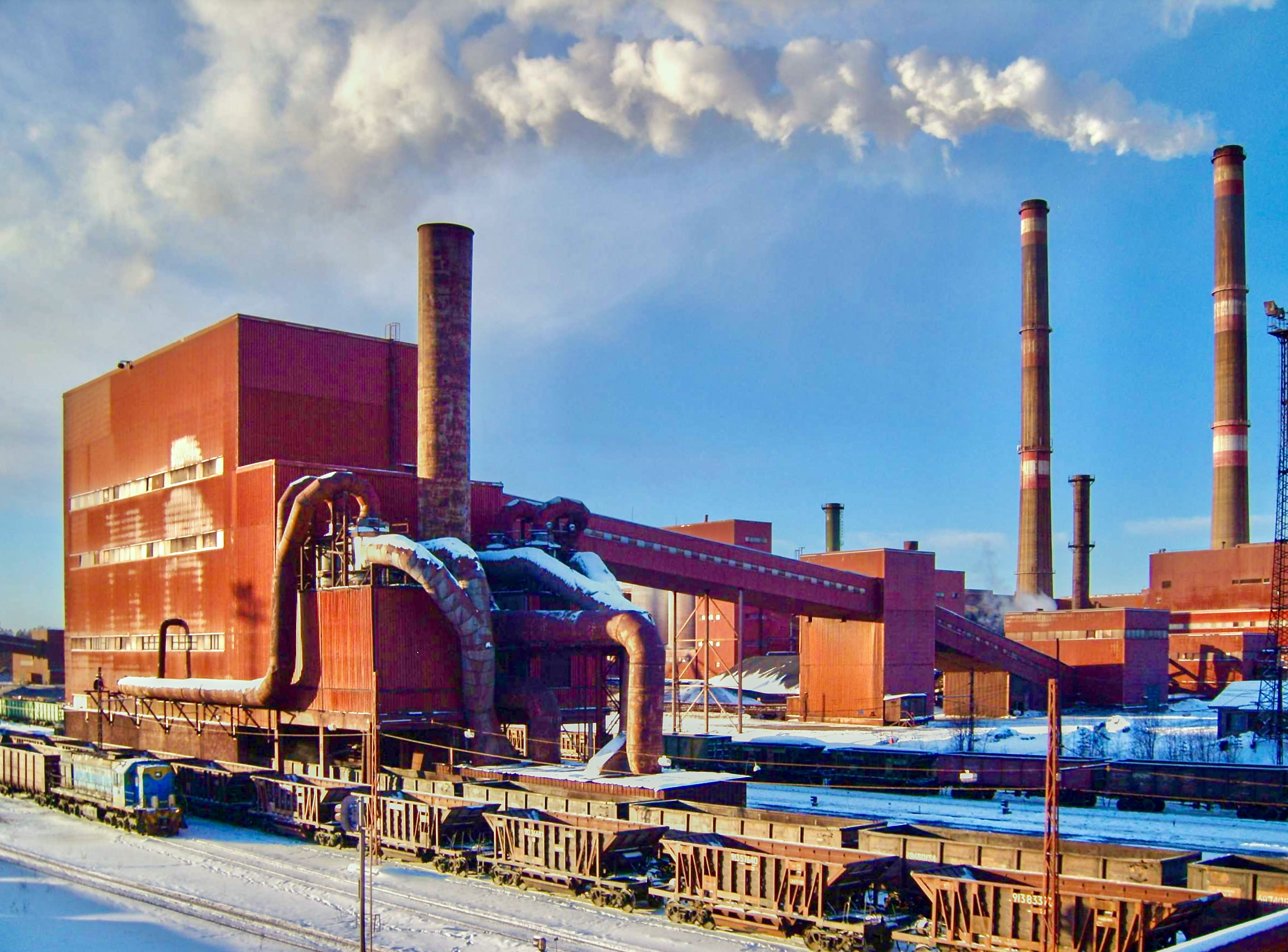
Karelsky okatysh

Karelia is a region with a lot of natural resources, including metals such as gold, silver, platinum, copper and palladium.

In 2007, extractive industries (including extraction of metal ores) amounted to 30% of the republic's industrial output. There are about 53 mining companies in Karelia, employing more than 10,000 people. One of the most important companies in the sector is AO Karelian Pellet, which is the 5th largest of Russia's 25 mining and ore dressing enterprises involved in ore extraction and iron ore concentrate production. Other large companies in the sector were OAO Karelnerud, Mosavtorod State Unitary Enterprise, and Pitkjaranta Mining Directorate State Unitary Enterprise.

==== Energy ====
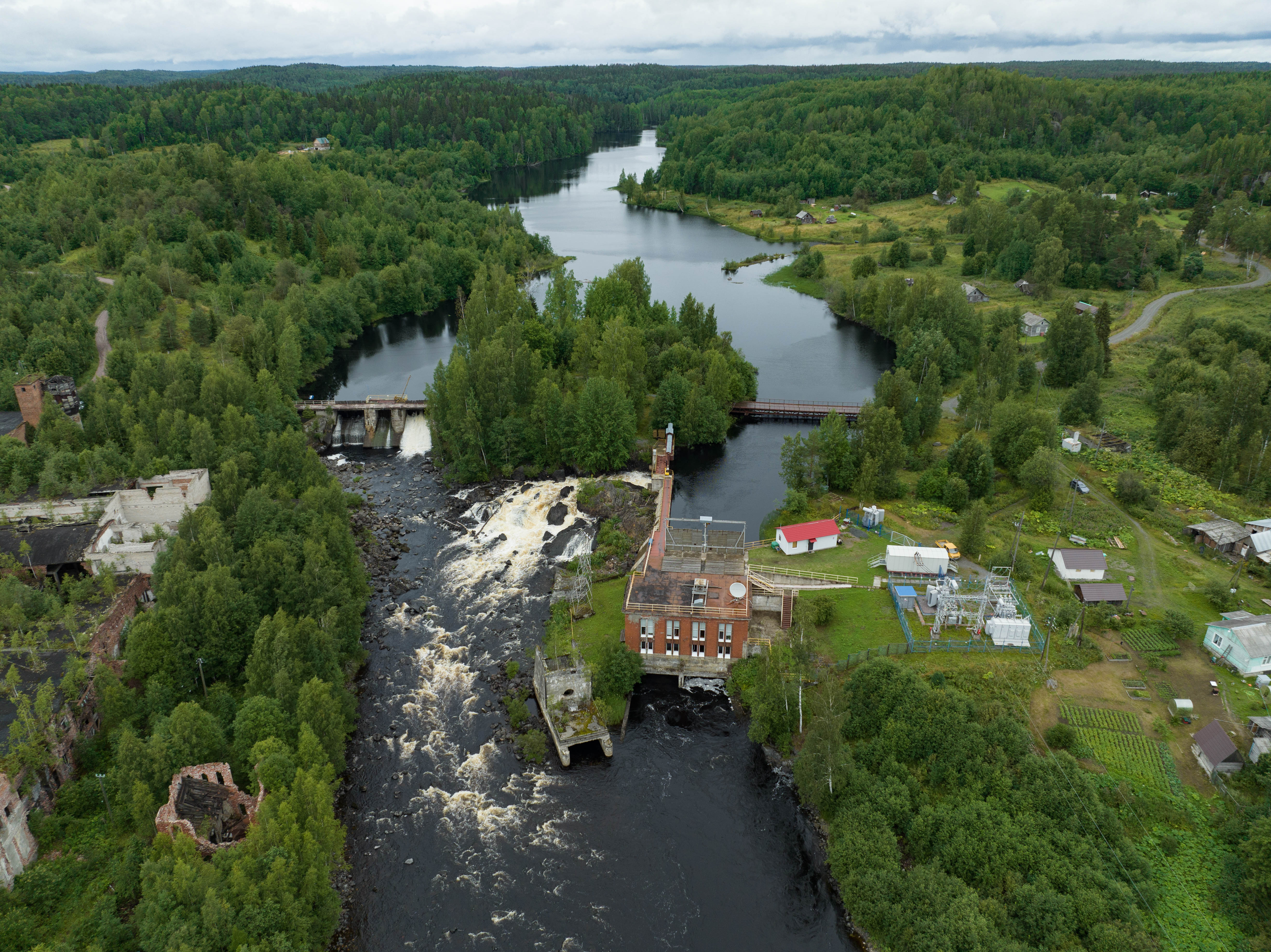
The Harlu hydroelectric plant

As of 2021, there were 29 powerplants, of them 21 were hydroplants and 8 thermal power plants.

==== Agriculture ====
Due to Karelia's climate, only 1,2% of the land is used for farming. Most of the farmland is located on podzol.

20 agricultural organizations employing 2.3 thousand people. Animal husbandry is the leading branch of agriculture in the Republic, the main areas of which are dairy cattle breeding, pig breeding, broiler poultry farming, and fur farming.

Annually agricultural enterprises of the region produce up to 59 thousand tons of milk. Based on its natural and climatic conditions, the plant growing industry is focused on the production of feed for livestock, the bulk of potatoes and vegetables are grown in small forms of management.

==== Fishing ====
Fishing enterprises of Karelia produced 91.9 thousand tons of aquatic biological resources in 2021.

In the Barents Sea and the Atlantic Ocean, 89.9 thousand tons of aquatic biological resources were caught, of them 34.6 thousand tons of cod and haddock, 34.1 thousand tons of blue whiting, 18 thousand tons of mackerel and 1.1 thousand tons of northern shrimp. 306 tons of fish were caught in the White Sea and 612 tons of kelp and fucus were harvested. The catch of freshwater fish amounted to 1.1 thousand tons.

=== Tourism ===
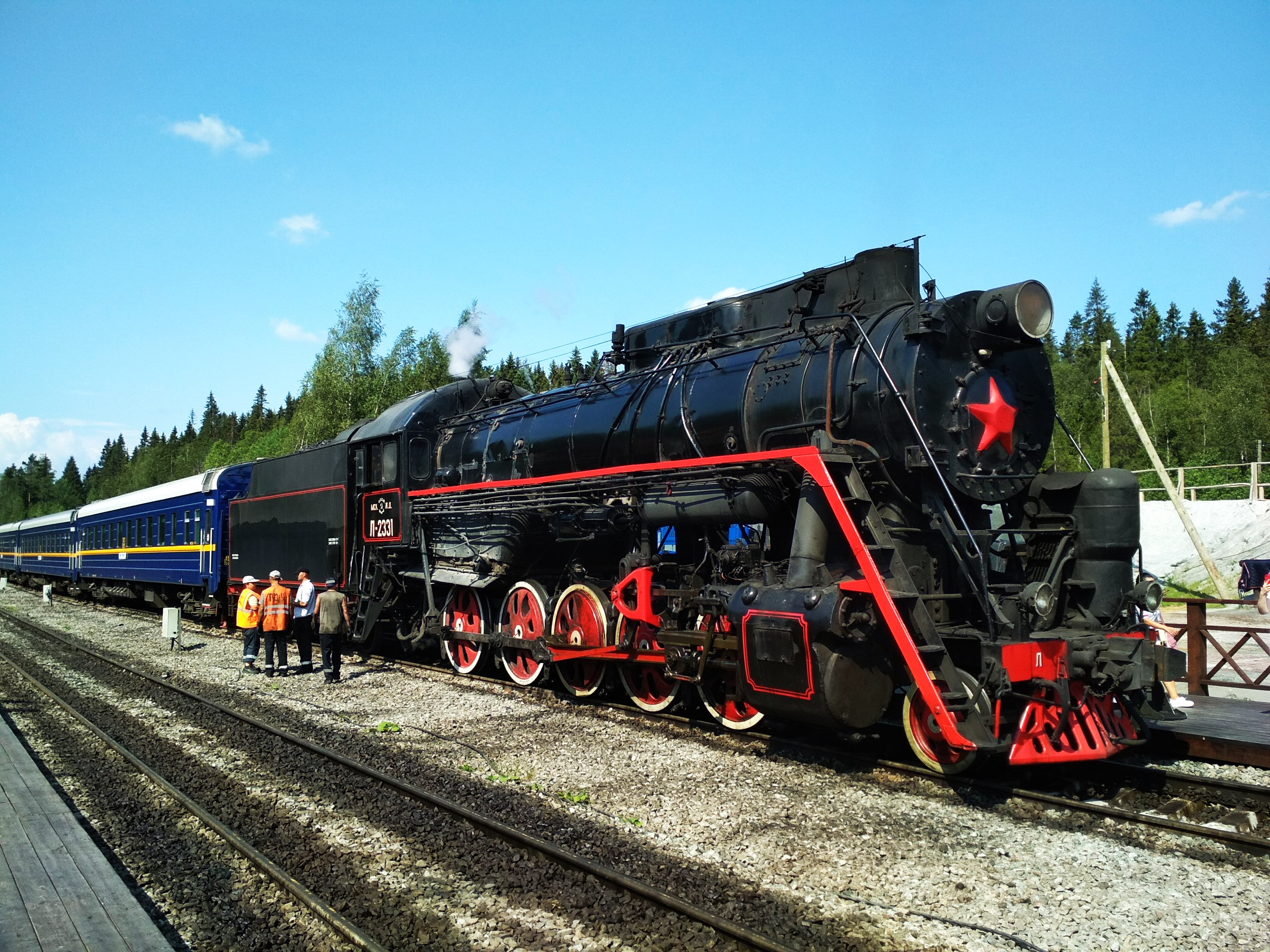
Ruskeala museum express

Karelia is popular for international and domestic tourism.

Traditional, active, cultural and ecological types of tourism are popular among tourists.

Karelia attracts ecotourists with its nature and wilderness and low population density. During the summer water tourism is also popular among many tourists.

Cultural tourism is also a big part of Karelia's tourism economy. The region attracts many tourists with its wooden architecture, local culture, and traditions.

Karelia also has the first Russian health resort – Martial Waters (1719).

=== Foreign trade ===
The economy of Karelia is export-orientated. By the volume of exports per capita, Karelia is among the leading regions of Russia. More than 50% of manufactured products (and up to 100% in several industries) are exported.

The Republic's main export partners in 2001 were Finland (32% of total exports), Germany (7%), Netherlands (7%), and the United Kingdom (6%). Main export products were lumber (over 50%), iron ore pellets (13–15%) paper and cardboard (6–9%) and sawn timber with (5–7%). Many of Karelia's companies have received investments from Finland.

== Transportation ==
=== Railroad ===
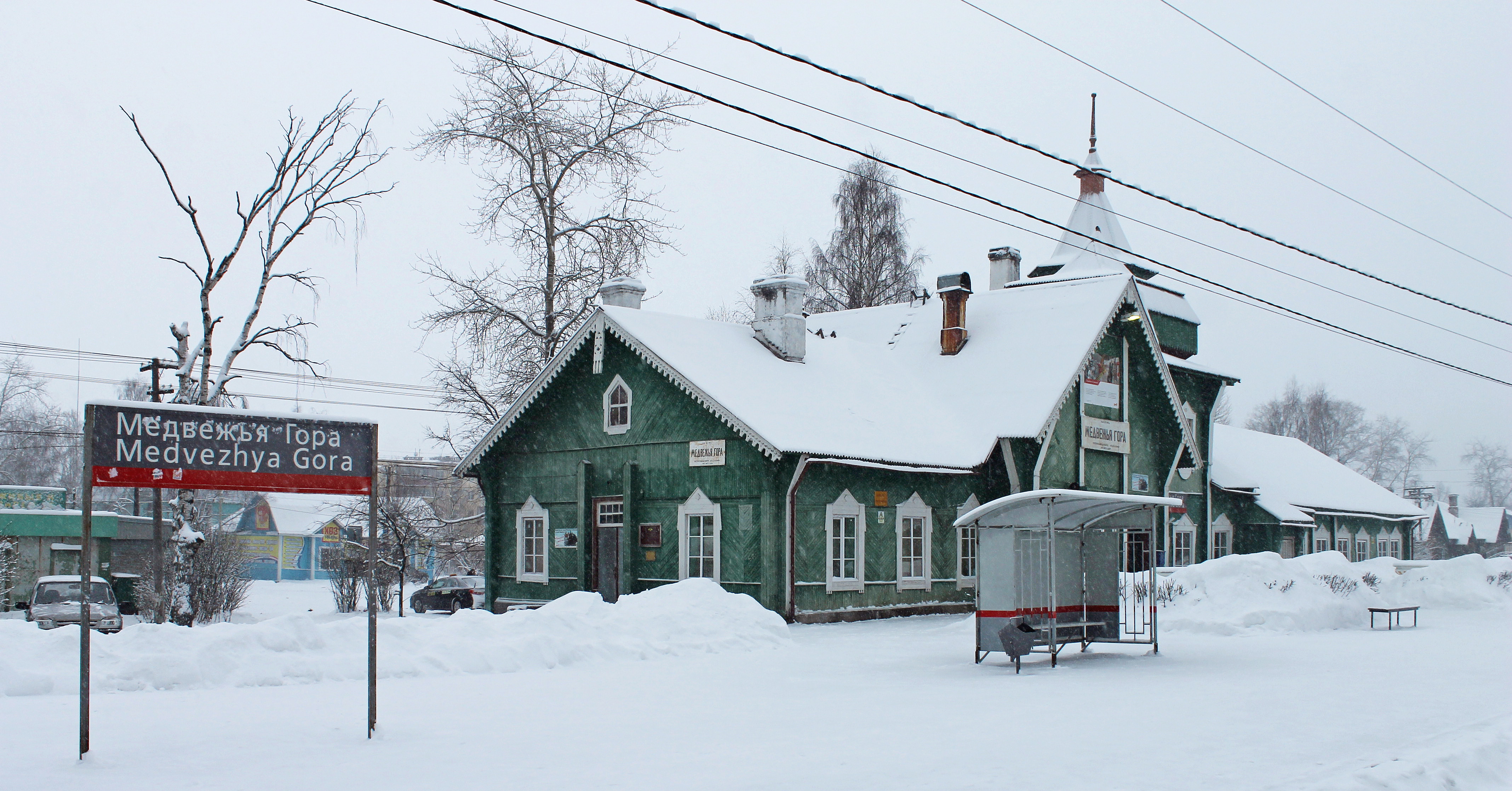
Train station in Medvezhyegorsk

Karelia is a strategically important railroad region due to the fact that it connects Murmansk with the rest of Russia by the Kirov Railway, which was electrified in 2005.

There are also rail connections with Finland in Värtsilä and Kostomuksha, but they are not electrified.

Most of Karelia's railway lines are served by the Petrozavodsk branch of the Oktyabrskaya Railway, which is one of the largest budget-forming enterprises of the Republic.

All Karelian district capitals are connected by railroad, except for the Kalevalsky district and Prionezhsky district.

In total, Karelia has 1915 km of railways.

=== Water communications ===
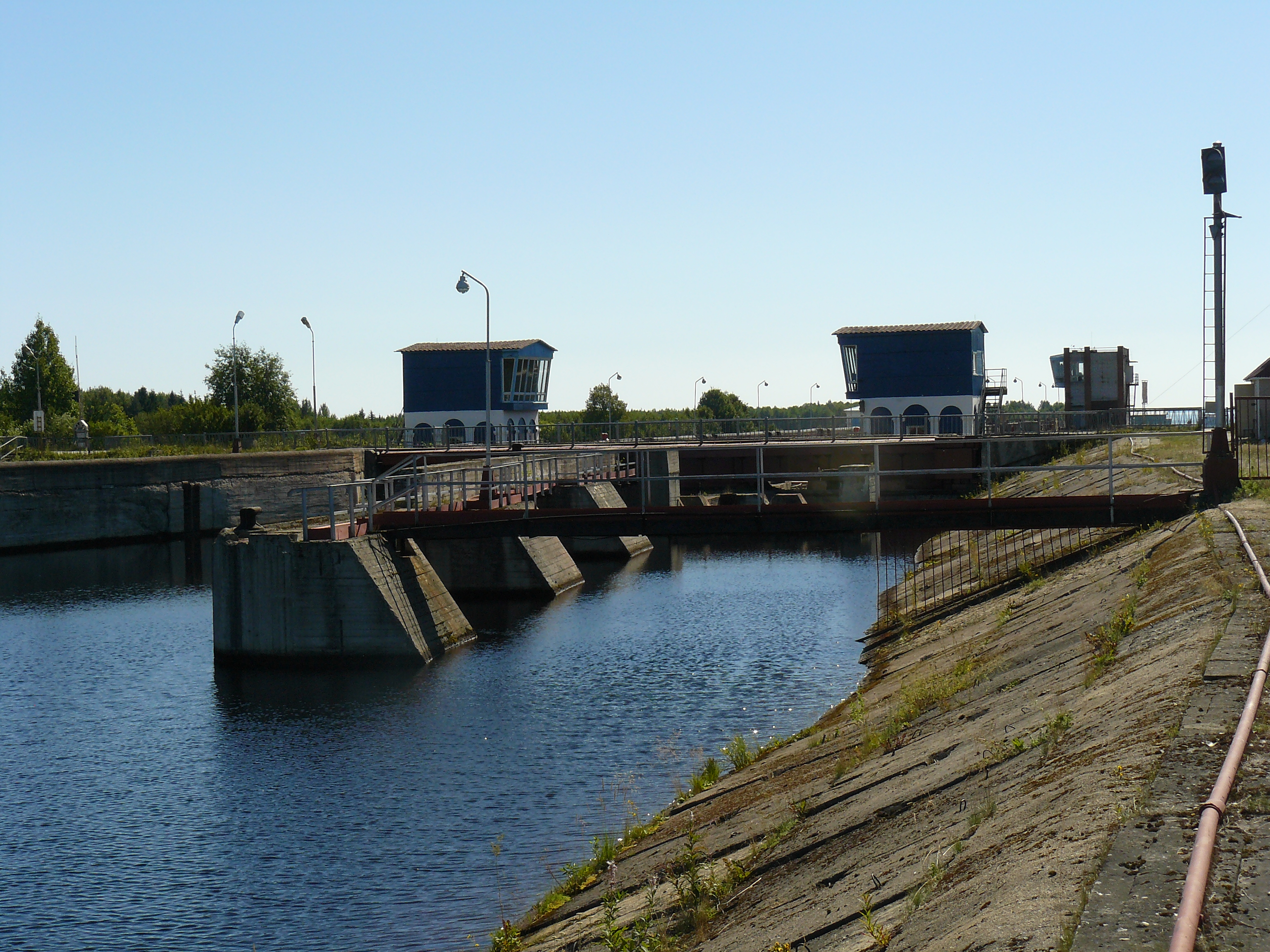
White Sea-Baltic Canal

Water communications connect Karelia with the Barents, Baltic, Black, White and Caspian Seas.

The White Sea–Baltic Canal was built in the 1930s to connect the Baltic and White seas. The 227 km long canal was built by prisoners. Even though it has 19 locks, the canal cannot pass vessels with a draft of more than 5 meters. The canal is a part of the Volgo-Baltic Waterway.

There are also river ports on the coast of the White Sea, there were plans to upgrade them to ocean ports but they were deemed too expensive.

=== Highways ===
R-21 Highway

Automobile highway R-21 "Kola" crosses Karelia and connects the Murmansk region and Murmansk seaport with St. Petersburg and Moscow.

European route E105 also goes through Karelia.

Other highways connect with Finland in Louhsky district Värtsilä and Kostomuksha.

Many of Karelian roads are still unimproved.

=== Air transportation ===
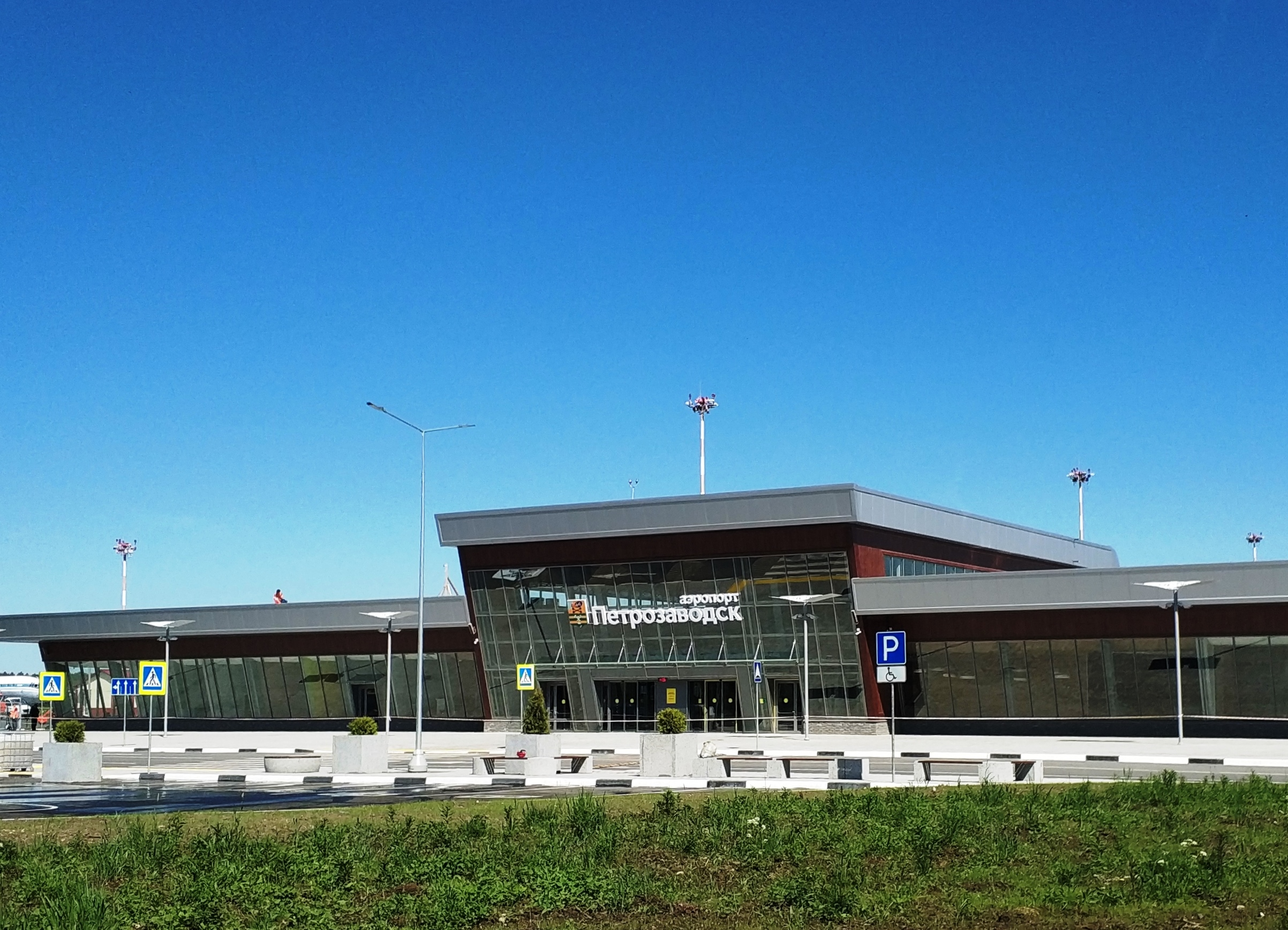
Petrozavodsk Airport

Petrozavodsk Airport is the only working airport in Karelia as of 2022.

There are other airports, such as Kalevala or Kostomuksha, but they are either not in use or are only used by firefighters.

== Healthcare ==
In 2024, the incidence of cancer in Karelia was 684 cases per 100,000 population, which is 36 more than in 2023 and is the highest rate among Russian regions.

According to Olga Ruotselainen, Deputy head of the Karelian Ministry of Health, today more than 20,000 people with a diagnosis of oncology are registered.

Women in Karelia most often suffer from breast cancer. Cancer of other skin growths is in second place, and colon cancer is in third place. Among men, the most common type of oncology is prostate cancer, second being cancer of the bronchi, trachea, lung, and third being skin cancer.

The healthcare system of the Republic of Karelia has 24 hospital institutions (republican and district hospitals), 5 dispensaries, the Republican Center for the Prevention and Control of AIDS and Infectious Diseases, the Republican Blood Transfusion Station, 3 maternity and childhood care institutions, 10 outpatient clinics, 5 special type healthcare institutions, 7 social service institutions, 18 district social protection institutions, the autonomous educational institution of secondary vocational education of the Republic of Karelia Petrozavodsk Basic Medical College.

The regional target program Improvement of the Demographic Situation of the Republic of Karelia for the period 2008–2010 and up to 2015 has been adopted.

== Culture ==
Karelia is very culturally diverse region that was influenced by Finno-Ugric, Slavic and Scandinavian cultures. The main unifying factor in the formation of the culture of the region was the Orthodox religion.

A lot is being done in the Republic of Karelia today to support the interests of more than 100 nationalities inhabiting it, including Karelians, Veps and Finns. More than 60 national public associations have been registered: unions, congresses, popular movements, autonomies, friendship societies, cultural societies. There is a regional target program Karelia – the Territory of Consent, a republican target program State support of Karelian, Vepsian and Finnish languages, a public council has been established to coordinate the implementation of these programs.

=== Literature ===
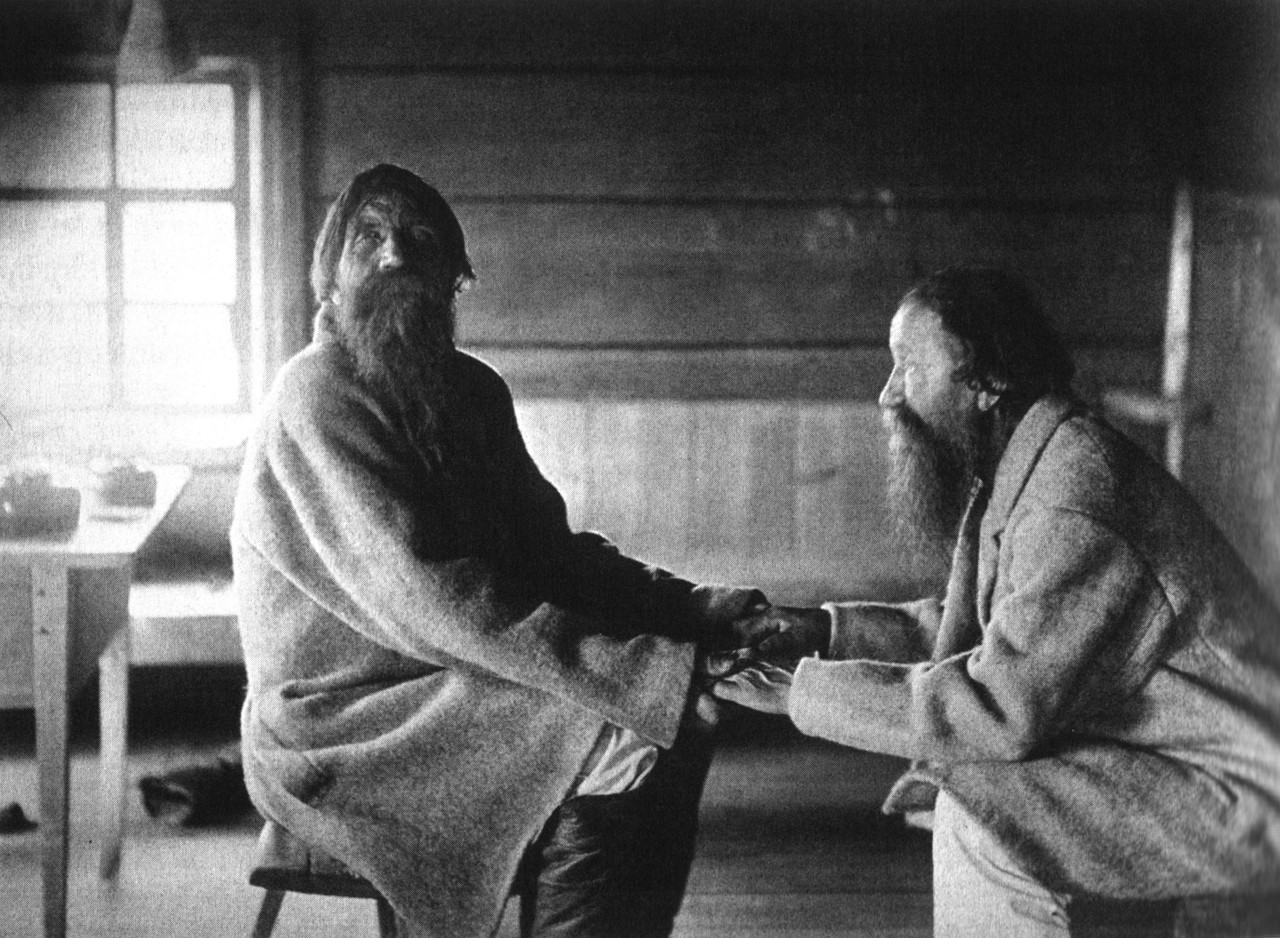
Kalevala rune singers

Karelia is sometimes called "the songlands", as Karelian poems constitute most of the Karelo-Finnish epic Kalevala and many of Russian Bylinas were documented in Pudozh.

The written literature of Karelia was formed at the beginning of the 20th century. In the 1930s Karelian and Veps languages gained a writing system, but during the Stalinist repressions many books in Veps and Karelian were burned and cultural figures were deported.

After the creation of the Karelian Labour Commune many American and Canadian finns moved to Karelia and began creating new literature. Many Karelians could understand Finnish so some authors, such as one of the most famous Karelian writers Antti Timonen , started to write in Finnish.

Writers of the Republic of Karelia are united in public organizations:

- Karelian regional branch of the Union of Writers of Russia
- Karelian Writers' Union
- Representation of the Union of Russian Writers in Karelia
- Union of Young Writers Northern Lights

=== Art ===
Karelian art history begun with Petroglyphs, which were created around 6,500 years ago. They became a UNESCO World Heritage Site, listed in 2021.

Icon painters were the first professional artists of Karelia.

Karelia has become a source of inspiration for many famous artists of the 19th–20th century such as: Ivan Shishkin, Arkhip Kuindzhi, and N. K. Roerich.

The formation of professional painting in Karelia is associated with the name of the People's Artist of the KFSSR V. N. Popov (1869–1945). In 1934, the Union of Artists of the Autonomous Karelian SSR was established, the first chairman of which was elected Yu. O. Rautanen, since 2010, the Karelian branch of the Union of Artists of Russia. As part of the Karelian department, there is an Association of Young artists and Art Historians.

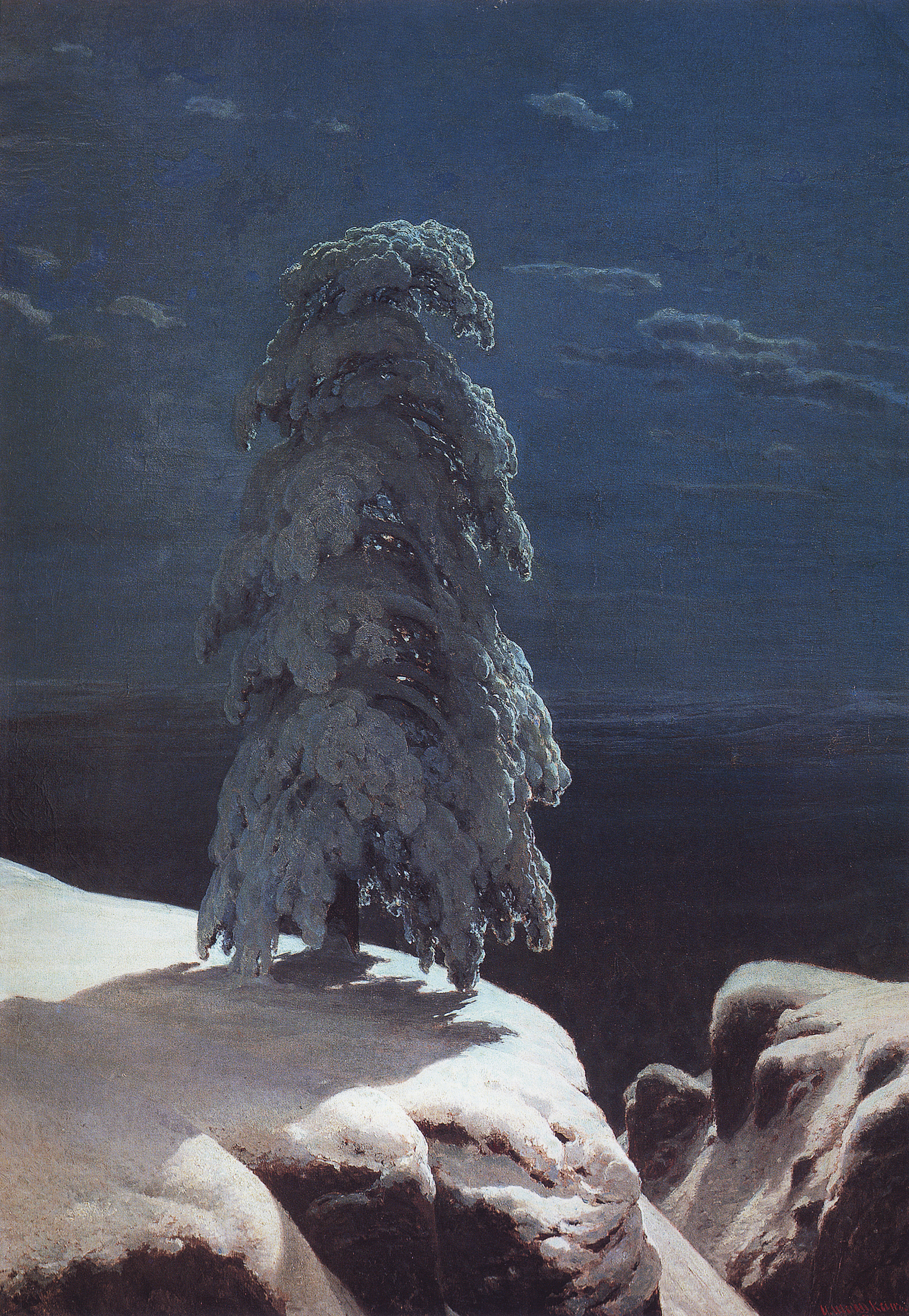
Ivan Shishkin, In the Wild North... (1891)

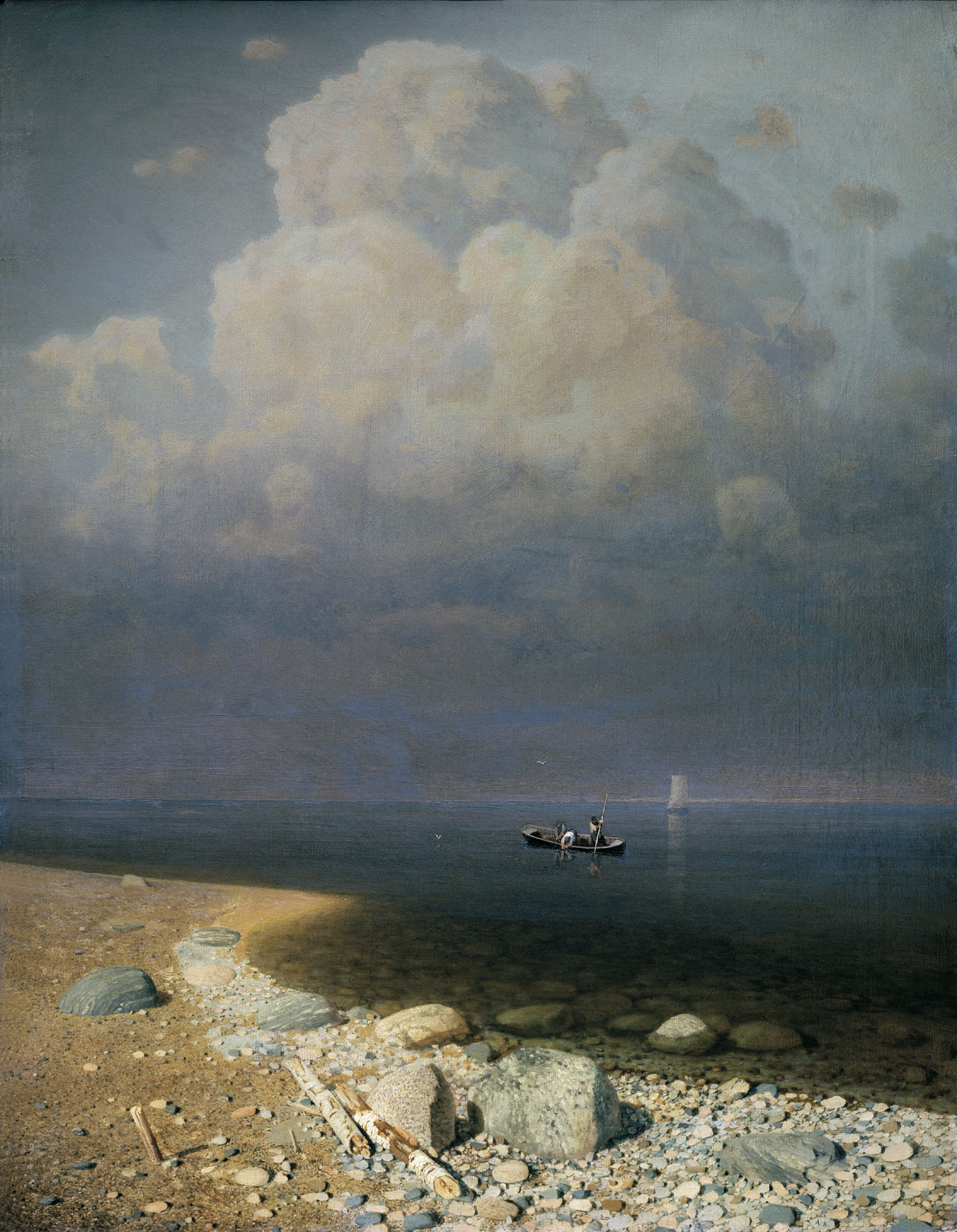
Arkhip Kuindzhi, Ladoga (1873)

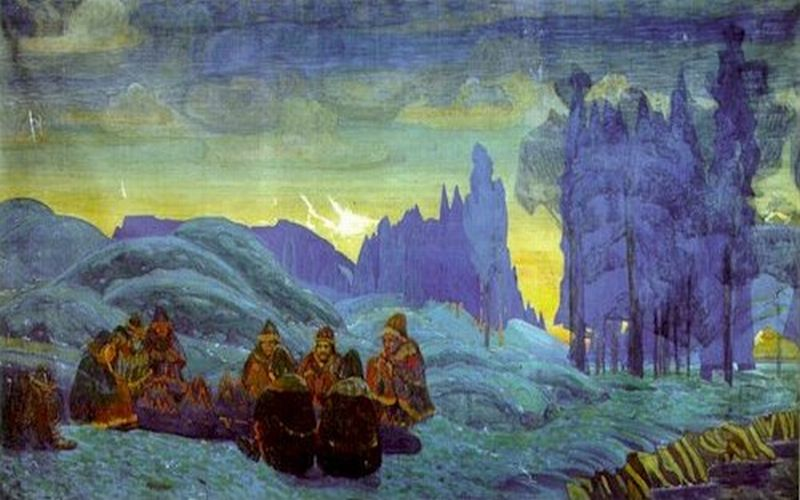
N. K. Roerich, Pomors, Evening (1907)

=== Architecture ===
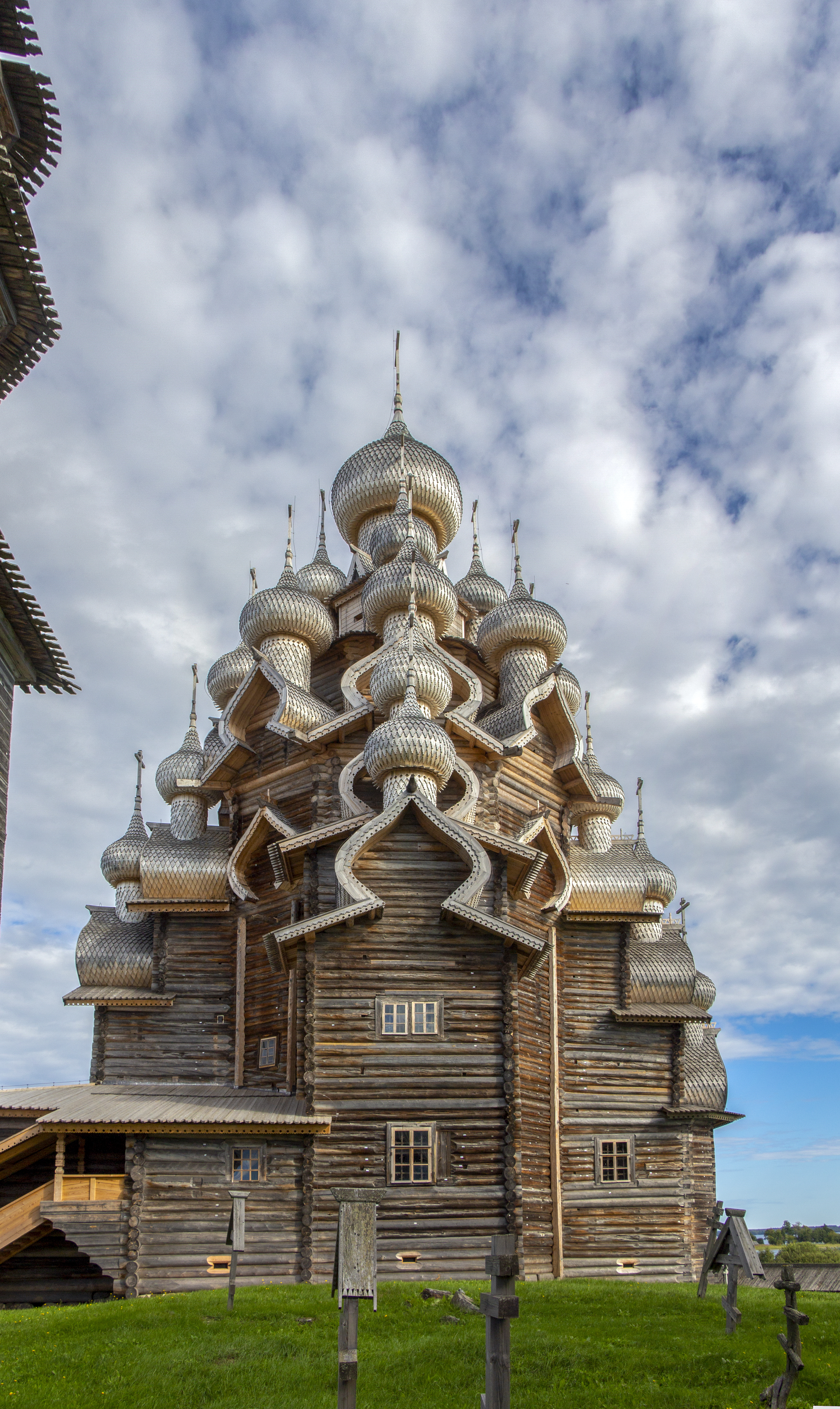
Church of the Transfiguration, Kizhi

Karelia is famous for its wooden architecture. Karelian architecture developed under the strong influence of Novgorod architecture. Examples of Karelian architecture are collected in the Kizhi Pogost Museum.

Later Karelian architecture was influenced by Finns, especially after the creation of the Karelian Labour Commune.

=== Music ===
Kantele is the most famous traditional Karelian musical instrument. In Kalevala the mage Väinämöinen makes the first kantele from the jawbone of a giant pike and a few hairs from Hiisi's stallion.

In 1933, the Karelian State Philharmonic Symphony Orchestra was founded. The orchestra belonged to the Karelian Radio and Television, part of the Ministry of Culture of Karelia. However, since 1997, the orchestra has been a part of the Karelian State Philharmonic Society.

In 1935, the Karelian Folk Segozer Choir (Padans), the Karelian Folk Olonets Choir Karelian birch was founded.

In 1936, the National Song and Dance Ensemble of Karelia (Kantele), the Veps Folk Choir, and the Karelian Folk Petrovsky Choir were founded.

The Pomeranian Folk Choir (Medvezhyegorsk) was founded in 1937, and the Karelian Folk Vedlozersky Choir (Vedlozero) was founded in 1938.

In 1937, the Union of Karelian Composers was founded.

In 1938, the Petrozavodsk Music College (now the Petrozavodsk Music College named after K. E. Rautio) was opened.

In 1939, the Symphony Orchestra of the Karelo-Finnish State Philharmonic was founded.

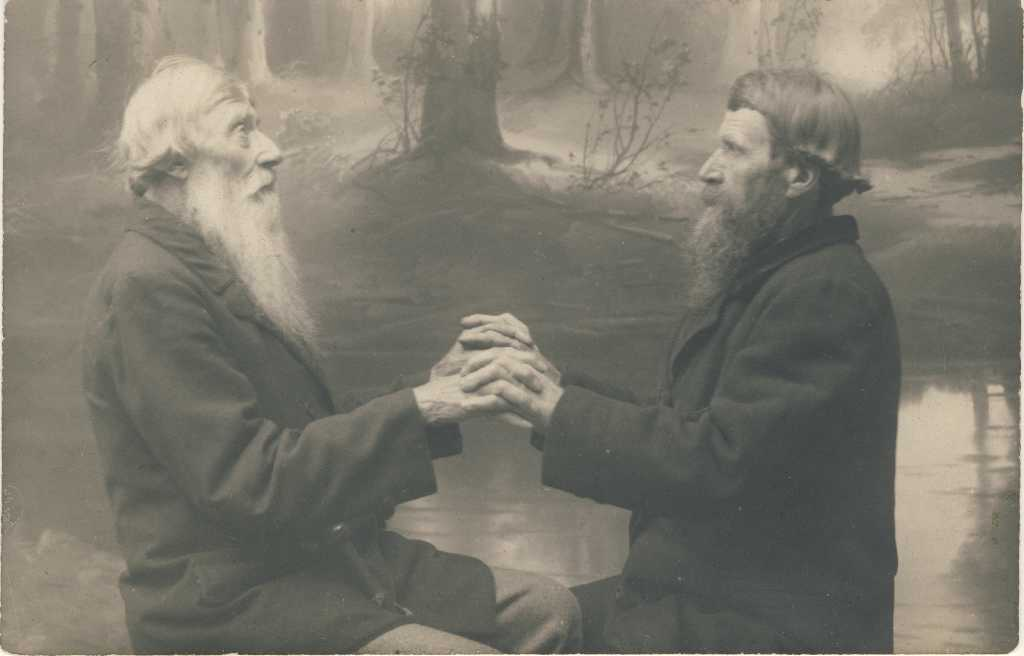
Karelian Rune singers

In 1967, the Petrozavodsk branch of the Leningrad State Conservatory (now the Petrozavodsk Glazunov State Conservatory) was opened.

In 1973, Honored Artist of the Republic of Karelia L. P. Budanov founded the Karelia-Brass ensemble.

Throughout the years, many Karelian, Russian, Veps, Finnish and Pomor choirs were created, such as the Karelian choir "Oma pajo" in 1990, which is still active.

There are more than twenty children's music schools in the republic, including:

- Petrozavodsk Children's Music School No. 1 named after Sinisalo (opened in 1918). The school is the organizer of the international competition «Onega Wave», the international festival of the Barents region Northern Lights, the festival of music of the Nordic countries «Sankta Lucia».
- Olonets Children's Music School (opened in 1952)
- Belomorsk Children's Music School (opened in 1955)
- Kondopoga Children's Music School (opened in 1957)
- Petrozavodsk Children's Music and Choral School (opened in 1966)
- G. A. Vavilov Kostomukshi Children's Music School (opened in 1977)
- Petrozavodsk Children's Music School named after G. V. Sviridov (opened in 1983)
- Children's Art School of Petrozavodsk named after M. A. Balakirev (opened in 1991)

Musical groups: Sattuma family ensemble, Leo Sevets, Santtu Karhu & Talvisovat, Myllärit, Drolls Early Music Ensemble, WaTaGa.

=== Museums ===
==== Federal ====
- State Historical, Architectural and Ethnographic Museum-Reserve "Kizhi"

==== Republican ====
- National Museum of the Republic of Karelia
- Museum of the Karelian Front in Belomorsk
- Lonin Museum of Veps Ethnography (branch)
- Marcial Waters Museum (branch of the National Museum of the Republic of Karelia)
- Valaam Research, Church-Archaeological and Natural Museum-Reserve
- Museum of Fine Arts of the Republic of Karelia
- Museum of the History of Public Education of the Republic of Karelia
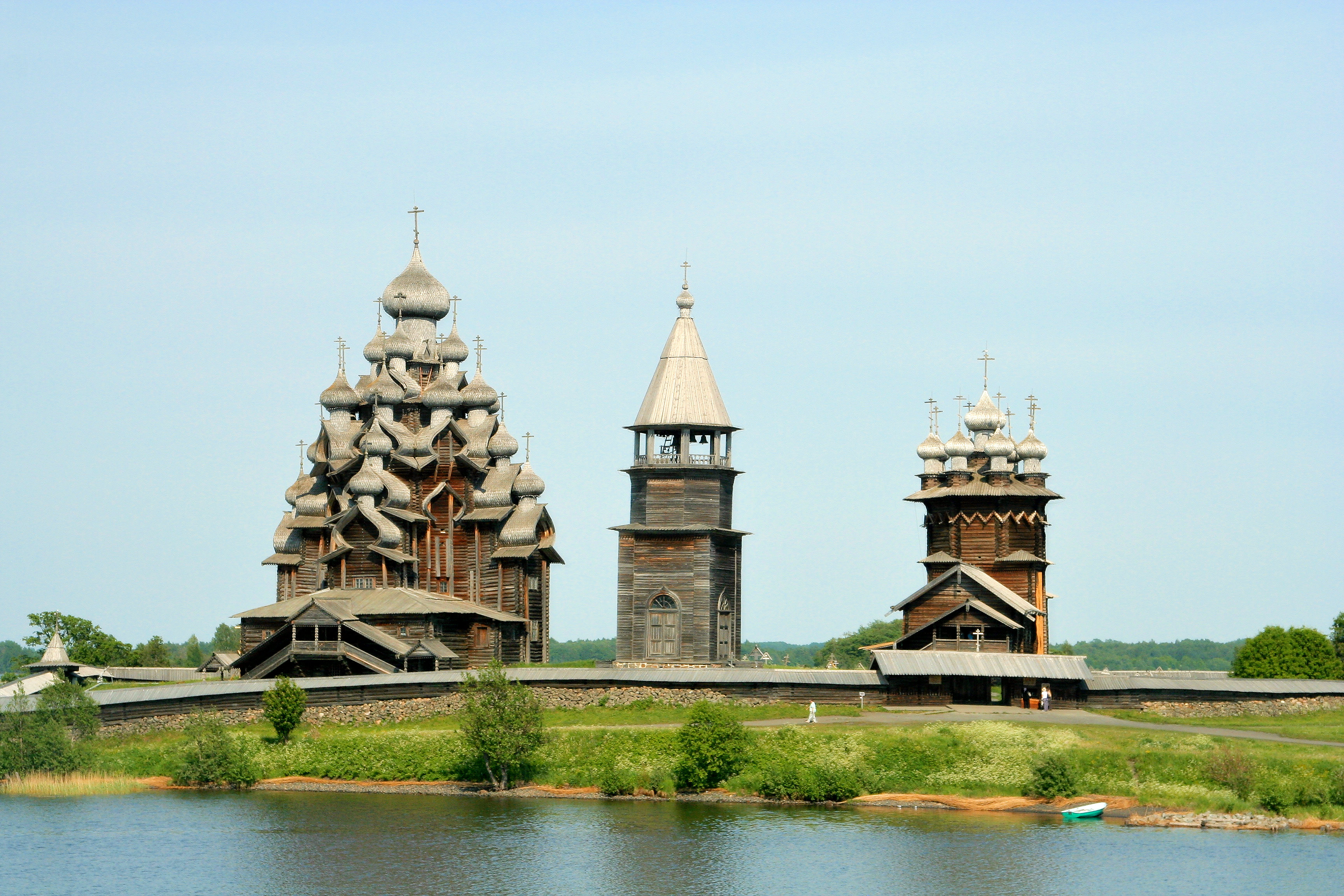
Kizhi State Historical, Architectural and Ethnographic Museum-Reserve

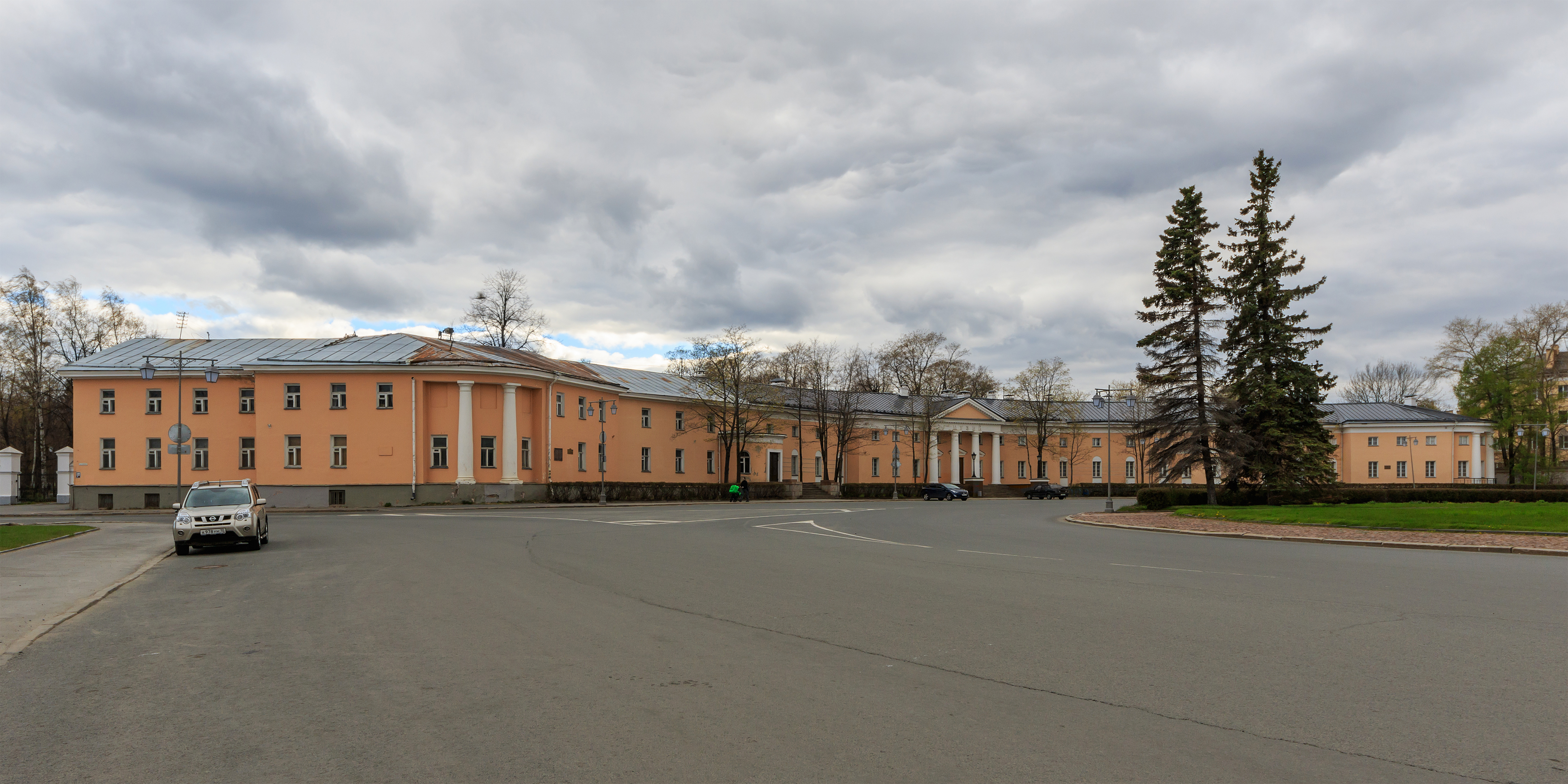
National Museum of the Republic of Karelia

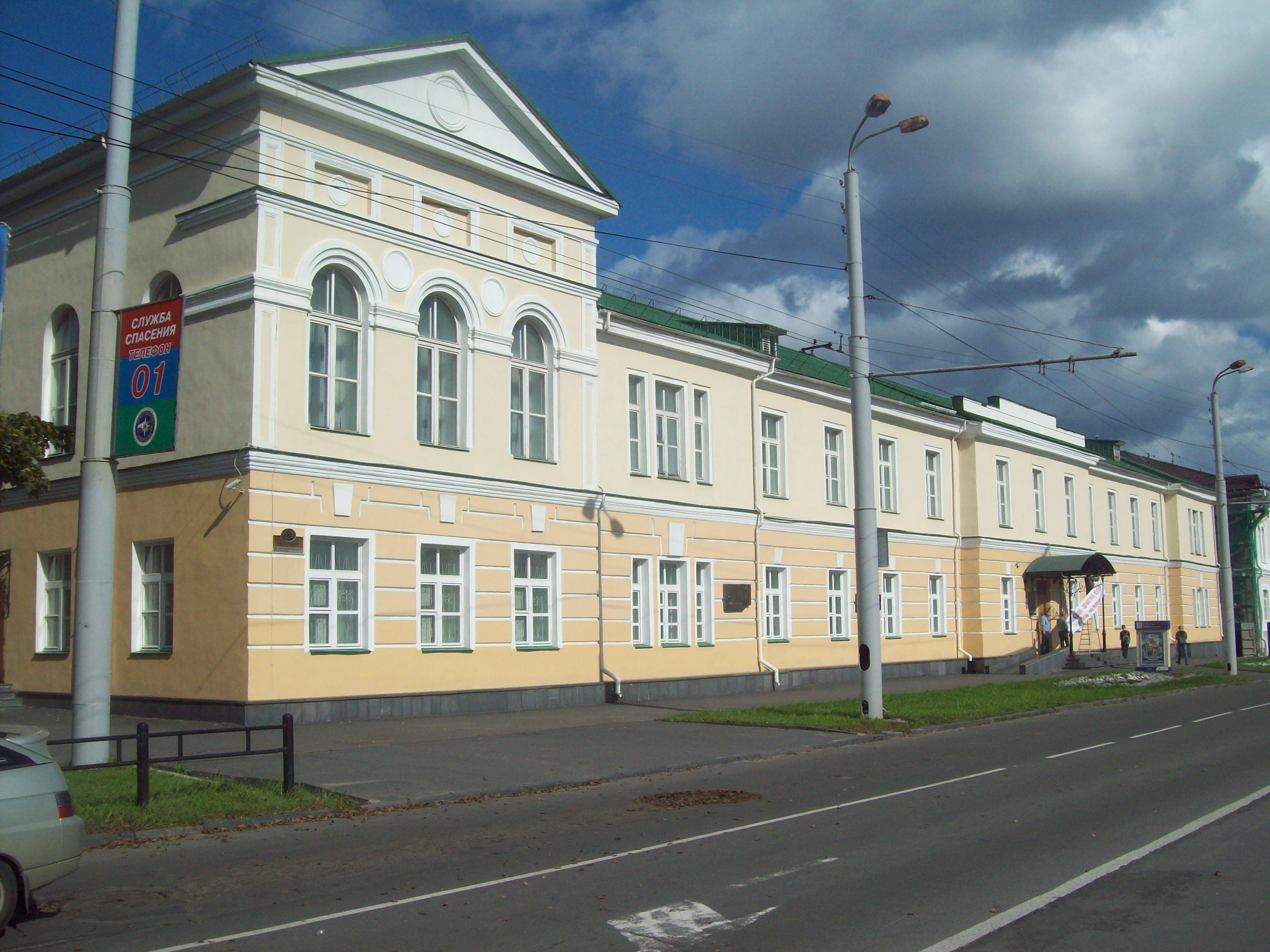
Museum of Fine Arts of the Republic of Karelia

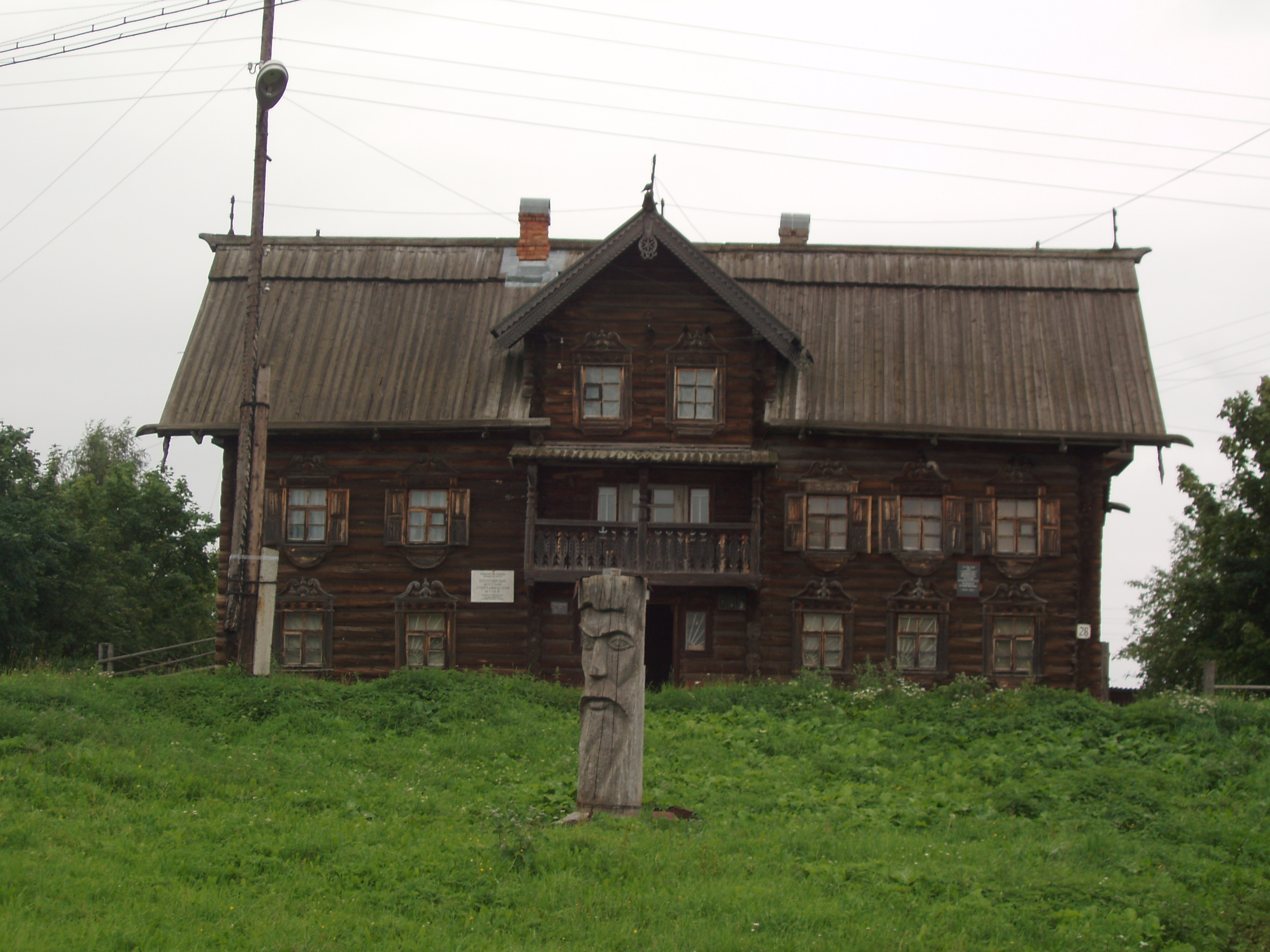
Lonin Museum of Veps Ethnography

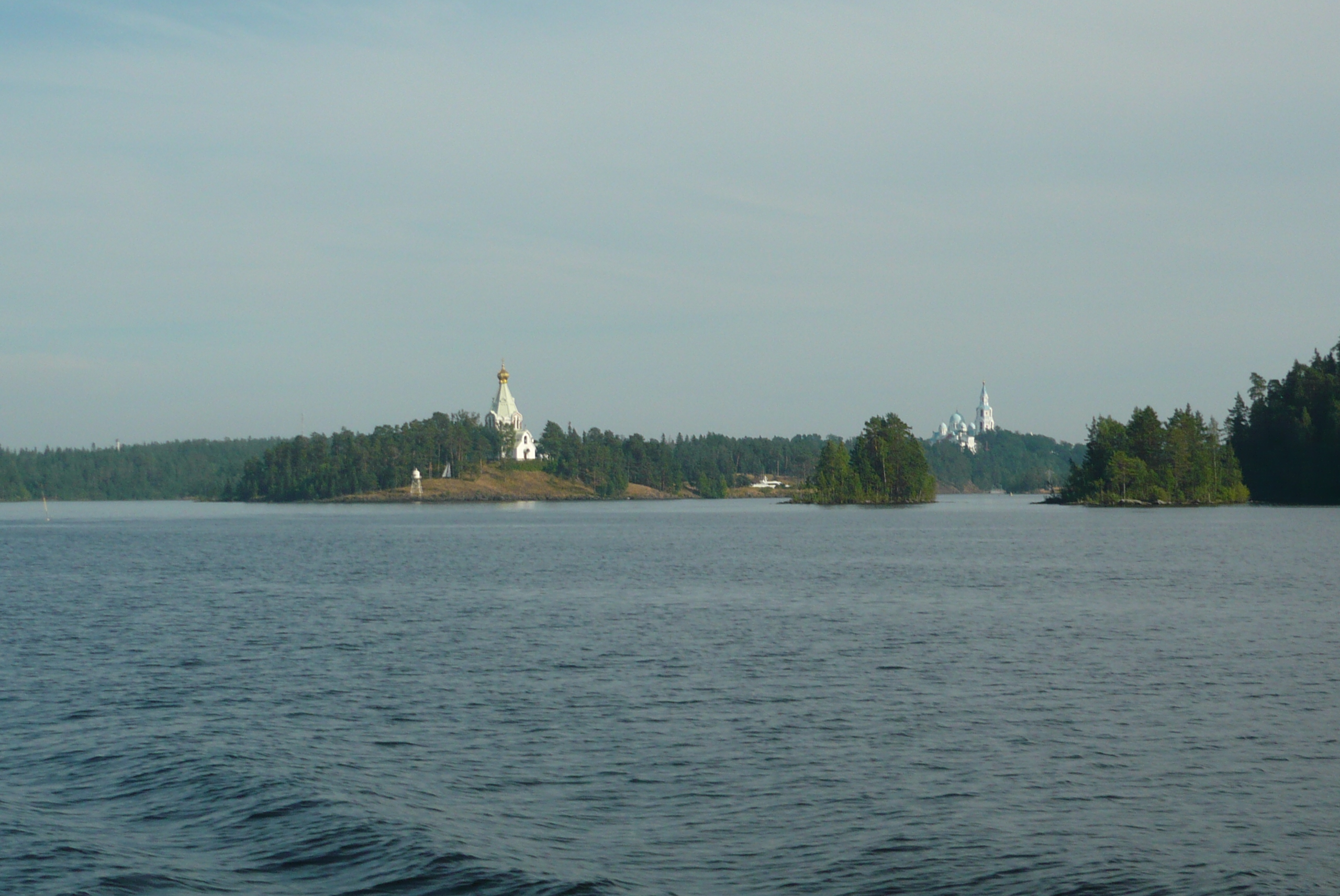
Valaam

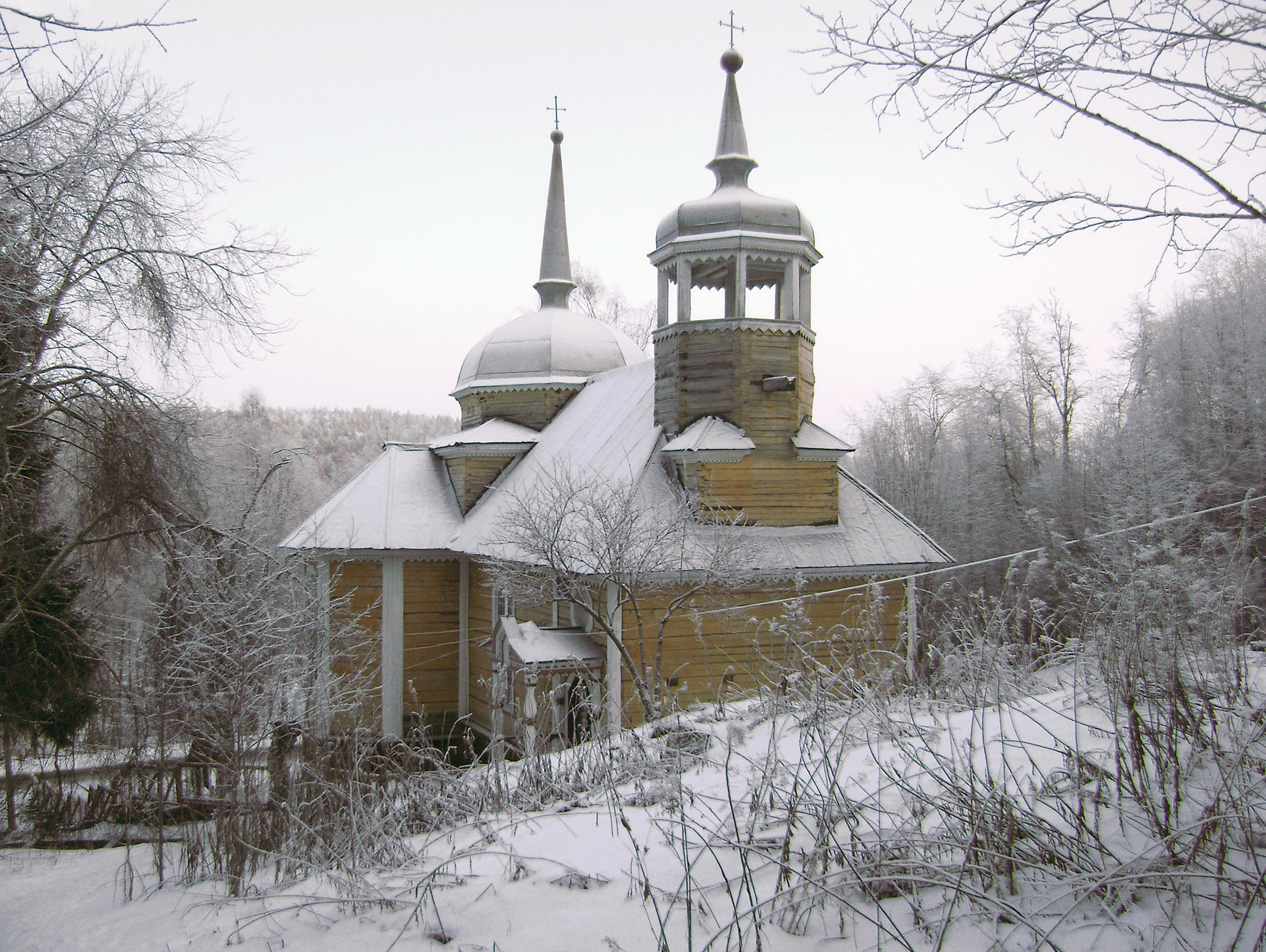
Church of the Apostle Peter in Marcial Waters

==== District and city ====
- Regional Museum of the Northern Ladoga Region (Sortavalsky district)
- Olonets National Museum of Karelians-Livviks named after N. G. Prilukin
- Pudozhsky Local History Museum named after A. F. Korablev
- Medvezhegorsky District Museum
- Pitkyaranta Museum of Local Lore named after V. F. Sebin
- Belomorsky Regional Museum of Local Lore Belomorsky petroglyphs
- Kemsky Regional Museum of Local Lore Pomorie
- Kondopoga City Museum of Local Lore
- Cultural and Museum Center of Kostomuksha
- Segezha Museum Center
- Kurkiek Regional History Center
- Museum of Industrial History of Petrozavodsk (opened in 2011)

==== Private, departmental, enterprise museums ====
- Center for Fire Prevention Propaganda and Public Relations at the Main Directorate of the Ministry of Emergency Situations of Russia in the Republic of Karelia (Petrozavodsk)
- Maritime Museum Polar Odyssey (opened on the territory of the Maritime Historical and Cultural Center, Petrozavodsk)
- Children's Museum of Local Lore (Palace of Creativity of Children and Youth, Petrozavodsk)
- Museum of the History of the Solomenskiy Timber Mill named after L. V. Serkina
- Post Office Museum
- School Museum of Local Lore Karelian hut Kotkozersky rural socio-cultural complex (Olonetsky district, Kotkozero)
- Museum of the History of the Ministry of Internal Affairs of Karelia (Petrozavodsk)
- Historical and demonstration hall of the FSB of Russia in the Republic of Karelia
- Museum of Precambrian Geology of the Institute of Geology KarSC RAS
- Museum of the recent (in one of the workshops of the former Onega Tractor Plant)

=== Theaters ===
- Musical Theater of the Republic of Karelia
- National Theater of the Republic of Karelia
- State Puppet Theater of the Republic of Karelia
- Drama Theater of the Republic of Karelia "Creative Workshop"
- Non-state author's theater "Ad Liberum"

==== Theater companies ====
- Čičiliusku, a puppet theatre company
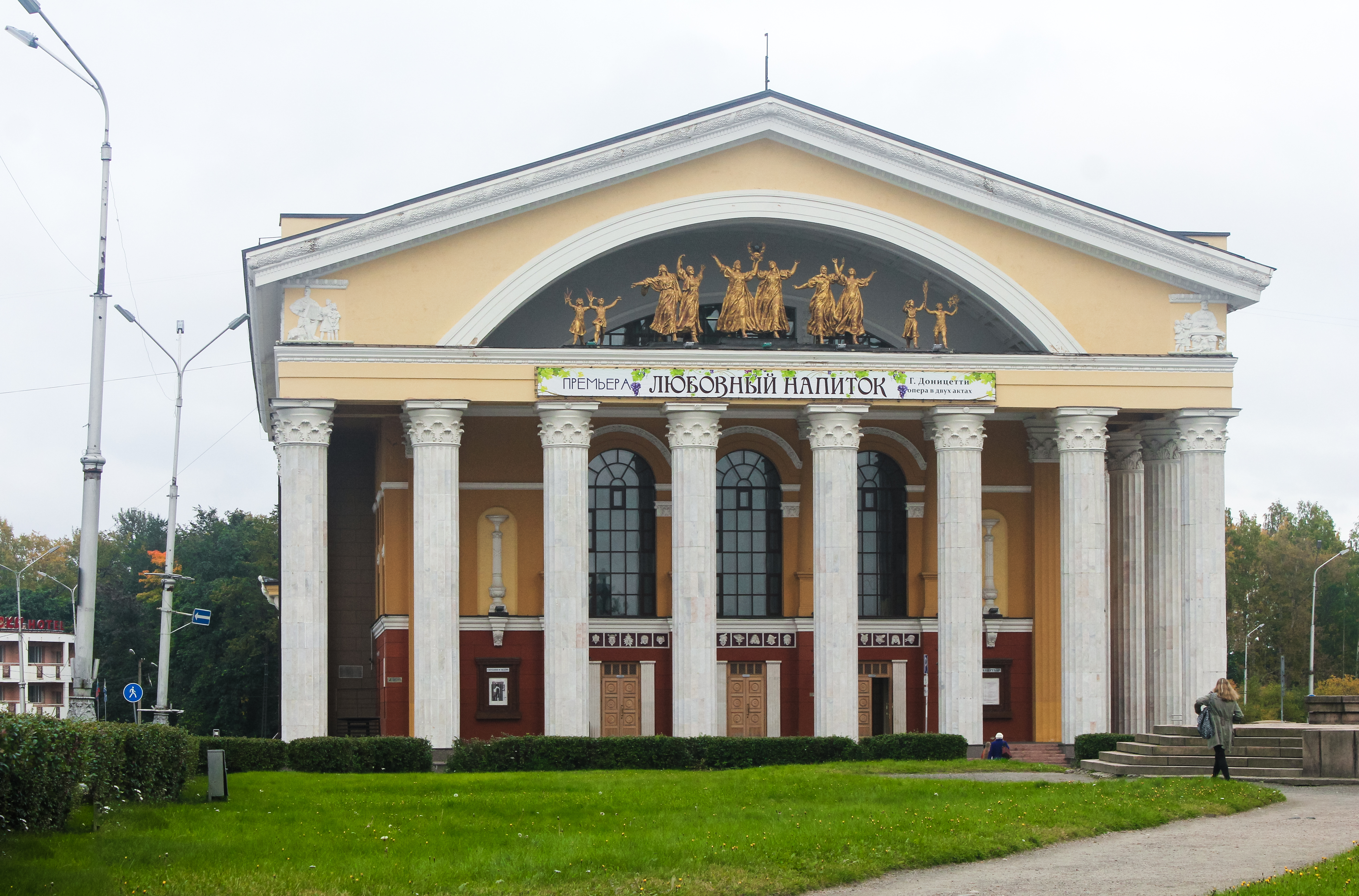
Musical Theater of the Republic of Karelia

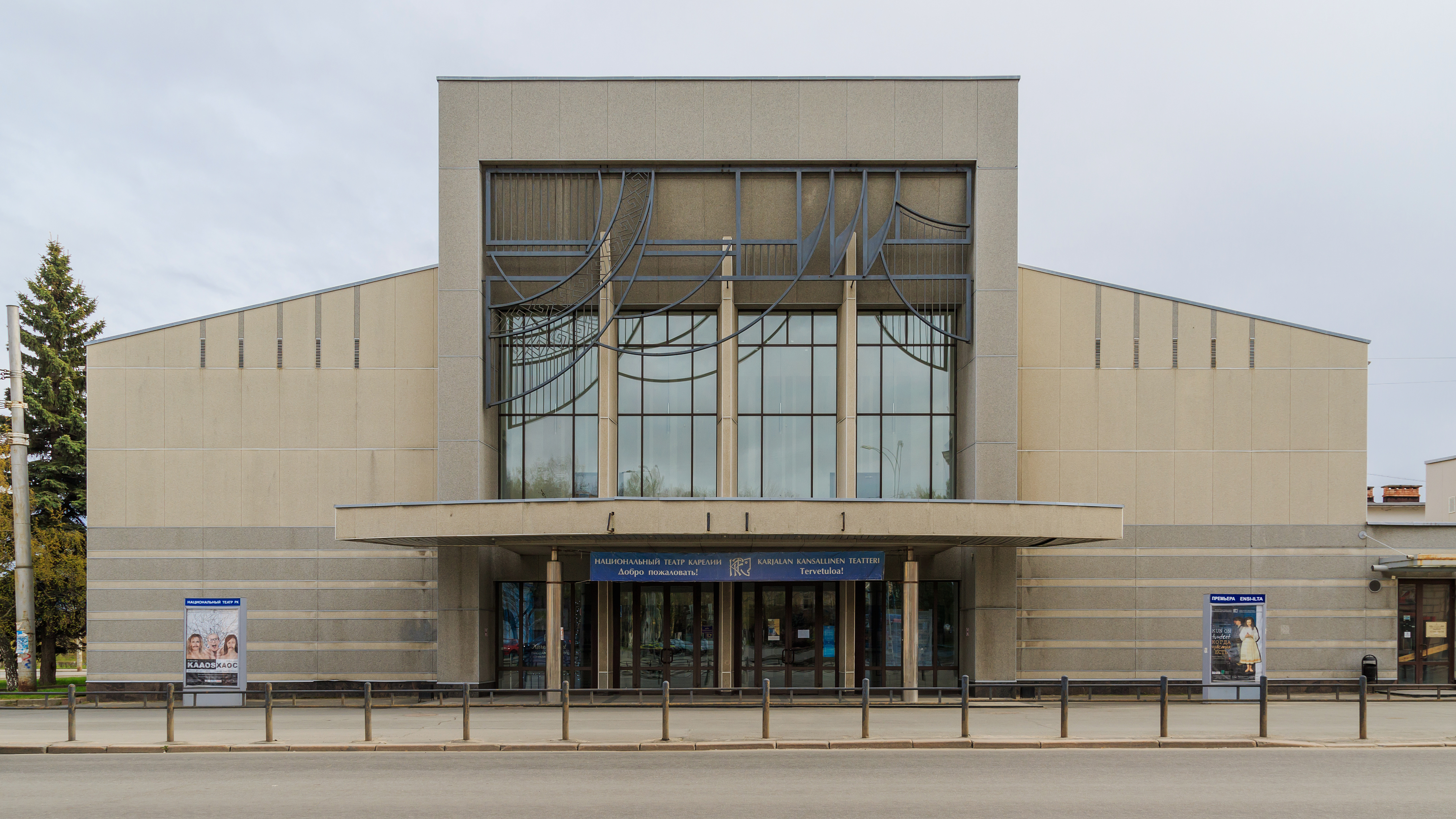
National Theater of the Republic of Karelia

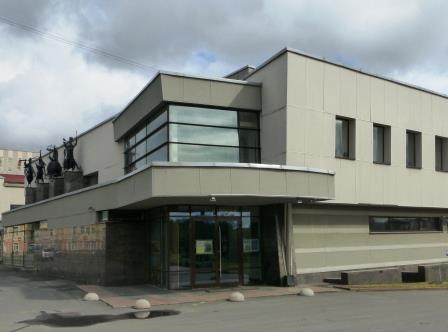
State Puppet Theater of the Republic of Karelia

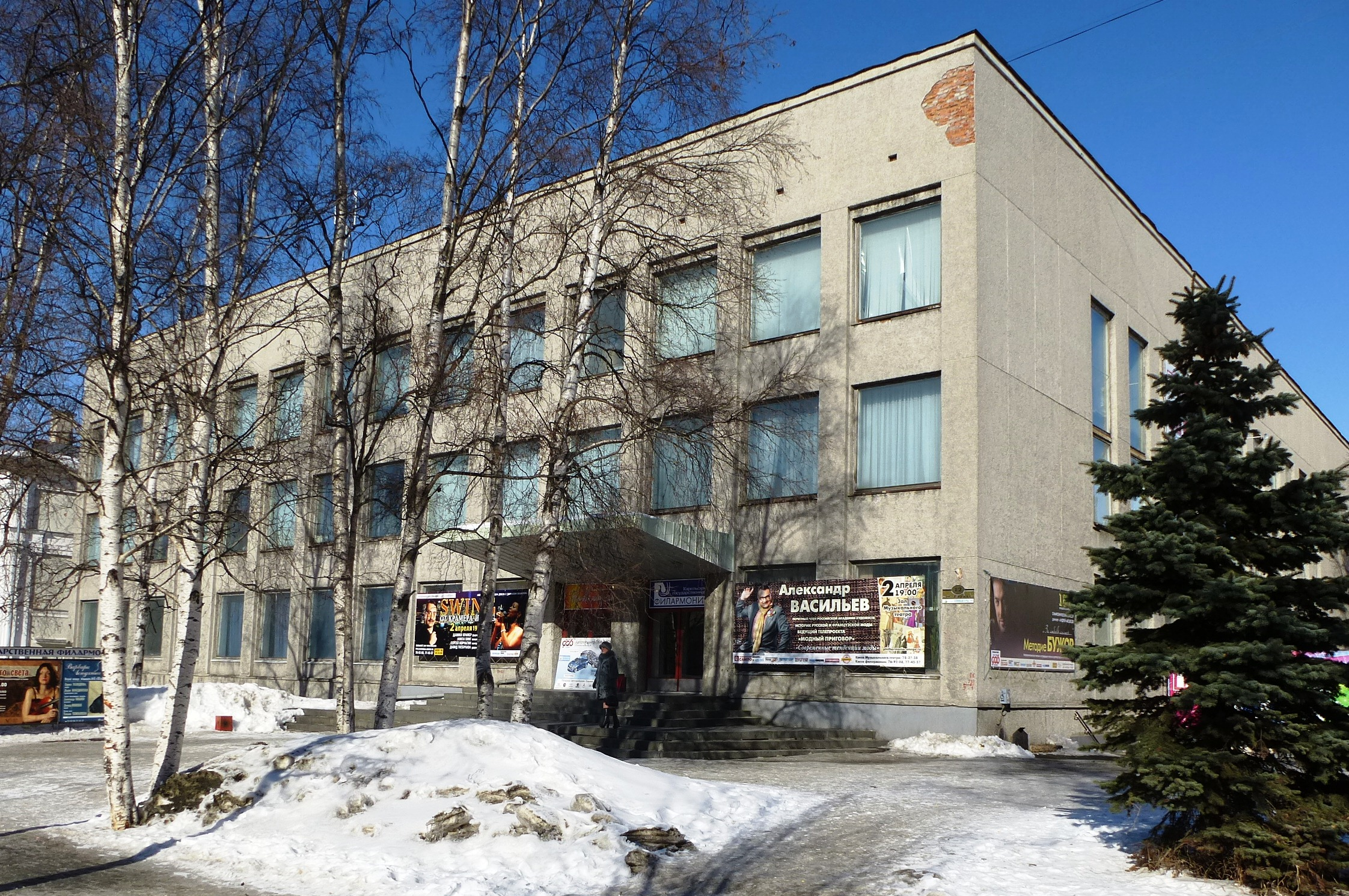
Drama Theater of the Republic of Karelia "Creative Workshop"

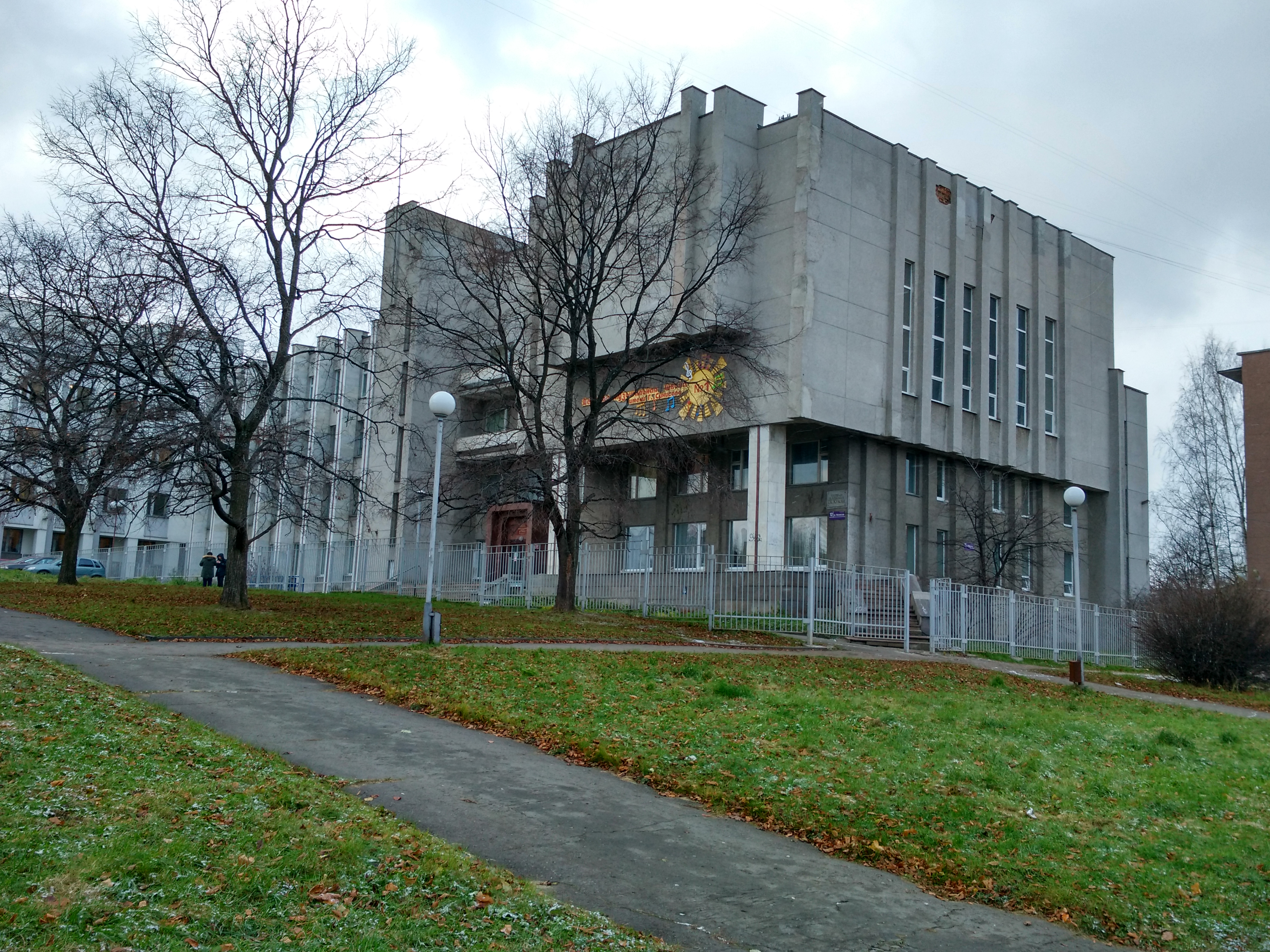
Non-state author's theater "Ad Liberum"

=== Movie ===
In 1973, there were 16 cinemas in the Karelian ASSR.

In 2009, the Ministry of Culture of the Russian Federation developed a digital film screening program in cities with a population of less than 500 thousand people, new cinemas were built in shopping malls. Today, out of 13 cities of the republic, cinemas are operating in all cities except Lahdenpohya.

Only the "Karelfilm" film studio, located in Petrozavodsk, is engaged in film production in Karelia.

=== Mass media ===
In 1957, the Karelian branch of the Union of Journalists of the USSR (now the Karelian branch of the Union of Journalists of Russia) was organized. In different years, the union was headed by F. A. Trofimov, A. I. Shtykov, K. V. Gnetnev, V. N. Kiryasov, V. A. Tolsky, N. N. Meshkova, A.M. Tsygankov. In 1960–1990, the creative work of the best republican journalists was awarded the annual prize named after K. S. Eremeev. Currently, every year on the eve of the Day of the Russian Journalist, the Union of Journalists of Karelia awards two special prizes: "For skill and dignity" and "For openness to the press".

==== Newspapers ====
- Karelia. It is published three times a week. Founder: Legislative Assembly, Government of the Republic of Karelia.
- TVR-Panorama weekly newspaper. Founders: Publishing house PetroPress and Karelian TV company Nika.
- Weekly newspaper Karelian Province.
- Weekly newspaper Moskovskij Komsomolets in Karelia. Founder: CJSC Editorial Office of the newspaper Moskovskij Komsomolets.
- Weekly newspaper Komsomolskaya Pravda in Karelia. Founder: Publishing house Komsomolskaya Pravda.
- Weekly newspaper Arguments and facts in Karelia. Founder: Arguments and Facts.
- Weekly newspaper Youth Newspaper of Karelia. Founder: JSC Kondopoga (Kondopoga pulp and Paper Mill).
- Petrozavodsk University weekly newspaper. Founder: Petrozavodsk State University.
- Leninskaya Pravda. It is published twice a month. Founder: Karelian Republican Organization of the Communist Party.
- The Voice is published twice a month. Founder: Association of Trade Union Organizations of Karelia.
- Lyceum with an appendix-insert My Newspaper +. It is published once a month. Founder: State institution of the Republic of Karelia Publishing House».
- Newspaper Karelian sport. It is published once a month. Founder and publisher: publishing house Majestic.
- Weekly newspaper advertisements: The Bear, etc.

The Legislative Assembly, the Government and the Periodika publishing house produce four newspapers in national languages:

- newspaper Karjalan Sanomat (Karelian News) in Finnish
- newspaper Kodima (Native land) in Vepsian and Russian languages

together with the regional organization Union of Karelian People:

- newspaper Oma Mua (Native Land) in the Livvikov dialect of the Karelian language;
- newspaper Vienan Karjala (White Sea Karelia) in the Karelian dialect of the Karelian language.

Newspapers are published in the districts of Karelia: Kostomuksha News, Prionezhye, Olonia, Novaya Kondopoga, Belomorskaya Tribune, Ladoga-Sortavala, Kalevala News, Pudozhsky Vestnik, Suoyarvsky Vestnik, Circumpolar, Soviet White Sea, Novaya Ladoga, MuezerskLes, Call, Our life, Trust, Dialogue.

==== Magazines ====
- Sever – a monthly literary, artistic, socio-political magazine in Russian. Founder: the Government of Karelia.
- Carelia (Karelia) – a monthly literary and artistic magazine in Finnish, Karelian (Livvikov and Karelian dialects proper), Vepsian languages. Founders: Ministry of National Policy and Relations with Religious Associations of Karelia, Ingermanland Union of Finns of Karelia, Union of Karelian People, Vepsian Culture Society, Periodika publishing house.
- Kipinä (Sparkle) – monthly children's illustrated magazine in Finnish. Founders: The Ministry of Education of Karelia and the publishing house Periodika.
- Industrial Bulletin of Karelia is a periodical specialized magazine in Russian.

==== Radio ====
Nine radio stations are located in Petrozavodsk:

- Radio Karelia (State Television and Radio Broadcasting Company «Karelia»)
- Russian Radio on Onego
- Avtoradio-Petrozavodsk
- Radio Yunost Petrozavodsk. The radio station is part of the holding of VGTRK
- Road Radio. It is part of the media holding Nika
- Our Radio. Part of the media holding Nika
- Europe Plus Petrozavodsk
- Retro Fm on Onego
- Second Wave

Three radio stations broadcast in Kostomuksha:

- FM radio station of JSC Karelian okatysh
- Local radio
- Kostomuksha city radio edition Radio Kostomukshi

==== Television ====
On 29 April 1959, the television center and the Petrozavodsk Television Studio came into operation.

Regional TV companies:

- Branch of VGTRK GTRK Karelia
- Autonomous institution of the Republic of Karelia RTK Sampo
- Nika (LLC TC NKM)
- TNT-Onego (LLC RIA TV6 Moscow-Petronet)

The TV channel GTRK Karelia has daily news releases Viestit – Karjala in Finnish.

==== Online editions ====
According to a sociological study of the regional media market conducted in October 2013, the largest share of the media of the Republic of Karelia in terms of the number of published materials belongs to online publications – 77.3%.

- Official portal of state authorities of the Republic of Karelia
- Online magazine Republic
- Online newspaper Karelia
- Online newspaper Stolitsa na Onego
- Karelinform
- Center for Political and Social Research

and others.

=== Holidays ===
Along with Russian holidays, Karelia has its official public holidays as well as unofficial holidays.

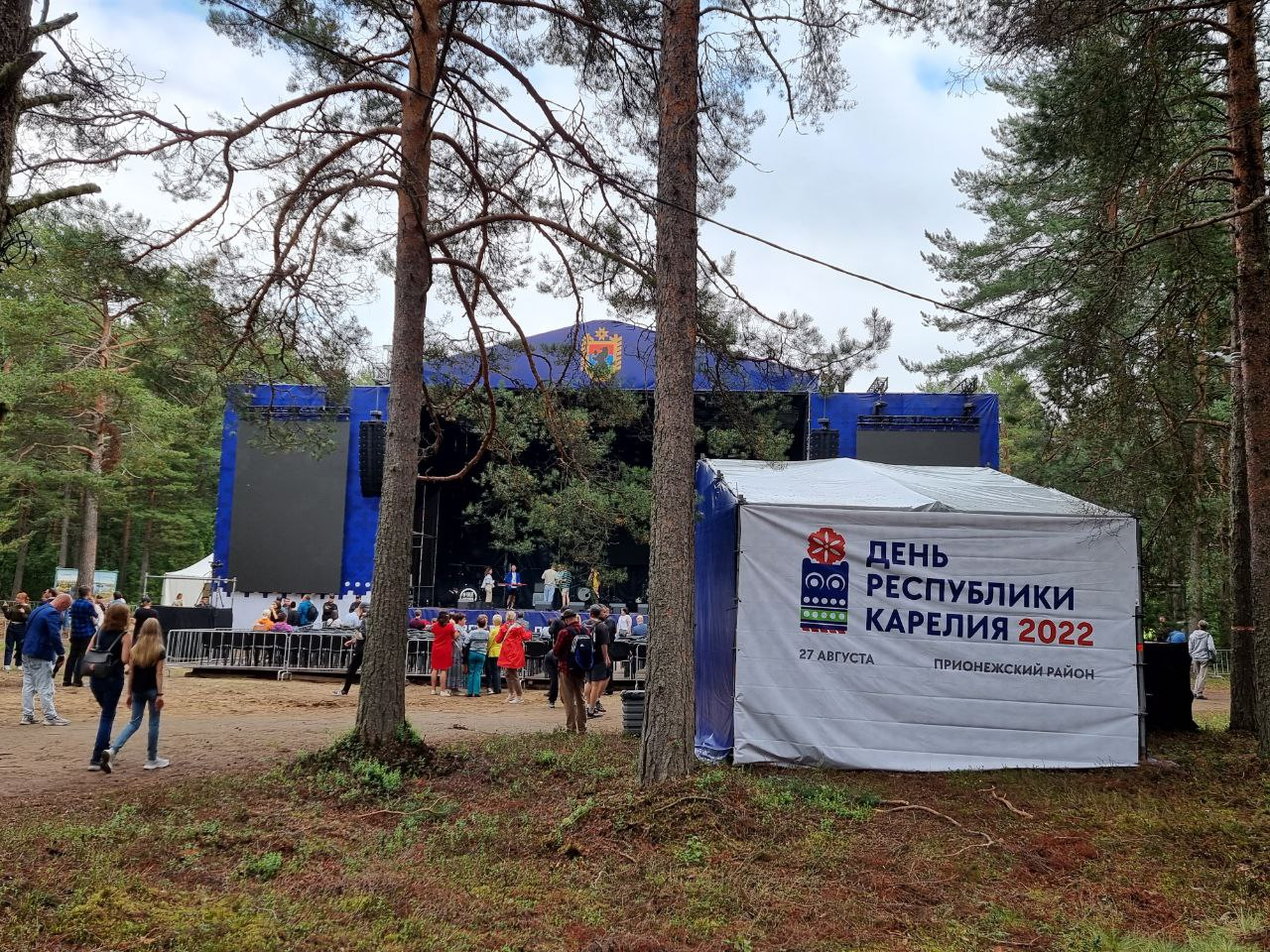
Republic Day, 2022

==== Official ====
Date	Name	Russian name	Remarks
18 April	Day of firefighters of the Republic of Karelia	День пожарной охраны Республики Карелия	Holiday celebrating Karelian fire defense became official in 1998.
31 May	Day of cultural workers of the Republic of Karelia	День работника культуры Республики Карелия	Holiday celebrating Karelian workers in the culture industry, became official in 2000
Summer (Official 8 June)	Republic of Karelia day (Republic Day)	День Республики Карелия	Holiday celebrating creation of the Karelian Labour commune, became official in 1999
16 September	Day of formation of the trade union movement in Karelia	День образования профсоюзного движения в Карелии	Holiday celebrating Karelian trade unions and worker's rights, became official in 2011
30 September	Day of the liberation of Karelia from fascist invaders	День освобождения Карелии от фашистских захватчиков	Holiday celebrating liberation from Finnish occupation during WW2

==== Religious ====
Date	Name	Karelian name	Russian name	Remarks
7 January to 18 January	Winter religious Holidays	Vierissänkesk, Sv'atkat, Sunduma	Зимние святки	Celebrations after Christmas
19 January	Baptism	Vieristä, Vieristy, Vederis	Крещение	Prelude to Maslenitsa
6 May	Saint George's Day	Jyrin päivä, Jyrrinpäivy, Kevät Jyrgi	Егорьев день	
22 May	Nikola Veshny	Pyhä Miikkula, Miikkulan päivä, Miikkulanpäivy, Mikula	Никола Вешний	Day celebrating Saint Nicholas
End of July	Bowl of Ukko	Ukon vakka	Чаша Укко	Ancient pre-Christian agricultural holiday
7 July	Ivan's Day	Iivnanpäivä, Iivananpäivy, Ivananpäivä	Иванов день	Holiday celebrating summer solstice
From the end of Ivan's day before Saint Peter's day	Summer religious holidays	Kezäsv’atkat, Kesäsvätkat	Летние святки	Prelude to Saint-Peter's day
12 July	Saint Peter's day	Petrunpäivä, Pedrunpäivy, Pedrunpäivä	Петров день	Celebrations before harvest
2 August	Elijah's day	Il’l’anpäivä, Il’l’anpäiväy	Ильин день	
31 August	Frol's Day	Frolan päivä	Фролов день	Local holidas of livestock protection
End of October	Kekri	Kekri, Kegri	Кегри	Ancient autumn festival
25 December	Christmas	Rostuo	Католическое Рождество	Western Christmas is celebrated by Karelian Finns

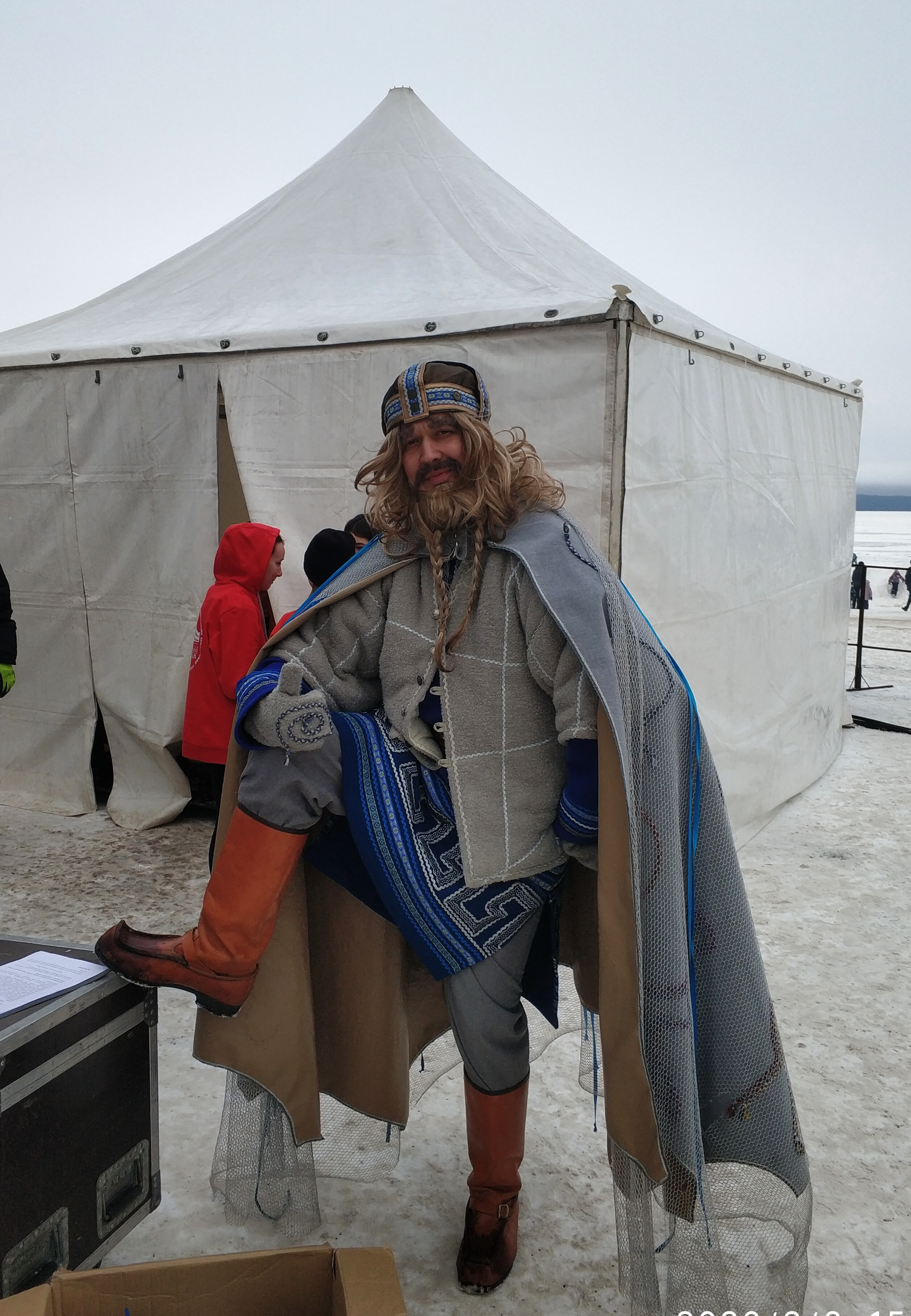
Hyperborea Festival in Petrozavodsk

===== Cultural =====
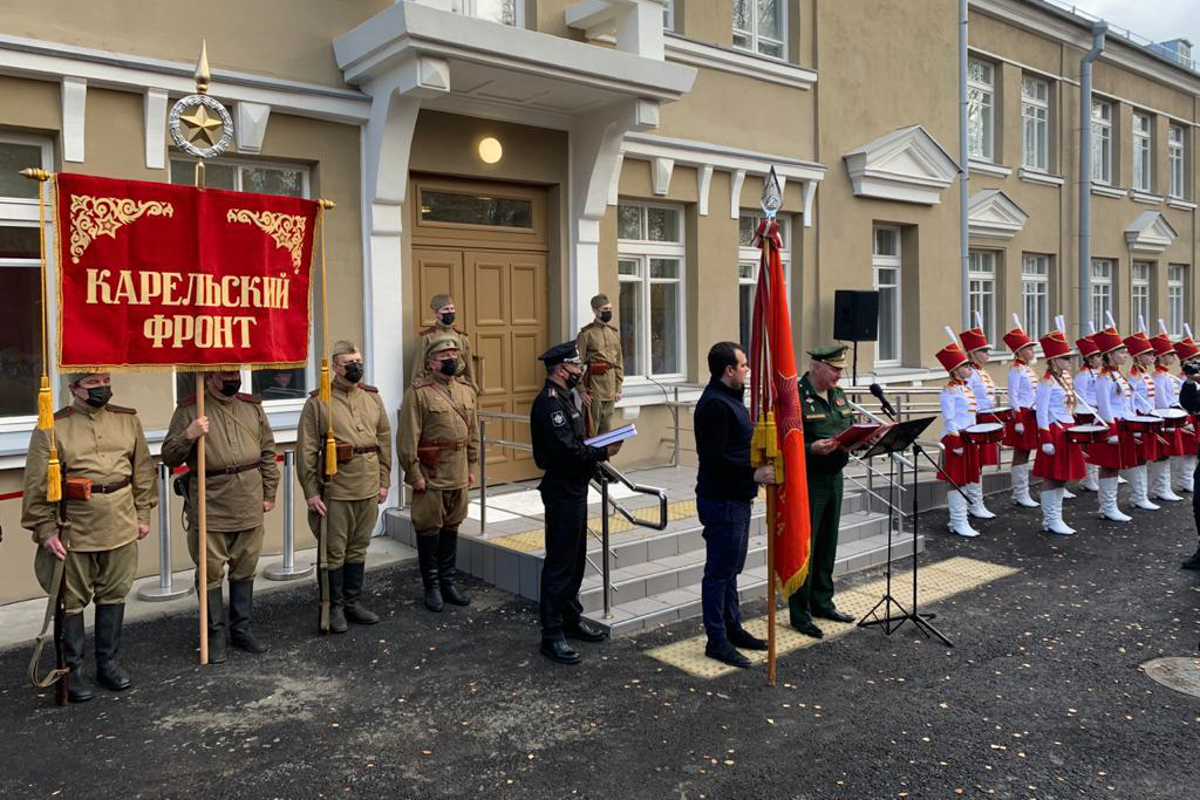
Museum of the Karelian Front, Medvezhyegorsk, Karelia

Region	Date	Name	Russian name	Remarks
All of Karelia	April	Day of Karelian and Vepsian writing	День карельской и вепсской письменности	Cultural holiday of karelians and vepsians
All of Karelia	February	Kalevala Day	День Калевалы	Day celebrating national epic Kalevala
All of Karelia	February	International Mother Language Day	Международный день родного языка	
All of Karelia	Autumn	Kegri	Кегри	Gained government support in 2022
Belomorskyi	November	Holiday of Pomors of the Karelian coast "Nikola Zimniy"	Праздник поморов Карельского берега «Никола Зимний»	Pomor holiday
Kalevalskyi	June	International holiday of Ukhta Karelians	Международный праздник Ухтинских карел	North Karelian holiday
Kemskyi	August	Indian Summer in the Kem Pomorye	Бабье лето в Кемском поморье	Pomor holiday
Kemskyi		Day of the Dead Poduzhemsky villages	День погибших подужемских деревень	Day remembering abandoned villages of North Karelia
Kemskyi	May	Holiday of men's craft "Oars on the water"	Праздник мужских ремесле «Весла на воду»	
Louhskyi	June	Interregional holiday "Hello, Kestenga!"	Межрегиональный праздник «Здравствуй, Кестеньга!»	North Karelian holiday
Louhskyi	August	Holiday "Fairytale ship Korguev"	Праздник «Сказочный корабль Коргуева»	Holiyday in Chupa
Louhskyi	August	Holiday "Old Woman Louhi's Day"	Праздник «День старухи Лоухи»	Holiday celebrating Kalevala
Louhskyi	August	Kanšallenen puku ompelos	Каншалленен пуку омпелуш	Holiday in Sofporog
Muyezerskyi	March	Interdistrict cultural and sports festival "Winter fun"	Межрайонный культурно-спортивный праздник «Зимние забавы»	Holiday in Muyezersky
Muyezerskyi		Karelian-Finnish friendship holiday of the village of Ondozero and the village of Yolyolä (Finland)	Карело-финский праздник дружбы села Ондозеро и деревни Ёлёля (Финляндия)	
Olonetskyi	May	Ecological festival "Olonets – goose capital"	Экологический фестиваль «Олония-гусиная столица»	Holiday in Olonets
Olonetskyi	December	Olonets Father Frost Games	Олонецкие Игры Дедов Морозов	Holiday in Olonets
Petrozavodsk	February	Международный зимний фестиваль «Гиперборея»	International winter festival "Hyperborea"	Ice sculpture festival
Prionezhskyi		Prionezhsky song wreath	Прионежский песенный венок	
Prionezhskyi		Elonpuu (Tree of life)	Древо жизни	Veps holiday
Pryazhinskyi	March	"Kulyan kižat"	«Кюлян кижат»	Holiday in Vedlozero
Pryazhinskyi		Holiday of Karelian culture	Праздник карельской культуры	Holiday in Kinerma
Pudozhskyi	June	Interregional holiday "Dawns of Pudozh"	Межрегиональный праздник «Зори Пудожья»	Holiday in Pudozh
Pudozhskyi	June	Holiday of Russian epic culture "In the land of the epic"	Праздник русской эпической культуры «В краю былинной»	Holiday in Semenovo
Segezshky	June	Ethnocultural holiday "Voitsk festivities"	Этнокультурный праздник «Воицкие гуляния»	Holiday in Nadvoitsy

== See also ==
- Karelian Isthmus
- Sami music
- Pegrema
- Aleksandr Balandin (gymnast)
