= 2017 Karelian head election =

← 2002	10 September 2017	2022 →
- Turnout: 29.3%
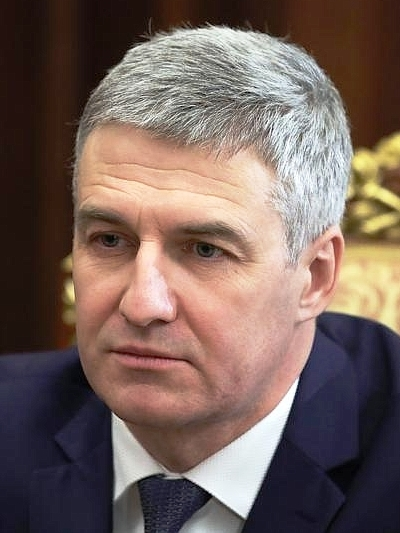

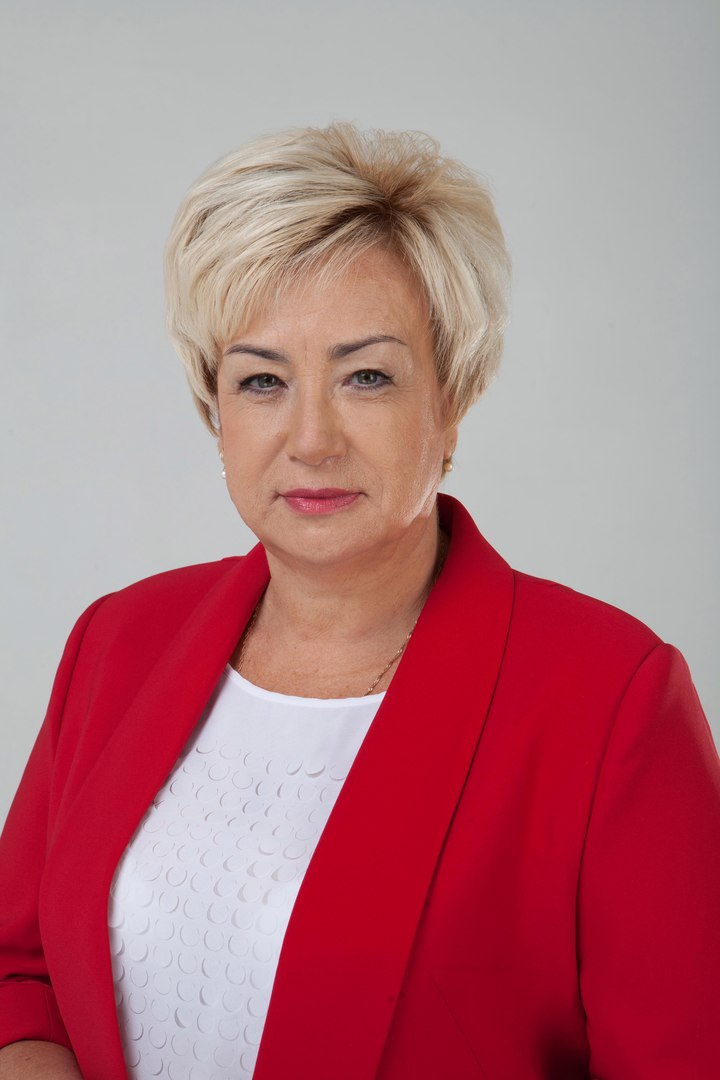
Nominee	Artur Parfenchikov	Irina Petelyaeva
Party	United Russia	SR
Popular vote	95,822	28,203
Percentage	61.3%	18.57%
	CPRF	LDPR
Nominee	Yevgeny Ulyanov	Yevgeny Besedny
Party	CPRF	LDPR
Popular vote	18,942	8,877
Percentage	12.47%	5.84%
- 2017 election of the Head of Karelia results by municipality
Acting Governor before election
Artur Parfenchikov
Independent
Governor
Artur Parfenchikov
United Russia

The 2017 Republic of Karelia head election took place on 10 September 2017, on common election day. Acting Head Artur Parfenchikov was elected for his first full term. It was the first direct Karelia head election in 15 years since Sergey Katanandov won his second term in April 2002.

== Background ==
Head of Karelia Alexander Khudilainen was appointed in May 2012. On 8 February 2017 reports emerged that Khudilainen wouldn't run for a second term, and on 15 February he announced his resignation. Khudilainen allegedly wanted to seek reelection, however, several factors attributed to his resignation, including conflicts with local elite, poor ratings and problems with emergency shelter resettlement program.

Federal Bailiffs Service Director Artur Parfenchikov was appointed acting Head of Karelia, among other mentioned candidates were Head of the Federal Agency for Forestry Ivan Valentik and Head of Karelian FSSP Andrey Galyamov. Parfenchikov later announced his run for a full term in office.

Regional leader of A Just Russia Irina Petelyaeva initially was rumoured to be Parfenchikov's candidate for a Federation Council, in exchange the party didn't field State Duma member Anatoly Greshnevikov against acting Governor Dmitry Mironov in Yaroslavl Oblast gubernatorial election, however, the arrangement feel through and Petelyaeva launched her campaign. One of main republican opposition parties, Yabloko declined to nominate a candidate, citing inability to pass through a municipal filter.

== Candidates ==
Only political parties can nominate candidates for head election in Karelia, self-nomination is not possible. However, candidate is not obliged to be a member of the nominating party. Candidate for Head of Karelia should be a Russian citizen and at least 30 years old. Each candidate in order to be registered is required to collect at least 7% of signatures of members and heads of municipalities (88-92 signatures). Also gubernatorial candidates present 3 candidacies to the Federation Council and election winner later appoints one of the presented candidates.

=== Registered ===
Candidates who withdrew from the election, but their names were already entered in the ballot

Candidate	Party	Office
Yevgeny Besedny; Born 1987 (age 30)	Liberal Democratic Party	Member of Legislative Assembly of the Republic of Karelia
Yelena Gnyotova (Note: Supported Artur Parfenchikov); Born 1962 (age 55)	Party of Growth	Commissioner for the protection of the rights of entrepreneurs in the Republic of Karelia
Olga Ilyukova; Born 1958 (age 58)	Patriots of Russia	Retired
Artur Parfenchikov; Born 1964 (age 52)	United Russia (Note: Independent, nominated by United Russia)	acting Head of Republic, former Director of the Federal Bailiffs Service (2008-2017)
Irina Petelyaeva; Born 1959 (age 58)	A Just Russia	Member of Legislative Assembly of the Republic of Karelia, former Member of State Duma (2016)
Nikolay Tarakanov (Note: Supported Artur Parfenchikov); Born 1977 (age 40)	Rodina	Director of "АК1126", former Member of Petrozavodsk City Council
Yevgeny Ulyanov; Born 1977 (age 39)	Communist Party	Member of Legislative Assembly of the Republic of Karelia, aide to State Duma member Zhores Alfyorov

=== Failed to qualify ===
- Igor Alpeyev (People Against Corruption), businessman
- Maria Avisheva (Young Russia), Co-Chair of the Petrozavodsk Union of Industrialists and Entrepreneurs

=== Eliminated in primary ===
- Anna Lopatkina (United Russia), Member of Legislative Assembly of the Republic of Karelia, chair of ONF regional executive committee
- Anatoly Voronin (United Russia), Rector of Petrozavodsk State University

=== Declined ===
- Galina Shirshina (Yabloko), former Mayor of Petrozavodsk (2013-2015)
- Emilia Slabunova (Yabloko), Member of Legislative Assembly of the Republic of Karelia, chair of Yabloko party

=== Candidates for the Federation Council ===
Incumbent Senator Sergey Katanandov (United Russia) was not renominated.

- Yevgeny Besedny (LDPR):
  - Aleksey Orlov, Member of Legislative Assembly of the Republic of Karelia
  - Yelizaveta Vasilyeva, Member of Petrozavodsk City Council, charity foundation director
  - Timur Zornyakov, Member of Legislative Assembly of the Republic of Karelia
- Artur Parfenchikov (UR):
  - Vitaly Krasulin, Member of Legislative Assembly of the Republic of Karelia
  - Alexander Rakitin, Head of FSB Office in Western Military District
  - Elissan Shandalovich, Chairman of Legislative Assembly of the Republic of Karelia
- Irina Petelyaeva (SR):
  - Yury Davydov, Head of Chupa Urban District
  - Valentina Polishchuk, chair of Russian Red Cross Society Karelian branch
  - Larisa Stepanova, Member of Legislative Assembly of the Republic of Karelia
- Yevgeny Ulyanov (CPRF):
  - Tatyana Bogdanova, Member of Legislative Assembly of the Republic of Karelia
  - Svetlana Loginova, former Member of Legislative Assembly of the Republic of Karelia (2011-2016)
  - Galina Vasilyeva, member of Petrozavodsk City Council

== Opinion polls ==
Date	Poll source	Parfenchikov	Petelyaeva	Ulyanov	Besedny	Tarakanov	Gnyotova	Ilyukova	Undecided	Abstention	Spoil the Ballot
25 July–5 August 2017	Megapolis	38%	15%	4%	4%	2.4%	1%	0.2%	35.4%	–	–
17–25 July 2017	FOM	43%	3%	2%	1%	1%	<1%	<1%	34%	14%	1%

== Result ==
Candidate	Party	Votes	%
Artur Parfenchikov	United Russia	95,822	66.11%
Irina Petelyaeva	A Just Russia	28,203	18.57%
Yevgeny Ulyanov	Communist Party	18,942	12.47%
Yevgeny Besedny	Liberal Democratic Party	8,877	5.84%
Valid ballots		151,844	97.20%
Invalid ballots		4,371	2.80%
Total		156,215	100%
Registered voters / Turnout		534,015	29.26%

Aleksandr Rakitin was appointed to the Federation Council, replacing incumbent Senator Sergey Katanandov.

== See also ==
- 2017 Russian gubernatorial elections
