= 2022 Karelian head election =

- 9—11 September 2022
- Turnout: 27.93%
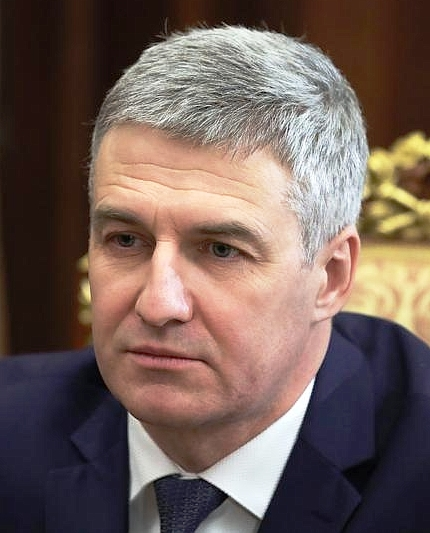
		SR-ZP	CPRF
Nominee	Artur Parfenchikov	Andrey Rogalevich	Yevgeny Ulyanov
Party	United Russia	SR-ZP	CPRF
Popular vote	97,534	18,910	17,834
Percentage	69.15%	13.41%	12.64%
Head before election
Artur Parfenchikov
United Russia
Elected Head
Artur Parfenchikov
United Russia

The 2022 Republic of Karelia head election took place on 9–11 September 2022, on common election day. Incumbent Head Artur Parfenchikov was re-elected to a second term.

== Background ==
Federal Bailiffs Service Director Artur Parfenchikov was appointed Head of Karelia in February 2017, replacing Alexander Khudilainen. Officially an independent, Parfenchikov was nominated by United Russia as its head candidate in the following election, which he won with 61.34%.

During first term Parfenchikov faced numerous rumours about his potential resignation due to regional elite conflicts and general lack of accomplishments. In the 2021 Russian legislative election United Russia received 31.69% in Karelia, its 7th worst result nationally, which further fuelled speculations about Parfenchikov's replacement. However, Vedomosti reported in January 2022 that Artur Parfenchikov most likely would retain his position, and in May 2022 President Vladimir Putin endorsed Parfenchikov for reelection.

Due to the start of the Russian invasion of Ukraine in February 2022 and subsequent economic sanctions the cancellation and postponement of direct gubernatorial elections was proposed. The measure was even supported by A Just Russia leader Sergey Mironov. Eventually, the postponement never occurred, as on 3 June Legislative Assembly of the Republic of Karelia called head election for 11 September 2022.

In February 2022 regional CPRF and SR-ZP revealed that the parties were discussing a potential coalition in the upcoming election: one party would nominate a candidate for Head of Karelia, while candidate of the other party would be appointed to the Federation Council.

== Candidates ==
Only political parties can nominate candidates for head election in Karelia, self-nomination is not possible. However, candidate is not obliged to be a member of the nominating party. Candidate for Head of Karelia should be a Russian citizen and at least 30 years old. Each candidate in order to be registered is required to collect at least 7% of signatures of members and heads of municipalities (84-88 signatures). Also gubernatorial candidates present 3 candidacies to the Federation Council and election winner later appoints one of the presented candidates.

=== Registered ===
- Anatoly Dudarin (DPR), unemployed
- Ivan Kadayas (Rodina), hiking tour guide
- Artur Parfenchikov (United Russia), incumbent Head of Karelia
- Andrey Rogalevich (SR-ZP), Member of Petrozavodsk City Council, former Member of Legislative Assembly of the Republic of Karelia (2011-2021)
- Yevgeny Ulyanov (CPRF), Member of Legislative Assembly of the Republic of Karelia, 2017 head candidate

=== Withdrew after registration ===
- Dmitry Fabrikantov (Party of Growth), businessman
- Valery Taborov (RPPSS), chairman of DOSAAF regional office

=== Failed to qualify ===
- Mikhail Fyodorov (New People), individual entrepreneur

=== Did not file ===
- Denis Bazankov (RPSS), journalist, former TV host
- Anna Dmitriyeva (Cossack Party), rifleman at Ministry of Transport guard
- Pavel Nesterov (Communists of Russia), administrator at the Center of Folk Art and Cultural Initiatives
- Aleksandr Pakkuyev (LDPR), Member of Legislative Assembly of the Republic of Karelia
- Sergey Yarlykov (Green Alternative), salesman

=== Declined ===
- Aleksey Orlov (LDPR), Member of Legislative Assembly of the Republic of Karelia
- Emilia Slabunova (Yabloko), Member of Legislative Assembly of the Republic of Karelia

=== Candidates for Federation Council ===
- Anatoly Dudarin (DPR):
  - Nadezhda Romanova, storekeeper
  - Irina Tasova, store director
  - Anna Yakovleva, chair of Union of Karelian People
- Dmitry Fabrikantov (Party of Growth):
  - Denis Korchin, businessman
  - Andrey Yerkoyev, businessman, hockey player
  - Igor Zhukov, businessman
- Mikhail Fyodorov (New People):
  - Aleksey Goryayev, unemployed
  - Yury Kushnir, teacher of additional education
  - Vladimir Kvanin, Member of Legislative Assembly of the Republic of Karelia
- Ivan Kadayas (Rodina):
  - Diana Bakhta, accountant
  - Andrey Grechnev, chairman of Rodina regional office
  - Zulfiya Yankina, pensioner
- Artur Parfenchikov (United Russia):
  - Vladimir Chizhov, Ambassador of Russia to the European Union
  - Nadezhda Dreyzis, Chair of Petrozavodsk City Council, chief doctor at city children policlinic №1
  - Aleksandr Rakitin, incumbent Senator
- Andrey Rogalevich (SR-ZP):
  - Tatyana Kokhanskaya, Member of Ledmozero Council, teacher
  - Irina Safonova, Head of Shyoltozero
  - Mikhail Ukhanov, Member of Legislative Assembly of the Republic of Karelia
- Valery Taborov (RPPSS):
  - Andrey Manin, chairman of RPPSS regional office, former Minister of Karelia for Nationalities' and Regional Policy (2006-2017)
  - Yury Stepanov, transport security inspector at Petrozavodsk Airport
  - Lidia Suvorova, Member of Legislative Assembly of the Republic of Karelia
- Yevgeny Ulyanov (CPRF):
  - Sergey Andrunevich, Member of Legislative Assembly of the Republic of Karelia
  - Maria Gogoleva (SR-ZP), Member of Legislative Assembly of the Republic of Karelia
  - Gennady Stepanov, former mayor of Olonets (2007-2011)

== Finances ==
All sums are in rubles.

Financial Report	Source	Bazankov	Dmitriyeva	Dudarin	Fabrikantov	Fyodorov	Kadayas	Nesterov	Pakkuyev	Parfenchikov	Rogalevich	Taborov	Ulyanov	Yarlykov
First		950,000	250,000	250,000	1,150,000	54,215,000	625,000	6,400,000	500,000	60,250,000	111,800	750,000	750,000	350,000
Final		TBD	TBD	TBD	TBD	TBD	TBD	TBD	TBD	TBD	TBD	TBD	TBD	TBD

== Results ==
Summary of the 9–11 September 2022 Karelia head election results
Candidate	Party	Votes	%
Artur Parfenchikov (incumbent)	United Russia	97,534	69.15
Andrey Rogalevich	A Just Russia — For Truth	18,910	13.41
Yevgeny Ulyanov	Communist Party	17,834	12.64
Anatoly Dudarin	Democratic Party	2,330	1.65
Ivan Kadayas	Rodina	865	0.61
Valid votes		137,473	97.46
Blank ballots		3,580	2.54
Total		141,053	100.00
Turnout		141,053	27.93
Registered voters		504,958	100.00

Ambassador of Russia to the European Union Vladimir Chizhov (Independent) was appointed to the Federation Council, replacing incumbent senator Aleksandr Rakitin (Independent).

== See also ==
- 2022 Russian gubernatorial elections
