= Vladimir Krupkin =

Russian politician

- Владимир Крупкин

Plenipotentiary Representative in the Ural Federal District
- Acting; 2 December 2008 – 8 December 2008
- President: Dmitry Medvedev
- Preceded by: Pyotr Latyshev
- Succeeded by: Nikolay Vinnichenko

Personal details
- Born: Vladimir Leonidovich Krupkin; 16 September 1946 (age 79) Omsk Oblast, Soviet Union

Vladimir Leonidovich Krupkin (Russian: Владимир Леонидович Крупкин; born on 16 September 1946), is a Russian politician who served as the acting Plenipotentiary Representative in the Ural Federal District in December 2008.

== Biography ==
Vladimir Krupkin was born in Omsk Oblast on 16 September 1946.

In 1969, he graduated from the Omsk Polytechnic Institute with a degree in mechanical engineering.

From 1969 to 1971, he served in the Soviet Army.

From 1971 to 1972, he was in service in the Ministry of Internal Affairs of the Omsk Oblast.

In 2003, he was the First Deputy Head of the Federal Security Service Directorate for the Sverdlovsk Oblast.

In 2004, Krupkin was the Assistant to the Plenipotentiary Representative of the Ural Federal District, serving under Pyotr Latyshev.

In June 2007, he became the Deputy Plenipotentiary Representative, responsible for interactions with law enforcement agencies.

Krukpin became the acting Plenipotentiary Representative of the Ural Federal District, on 2 December 2008, after Latyshev died from heart failure. On 8 December 2008, he was officially replaced by Nikolay Vinnichenko in Latyshev's place.

In November 2009, by order of the Chief of Staff of the Presidential Administration of the Russia Sergey Naryshkin, Krupkin was relieved of his post "at his own request and in connection with the transfer to another job."

He is married, and has two sons.
