= Galina Shirshina =

Galina Igorevna Shirshina Галина Игоревна Ширшина
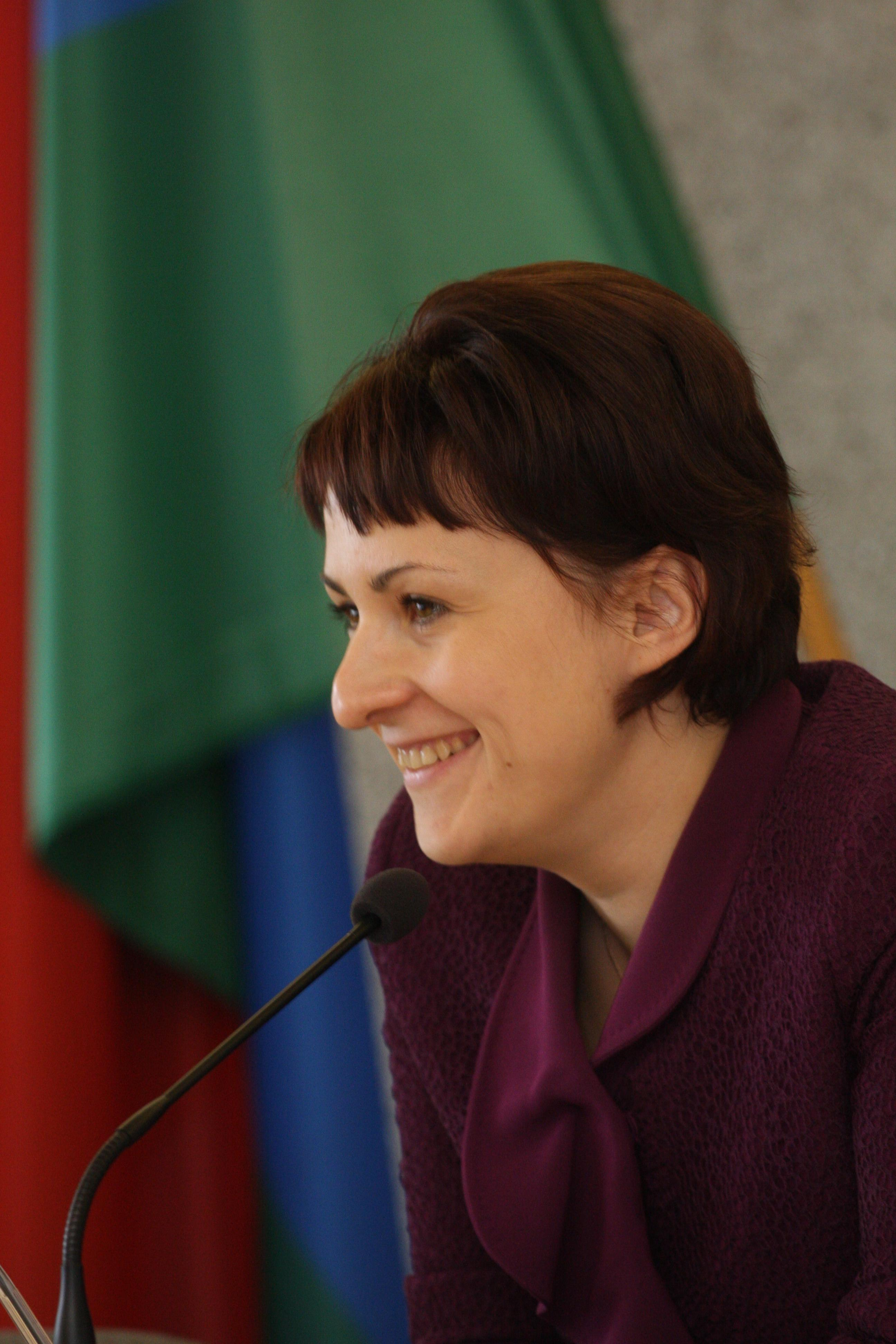

Mayor of Petrozavodsk
- In office September 11, 2013 – December 25, 2015
- Preceded by: Nikolai Levin
- Succeeded by: Irina Miroshnik

Personal details
- Born: May 12, 1979 (age 46) Alakurtti, Murmansk Oblast, Soviet Union
- Party: Yabloko
- Profession: Psychologist, teacher

Galina Igorevna Shirshina (Russian: Галина Игоревна Ширшина) was the mayor of Petrozavodsk, Republic of Karelia, Russia.

Shirshina was born on May 12, 1979, in the village Alakurtti of Murmansk region. Her family moved to Petrozavodsk in 1984.

Galina Shirshina was mayor of Petrozavodsk between September 2013 and December 2015. Shirshina was originally a self-nominated candidate at the mayoral election. She was later supported by the opposition party Yabloko after the registration of their own candidate Emilia Slabunova was cancelled. Shirshina's electoral victory was considered as a major victory of Russian Democratic opposition. However, in her role as mayor she thought of herself more as a civil servant who should be outside politics.

In December 2015, members of the Petrozavodsk City Council dismissed the mayor Galina Shirshina “for failure to perform their duties.” Alexander Khudilaynen, the Head of the Republic of Karelia, supported resignation of the mayor. In January 2016 the news told that Shirshina is going to sue Petrozavodsk's legislature for dismissal.

== Career ==
Shirshina has been working at the student organization of University as well as on the Inter-Faculty Department of Psychology.

For few years Shirshina chaired the department of educational psychology. Before that she has been teaching psychology at the university.

Before the Petrozavodsk mayoral election in 2013 Shirshina worked as a director of the local publishing house.
