= Viktor Stepanov =

Viktor Stepanov may refer to:

- Viktor Stepanov (actor)
- Viktor Stepanov (politician)
