= Nelidov =

Nelidov (masculine, Russian: Нелидов) or Nelidova (feminine, Russian: Нелидова) is a Russian surname. Notable people with the surname include:

- Aleksandr Nelidov (1838–1910), Russian diplomat
- Andrey Nelidov (born 1957), Russian politician
