= Nikolay Rybakov =

Russian politician (born 1978)

- Николай Рыбаков
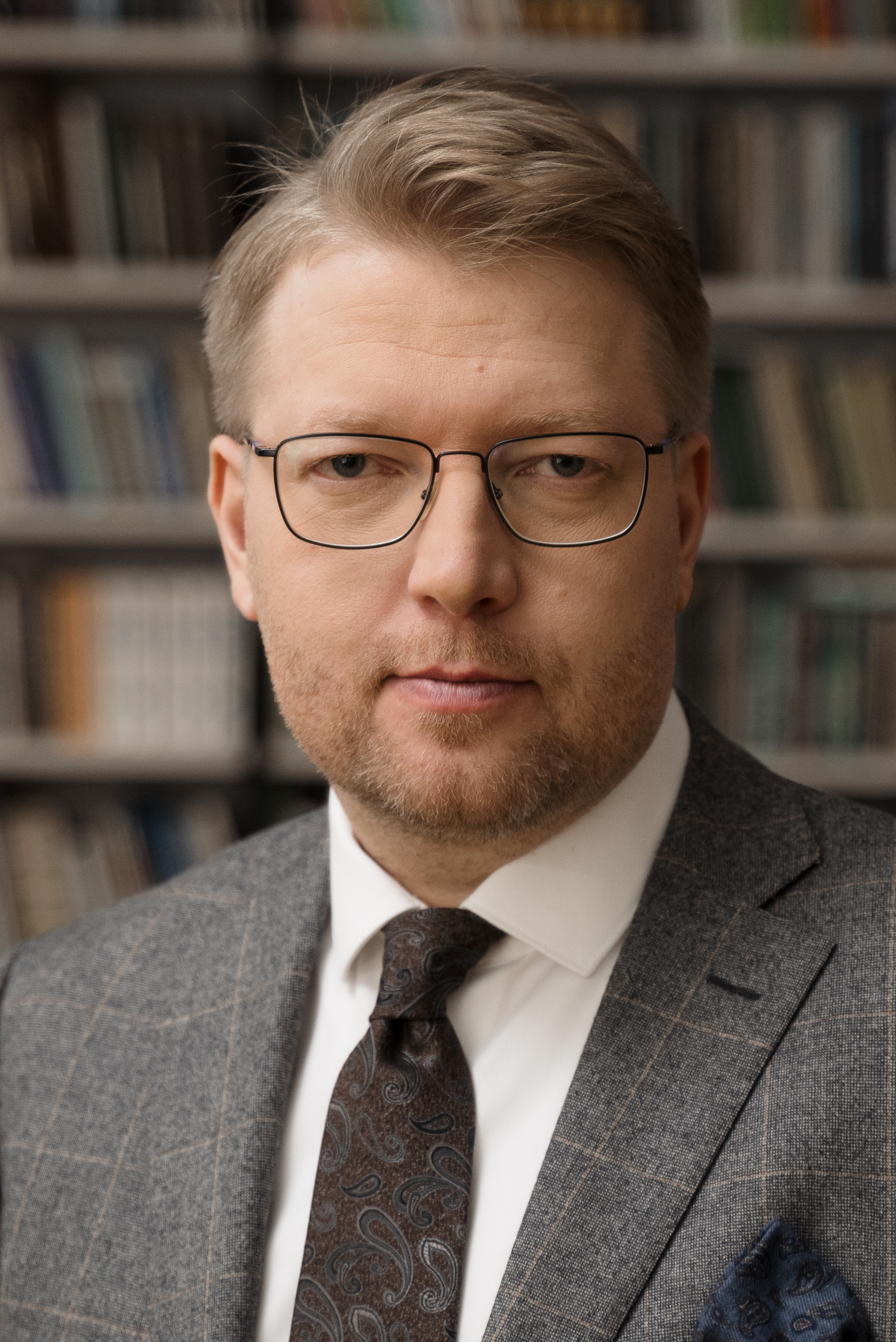
- Official portrait, 2021

Chairman of the Russian United Democratic Party "Yabloko"
- Incumbent
- Assumed office 15 December 2019
- Preceded by: Emilia Slabunova

Personal details
- Born: December 24, 1978 (age 47) Leningrad, Russian SFSR, Soviet Union (present-day Saint Petersburg, Russia)
- Party: Yabloko
- Education: St. Petersburg State Transport University
- Occupation: Public and political figure, environmental activist

Nikolay Igorevich Rybakov (Russian: Николай Игоревич Рыбаков; born 24 December 1978) is a Russian public and political figure, leader of the Russian United Democratic Party "Yabloko" since 2019, executive director of the Bellona – St. Petersburg (2008–2015), and board member of Transparency International Russia (since 2011).

== Professional career ==
Born in Leningrad (present-day Saint Petersburg) on 24 December 1978, within the Russian SFSR of the Soviet Union. Rybakov graduated from the St. Petersburg State Transport University, the academic department of Economics of the Construction Industry. Rybakov started his career at the age of 13 working in a farm in the Priozersk region, later - in the construction cooperative "Sodruzhestvo".

From 1997 to 2000 he worked as an assistant to the deputy of the Legislative Assembly of St. Petersburg Mikhail Amosov.

From 2000 to 2001 he worked as a chief specialist at the EPIcenter St. Petersburg Foundation for Economic and Political Research (headed by Igor Artemyev, now an assistant to the Chairman of the Government of the Russian Federation). At the Foundation, Rybakov was in charge of issues of youth policy and education.

In 2000 Rybakov was elected a deputy of the Municipal Formation "Svetlanovskoye" of St. Petersburg. In the municipality he became the chairman of the commission on budget, finance and property. In 2004 he was elected a deputy of the Municipal Council "Grazhdanka" (St. Petersburg). In the council Rybakov became the chairman of the commission on budgetary, legal and information issues. He also was a member of the editorial board of the newspaper "Municipalnaya Grazhdanka".

In 2006 he was elected head of the Local Administration of the Municipal Formation "Grazhdanka" (St. Petersburg). As head of administration, Rybakov was engaged not only in solving economic issues, but also carried out educational work. The municipality has repeatedly won various urban landscaping competitions. In 2008 he was removed from office. According to another version, Rybakov lost his post as head of the administration because he initiated an investigation, as a result of which the municipalities discovered violations in the organization of conscription.

From 2008 to 2015, Rybakov worked as executive director of the Bellona Environmental Human Rights Center. From 2010 to 2015, he was the editor-in-chief of the Bellona.ru. From 2014 to 2015, Rybakov was the editor-in-chief of the journal "Ecology and Law".

== Political activity ==
Rybakov joined the youth wing of the Russian United Democratic Party Yabloko in 1995 at the age of 16. In 1999–2000, he was the chair of the youth wing. In 2005, he was elected to the Bureau of the Saint Petersburg branch of the party. From 2005 to 2009, he was an editor of the party bulletin Democrat. Since 2008, he has been a member of the party's national Bureau. In 2015 he ran for the chair position in the party but did not win and became a vice-chair, while Emilia Slabunova became a chair.

Rybakov was one of the organizers of the protests against the construction of Gazprom's planned headquarters, the 400 meter Okhta Center skyscraper, which would have towered over Saint Petersburg's historic centre (a World Heritage Site). Rybakov had filed a complaint in court against the city government order to allow construction of the 400-meter-high office for Gazprom on the border of the historical centre. The court adjudicated, but the Saint Petersburg government abolished the order after a public outcry.

Nikolay Rybakov is one of the authors of the movie about crimes during the second Chechen war «Aldy. No limitation period» (in Russian – «Алды. Без срока давности») together with Ekaterina Sokirianskaia from Memorial (society) and Elena Vilenskaya («House of peace and non-violence»). The journalist and human rights activist Natalya Estemirova, assassinated in 2009, and an actor Alexei Devotchenko were contributing to the movie.

He has participated in all party election campaigns in St. Petersburg since 1995. He started working as an agitator and distributor of party materials. In 1998, he headed the headquarters of the election campaign for the election of Mikhail Amosov to the Legislative Assembly of St. Petersburg (won in the first round, having received more than 55% of the vote).

In 1999, he was one of the chiefs of the headquarters for the election of Sergei Stepashin to the State Duma, who ran as a candidate from the Yabloko party in one of the districts in St. Petersburg. As a result of the elections, Sergei Stepashin, gaining 49% of the votes, won the electoral district of Gennady Seleznev, who at that time was the chairman of the State Duma.

In 2000 he was firstly elected a member of the Political Council of the St. Petersburg branch of the Yabloko party and the head of the Vyborg regional organization of the party.

From 2002 to 2003, he was assistant to the deputy of the Yabloko faction in the State Duma of the Russian Federation Sergei Mitrokhin.

In October 2005, he was elected a member of the bureau of the regional council of the St. Petersburg branch of the Yabloko party.

From 2005 to 2009 he was the editor of the party edition - the bulletin "Demokrat".

Since 2008, he is a member of the federal bureau of the Yabloko party.

In 2009, he became Deputy Chairman of the St. Petersburg branch of the Yabloko party.

In 2011, he headed the election headquarters of the Yabloko party for elections to the Legislative Assembly of St. Petersburg and the headquarters for elections to the State Duma in St. Petersburg. The party officially received 12.73% of the vote (236,632 votes), according to exit pools, up to 18.9% of the vote.

In 2012, Rybakov was working as head of the headquarters for the election of Grigory Yavlinsky for the post of President of Russia in St. Petersburg.

In 2012-2014 he represented the party in the coalition "Democratic Petersburg".

In 2015, he ran for the post of chairman of the Yabloko party, but was not elected.

In 2019 Rybakov was elected as chairman of the Yabloko party. He won the first round, gaining 69 votes from the delegates to the congress (the head of the Pskov Yabloko Lev Shlosberg received 40 votes, the current party chairman, deputy of the Legislative Assembly of the Republic of Karelia Emilia Slabunova - 19 votes).

Since 2020, Rybakov is a member of the Public Constitutional Council created to develop alternative amendments to the Constitution of the Russian Federation.

On March 5, 2020, he applied to the Supreme Court of the Russian Federation with an administrative claim, in which he challenged the order of President Vladimir Putin on organizing an all-Russian vote on amendments to the Constitution.

In 2020, Rybakov and Yabloko's deputy chairman Ivan Bolshakov initiated a reform of the party, which allows democratization of party life and the involvement of party members in the decision-making process. During the second stage of the XXI Party Congress, amendments to the Party Charter were adopted. Also, the majority of delegates expressed their confidence in Nikolai Rybakov.

== Participation in elections ==
In March 2000, at the age of 21, he was elected in the municipal council of the municipality Svetlanovskoe with the most votes among all candidates in all municipalities in Saint Petersburg. At the polling station closest to the home address of Rybakov he received 54% of votes. In December 2002, he was running for the Legislative Assembly of Saint Petersburg in Vyborgsky district under the block the SPS+Yabloko and came on the second place.

In March 2004, he was elected in the Municipal council of the municipality Grazhdanka (Kalininsky district, Saint Petersburg). Until December 2004, he combined council work in two municipalities. On the elections in municipality Svetlanovskoe on 19 December 2004, he received 75% of votes. However, as a result of ballot stuffing in favor of the United Russia candidates, he was not acknowledged as an elected candidate. The procurator of Saint Petersburg initiated proceedings on electoral fraud but the investigation was not conducted properly and was closed.

Rybakov was a candidate to the Legislative Assembly of Saint Petersburg in 2007 (Yabloko list was removed from elections due to its active position against the construction of Okhta-Center) and in 2011 (Yabloko officially received 12.5% of votes). He has participated in national elections as a candidate on the party list in 2007 and 2011.

On the Yabloko General Assembly on 1–3 July 2016, he was placed in the party list for the 2016 Russian legislative election on the seventh place in the national part of the list (10 candidates). Also he was running for office in Central Saint Petersburg single-member constituency No.216. According to official data, Rybakov received 13.98% of votes in the constituency (18974 votes, 4th place). The Yabloko list received less than 5% (1,99 %, 1 051 335 votes) and did not get any MPs in the 7th State Duma. Due to a lot of electoral frauds, Yabloko did not acknowledge the results of elections and appealed to court. However, the Supreme Court has denied the claim.

On the regional elections on 18 September 2016, he was the first in the Yabloko list for the Legislative Assembly of Leningrad Region. Yabloko did not get any seats in the Assembly because according to the official data the party got less than 5% of votes (3.71%).

== Social activities ==
In 2005 he became the author of the educational project "Remember Solovki", which is being implemented in educational institutions of St. Petersburg. One of the organizers of mass actions against the construction of the Okhta Center skyscraper in the historic center of St. Petersburg. The author of the idea of the logo “Let's Save the Living Heart of St. Petersburg”. He was one of the applicants in the Smolninsky Court of St. Petersburg in the case of canceling the decision of the Government of St. Petersburg, which was allowed to build a Gazprom office with a height of more than 400 meters on the border of the historic city center. Since 2011, he has been a member of the Human Rights Council of St. Petersburg, and on the same year became a member of the public oversight commission for monitoring the provision of human rights in places of detention and assistance to persons in places of detention [64], member of the Board of the Center for Anti-Corruption Research and Initiatives "Transparency International Russia". In 2013 he became a member of the Advisory Council under the Commissioner for Human Rights in St. Petersburg, as well as Member of the Advisory Council under the Commissioner for Human Rights in St. Petersburg. Jury member of the All-Russian student competition "ECO-LAWYER". From 2016 onwards he participed in Russian political TV shows.

In 2020 and 2021, Rybakov signed personal guarantees for the Ingush activist Zarifa Sautieva, journalist Ivan Safronov, human rights activist Yuri Dmitriev, lawyer Ivan Pavlov.

== As chairman of the party ==
On December 15, 2019, Rybakov was elected chairman of the party. He won in the first round, gaining 69 votes of the congress delegates (the head of the Pskov "Yabloko" Lev Shlosberg won 40 votes, the current party chairman, deputy of the Legislative Assembly of the Republic of Karelia Emilia Slabunova - 19 votes). Some delegates considered the election of Rybakov the result of the work of the administrative resource. According to the deputy of the Moscow City Duma from the Yabloko party, Darya Besedina, the congress was formed in such a way that the majority of the delegates were the current leaders of the party who voted outside the quota, and it was precisely due to this that the least popular in the party, Rybakov, was able to win the election of the chairman from the more popular in the party Lev Shlosberg. An alternative opinion was voiced by the elected deputy chairman of Yabloko, Ivan Bolshakov. He noted that Rybakov is a representative of a new generation, and those who are dissatisfied need to be able to lose.

Since 2020, he has been a member of the Public Constitutional Council, created to develop alternative amendments to the Constitution of Russia.

In 2020, Nikolai Rybakov and Yabloko Deputy Chairman Ivan Bolshakov initiated party reform. During the second stage of the 21st Party Congress, amendments to the charter were adopted. In connection with the appeal of a significant part of the Yabloko members demanding the re-election of the governing bodies, the question of confidence in Rybakov, as the chairman of the party, was also put to the vote. By a majority vote (78 out of 121 delegates), the congress expressed confidence in Rybakov.

After the release of the Kholod material, which reported on the accusations of Alexander Kobrinsky, a member of the Yabloko party, of sexual harassment of female students, and Kobrinsky filed a lawsuit against the publication, Rybakov published an official statement "Principle 'accused means guilty' is unacceptable".

On December 30, 2021, he announced a boycott of the Ekho Moskvy (Echo of Moscow) radio station.

== Position on mass exclusions and party split ==
In connection with the mass deregistrations and exclusions from the Yabloko party in 2021, Rybakov said on Ekho Moskvy that support for Alexei Navalny is incompatible with membership in the Yabloko party, so supporters of Smart Voting will be removed from decision-making.

Regarding the expulsion of 488 people from the Moscow branch, which caused a split, Rybakov stated that these were the consequences of the re-registration procedure, which is a “normal process” that took place in the party “tens and hundreds of times”, noting also the competition of some excluded members with Yabloko in the elections, as well as the inadmissibility of bullying by some party members by others.

During a meeting of the party bureau dealing with expulsions, Rybakov stated that those being expelled had signed "lying" open letters, and that the exclusion was not mass and automatic. One of the excluded members invited to the meeting noted that he was not given the opportunity to familiarize himself with the draft decision on his expulsion, Rybakov responded to such a request with the statement “You cannot ask questions. You can only answer questions."

Speaking about the subsequent split of the party, Rybakov declared the public movement Yabloko "crooks and impostors", and predicted its collapse.

== Criticism ==
On the air of the Morning program of the Ekho Moskvy (Echo of Moscow) radio station on December 8, 2021, Rybakov’s position on the situation with accusations of party member Alexander Kobrinsky of sexual harassment was criticized by the presenters. In particular, it was stated that the leadership of the party, represented by Rybakov, was behaving dishonestly. The hosts criticized Rybakov's support for Kobrinsky in the prosecution of the journalist who published the article.

On December 30, 2021, in the same program, the presenter stated that “the Yabloko party is not talking to us”, that the party announced a boycott of the Ekho Moskvy radio station. Rybakov's commentary is given in the program:

I think you know about the broadcast of Plushev and Felgenhauer, in which it was stated that only dishonorable people remained in the Yabloko party. It was said about Svetlana Gannushkina, Valery Borshchev, Academician Arbatov, Nobel Prize winner Dmitry Muratov. So until the radio station apologizes to my party, I will not comment on anything to you. I hope you understand me. I find it offensive that we were called dishonorable people. And it's up to you to figure it out inside the editorial office. You are one radio station, and therefore you are collectively responsible for how to call these respected people dishonorable. Then solve the problem within your team.

According to the presenters, it was a public denunciation with a list of names and quotes of supposed supporters of Smart Voting, signed by Nikolai Rybakov together with Grigory Yavlinsky, Boris Vishnevsky, Lev Shlosberg and other members of the party bureau. When discussing this episode, the presenters, according to Plushev, uttered the phrase:

If before there were decent people in Yabloko, now, after this, they are gone. Previously, we thought that Yavlinsky was blown away, Rybakov - it’s generally not clear who he is, but there is Vishnevsky, he does it, he’s done well, Shlosberg is well done, he is an internal opposition. But after they all signed it all...

The presenter reproached Rybakov for “hiding behind” Gannushkina and Muratov, who himself, according to the presenter, admitted on the air that he was formally in the party, and did not know about the “denunciation”. The presenter refused to apologize: “if you are decent, you will not compose denunciations”.

== Electoral history ==
2016 Russian legislative election (Central constituency)
Candidate	Party	Votes	%
Vladimir Bortko	Communist Party	34,167	23.88%
Maksim Reznik	Party of Growth	24,062	16.82%
Boris Paykin	Liberal Democratic Party	23,011	16.08%
Nikolay Rybakov	Yabloko	18,974	13.26%
Sergey Popov	A Just Russia	14,473	10.11%
Arkady Chaplygin	People's Freedom Party	4,842	3.38%
Aleksandr Startsev	The Greens	4,832	3.38%
Pavel Spivachevsky	Rodina	4,701	3.29%
Galina Kirichenko	Civic Platform	3,473	2.43%
Vitaly Glavatsky	Communists of Russia	3,183	2.22%
Total		143,097	100%

== Books written ==
- History of the garden near the Silver pond (in Russian);
- The siege of Leningrad. 61 year after (in Russian);
- Remember Solovki. The book of impressions (in Russian);
- History of the Piskaryovski memorial (in Russian);
- How to write an appeal to authorities right (in Russian).
