= Artur Parfenchikov =

Russian politician

- Артур Парфенчиков
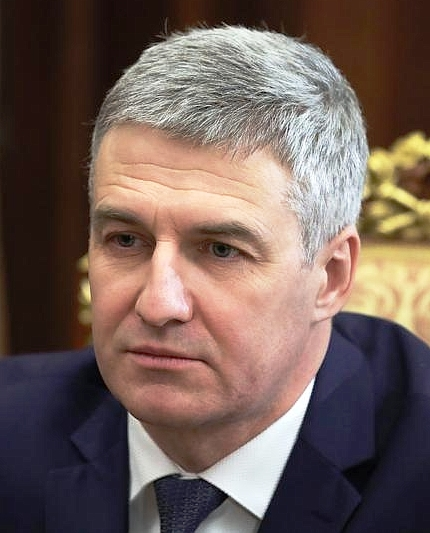
- Parfenchikov in 2017

Head of the Republic of Karelia
- Incumbent
- Assumed office 15 February 2017
- Preceded by: Aleksandr Hudilainen

Director of the Federal Bailiff Service and Chief Bailiff of Russia
- In office 29 December 2008 – 15 February 2017
- Preceded by: Nikolay Vinnichenko
- Succeeded by: Dmitry Aristov

Personal details
- Born: 29 November 1964 (age 61) Petrozavodsk, RSFSR, USSR
- Party: United Russia
- Profession: Lawyer

Artur Olegovich Parfenchikov (Russian: Арту́р Оле́гович Парфе́нчиков; Karelian: Artur Parfenčikov, born 29 November 1964) is a Russian politician and lawyer serving as Head of the Republic of Karelia since February 2017. Parfenchikov was appointed to the post of acting governor after Aleksandr Hudilainen resigned in 2017. He was later confirmed in the position in a general election, where he was a candidate representing the ruling United Russia party. Prior to his appointment as governor, Parfenchikov was the director of the Federal Court Bailiff Service (Chief Bailiff of Russia).

== Biography ==
Born in Petrozavodsk, he spent his childhood in the village of Kirkkoeki, Pitkyarantsky District. In 1982 he graduated from school No. 17 in Petrozavodsk. During his school years, he was fond of speed skating, fulfilled the standard of a candidate for master of sports of the USSR, played for the Dynamo Sports Club.

=== Education ===
In 1987 he graduated from the full-time department of the Law Faculty of Andrei Zhdanov Leningrad State University (now Saint Petersburg State University), where he was classmates with Dmitry Medvedev, Nikolai Vinnichenko, Anton Ivanov, and Konstantin Chuichenko.

=== Career ===
==== Prosecutor's Office of Karelia ====
In 1987–1988, Parfenchikov was a trainee at the Prosecutor's Office of Soviet Karelia. In 1988, he became an assistant to the prosecutor in the Olonetsky District. From 1988 to 1991, he worked as an investigator for the Olonetsky District prosecutor's office. Between 1991 and 1995, he served as deputy prosecutor of the town of Sortavala. During 1995–2000, Parfenchikov held the position of deputy prosecutor of the city of Petrozavodsk. From 2000 to 2006, he served as prosecutor of Petrozavodsk. At that time Parfenchikov advocated for replacing the direct mayoral election in Petrozavodsk with appointment.

==== Bailiff Service ====
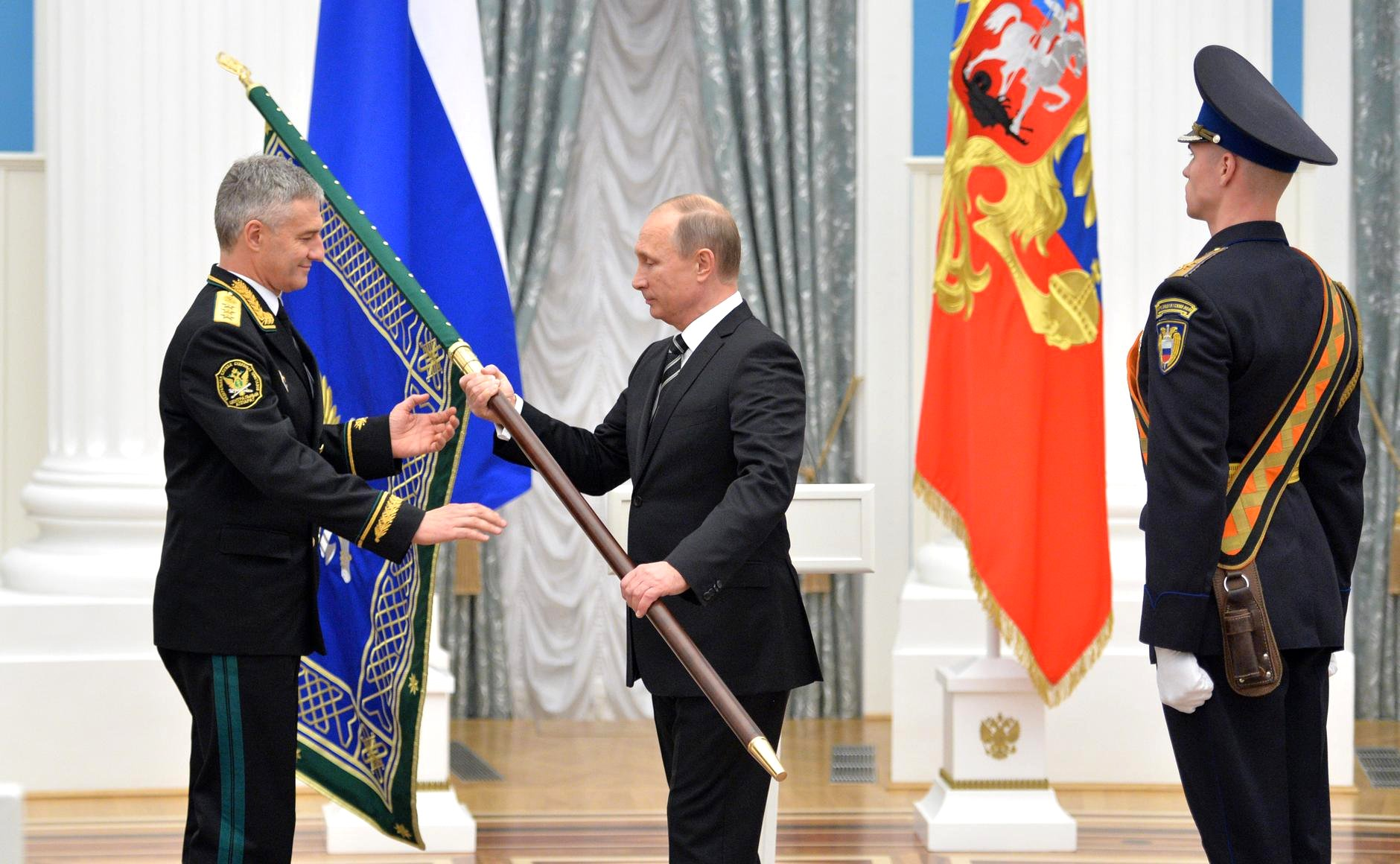
Chief Bailiff Parfenchikov receiving the Federal Bailiff Service banner from President Putin, 2015

In July 2006, Parfenchikov was appointed chief of the Department of the Federal Bailiff Service in Saint Petersburg, becoming the Chief Bailiff of St. Petersburg. In 2007, he was promoted to Deputy Chief Bailiff of Russia, where he oversaw the Directorate for the Organization of Enforcement Proceedings and the Directorate for the Realization of Debtors' Property. From 29 December 2008, to 15 February 2017, he served as Director of the Federal Bailiff Service (Chief Bailiff of the Russian Federation).

==== Head of the Republic of Karelia ====
On 15 February 2017, Parfenchikov was appointed Acting Head of Karelia.

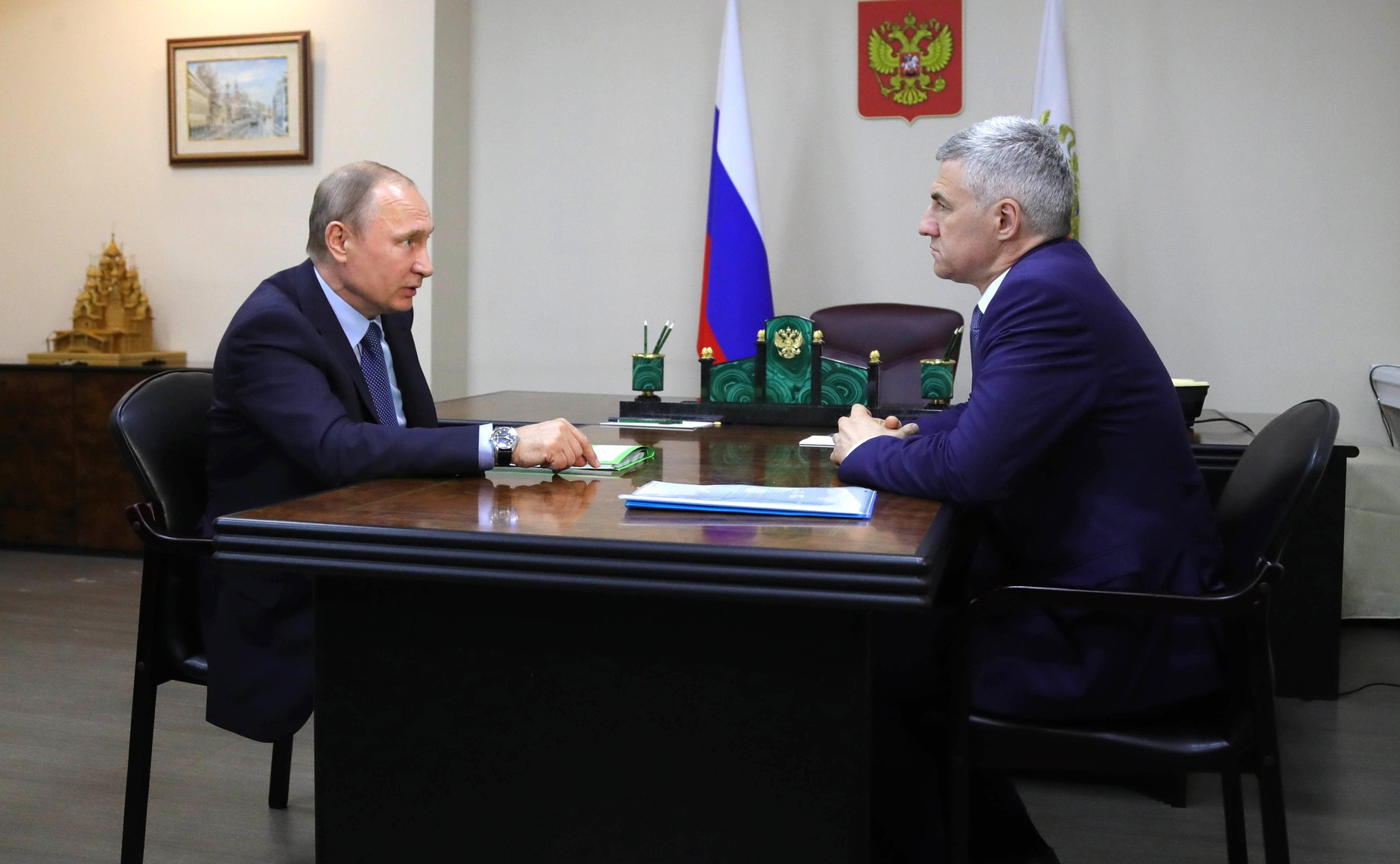
Head Parfenchikov and President Putin, 2017

On 10 September 2017, he won the election of the head of Karelia as a United Russia candidate, gaining 61.34% of the votes.

He assumed the office of Head of the Republic of Karelia on 25 September 2017.

Parfenchikov was reelected as Head of Karelia in 2022, gaining 69.15% of the votes.

== Sanctions ==
On 24 February 2023, the US Department of State added Parfenchikov to its sanctions list in relation to the Russo-Ukrainian war. On 1 April 2023, Parfenchikov was also added to the sanctions list maintained by Ukraine as the head of a government entity that supports, encourages, or publicly approves the policies of the Russian Federation that lead to military operations and the genocide of civilians in Ukraine.

== Awards ==
- Order "For Merit to the Fatherland", 4th class (2020), for significant contribution to the socio-economic development of the Republic of Karelia
- Medal "Glory of Adygea" (2016), for services to strengthening the rule of law and the rule of law
- Order of Merit for the Karachay-Cherkess Republic (2015), for services in ensuring the protection of the rights and legitimate interests of citizens of the Karachay-Cherkess Republic, the rule of law and the constitutional order
- Order of Honour (2012)
- Medal of the Order "For Merit to the Fatherland", 2nd class
- Order of Akhmat Kadyrov (2009), for significant contribution to the development and improvement of the Bailiff Service in the Chechen Republic
- Honoured Lawyer of Russia (2005), for services to strengthening law and order and long-term conscientious service
