= Ural Federal District =

Federal district of Russia

Coordinates: 56°50′N 60°35′E

Ural Federal District Уральский федеральный округ
- Federal district of Russia
- Location of Ural Federal District within Russia
- Interactive map of Ural Federal District
- Country: Russia
- Established: 13 May 2000
- Administrative centre: Yekaterinburg

Government
  - Presidential Envoy: Artem Zhoga

Area
  - Total: 1,818,497 km^{2} (702,126 sq mi)
  - Rank: 3rd

Population (2010)
  - Total: 12,080,526
  - Rank: 6th
  - Density: 6.643138/km^{2} (17.20565/sq mi)
  - Urban: 79.9%
  - Rural: 20.1%

GDP (nominal, 2024)
  - Total: ₽26.64 trillion (2023) (US$312.85 billion)
  - Per capita: ₽2.17 million (US$29,476.77)
- Federal subjects: 6 contained
- Economic regions: 2 contained
- HDI (2022): 0.822 very high · 2nd
- Website: www.uralfo.ru

Ural Federal District (Note: Russian: Уральский федеральный округ, romanized: Ural'skiy federal'nyy okrug, IPA: [ʊˈralʲskʲɪj fʲɪdʲɪˈralʲnɨj ˈokrʊk]) is one of the eight federal districts of Russia. Its population was 12,080,523 (79.9% urban) according to the 2010 census.

Historical population
Year	Pop.	±%
1959	9,112,337	—
1970	6,811,402	−25.3%
1979	10,859,783	+59.4%
1989	12,525,993	+15.3%
2002	12,373,926	−1.2%
2010	12,080,526	−2.4%
2021	12,300,793	+1.8%
Source: Census data

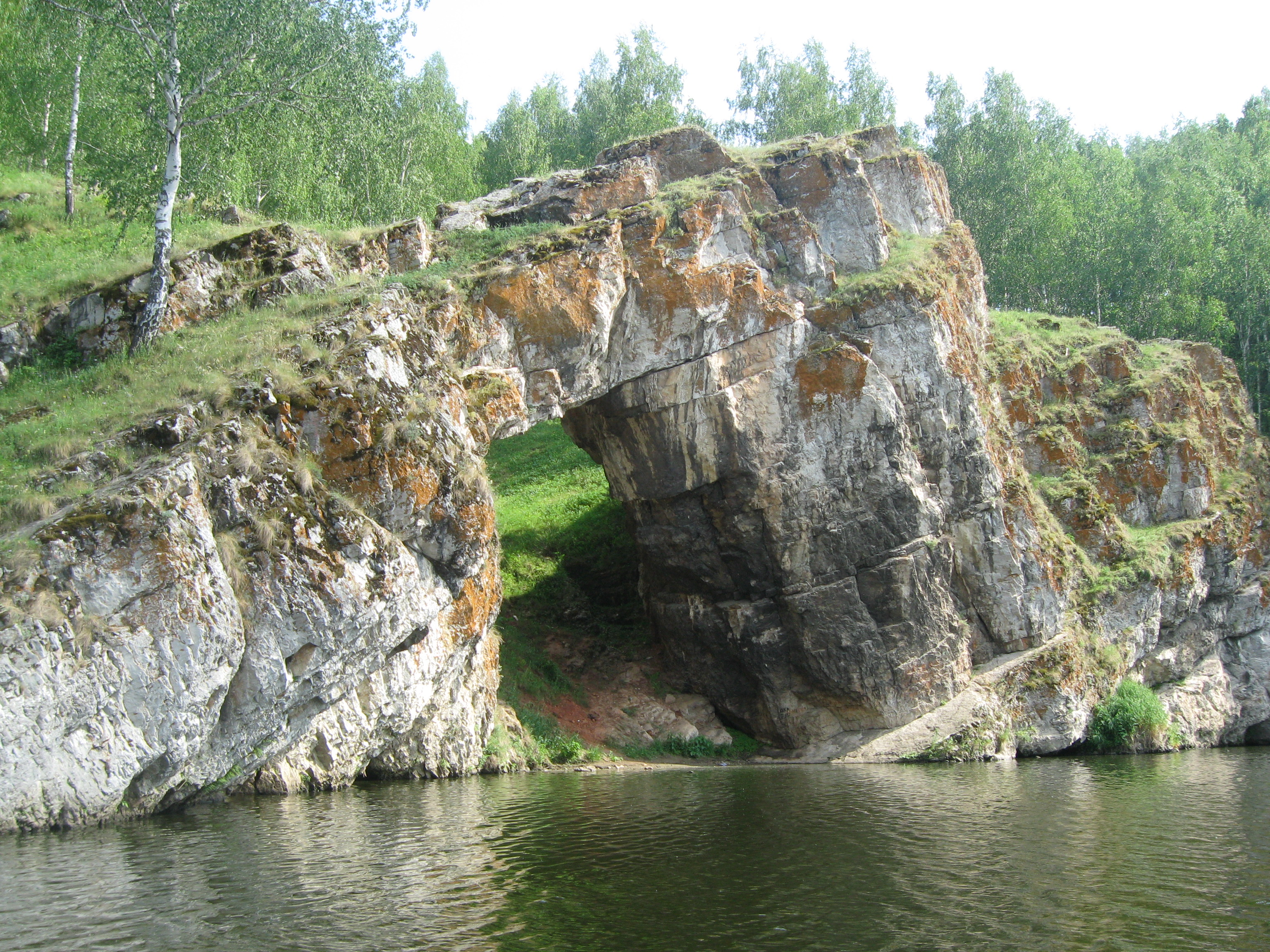
Stone Gate on Iset River, Sverdlovsk oblast

The district was established on 13 May 2000 by a decree of the President of Russia. It is located at the border of the European and Asian parts of Russia. The administrative centre of the district is the city of Yekaterinburg.

The district contributes 18% to Russia's Gross Regional Product (GRP), although its population is only 8.5% of the Russian total.

== General information and statistics ==
Urals Federal District

The district covers an area of 1,818,500 square kilometers (702,100 sq mi), about 10% of Russia. According to the 2010 Census, the district had a population of 12,080,526, of whom 82.74% were Russians (10,237,992 people), 5.14% Tatars (636,454), 2.87% Ukrainians (355,087) and 2.15% Bashkirs (265,586). The remainder comprises various ethnicities of the former Soviet Union. 79.9% of the district's population lived in urban areas.

In 2006, the district provided 90% of Russian natural gas production, 68% of oil and 42% of metal products. Industrial production per capita in the district is about 2.5 times higher than the average value throughout Russia. The district provides about 42% of Russian tax incomes, mostly from industry. Its major branches are fuel mining and production (53%), metallurgy (24%) and metal processing and engineering (8.8%). The latter two are especially developed in Chelyabinsk and Sverdlovsk Oblast which, between them, constitute 83% of Russian metallurgy and 73% of metal processing and engineering. Whereas fuel and mineral mining has been providing a nearly constant outcome between 1990 and 2006, metal processing and engineering are declining, despite the fact that they employ up to 30% of industry workers of the district. Local ore processing plants can provide only 20% of required copper, 28% chromium, 35% iron and 17% coal, and many of these resources are nearly exhausted. Meanwhile, the average distance to import them to the Ural is 2,500 km.

The district is governed by the Presidential Envoy, and individual envoys are assigned by the President of Russia to all the Oblasts of the district. Pyotr Latyshev was envoy to the Urals Federal District until his death on 2 December 2008. Nikolay Vinnichenko succeeded him on this post on 8 December 2008. On 6 September 2011 Vinnichenko was appointed the envoy to the Northwestern Federal District, and Yevgeny Kuyvashev became the Presidential Envoy in the Ural Federal District. On 18 May 2012 Vladimir Putin offered the tenure to Igor Kholmanskikh, an engineer without any previous political experience, and Kholmanskikh accepted the offer. On 26 June 2018, Kholmanskikh was replaced by Nikolay Tsukanov.

=== Federal subjects ===
The district comprises the Central (part) and West Siberian economic regions and six federal subjects:

Federal subjects in the Ural Federal District
#	Flag	Coat of Arms	Federal subject	Administrative center	Area in km^{2}	Population	GDP	Map of Administrative Division
1			Kurgan Oblast	Kurgan	71,000	776,661	₽268 billion	
2			Sverdlovsk Oblast	Yekaterinburg	194,226	4,268,998	₽3,038 billion	
3			Tyumen Oblast	Tyumen	143,520	1,601,940	₽1,536 billion	
4			Khanty-Mansi Autonomous Okrug (Yugra)	Khanty-Mansiysk	534,800	1,711,480	₽5,652 billion	
5			Chelyabinsk Oblast	Chelyabinsk	87,900	3,431,224	₽2,043 billion	
6			Yamalo-Nenets Autonomous Okrug	Salekhard	750,300	510,490	₽4,162 billion	

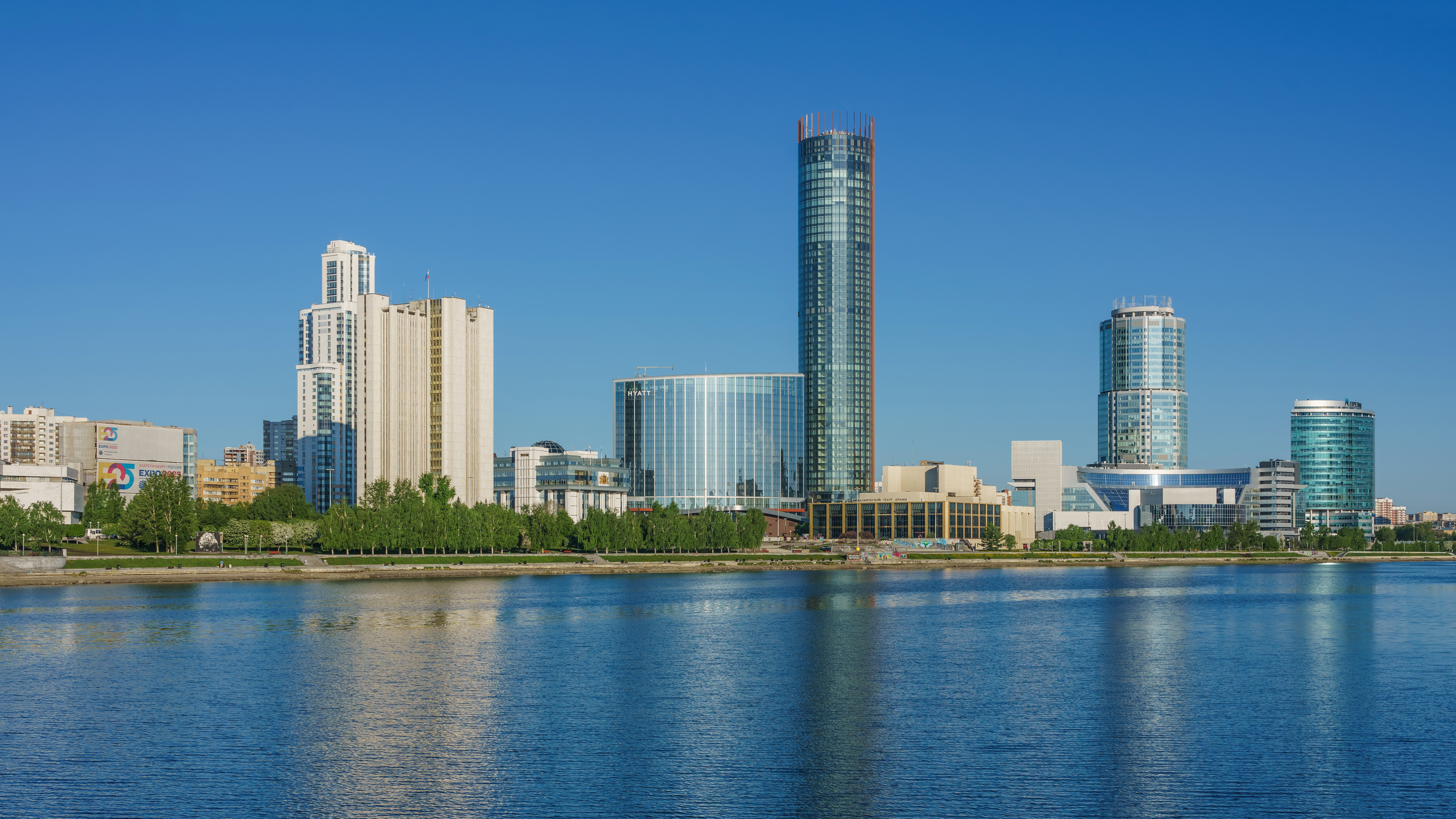
Yekaterinburg

=== Religion ===
Religion in the Ural Federal District as of 2012 (Sreda Arena Atlas)
Russian Orthodoxy	32.7%
Other Orthodox	3.4%
Other Christians	6.9%
Islam	6.0%
Rodnovery and other native faiths	1.1%
Spiritual but not religious	31.2%
Atheism and irreligion	12.8%
Other and undeclared	5.9%

According to a 2012 survey 32.7% of the population of the Ural Federal District adheres to the Russian Orthodox Church, 6.9% are unaffiliated generic Christians, 3.4% is an Eastern Orthodox believer without belonging to any church or adheres to other (non-Russian) Eastern Orthodox churches, 6.0% is an adherent of Islam, and 1.1% adhere to some native faith such as Rodnovery. In addition, 31.2% of the population declares to be "spiritual but not religious", 12.8% is atheist, and 5.9% follows other religions or did not give an answer to the question.

== Presidential plenipotentiary envoys to the Ural Federal District ==
Presidential plenipotentiary envoys to the Ural Federal District
No.	Name (envoy)	Photo	Term of office			Appointed by
No.	Name (envoy)	Photo	Start of term	End of term	Length of service	Appointed by
1	Pyotr Latyshev		18 May 2000	2 December 2008	8 years, 198 days	Vladimir Putin
-	Vladimir Krupkin (acting)		2 December 2008	8 December 2008	6 days	Dmitry Medvedev
2	Nikolay Vinnichenko		8 December 2008	6 September 2011	2 years, 272 days	Dmitry Medvedev
3	Yevgeny Kuyvashev		6 September 2011	14 May 2012	251 days	Dmitry Medvedev
4	Igor Kholmanskikh		18 May 2012	26 June 2018	6 years, 39 days	Vladimir Putin
5	Nikolay Tsukanov		26 June 2018	9 November 2020	2 years, 136 days	Vladimir Putin
6	Vladimir Yakushev		9 November 2020	24 September 2024	3 years, 320 days	Vladimir Putin
7	Artem Zhoga		2 October 2024	present	2 years, 8 days	Vladimir Putin
