= Military ranks, special ranks and class rates in Russia =

This is the full list of ranks and rates used in the Russian Federation.

== Military ranks ==
- Deck ranks are used by:
  - Ministry of Defense
    - Navy — Deck personnel only
  - Federal Security Service (FSB)
    - Russian FSB Coast Guard
  - National Guard (FSVNG)
    - National Guard Naval Service Corps
- Troop ranks are used by:
  - Ministry of Defense
    - Aerospace Forces
      - Air Force
      - Space Forces
      - Aerospace Defense Forces
    - Ground Forces
    - Navy — Naval Infantry, Naval Aviation, Coastal Defense troops, Medical Service, and over-shore services
    - Air-Borne Assault Troops
    - Strategic Rocket Forces
    - Spetsnaz
    - Other services and service support forces directly under the Armed Forces and the Ministry of Defence
  - National Guard (FSVNG)
    - National Guard Forces Command
  - Federal Security Service (FSB)
    - Federal Security Service by itself
    - Border Troops of the FSB
  - Federal Protective Service (FSO)
    - includes the Kremlin Regiment (KP)
  - Foreign Intelligence Service (SVR)
  - Ministry of Emergency Situations (MChS / EMERCOM)
    - Civil Defense troops
    - Military Personnel of the State Firefighting Service
  - Military Prosecution — under the Office of the Prosecutor General of Russia — not under the Ministry of Defense.
  - Military Judges of Military Courts — military courts are part of the Unified Judicial System of Russia and subordinate to the Supreme Court of the Russian Federation (which has a military colleague) — not under the Ministry of Defense; there are also civilian judges in military courts.

Every military service that is not directly maritime (including shore services of the Navy) uses troop ranks.

== Special ranks ==
- Special ranks of Police are used by:
  - Russian Police (under Ministry of Internal Affairs)
  - Main Directorate for Drugs Control (Ministry of Internal Affairs)
- Special ranks of justice are used by:
  - Investigative Committee of Russia (not to be confused with military ranks of military prosecutors and military judges)
- Special ranks of internal service are used by:
  - Federal Migration Service (under Ministry of Internal Affairs)
  - other uniformed services of Ministry of Internal Affairs (passport desks, medical service of ministry, etc.)
  - Federal Prison Service (under Ministry of Justice)
  - Federal Bailiffs Service (under Ministry of Justice)
  - State Firefighting Service (under Ministry of Emergency Situations) (apart from military personnel of the service which use military ranks)
  - State Courier Service (Russia)
- Special rank of customs service
  - Federal Customs Service of Russia

== Class rates ==
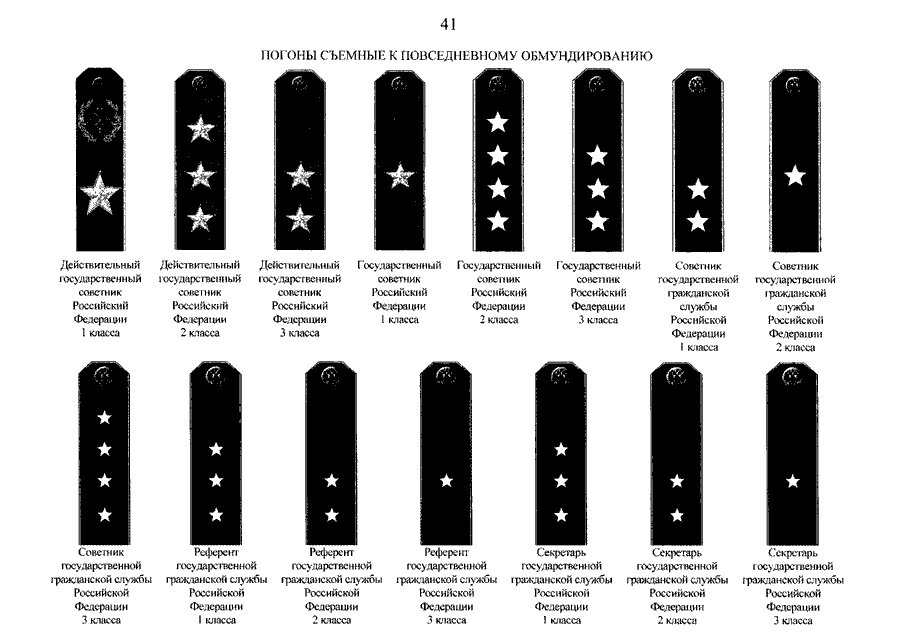
Insignia of class rates for the State Civil Service in the Ministry of Defense.

Class rates are used by different federal ministries and agencies of Russia. Some of them use common State Civil Service class rates while others (like the Ministry of Justice and the State Prosecution Service) use specialized class rates. Some municipal organizations also use class rates.

== Table of ranks ==
| Military ranks | | Special ranks | | | | Class rates | | |
| Troop ranks | Deck ranks | of Police | of Justice | of Internal Service | of Customs Service | State Civil Service | Ministry of Justice | Prosecution Service |
|---|---|---|---|---|---|---|---|---|
| Marshal of the Russian Federation | | — | — | — | — | — | — | — |
| General of the Army | Admiral of the Fleet | General of Police of the Russian Federation | — | — | Actual State Councillor of Customs Service of Russian Federation | — | Actual State Councillor of Justice of Russian Federation | Actual State Councillor of Justice |
| General of the Army | Admiral of the Fleet | General of Police of the Russian Federation | — | — | Actual State Councillor of Customs Service of Russian Federation | Actual State Councillor of Russian Federation, 1st class | Actual State Councillor of Justice of Russian Federation, 1st class | Actual State Councillor of Justice |
| General of the Army | Admiral of the Fleet | General of Police of the Russian Federation | — | — | Actual State Councillor of Customs Service of Russian Federation | Actual State Councillor of Russian Federation, 2nd class | Actual State Councillor of Justice of Russian Federation, 2nd class | Actual State Councillor of Justice |
| General of the Army | Admiral of the Fleet | General of Police of the Russian Federation | — | — | Actual State Councillor of Customs Service of Russian Federation | Actual State Councillor of Russian Federation, 3rd class | Actual State Councillor of Justice of Russian Federation, 3rd class | Actual State Councillor of Justice |
| Colonel General | Admiral | Colonel General of police | Colonel General of justice | Colonel General of internal service | Colonel General of customs service | State Councillor of Russian Federation, 1st class | State Councillor of Justice of Russian Federation, 1st class | State Councillor of Justice, 1st class |
| Lieutenant General | Vice Admiral | Lieutenant General of police | Lieutenant General of justice | Lieutenant General of internal service | Lieutenant General of customs service | State Councillor of Russian Federation, 2nd class | State Councillor of Justice of Russian Federation, 2nd class | State Councillor of Justice, 2nd class |
| Major General | Rear Admiral | Major General of police | Major General of justice | Major General of internal service | Major General of customs service | State Councillor of Russian Federation, 3rd class | State Councillor of Justice of Russian Federation, 3rd class | State Councillor of Justice, 3rd class |
| Colonel | Captain, 1st rank | Colonel of police | Colonel of justice | Colonel of internal service | Colonel of customs service | Councillor of State Civil Service of Russian Federation, 1st class | Councillor of Justice, 1st class | Senior Councillor of Justice |
| Lieutenant Colonel | Captain, 2nd rank | Lieutenant Colonel of police | Lieutenant Colonel of justice | Lieutenant Colonel of internal service | Lieutenant Colonel of customs service | Councillor of State Civil Service of Russian Federation, 2nd class | Councillor of Justice, 2nd class | Councillor of Justice |
| Major | Captain, 3rd rank | Major of police | Major of justice | Major of internal service | Major of customs service | Councillor of State Civil Service of Russian Federation, 3rd class | Councillor of Justice, 3rd class | Junior Councillor of Justice |
| Captain | Captain Lieutenant | Captain of police | Captain of justice | Captain of internal service | Captain of customs service | Referent of State Civil Service of Russian Federation, 1st class | Jurist, 1st class | Jurist, 1st class |
| Senior Lieutenant | Senior Lieutenant | Senior Lieutenant of police | Senior Lieutenant of justice | Senior Lieutenant of internal service | Senior Lieutenant of customs service | Referent of State Civil Service of Russian Federation, 2nd class | Jurist, 2nd class | Jurist, 2nd class |
| Lieutenant | Lieutenant | Lieutenant of police | Lieutenant of justice | Lieutenant of internal service | Lieutenant of customs service | Referent of State Civil Service of Russian Federation, 3rd class | Jurist, 3rd class | Jurist, 3rd class |
| Junior Lieutenant | Junior Lieutenant | Junior Lieutenant of police | Junior Lieutenant of justice | Junior Lieutenant of internal service | Junior Lieutenant of customs service | Secretary of State Civil Service of Russian Federation, 1st class | — | Junior Jurist |
| Senior Praporshchik | Senior Michman | Senior Praporshchik of police | Senior Praporshchik of justice | Senior Praporshchik of internal service | Senior Praporshchik of customs service | Secretary of State Civil Service of Russian Federation, 2nd class | — | — |
| Praporshchik | Michman | Praporshchik of police | Praporshchik of justice | Praporshchik of internal service | Praporshchik of customs service | Secretary of State Civil Service of Russian Federation, 3rd class | — | — |
| Starshina | Chief Ship Starshina | Starshina of police | Starshina of justice | Starshina of internal service | — | — | — | — |
| Senior Sergeant | Chief Starshina | Senior Sergeant of police | Senior Sergeant of justice | Senior Sergeant of internal service | — | — | — | — |
| Sergeant | Starshina 1st Class | Sergeant of police | Sergeant of justice | Sergeant of internal service | — | — | — | — |
| Junior Sergeant | Starshina 2nd class | Junior Sergeant of police | Junior Sergeant of justice | Junior Sergeant of internal service | — | — | — | — |
| Yefreitor | Senior Seaman | — | — | — | — | — | — | — |
| Private | Seaman | Private of police | Private of justice | Private of internal service | — | — | — | — |

== Sources ==
- Федеральный закон "О воинской обязанности и военной службе" от 28.03.1998 N 53-ФЗ 2013-11-03
- Указ Президента РФ от 7 июня 2011 г. N 720 "О внесении изменений в некоторые акты Президента Российской Федерации" 2013-11-03

== See also ==
- History of Russian military ranks
