= Ekaterina Sokirianskaia =

Russian Human Rights researcher, professor of political science

- Екатерина Сокирянская
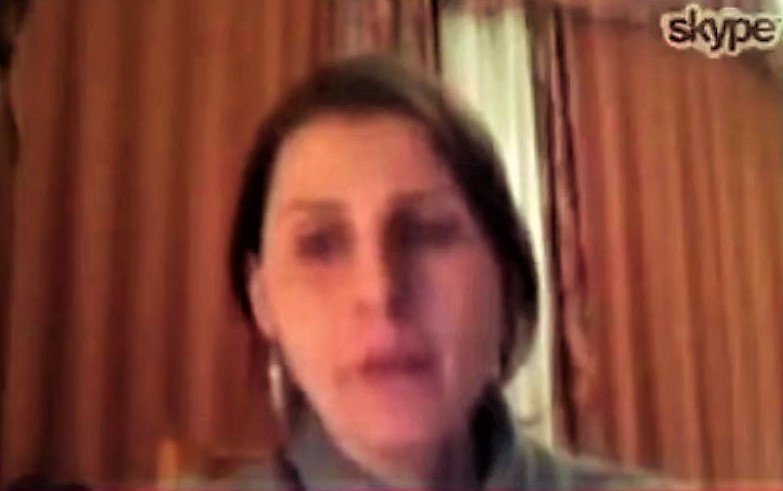
- Ekaterina Sokirianskaia, researcher from the Memorial Human Rights Watchdog (Russia), political scientist, in interview for Voice of America. March 21, 2016 (Screenshot)
- Born: Екатерина Леонидовна Сокирянская; December 19, 1975; Leningrad
- Scientific career
- Fields: Human Rights
- Institutions: Russian Human Rights Center "Memorial"

Ekaterina Sokirianskaia (Russian: Екатерина Леонидовна Сокирянская; December 19, 1975) is a Russian human rights researcher, journalist, writer, professor of political science. Her researches dedicated mostly to the region of North Caucasus, where she worked at "Memorial", non-governmental human rights center from 2003 to 2008 as researcher, and at the Grozny University, where she taught political science.

== Biography ==
=== Birth place ===
Ekaterina Sokirianskaia was born in the City of Leningrad (present day, Saint Petersburg) on December 19, 1975.

=== Education ===
Studied in Foreign Languages Faculty at Herzen University, Philosophy and Political Science Faculty at the Saint Petersburg State University, had Russian degree of Candidate of Sciences for research "Methodology and techniques of negotiation in resolving ethnopolitical conflicts" (2002). She has Doctor of Philosophy degree in political science from Central European University, Budapest.

=== Career ===
Ekaterina Sokirianskaia lived 17 years in North Caucasus, researching political situation. From 2003 to 2008, Sokirianskaia was a team of the Memorial Center in Ingushetia and Chechnya, monitoring and researching human rights conditions and during war conflicts as well as Ossetian–Ingush Conflict, her projects were "Database of missing residents of the Chechen Republic" and "Countering falsification of criminal cases in the framework of counter-terrorism operations in the North Caucasus". From 2004 to 2006 she taught in the History Faculty of the Grozny State University. From 2008 to 2011, she was program curator at the Memorial Centers in Kabardino-Balkaria and Dagestan, researching situation with human rights violations, work at settlement of new offices of the Memorial in Nalchik and Makhachkala.

Ekaterina Sokirianskaia was a spokeswoman of International Crisis Group in Russia since November 2011. She cooperated with the Expert Council under the Commissioner for Human Rights in the Russian Federation as an expert (about 2007).

== Publications (selective, not complete list) ==
- Sokirianskaia, E. 2005, Forced migration in the Northern Caucasus: involving local stakeholders in the process of returning Ingush IDPs (Policy Analyses) (p. 19). Budapest: Central european university, center for policy studies; Open society institute
- Sokirianskaia, E. 2006, Modern nation-building in the northern caucasus : Ingushetia 1992-2004. In W. J. Burszta & T. Kamusella (Eds.), Nationalisms across the globe: an overview of nationalisms in state-endowed and stateless nations. The world. Vol. 2 (p. 469). Poznań: School of Humanities and Journalism.
- Sokirianskaia, E., 2006, Getting Back Home? Towards Sustainable Return of Ingush Forced Migrants and Lasting Peace in Prigorodny District of North Ossetia (Policy Analyses) (p. 49). Budapest: Central european university, center for policy studies; Open society institute
- Sokirianskaia, E. 2010, Governing Fragmented Societies: State-Building and Political Integration in Chechnya and Ingushetia (1991-2009). Central Europe University, Budapest
- Sokirianskaia, E. 2010, Ideology and Conflict: Chechen Political Nationalism Prior to and During, Ten Years of War. In M. Gammer (Ed.), Ethno-nationalism, Islam and the state in the Caucasus : post-Soviet disorder (pp. 102–138). London: Routledge
- Sokirianskaia, E. 2013, December 5, Winter Games, Caucasian Misery. New York Times
- Sokirianskaia, E. 2013, December 7, A Chill Wind in the Caucasus. New York Times, p. A21
- Sokirianskaia, E. 2014, State and Violence in Chechnya (1997–1999). In A. Regamey, E. Sieca-Kozlowski, & A. Le Huérou (Eds.), Chechnya at War and Beyond (pp. 93–117). New York: Routledge/Taylor & Francis
- Sokirianskaia, E. 2015, To the Islamic State and Back. Crisis Group
- Sokirianskaia, E. 2016, Russia’s North Caucasus Insurgency Widens as ISIS’ Foothold Grows. World Politics Review
- Sokirianskaia, E. 2017, March 22, Vladimir Putin has one reliable set of allies: Russia’s iron ladies. Guardian
- Sokirianskaia, E. 2017, May 3, Chechnya’s Anti-Gay Pogrom. New York Times
- Sokirianskaia, E. 2017, August 1, Is Chechnya Taking Over Russia? International New York Times
