= Nikolay Vinnichenko =

Russian lawyer and politician (born 1965

- Николай Винниченко
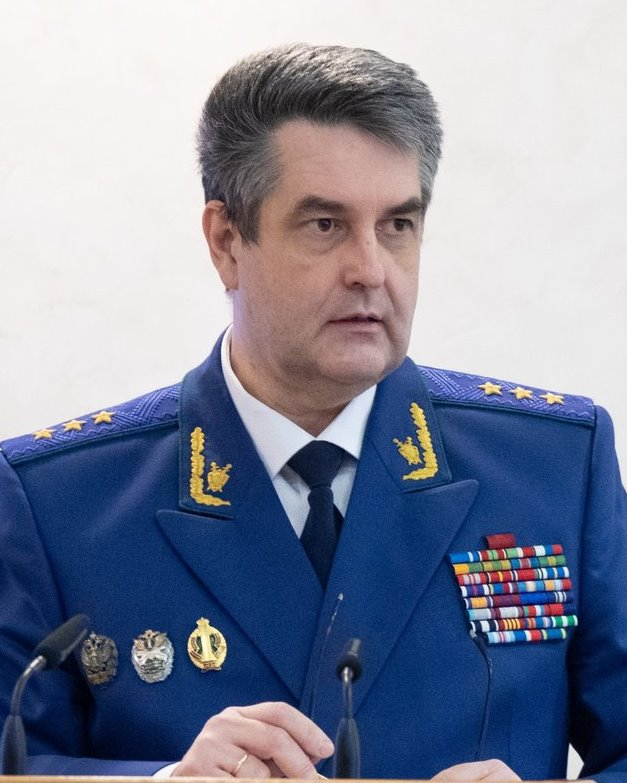
- Vinnichenko in 2020

Deputy Prosecutor-General of Russia
- Incumbent
- Assumed office 27 March 2013
- Prosecutor-General: Yury Chaika; Igor Krasnov

4th Russian Presidential Envoy to the Northwestern Federal District
- In office 6 September 2011 – 11 March 2013
- President: Dmitry Medvedev; Vladimir Putin
- Preceded by: Ilya Klebanov
- Succeeded by: Vladimir Bulavin

2nd Russian Presidential Envoy to the Urals Federal District
- In office 8 December 2008 – 6 September 2011
- President: Dmitry Medvedev
- Preceded by: Pyotr Latyshev
- Succeeded by: Yevgeny Kuyvashev

Director of the Federal Bailiff Service and Chief Bailiff of Russia
- In office 21 October 2004 – 8 December 2008
- President: Vladimir Putin; Dmitry Medvedev
- Preceded by: Office established
- Succeeded by: Artur Parfenchikov

Personal details
- Born: 10 April 1965 (age 61) Oktyabrskoye village, Shemonaikha District, East Kazakhstan Province, Kazakh SSR, USSR

Nikolay Alexandrovich Vinnichenko (Russian: Николай Александрович Винничéнко, born 10 April 1965) is a Russian lawyer and politician. He has the federal state civilian service rank of 1st class Active State Councillor of the Russian Federation.

== Biography ==
Nikolay Vinnichenko graduated from the Saint Petersburg State University Faculty of Law in 1987.

He started his career as a trainee for the Prosecutor of Saint Petersburg, and became his assistant in 1990. In 1995, he became public prosecutor of Saint Petersburg, and Deputy public prosecutor of the city in 1999. In 2001, he was named Federal inspector in-chief of Saint Petersburg. From 9 April 2003, until 12 September 2004, he was the Chief Prosecutor of Saint Petersburg. From 21 October 2004, he had been the Chief Bailiff, Director of the Federal Bailiff Service of Russia.

On 8 December 2008, Vinnichenko was appointed to be the Russian Presidential Envoy to the Urals Federal District. Since 6 September 2011, he is the Russian Presidential Envoy to the Northwestern Federal District.

Since 2013, Nikolay Vinnichenko is Deputy Prosecutor General of the Russian Federation.

In the aftermath of the Malaysia Airlines Flight 17 crash, Nikolay Vinnichenko declared, as Deputy Prosecutor General, that Russia had sent to the Dutch-led Joint Investigation Team (JIT) the proof that the missile that caused the crash was a Ukrainian one, and that this information had not been taken into consideration by the JIT.

Nikolay Vinnichenko sanctioned the extradition of the Belarusian refugee Andrey Kazimirov, who was seeking asylum in Russia after being tortured by the police for two days in the aftermath of the Belarus election protests.

== Other roles ==
- Member of the State Border Commission

== Honours and awards ==
- Order of Honour
- Medal "In Commemoration of the 300th Anniversary of Saint Petersburg"
- Medal "In Commemoration of the 1000th Anniversary of Kazan"

Political offices
Preceded by Ivan Sydoruk	Chief Prosecutor of Saint Petersburg; April 9, 2003, - September 12, 2004	Succeeded by Sergei Zaytsev
Preceded by Arkady Melnikov	Chief Bailiff of Russia; October 21, 2004–present	Incumbent
