= Viktor Stepanov (politician) =

Russian politician (born 1947)

- Виктор Степанов
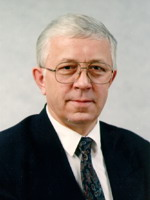

Member of the Legislative Assembly of Karelia
- In office 8 October 2006 – 19 September 2021
- Parliamentary group: A Just Russia

Russian Federation Senator from the Republic of Karelia
- In office 14 December 2001 – 7 April 2006
- Preceded by: Sergey Katanandov
- Succeeded by: Andrey Nelidov

Prime Minister of Karelia
- In office 17 May 1994 – 1 June 1998
- Preceded by: Sergey Blinnikov
- Succeeded by: Sergey Katanandov

Chairman of the Supreme Soviet of Karelia
- In office 18 April 1990 – 17 May 1994

Personal details
- Born: January 27, 1947 (age 79) Vidlitsa, Olonetsky District, Karelo-Finnish SSR, Soviet Union

Viktor Nikolayevich Stepanov (Russian: Виктор Николаевич Степанов, Karelian: Viktor Nikolaevič Stepanov; born 27 January 1947) is a Russian politician who was the prime minister of the Republic of Karelia in 1994–98.

== Biography ==
Viktor Stepanov was born in 1947 in the village of Vidlitsa, Olonetsky District to a Karelian family. From 1964 to 1968 he was a carpenter at the Vidlinsky production site of the Ilyinsky sawmill.

=== Party career ===
Since 1968, the head of the organizational department, from 1970 to 1973 - the second, then the first secretary of the Olonetsky District Komsomol Committee. Since 1973 - an instructor, since 1974 - the head of the department, since 1976 - the second secretary of the Karelian regional committee of the Komsomol. Since 1980 - instructor of the Karelian regional committee of the CPSU. From 1980 to 1982 Stepanov was the second secretary of the Olonetsky district party committee, in 1982–84 he was the first secretary of the Pryazhinsky District committee. Since 1988, he worked in the apparatus of the Central Committee of the CPSU as an instructor in the department of interethnic relations.

=== Head of Karelia ===
In December 1989, at the extraordinary session of the 11th Supreme Council of Karelia, Stepanov was elected chairman of the Presidium of the Supreme Council. In April 1990 he became chairman of the Supreme Council. Also he was elected a people's deputy of Russia. In the Soviet of Nationalities he was a member of the commission on interethnic relations, coordinator of "Sovereignty and Equality" group, a member of the "Communists of Russia" faction.

In September 1990, he was elected a member of the Politburo of the Central Committee of the newly formed Communist Party of the RSFSR.

During the August putsch of 1991, despite the mass rallies taking place in Petrozavodsk and the active pro-Yeltsinist position of the city council, the republican authorities refused to give any comments about what was happening in Moscow, citing the alleged lack of reliable information. The official decree condemning the actions of the GKChP was adopted only after the Russian parliament announced the failure of the coup.

On 22 September 1993, during the constitutional crisis in Russia, the Stepanov-led Supreme Council of Karelia supported the decision of the Congress of People's Deputies to impeach president Boris Yeltsin. Later the Council declared presidential decrees invalid on the territory of Karelia. On September 30, Stepanov left for Moscow to attend a meeting of representatives of the regions to discuss ways out of the crisis. The decision of the parliament, caused sharp reprimand from the executive branch, in particular the head of the Council of Ministers Sergey Blinnikov and Petrozavodsk mayor Sergey Katanandov. The conflict between the branches of government was resolved soon after clashes in the capital came to an end.

Stepanov took part in the election to the newly established upper house of Russia, the Federation Council, which took place on 12 December 1993. Together with Sergey Blinnikov, Stepanov was elected from the Karelian 2-member district. On 17 April 1994 Stepanov won the prime ministerial election with 68.6% of the votes, being the only candidate (Blinnikov withdrew his candidacy).

Since 1994, Karelia has been an active participant of the Barents Euro-Arctic projects, in 1995 it joined the cooperation through the Council of the Baltic Sea States. Notable international projects of the Stepanov administration were the Atlantic-Karelia and Arkhangelsk development corridors.

From January 1996, he was ex officio a member of the second Federation Council, and was deputy chairman of the committee for the CIS affairs.

While being governor, Stepanov retained his membership in the Union of Communists of Karelia, the largest leftist faction of those years in the region, in 1997 transformed into a regional branch of the Communist Party. Avoiding a confrontation with the Kremlin, he avoided active cooperation with the left and contributed to the formation of the ruling party “Our Home – Russia” in Karelia.

In 1997, Stepanov's government has been sharply criticized after the new owner of the Segezha Pulp and Paper Mill, Swedish AssiDoman AB was forced to suspend production at the plant, failing to negotiate with the republican authorities on benefits for payments on debts to the Pension Fund.

In the 1998 election Stepanov gained support from the "Karelia" movement, the Communist Party and the People's Republican Party. His main rival Sergey Katanandov was supported by Our Home – Russia and the Liberal Democratic Party. Stepanov lost both in the first (gaining 34%) and in the second (43.16%) rounds. An attempt to challenge the election results in court ended unsuccessfully.

=== Later offices ===
From December 1998 to December 2001 Stepanov was chief of staff of the executive committee of the Union of Belarus and Russia.

In 2001, after the Federation Council reform, governors of Russian regions, including Sergey Katanandov, lost their right to be ex officio senators. In December 2001 Stepanov was appointed member of the Federation Council from the executive power of Karelia. In May 2002, after Katanandov was elected for a second term, he reaffirmed Stepanov in this position for next four years.

In 2006 Stepanov headed the Russian Party of Life list in the election to the 4th Legislative Assembly of Karelia. Stepanov led the newly formed faction "A Just Russia – LIFE". His membership in A Just Russia party was formalized in April 2008. In 2011 and 2016, he was re-elected as a No.2 of A Just Russia list. In 2021 federal election he ran in the Karelia constituency, finishing fourth with 13% of the vote.

== Awards and honours ==
- Order of Honour
- Honorary citizen of Olonets
- Honorary citizen of Karelia
