= Vladimir Chizhov =

Russian politician and diplomat

- Владимир Чижов
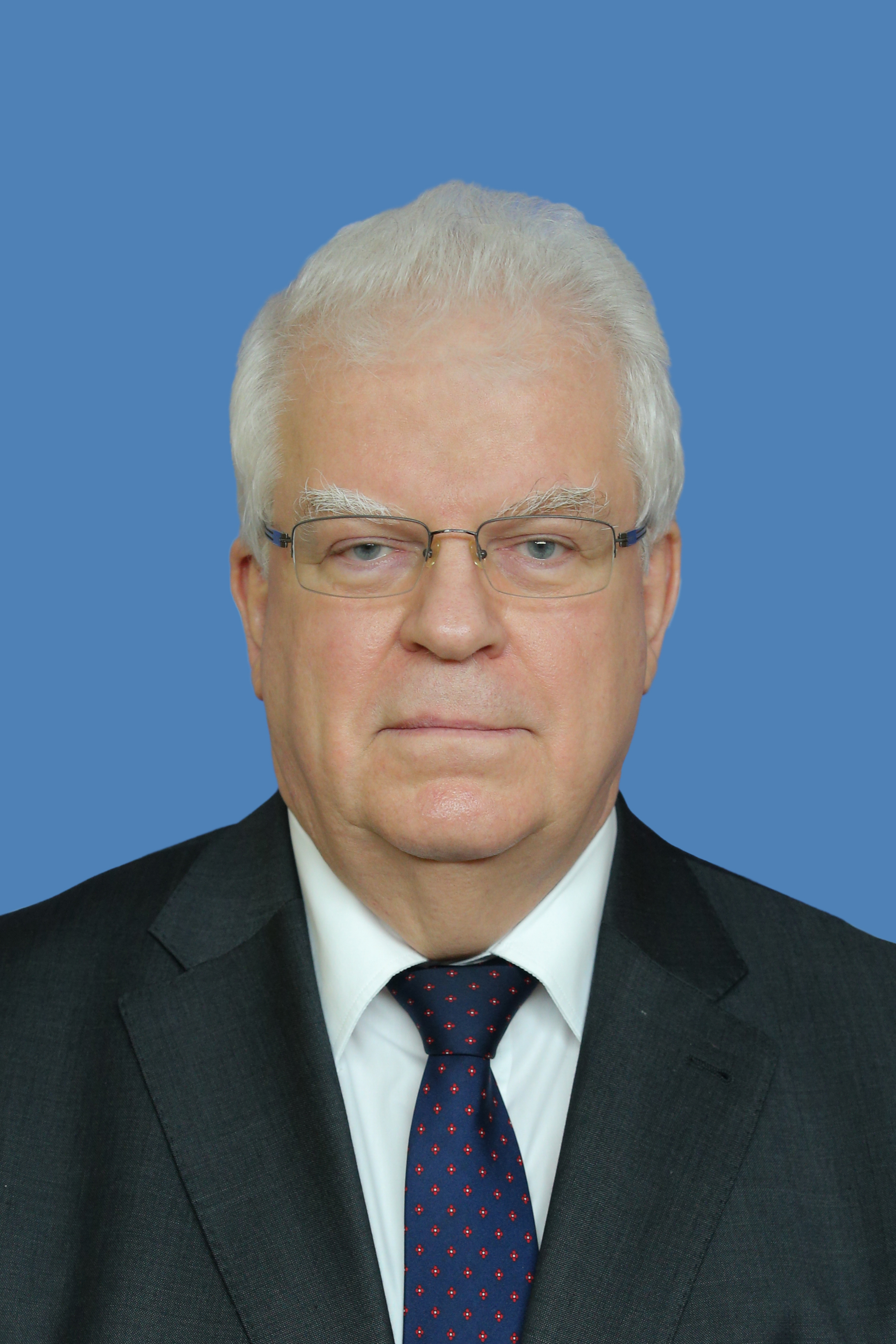
- Chizhov in 2022

Russian Federation Senate from the Republic of Karelia
- Incumbent
- Assumed office 27 September 2022
- Preceded by: Alexander Rakitin

Permanent Representative of Russia to the European Union
- In office 15 July 2005 – 27 September 2022
- Preceded by: Mikhail Fradkov

Deputy Minister of Foreign Affairs
- In office 10 November 2002 – 15 July 2005
- Preceded by: Yury Fedotov
- Succeeded by: Sergey Kislyak

Personal details
- Born: Vladimir Alekseyevich Chizov; 3 December 1953 (age 72) Moscow, Soviet Union

Vladimir Alekseyevich Chizhov (Russian: Владимир Алексеевич Чижов; born on 3 December 1953) is a Russian politician and diplomat. He has been a member of the Federation Council from the executive authority of the Republic of Karelia since 27 September 2022.

He was the Permanent Representative of Russia to the European Union from 2005 to 2022. Before that, he was the Deputy Minister of Foreign Affairs from 2002 to 2005.

Due to Russia's invasion of Ukraine, Chizhov has been sanctioned by the European Union and Switzerland.

== Biography ==
Vladimir Chizhov was born in Moscow on 3 December 1953. In 1976, he graduated with honors from the Moscow State Institute of International Relations and went to work at the USSR Foreign Ministry. Chizhov can speak English, Greek and French. He worked in the embassies of the USSR and Russia in Greece and Cyprus. He has held senior positions in various departments of the Russian Foreign Ministry. He dealt with relations with European countries, issues of conflict resolution.

In 1976, he was an employee of the Soviet Embassy in Athens, Greece. In 1981, he became an employee of the Fifth European Department of the USSR Ministry of Foreign Affairs. From 1985 to 1992, he was an employee of the USSR/Russian Embassy in Nicosia, Cyprus.

In 1992, he became an Advisor to the Second European Department of the Russian Foreign Ministry. From 1992 to 1993, he was Head of the Department for Great Britain and Northern Ireland of the Second European Department of the Russian Ministry of Foreign Affairs. In 1993, he became the deputy director of the Second European Department of the Russian Foreign Ministry. From 1995 to 1996, he was the deputy head of the Russian delegation to the Organization for Security and Co-operation in Europe (OSCE) in Vienna.

From 1996 to 1997, he was the Deputy High Representative for the Peace Settlement in Bosnia and Herzegovina. In 1997 to 1999, he was the Director of the Third European Department of the Russian Foreign Ministry. Between 1997 and 2000, he was Special Representative of the Russian Foreign Ministry for the Cyprus settlement. In 1999, became the Director of the Department for All-European Cooperation of the Russian Foreign Ministry. From 2000 to 2002, he was the Special Representative of the Russian Foreign Ministry for the Balkans. On 10 November 2002, Chizhov was appointed as the Deputy Minister of Foreign Affairs.

On 15 July 2005, Chizhov became the Permanent Representative of Russia to the European Union based in Brussels.

He is an author of a number of articles and studies in the field of European security, on the problems of the OSCE, Russia-EU and Russia-NATO relations, the Mediterranean, the Balkans, the problem of the Cyprus and Northern Irish settlement, peacekeeping operations under the auspices of the UN.

On 27 September 2022, Chizhov became a member of the Federation Council from the executive authority of Karelia.

== Criticism ==
Chizhov is criticized for citing the so-called "Dulles' Plan" as a fact in one of his articles. On 12 May 2020, an article by Chizhov "The choice is always yours" was posted on the website of the Ministry of Foreign Affairs of Russia, dedicated to upholding historical truth in relation to Russia.

The plan of the head of the CIA, Allen Dulles, whose goal was the destruction of the USSR by means of propaganda, disunity of nationalities and social groups, moral decay of the population.

— Chizhov's article on The Dulles Plan

"Dulles' Plan" has been considered a conspiracy theory, since there is no evidence of its existence. Later, part of the text about the plan was since removed from the article.

== Sanctions ==
On 16 December 2022, against the backdrop of Russia's invasion of Ukraine, the EU included Chizhov in the sanctions list, as he "supported and implemented actions and policies that undermine the territorial integrity, sovereignty and independence of Ukraine and further destabilize Ukraine". Switzerland later joined to sanction Chizhov.

== Awards ==
He was awarded the Order of Friendship in 2003.

== Family ==
He has been married twice, and has a son and a daughter.
