= Andrey Nelidov =

Russian politician

- Андрей Нелидов
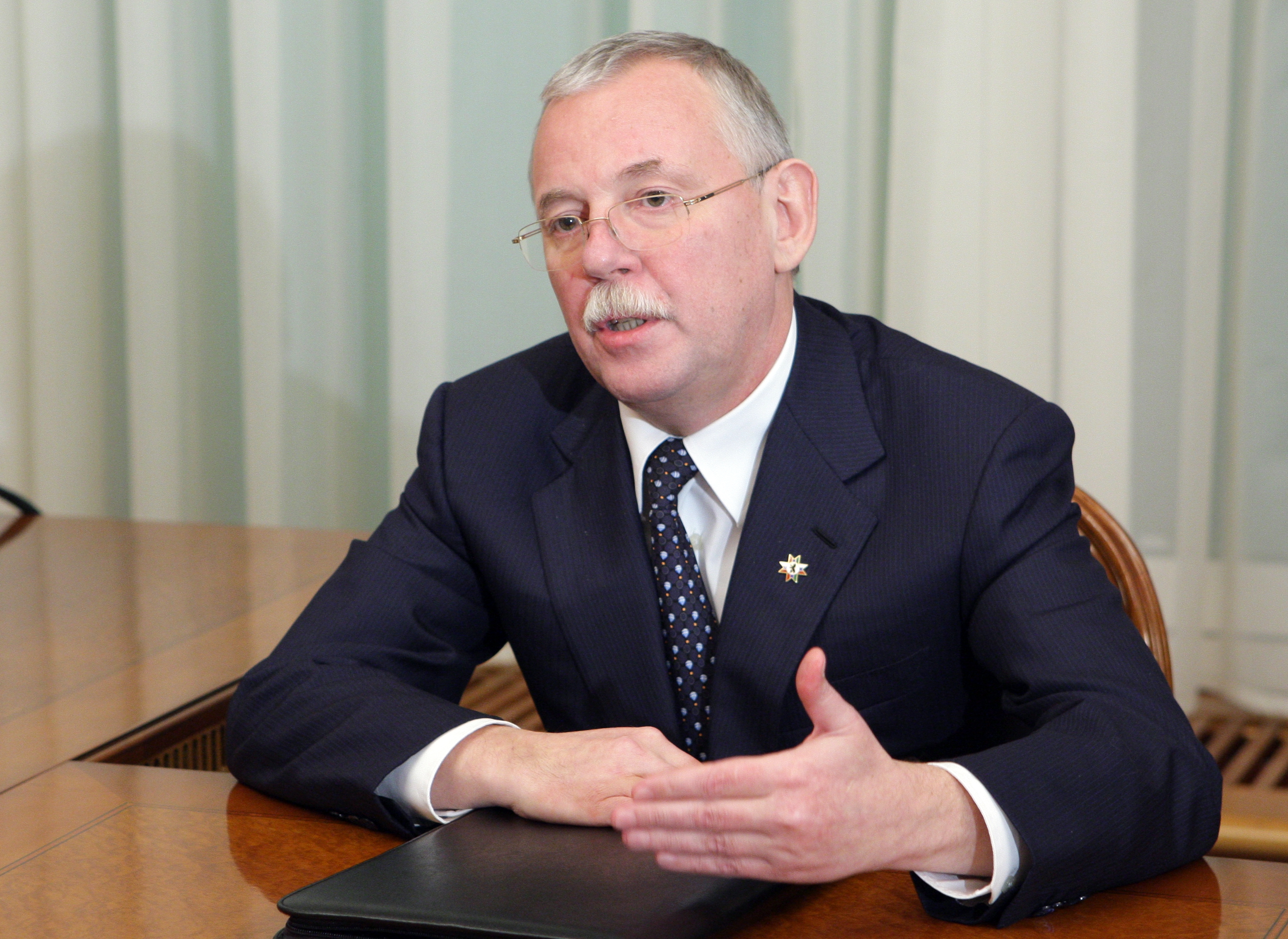
- Nelidov in 2011

Head of the Republic of Karelia
- In office June 30, 2010 – May 22, 2012
- President: Dmitry Medvedev
- Preceded by: Sergey Katanandov
- Succeeded by: Alexander Khudilainen

Russian Federation Senator from the Republic of Karelia
- In office 7 April 2006 – 3 March 2010
- Preceded by: Viktor Stepanov
- Succeeded by: Devletkhan Alikhanov

Personal details
- Born: June 12, 1957 (age 68) Leningrad, RSFSR, USSR
- Party: United Russia
- Profession: Industrial Engineer

Andrey Vitalyevich Nelidov (Russian: Андре́й Вита́льевич Нели́дов) is the former Head of the Republic of Karelia in Russia. He came into power after Sergey Katanandov left office in 2010 for personal reasons, but resigned in 2012.

== Biography ==
Andrei Nelidov is an industrial engineer. His career began in 1996 as vice-governor of Leningrad Oblast and Chairman of the Committee on Forestry. For a while, he was president of the White Sea-Omega Shipping Company. In 2001, he returned as a member of the Parliament of the Leningrad Oblast. In the summer of 2003, Nelidov supported the ex-governor of the region Vadim Gustov, heading his reelection campaign headquarters, for which Nelidov was expelled from the United Russia by the General Council of this party. In 2004, Nelidov was Vice-Speaker of the Legislative Assembly of Leningrad Oblast, returning to the United Russia the next year. In 2006, Nelidov was appointed member of the Federation Council from the Republic of Karelia by its governor Sergey Katanandov as a representative of the executive branch. Following the resignation of Katanandov, Nelidov came in office in June 2010, initially as an acting Head of Karelia. In July 2010, he was nominated as the new Head of the Republic of Karelia. He resigned in May 2012.

In 2013, he became the director of the Kizhi State Open-Air Museum of Cultural History and Architecture. On September 24, 2015, Nelidov was detained on suspicion of accepting a bribe from an entrepreneur.

On 2 March 2018 he was sentenced to eight years in jail and fined 25.7 million roubles for accepting a 4.6 million rouble bribe in 2015. Nelidov applied for parole after serving two-thirds of the sentence and was released in March 2021.

== See also ==
- List of people convicted of corruption in Russia
