= Sergey Katanandov =

Russian politician (born 1955)

- Сергей Катанандов
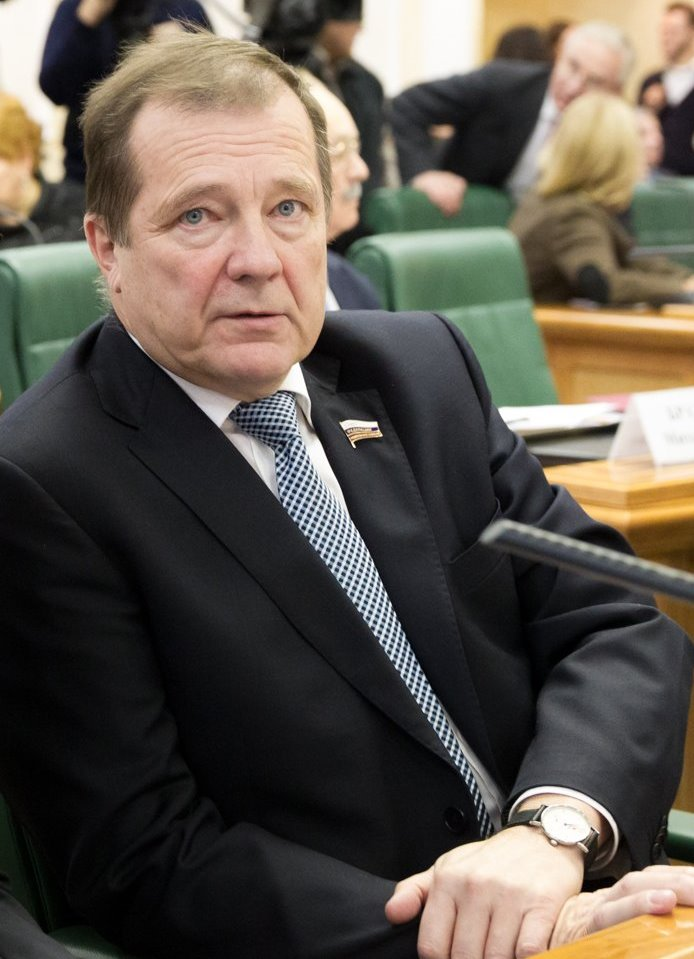
- Katanandov in 2014

Russian Federation Senator from the Republic of Karelia
- In office 22 September 2010 – 25 September 2017
- Preceded by: Devletkhan Alikhanov
- Succeeded by: Alexander Rakitin

Head of the Republic of Karelia
- In office May 12, 2002 – June 30, 2010
- President: Vladimir Putin; Dmitry Medvedev
- Preceded by: Position established
- Succeeded by: Andrey Nelidov

Chairman of the Government of Karelia
- In office June 1, 1998 – May 12, 2002
- Preceded by: Viktor Stepanov
- Succeeded by: himself as Head; Pavel Chernov as Prime Minister

Personal details
- Born: April 21, 1955 (age 71) Petrozavodsk, Karelo-Finnish SSR, Soviet Union
- Party: United Russia
- Profession: Civil Engineer

Sergey Leonidovich Katanandov (Russian: Сергей Леонидович Катанандов; 21 April 1955) is a Russian politician who served as the leader of the Republic of Karelia, an autonomous entity of Russia, in 1998–2010, first as Prime Minister, then as Head of the Republic.

Katanandov was born in 1955, in the Karelian capital of Petrozavodsk. Educated in civil engineering and law, Katanandov served as Mayor of Petrozavodsk from 1990 to 1998, and became Chairman of the Government of Karelia in 1998. From May 2002 till June 30, 2010, he was the Head of the Republic of Karelia.

== Biography ==
Katanandov was born to Karelian parents in Petrozavodsk on April 21, 1955. He graduated from the Faculty of industrial and civil construction of Petrozavodsk State University in 1977. After graduation he worked as a foreman at a construction site. This was followed by a foreman, chief of section, chief engineer of SMU-1 Trust "Petrozavodskstroy, chief engineer of the trust, the head of design and construction of large housing associations. Eventually he ended up becoming a popular politician in Russia. In April 2000, was awarded the Order of Honor. Katanandov is married, and has two sons.
