= Pyotr Latyshev =

Russian politician (1948–2008)

- Пётр Латышев
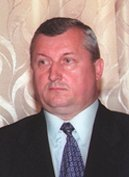
- Latyshev in 2000

1st Russian Presidential Envoy to the Ural Federal District
- In office May 18, 2000 – December 2, 2008
- President: Vladimir Putin; Dmitry Medvedev
- Preceded by: Office establieshed
- Succeeded by: Nikolay Vinnichenko

Personal details
- Born: August 30, 1948 Proskurov, Ukrainian SSR, USSR
- Died: December 2, 2008 (aged 60) Moscow, Russia
- Education: Omsk Academy of the Ministry of Internal Affairs

Pyotr Mikhaylovich Latyshev (Russian: Пётр Михайлович Латышев; 30 August 1948 – 2 December 2008) was the Presidential Envoy to Ural Federal District, Russia. He had the federal state civilian service rank of 1st class Active State Councillor of the Russian Federation.

Latyshev was born in 1948 in Proskurov (now Khmelnitskiy), Ukrainian Soviet Socialist Republic. He attended the Omsk Higher Police School of the Soviet Ministry of Internal Affairs in 1970 and the Omsk Academy of the Ministry of Internal Affairs in 1980.

In 1980, Latyshev began his police career as an inspector for the Department Against Misappropriation of Socialist Property (OBKhSS) a section of the interior ministry's regional directorate for Perm. He also served as an assistant department head, department head, and head of the OBKhSS Directorate of the ministry's regional directorate for Perm.

From 1991–1994, Latyshev was the head of the Interior Ministry's regional directorate for Krasnodar Krai. He was Deputy Minister of the Interior and simultaneously vice-chairman of the Federal Anti-Terrorism Commission from August 1994 to May 2000. Latyshev carried out security operations in Dagestan in 1999 and was highly successful at defusing ethnic tensions in Karachay–Cherkessia.

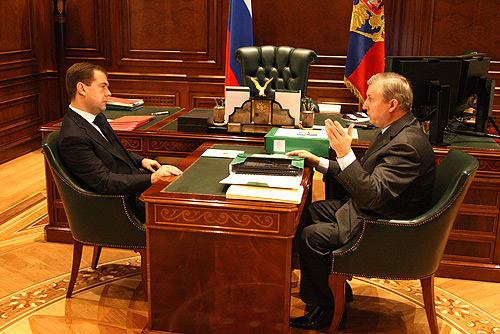
Latyshev with President Dmitry Medvedev on 30 October 2008.

The main responsibility of a presidential envoy to any of the seven regions is the ensurance of presidential authority in that region. Loyalty and knowledge of the region are therefore the most highly valued traits in a prospective envoy.

Latyshev died suddenly on December 2, 2008, due to heart failure.

== Honours and awards ==
- Order of Merit for the Fatherland;
  - 3rd class (30 August 2008) - for outstanding contribution to strengthening Russian statehood and many years of diligent work
  - 4th class
- Order of Honour (17 April 1998) - for services in the development of physical culture and sports, many years of fruitful work at the All-fiekulturno sports society "Dynamo"
- Order of St. Sergius, 1st class (Russian Orthodox Church, 2003)
