= Emilia Slabunova =

Russian politician

- Эмилия Слабунова
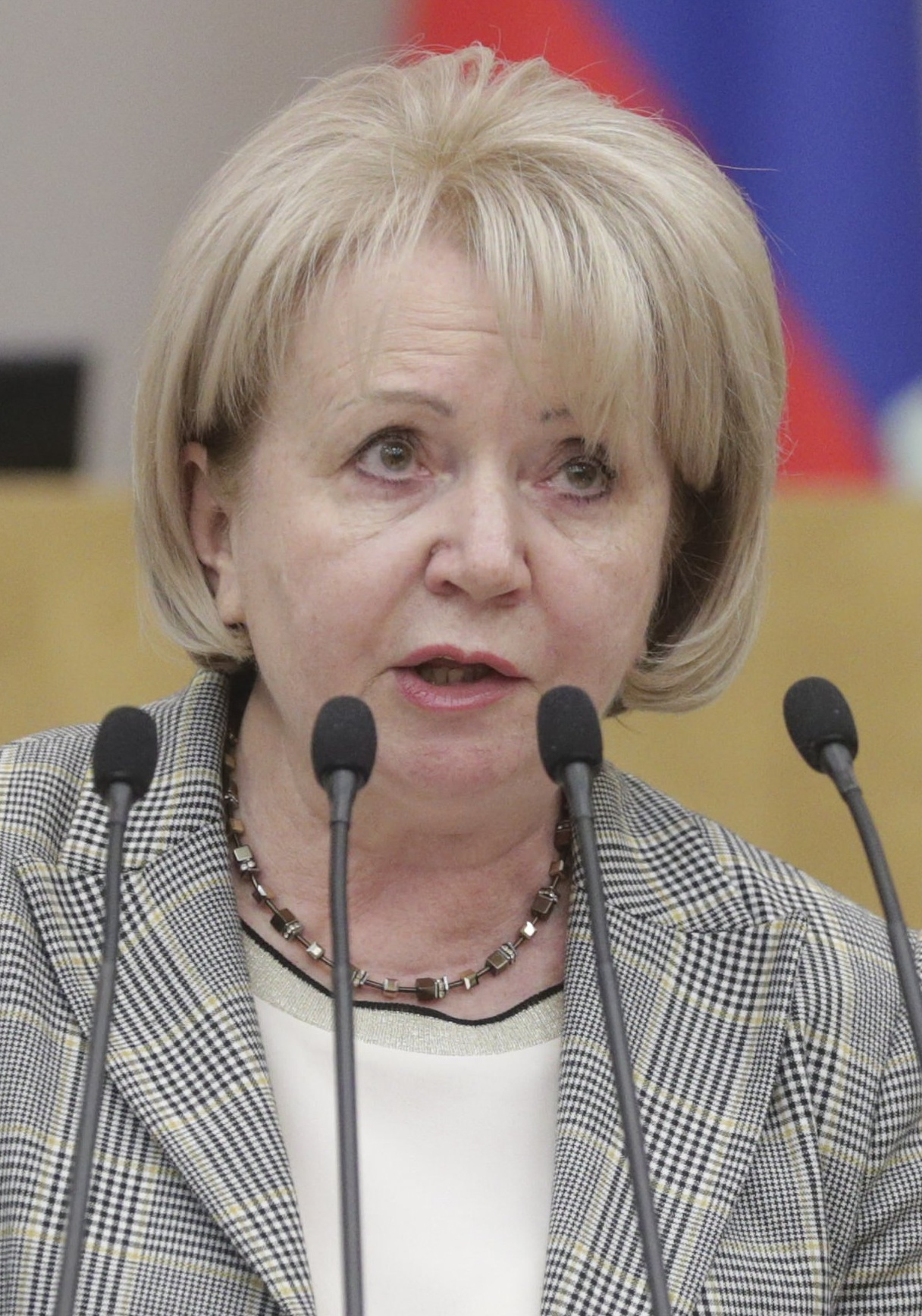
- Slabunova in 2019

Leader of Yabloko
- In office 20 December 2015 – 15 December 2019
- Preceded by: Sergey Mitrokhin
- Succeeded by: Nikolay Rybakov

Member of the Karelia Legislative Assembly
- Incumbent
- Assumed office 4 December 2011

Personal details
- Born: Emilia Edgardovna Slabunova; 7 October 1958 (age 67) Ufa, Bashkortostan, Russian SFSR, Soviet Union
- Party: Yabloko
- Spouse: Alexander Slabunov
- Children: Anastasiya (1981) and Kirill (1984)

Emilia Edgardovna Slabunova (Russian: Эмилия Эдгардовна Слабунова; born 7 October 1958) is a Russian politician. She was leader of Yabloko party from 2015 to 2019 and a member of the Legislative Assembly of the Republic of Karelia since 2011.

== Political career ==
In 2001 she was elected as a deputy of Petrozavodsk City Council. She failed to gain enough votes to be elected the chairwoman.

She joined the Yabloko party in 2003. She ran for the Legislative Assembly of the Republic of Karelia in 2006, but the Yabloko slate was annulated by the republican authority.

She was elected as a deputy of the fifth Legislative Assembly of the Republic of Karelia in December 2011.

In September 2013 Slabunova was the main oppositional candidate for the Mayor of Petrozavodsk. Her candidacy was withdrawn by the Petrozavodsk District Court two weeks prior to the election due to a violation of rules filling one of the documents. This decision was confirmed by the Supreme Court of the Republic of Karelia. Later on, the chair was taken by another Yabloko candidate, Galina Shirshina.

After the election, Slabunova quit her job as a principal in one of the schools to become the chairwoman for the expert council for Shirshina in October 2013.

Later on, she actively opposed the Head of the Republic of Karelia, Alexander Khudilaynen, seeking to remove her from the chair due to a political escalation in the region as well as persecution of Yabloko members. In May 2015 she led the rally for resignation of the Head. On 23 June she sent 10,000 signatures to the President of Russia for Khudilaynen to be discharged.

== Yabloko leader ==
On 19 December 2015, on the XVIII Party Conference, she was elected as the new leader of Yabloko, beating Alexander Gnezdilov, Nikolay Rybakov, and Lev Schlosberg, with the former two supporting her in the second tour. She was also supported by Grigory Yavlinsky.

On 4 July 2016, she was officially announced as the candidate for federal legislative election from Yabloko.

On 15 December 2019, during the party Congress, Slabunova lost re-election and was defeated by Nikolay Rybakov.
