= Alexander Rakitin =

Russian politician (born 1958)

- Александр Ракитин
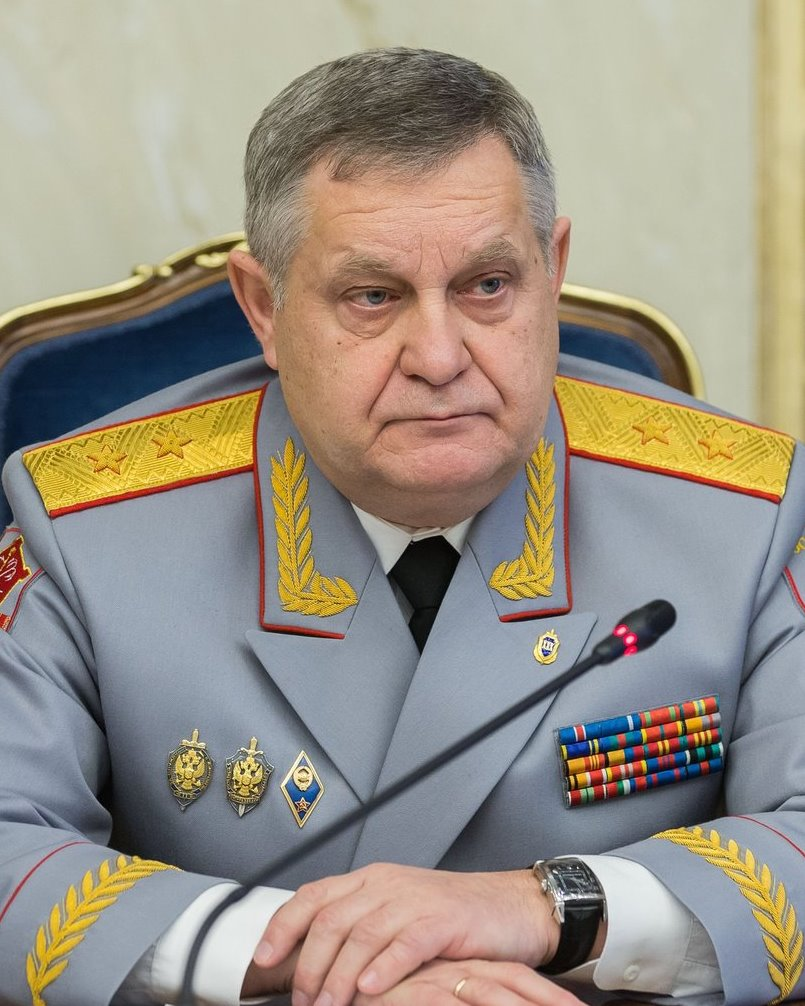

Senator from the Republic of Karelia
- In office 26 September 2017 – 25 September 2022
- Preceded by: Sergey Katanandov
- Succeeded by: Vladimir Chizhov

Personal details
- Born: Alexander Rakitin; 17 May 1958 (age 68) Ostrov, Ostrovsky District, Pskov Oblast, Soviet Union
- Education: Riga Higher Military Political School

Alexander Vasilyevich Rakitin (Russian: Александр Васильевич Ракитин; born 17 May 1958) is a Russian politician who served as a senator from the Republic of Karelia from 2017 to 2022.

== Career ==
Alexander Rakitin was born on 17 May 1958 in Ostrov, Ostrovsky District, Pskov Oblast. In 1979, he graduated from the Riga Higher Military Political School. Afterward, Rakitin served at the Federal Security Service. From 2017 to 2022, he represented Republic of Karelia in the Federation Council.

== Sanctions ==
Alexander Rakitin is under personal sanctions introduced by the European Union, the United Kingdom, the United States, Canada, Switzerland, Australia, Ukraine, New Zealand, for ratifying the decisions of the "Treaty of Friendship, Cooperation and Mutual Assistance between the Russian Federation and the Donetsk People's Republic and between the Russian Federation and the Luhansk People's Republic" and providing political and economic support for Russia's annexation of Ukrainian territories.
