= Federal Bailiff Service =

- Emblem of the Federal Bailiff Service

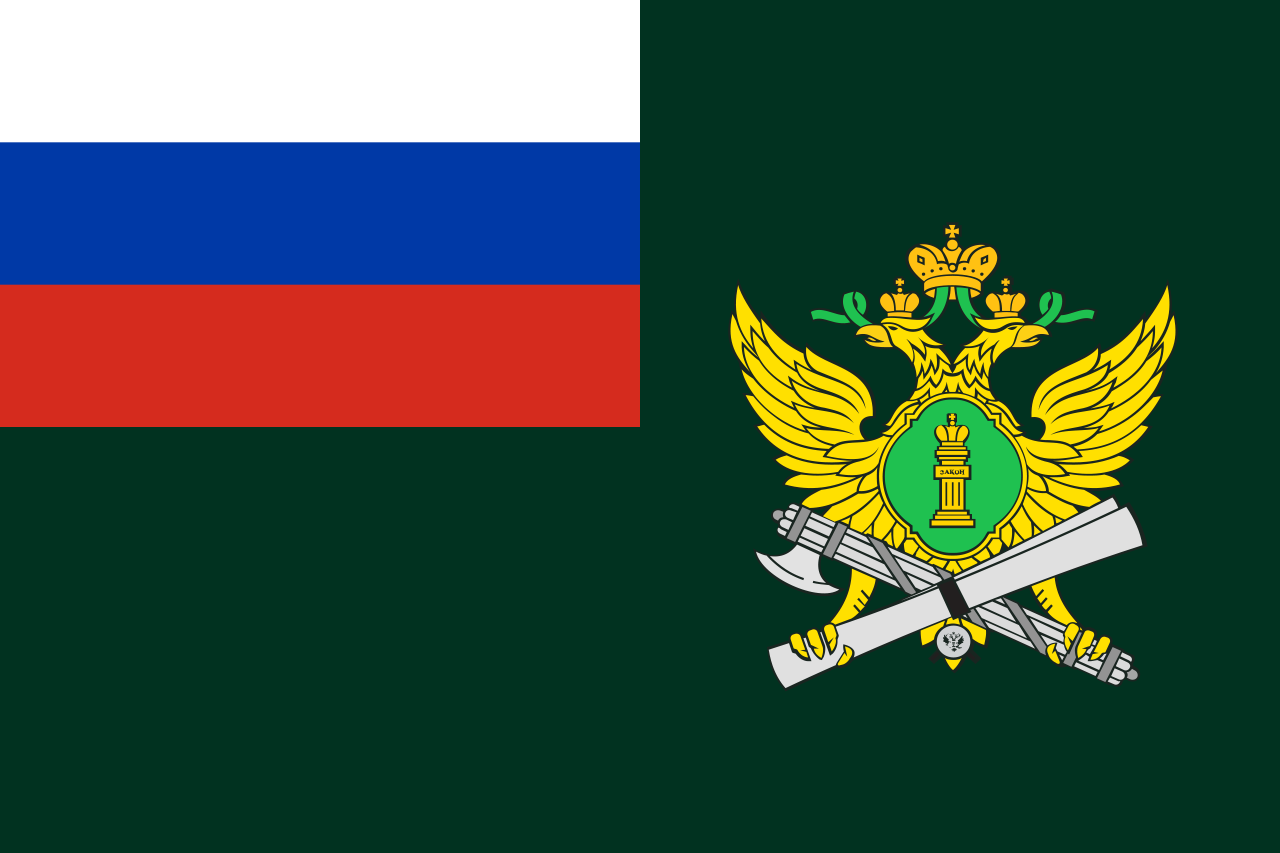
- Flag of the Federal Bailiff Service
- Abbreviation: FSSP

Agency overview
- Formed: November 6, 1997 as Department of Bailiffs
- Employees: 74,559
- Legal personality: Governmental: Government agency

Jurisdictional structure
- National agency: Russia
- Federal agency: Russia
- Operations jurisdiction: Russia
- Governing body: Ministry of Justice
- General nature: Federal law enforcement

Operational structure
- Headquarters: 16 Kuznetsky Most, Moscow
- Agency executive: Sergey Sazanov, Director
- Parent agency: Ministry of Justice

Website
- fssp.gov.ru

The Federal Bailiff Service (FSSP, Russian: Федеральная служба судебных приставов [ФССП], Federalnaya Sluzhba Sudebnykh Pristavov, FSSP Rossii) is a federal law enforcement agency of the Ministry of Justice of Russia.

The FSSP is the enforcement arm of the Judiciary of Russia, serving as the primary agency for protection of officers of the court, effective operation of the judiciary, fugitive operations, and providing security services and maintaining order within court facilities across Russia. The FSSP's head office is located at 16 Kuznetsky Most, Central Administrative Okrug, Moscow.

The FSSP was created during the presidency of Boris Yeltsin as the Department of Bailiffs in November 1997, and was elevated to a federal agency by Vladimir Putin in 2004. Sergey Sazanov has been the Acting Director of the FSSP and Chief Bailiff of the Russian Federation since February 2017.

== Functions and Powers ==
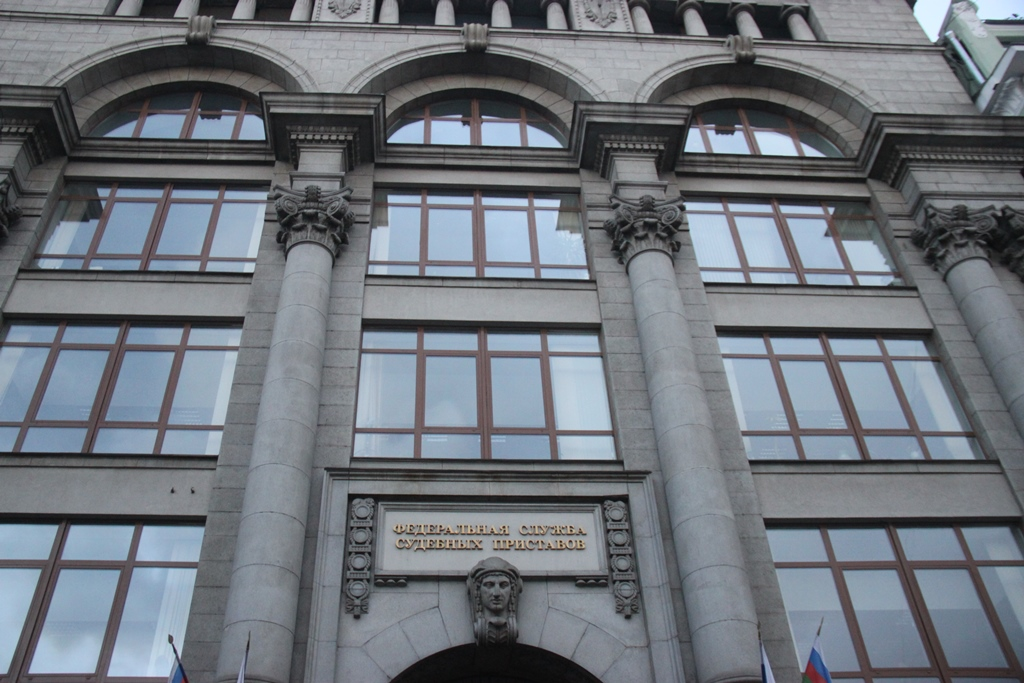
The headquarters of the FSSP at 16 Kuznetsky Most, Moscow.

- Prisoner transport and processing
- Judicial security
- Bailiff services
- Courthouse security
- 24-hour prisoner lockup jails and cell blocks
- Protection of court buildings
- Guard services to judges and other officers of the court

The Federal Bailiff Service is the only authorized body of the Russian executive authority coercing the execution of the judicial decision. The FSSP ensures proper and timely execution of judicial acts, acts of other bodies and officials, as well as in cases stipulated by the legislation of the Russian Federation, execution of other documents in order to protect the abused rights, freedoms and legitimate interests of citizens and organizations.

Federal Bailiffs may search people as they enter the court and remove them if they refuse to be searched, they can also remove people in order to enable court business to be carried on without interference or delay, maintain order and secure the safety of any person in the court building. Officers may ask a person to surrender (and failing that seize) property if they believe it may jeopardise the maintenance of order in the court, put the safety of any person in the court building at risk, or may be evidence of, or in relation to, an offence. Federal Bailiffs are required to be biennially certified in the use of pepper spray, handcuffs, and defensive batons.

== History ==
The Bailiffs’ Service formed in 1997, when federal laws No. 118 from 21 July 1997 "On Bailiffs" and Federal law 119 "On Enforcement Proceedings" were adopted. These laws fundamentally changed the system of enforcement proceedings in Russia and were legal basis for organizing an independent institution of bailiffs, and was known as The Department of Bailiffs of the Justice Ministry, and was acting under the order of the Russian Ministry of Justice from 22 September 2000 "On Approval of the Department of Bailiffs".

The Department became a Federal Service after it was formed by the Decree of the President of Russia Vladimir Putin, from 9 March 2004, Decree Number 314 "On the system and structure of the federal executive authorities".

== Directors ==
The FSSP is headed by a director, a position which is accompanied with the title of Chief Bailiff of the Russian Federation.

The current director is Sergey Sazanov, who has held the position since 15 February 2017. Sazanov was appointed as acting director following the appointment of Director Artur Parfenchikov as Head of the Republic of Karelia.

| # | Name | Term | Notes |
|---|---|---|---|
| 1 | Boris Kondrashov | November 6, 1997 – September 1999 | First Director of the Bailiffs Department; Deputy for the Justice Minister |
| 2 | Arkady Melnikov | November 1999 – 21 October 2004 | Director of the Bailiffs Department; Deputy for the Justice Minister |
| 3 | Nikolai Vinichenko | 21 October 2004 – 29 December 2008 | First Director of Federal Bailiff Service and Chief Bailiff of the Russian Federation |
| 4 | Artur Parfenchikov | 29 December 2008 – 15 February 2017 | Director of the Federal Bailiff Service and Chief Bailiff of the Russian Federation |
| 5 | Dmitry Aristov | 20 March 2017 – present | Director of the Federal Bailiff Service and Chief Bailiff of the Russian Federation |

== Ranks and rank insignia ==
On the basis of the Federal Law of 01.10.2019 N 328-FZ "On Service in the Compulsory Enforcement Bodies of the Russian Federation and Amendments to Certain Legislative Acts of the Russian Federation", class rates were replaced with special ranks.

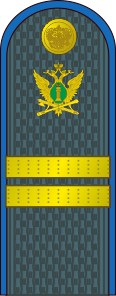
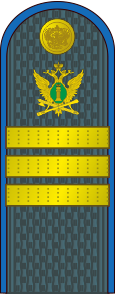
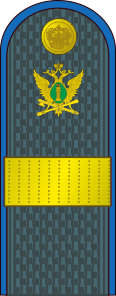
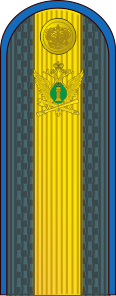
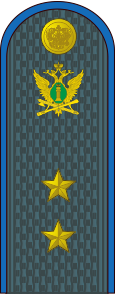
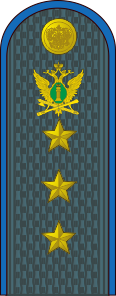
| Description | Junior command staff |
| Shoulder straps |
|---|---|---|---|---|---|---|
| Special ranks | Junior sergeant of Internal Service | Sergeant of Internal Service | Senior sergeant of Internal Service | Starshina of Internal Service | Praporschik of Internal Service | Senior praporschik of Internal Service |

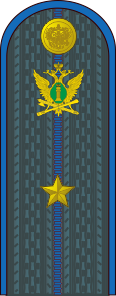
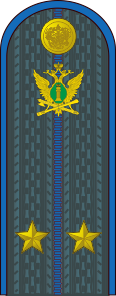
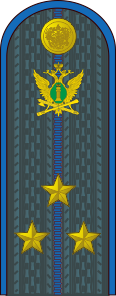
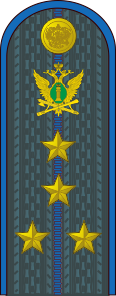
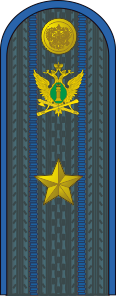
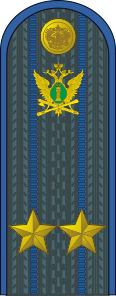
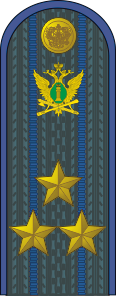
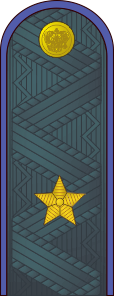
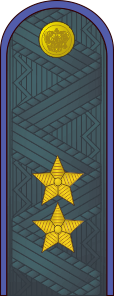
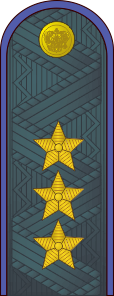
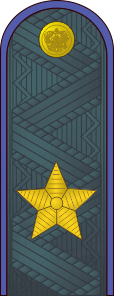
| Description | Middle, senior and higher command staff |
| Shoulder straps |
|---|---|---|---|---|---|---|---|---|---|---|---|
| Special Ranks | Junior lieutenant of Internal Service | Lieutenant of Internal Service | Senior lieutenant of Internal Service | Captain of Internal Service | Major of Internal Service | Lieutenant colonel of Internal Service | Colonel of Internal Service | Major general of Internal Service | Lieutenant general of Internal Service | Colonel general of Internal Service | General of Internal Service of the Russian Federation |

== See also ==
- United States Marshals Service
  - Supreme Court Police
  - New York State Court Officers
- Court security officer (England and Wales), UK equivalent
