= Municipal filter (Russia) =

Municipal filter is a procedure for collecting signatures of deputies of representative bodies of municipal entities in support of candidates for the posts of regional heads, as provided for by Russian legislation. The threshold is established in the amount of 5 (Novgorod and Tomsk regions, Sevastopol) to 10 percent (Belgorod and Yaroslavl regions) of the total number of local deputies.

== Literature ==
- Cameron Ross (2016) Systemic and Non-Systemic Opposition in the Russian Federation: Civil Society Awakens? - Routledge; ISBN 1317047222, ISBN 9781317047223.
- The Territories of the Russian Federation 2016 / Europa Publications - Routledge, 2016; ISBN 1317273591, ISBN 9781317273592.
- William M Reisinger, Bryon J Moraski (2017) The Regional Roots of Russia's Political Regime - University of Michigan Press; ISBN 0472130188, ISBN 9780472130184.
