= Head of the Republic of Karelia =

Highest-ranking official in Karelia, Russia

- Глава Республики Карелия (Russian)
- Flag of Karelia with coat of arms

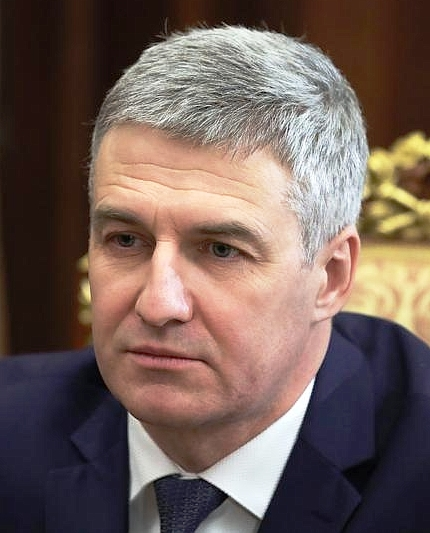
- Incumbent; Artur Parfenchikov since 15 February 2017
- Executive branch of the Republic of Karelia
- Style: His Excellency; The Honorable
- Type: Governor; Head of state; Head of government
- Residence: Petrozavodsk
- Term length: 5 years, renewable
- Precursor: Chairmen of the Presidium of the Supreme Soviet
- Formation: April 1994 (chairman of the government); 12 May 2002 (current form)
- First holder: Sergey Katanandov
- Salary: $ 68,000
- Website: Official website

The head of the Republic of Karelia (Russian: Глава Республики Карелия) is the highest-ranking official of the Republic of Karelia, a federal subject of Russia. Since the fall of the Soviet Union, four people have served as heads of the republic.

== List of officeholders ==
No.	Portrait	Name (born–died)	Term of office			Political party	Election	Ref.
No.	Portrait	Name (born–died)	Took office	Left office	Time in office	Political party	Election	Ref.
Chairman of the Government (1994–2002)
1		Viktor Stepanov (born 1947)	17 May 1994	1 June 1998	4 years, 15 days	Communist Party	1994	
2		Sergey Katanandov (born 1955)	1 June 1998	12 May 2002	3 years, 345 days	Fatherland – All Russia	1998	
Head of the Republic (2002–present)
2		Sergey Katanandov (born 1955)	12 May 2002	30 June 2010	8 years, 49 days	United Russia	2002; 2006 (Note: Appointed by the President of Russia with the consent of the Legislative Assembly.)	
–		Andrey Nelidov (born 1957)	1 July 2010	21 July 2010	1 year, 326 days	United Russia	– (Note: Acting head of the republic.)	
3		Andrey Nelidov (born 1957)	21 July 2010	22 May 2012	1 year, 326 days	United Russia	2010	
–		Aleksandr Hudilainen (born 1956)	22 May 2012	24 May 2012	4 years, 269 days	United Russia	–	
4		Aleksandr Hudilainen (born 1956)	22 May 2012	15 February 2017	4 years, 269 days	United Russia	2012	
–		Artur Parfenchikov (born 1964)	15 February 2017	25 September 2017	9 years, 204 days	Independent	–	
5		Artur Parfenchikov (born 1964)	25 September 2017	Incumbent	9 years, 204 days	United Russia	2017; 2022	

== Source ==
- Russian Administrative divisions
