= Aleksandr Hudilainen =

Russian politician

- Александр Худилайнен
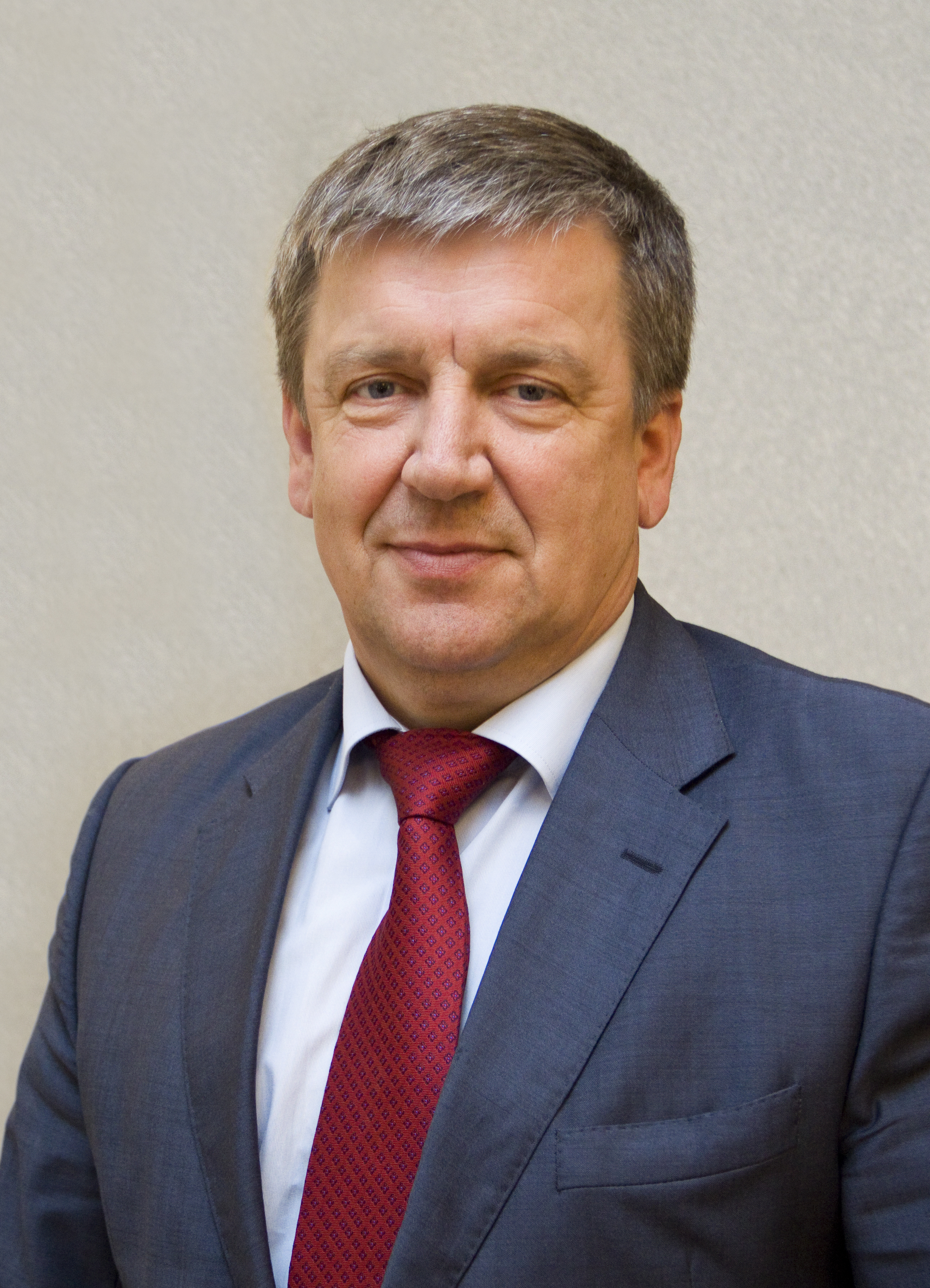
- Official portrait, 2012

Head of the Republic of Karelia
- In office 22 May 2012 – 15 February 2017
- President: Dmitry Medvedev; Vladimir Putin
- Preceded by: Andrey Nelidov
- Succeeded by: Artur Parfenchikov

Chairman of the Legislative Assembly of Leningrad Oblast
- In office 15 December 2011 – 20 May 2012
- Preceded by: Ivan Khabarov
- Succeeded by: Sergey Bebenin

Personal details
- Born: 2 May 1956 (age 70) Zlobino, Kashinsky District, Kalinin Oblast, Russian Soviet Republic, Soviet Union (now Tver Oblast, Russia)
- Party: United Russia

Aleksandr Petrovich Hudilainen (Russian: Александр Петрович Худилайнен, finnicized as Aleksanteri Petrovitš Hutilainen, born May 2, 1956) is a Russian politician. He was the third Head of the Republic of Karelia, a federal subject of Russia. He came into power after Andrey Nelidov left office in 2012. He resigned on February 15, 2017 and was succeeded by Artur Parfenchikov.

He is president of the sport federation of skiing and snowboarding of the Leningrad oblast.

Hudilainen is of Ingrian Finnish heritage. He is fluent in Finnish.
