= 2026 Jewish Autonomous Oblast legislative election =

Regional legislative election in Russia

- 18–20 September 2026

All 19 seats in the Legislative Assembly 10 seats needed for a majority
- Turnout: 56.16% ▼6.18 pp
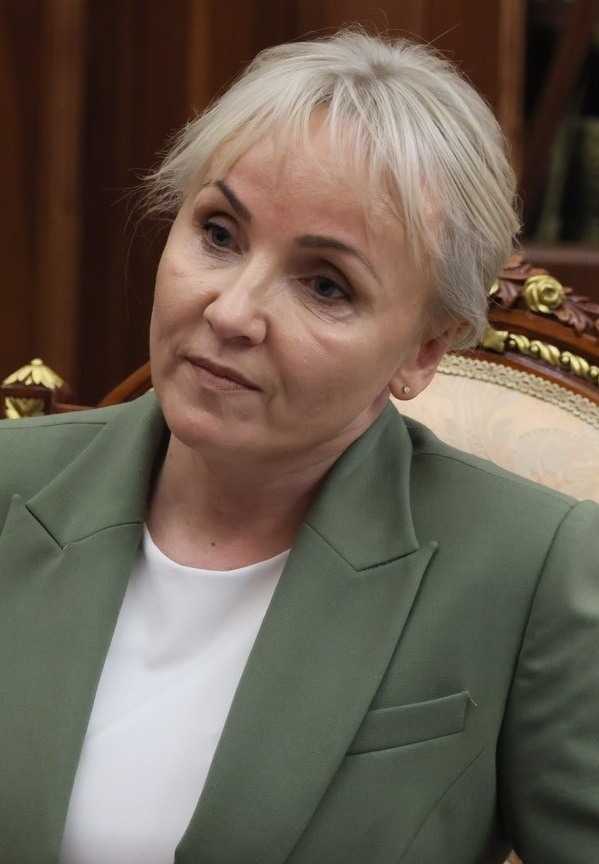

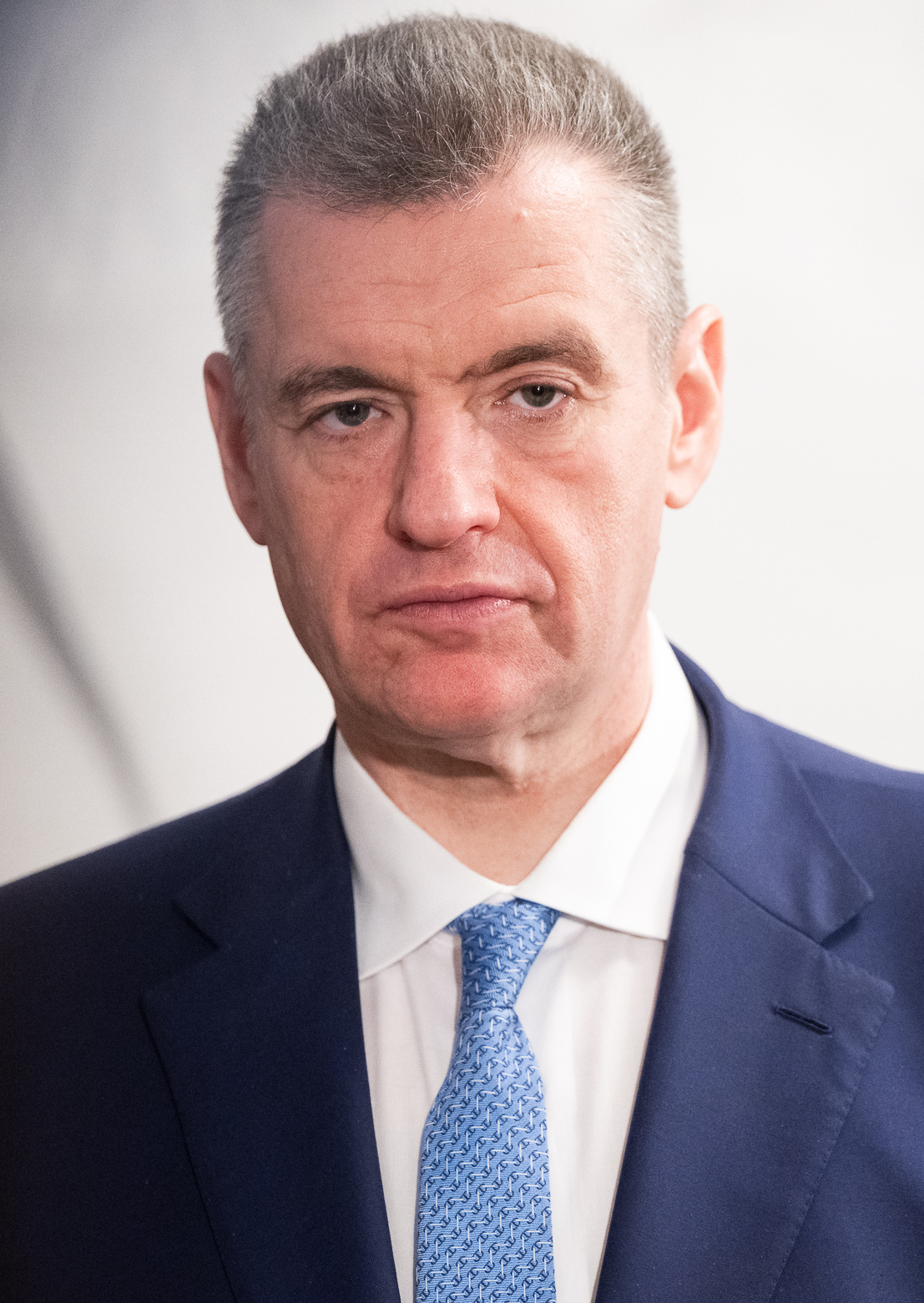
	Majority party	Minority party	Third party
		CPRF
Candidate	Maria Kostyuk	Yevgeny Konopatkin	Leonid Slutsky
Party	United Russia	CPRF	LDPR
Last election	51.86%, 14 seats	19.04%, 2 seats	9.28%, 1 seat
Seats won	14	2	1
Seat change	Steady	Steady	Steady
Popular vote	33,995	10,179	6,808
Percentage	54.23%	16.24%	10.86%
Swing	▲2.37 pp	▼2.80 pp	▲1.58 pp
	Fourth party	Fifth party	Sixth party
	PPD	SR	NL
Candidate	Yulia Kharchenko	Aleksey Tshchedushnov	Ivan Prokhodtsev
Party	Party of Direct Democracy	A Just Russia	New People
Last election	5.93%, 1 seat	5.50%, 1 seat	Did not participate
Seats won	1	1	0
Seat change	Steady	Steady	Did not participate
Popular vote	3,709	3,312	3,088
Percentage	5.92%	5.28%	4.93%
Swing	▼0.01 pp	▼0.22 pp	Did not participate
Chairman before election
Andrey Golub
United Russia
Elected Chairman
Aleksandr Dobrovolsky
United Russia
Senator before election
Roman Boyko
United Russia
Senator after election
Svetlana Lukash
United Russia

The 2026 Legislative Assembly of the Jewish Autonomous Oblast election took place on 18–20 September 2026, on common election day, coinciding with the 2026 Russian legislative election. All 19 seats in the Legislative Assembly were up for re-election.

United Russia retained its overwhelming majority in the Legislative Assembly, winning 54.2% of the vote and all 9 single-mandate constituencies. Communist Party of the Russian Federation, Liberal Democratic Party of Russia, Party of Direct Democracy and A Just Russia all retained their seats, while New People narrowly failed to cross the 5% threshold.

== Electoral system ==
Under current election laws, the Legislative Assembly is elected for a term of five years, with parallel voting. 10 seats are elected by party-list proportional representation with a 5% electoral threshold, with the other part elected in 9 single-member constituencies by first-past-the-post voting. Seats in the proportional part are allocated using the Imperiali quota, modified to ensure that every party list, which passes the threshold, receives at least one mandate.

== Candidates ==
=== Party lists ===
To register regional lists of candidates, parties need to collect 0.5% of signatures of all registered voters in Jewish Autonomous Oblast.

The following parties were relieved from the necessity to collect signatures:

- United Russia
- Communist Party of the Russian Federation
- Liberal Democratic Party of Russia
- A Just Russia
- New People
- Party of Direct Democracy

№	Party	Oblast-wide list	Candidates	Territorial groups	Status
1	United Russia	Maria Kostyuk • Svetlana Lukash • Aleksandr Dobrovolsky	30	9	Registered
2	Party of Direct Democracy	Yulia Kharchenko	9	8	Registered
3	Liberal Democratic Party	Leonid Slutsky • Vasily Gladkikh	18	9	Registered
4	New People	Ivan Prokhodtsev • Vyacheslav Pastukhov • Pavel Malyshev	17	8	Registered
5	A Just Russia	Aleksey Tshchedushnov • Natalya Polodyuk	11	7	Registered
6	Communist Party	Yevgeny Konopatkin • Nina Kalyukina	16	9	Registered

New People will take part in the Jewish Autonomous Oblast legislative election for the first time. Communists of Russia and Rodina, which participated in the last election, did not file.

=== Single-mandate constituencies ===
9 single-mandate constituencies were formed in Jewish Autonomous Oblast. To register candidates in single-mandate constituencies need to collect 3% of signatures of registered voters in the constituency.

Number of candidates in single-mandate constituencies
Party	Candidates	
Party	Nominated	Registered
United Russia	9	9
Communist Party	9	7
Liberal Democratic Party	9	9
A Just Russia	5	3
New People	9	9
Independent	2	0
Total	43	37

== Results ==
=== Results by party lists ===
Summary of the 18–20 September 2026 Legislative Assembly of the Jewish Autonomous Oblast election results
Party	Party list					Constituency		Total	
Party	Votes	%	±pp	Seats	+/–	Seats	+/–	Seats	+/–
United Russia	33,995	54.23	▲2.37	5	Steady	9	Steady	14	Steady
Communist Party	10,179	16.24	▼2.80	2	Steady	0	Steady	2	Steady
Liberal Democratic Party	6,808	10.86	▲1.58	1	Steady	0	Steady	1	Steady
Party of Direct Democracy	3,709	5.92	▼0.01	1	Steady	–	–	1	Steady
A Just Russia	3,312	5.28	▼0.22	1	Steady	0	Steady	1	Steady
New People	3,088	4.93	New	0	New	0	New	0	New
Invalid ballots	1,597	2.55	▼1.48	—	—	—	—	—	—
Total	62,688	100.00	—	10	Steady	9	Steady	19	Steady
Turnout	62,688	56.16	▼6.18	—	—	—	—	—	—
Registered voters	111,614	100.00	—	—	—	—	—	—	—

Chief of the Jewish Autonomous Oblast Police Aleksandr Dobrovolsky (United Russia) was elected Chairman of the Legislative Assembly, replacing outgoing Chairman Andrey Golub (United Russia), who became Deputy Chairman of the Legislative Assembly. Deputy Chief of the Presidential Experts’ Directorate Svetlana Lukash (United Russia) was appointed to the Federation Council, replacing incumbent Senator Roman Boyko (United Russia).

=== Results in single-member constituencies ===
==== District 1 ====
Summary of the 18–20 September 2026 Legislative Assembly of the Jewish Autonomous Oblast election in Birobidzhansky city constituency No.1
Candidate	Party	Votes	%
Vitaly Kachan	United Russia	3,152	48.25%
Nina Kalyukina	Communist Party	1,367	20.92%
Vasily Gladkikh	Liberal Democratic Party	1,016	15.55%
Valeria Rozum	New People	602	9.21%
Total		6,533	100%

==== District 2 ====
Summary of the 18–20 September 2026 Legislative Assembly of the Jewish Autonomous Oblast election in Birobidzhansky city constituency No.2
Candidate	Party	Votes	%
Kirill Devyatko	United Russia	3,662	54.90%
Aleksandr Bolotnov	Communist Party	1,417	21.24%
Natalia Miroshkina	Liberal Democratic Party	801	12.01%
Andrey Kuritskikh	New People	456	6.84%
Total		6,670	100%

==== District 3 ====
Summary of the 18–20 September 2026 Legislative Assembly of the Jewish Autonomous Oblast election in Birobidzhansky city constituency No.3
Candidate	Party	Votes	%
Andrey Golub (incumbent)	United Russia	3,506	57.13%
Eduard Zharikov	Communist Party	814	13.26%
Tatyana Slutskaya	Liberal Democratic Party	707	11.52%
Pavel Malyshev	New People	546	8.90%
Viktor Yeryomichev	A Just Russia	216	3.52%
Total		6,137	100%

==== District 4 ====
Summary of the 18–20 September 2026 Legislative Assembly of the Jewish Autonomous Oblast election in Teploozyorsky constituency No.4
Candidate	Party	Votes	%
Maksim Galachyov	United Russia	3,310	49.10%
Olga Kazanskaya	Liberal Democratic Party	1,358	20.15%
Roman Komogortsev	Communist Party	1,030	15.28%
Aleksandr Bondarev	New People	719	10.67%
Total		6,741	100%

==== District 5 ====
Summary of the 18–20 September 2026 Legislative Assembly of the Jewish Autonomous Oblast election in Obluchensky constituency No.5
Candidate	Party	Votes	%
Yelena Gudkova	United Russia	4,756	62.05%
Sergey Gotovchenko	Liberal Democratic Party	1,615	21.07%
Konstantin Krylov	New People	1,179	15.38%
Total		7,665	100%

==== District 6 ====
Summary of the 18–20 September 2026 Legislative Assembly of the Jewish Autonomous Oblast election in Oktyabrsky constituency No.6
Candidate	Party	Votes	%
Aleksandr Dobrovolsky	United Russia	4,250	74.18%
Artyom Velichko	New People	834	14.56%
Aleksandr Tayenkov	Liberal Democratic Party	480	8.38%
Total		5,729	100%

==== District 7 ====
Summary of the 18–20 September 2026 Legislative Assembly of the Jewish Autonomous Oblast election in Leninsky constituency No.7
Candidate	Party	Votes	%
Aleksey Chunikhin	United Russia	3,269	60.20%
Valeria Drobysheva	Communist Party	843	15.52%
Anastasia Samarkanova	Liberal Democratic Party	630	11.60%
Olesya Turenko	New People	464	8.55%
Total		5,430	100%

==== District 8 ====
Summary of the 18–20 September 2026 Legislative Assembly of the Jewish Autonomous Oblast election in Birobidzhansky constituency No.8
Candidate	Party	Votes	%
Roman Stashkov	United Russia	4,823	61.24%
Tatyana Gasanova	Communist Party	1,028	13.05%
Anastasia Kultayeva	Liberal Democratic Party	996	12.65%
Yekaterina Chugaynova	New People	457	5.80%
Natalya Polodyuk	A Just Russia	400	5.08%
Total		7,875	100%

==== District 9 ====
Summary of the 18–20 September 2026 Legislative Assembly of the Jewish Autonomous Oblast election in Smidovichsky constituency No.9
Candidate	Party	Votes	%
Tatyana Altukhova (incumbent)	United Russia	5,328	56.92%
Tatyana Kochnova	Communist Party	1,683	17.98%
Roman Yegozov	Liberal Democratic Party	1,352	14.44%
Ksenia Voronaya	A Just Russia	579	6.19%
Olga Berezinets	New People	291	3.11%
Total		9,360	100%

=== Members ===
Incumbent deputies are highlighted with bold, elected members who declined to take a seat are marked with ~~strikethrough~~.

Constituency
No.	Member	Party
1	Vitaly Kachan	United Russia
2	Kirill Devyatko	United Russia
3	Andrey Golub	United Russia
4	Maksim Galachev	United Russia
5	Yelena Gudkova	United Russia
6	Aleksandr Dobrovolsky	United Russia
7	Aleksey Chunikhin	United Russia
8	Roman Stashkov	United Russia
9	Tatyana Altukhova	United Russia

Party lists
Member	Party
~~Maria Kostyuk~~	United Russia
Svetlana Lukash	United Russia
Olga Zhilina	United Russia
Aleksandr Ramazanov	United Russia
Andrey Reshetko	United Russia
~~Alinberg Ganapolsky~~	United Russia
~~Yevgenia Karpova~~	United Russia
~~Aleksandr Zdor~~	United Russia
~~Nadezhda Grudinina~~	United Russia
~~Konstantin Zemlyanikin~~	United Russia
~~Yulia Tokareva~~	United Russia
~~Olga Tsoi~~	United Russia
~~Polina Loshchilova~~	United Russia
~~Yelena Mukhina~~	United Russia
~~Dmitry Polomoshnov~~	United Russia
~~Darya Mostovaya~~	United Russia
~~Olga Bogdanova~~	United Russia
~~Sergey Maksov~~	United Russia
~~Alyona Krotova~~	United Russia
~~Tatyana Permina~~	United Russia
~~Galina Shchennikova~~	United Russia
~~Oksana Bogomolova~~	United Russia
Seimur Mamedli	United Russia
Yevgeny Konopatkin	Communist Party
Nina Kalyukina	Communist Party
~~Leonid Slutsky~~	Liberal Democratic Party
Vasily Gladkikh	Liberal Democratic Party
Yulia Kharchenko	Party of Direct Democracy
Aleksey Tshchedushnov	A Just Russia

== See also ==
- 2026 Russian regional elections
