= Karelia constituency =

Russian legislative constituency

Karelia single-member constituency
- Constituency of the Russian State Duma

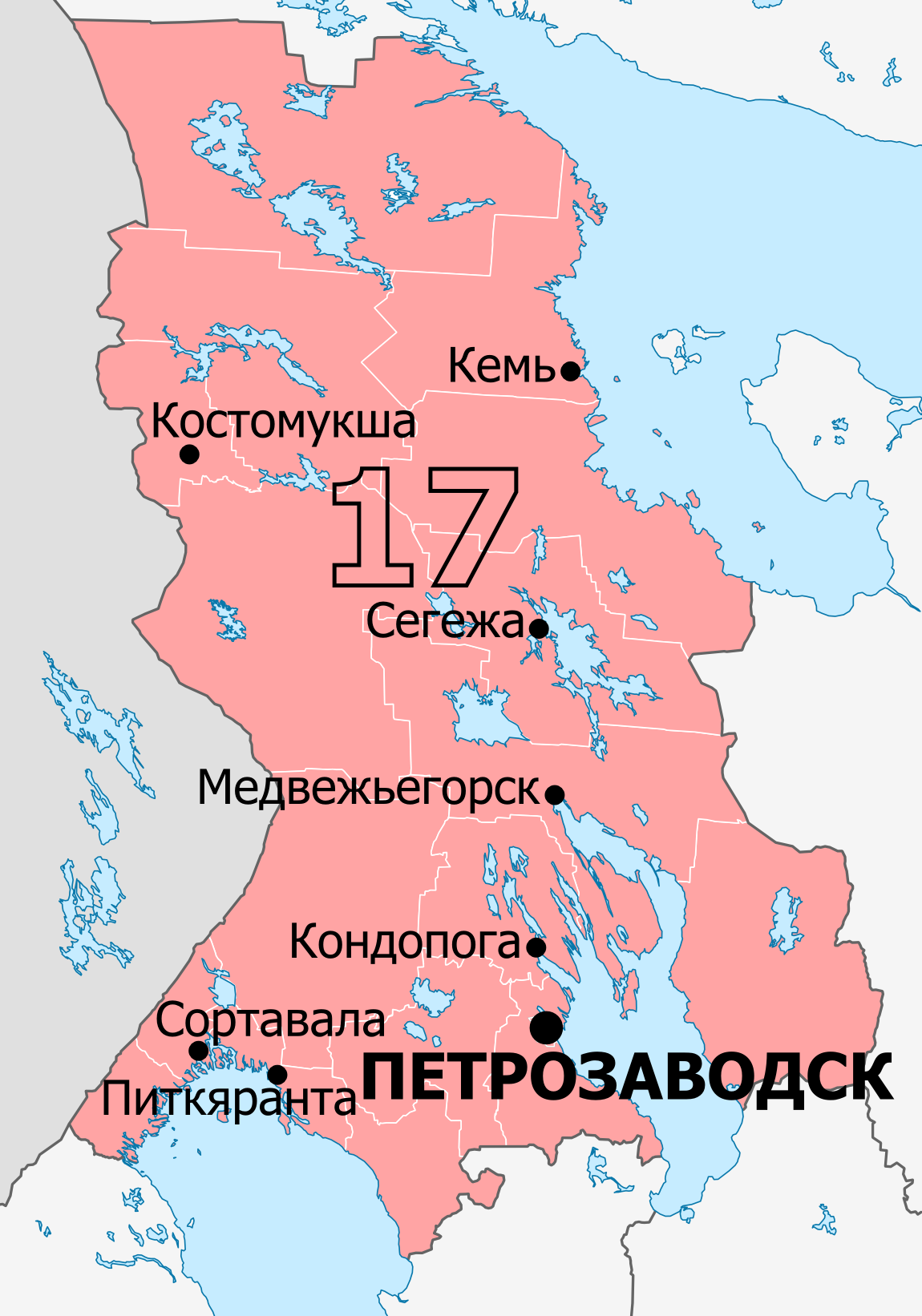
- Deputy: Valentina Pivnenko; United Russia
- Federal subject: Republic of Karelia
- Districts: Belomorsky, Kalevalsky, Kemsky, Kondopozhsky, Kostomuksha, Lakhdenpokhsky, Loukhsky, Medvezhyegorsky, Muyezersky, Olonetsky, Petrozavodsk, Pitkyarantsky, Prionezhsky, Pudozhsky, Pryazhinsky, Segezhsky, Sortavala, Suoyarvsky
- Voters: 497,491 (2026)

The Karelia constituency (No.20 (Note: No.16 in 1995-2003, No.17 in 2016–2026)) is a Russian legislative constituency in the Republic of Karelia. The constituency encompasses the entire territory of Karelia.

The constituency has been represented since 1999 (except for 2007–2016) by United Russia deputy Valentina Pivnenko, a seven-term State Duma member and former union leader.

== Boundaries ==
1993–2007, 2016–present: Belomorsky District, Kalevalsky District, Kemsky District, Kondopozhsky District, Kostomuksha, Lakhdenpokhsky District, Loukhsky District, Medvezhyegorsky District, Muyezersky District, Olonetsky District, Petrozavodsk, Pitkyarantsky District, Prionezhsky District, Pudozhsky District, Pryazhinsky District, Segezhsky District, Sortavala, Suoyarvsky District
The constituency has been covering the entirety of the Karelia since its initial creation in 1993.

== Members elected ==
Election	Member	Party
1993	Ivan Chukhin	Choice of Russia
1995	Larisa Zlobina	Independent
1999	Valentina Pivnenko	Independent
2003	Valentina Pivnenko	United Russia
2007	Proportional representation - no election by constituency	
2011	Proportional representation - no election by constituency	
2016	Valentina Pivnenko	United Russia
2021	Valentina Pivnenko	United Russia
2026	Valentina Pivnenko	United Russia

== Election results ==
=== 1993 ===
==== Declared candidates ====
- Anatoly Anikeyev (Independent), former People's Deputy of Russia (1990–1993), former First Deputy Minister of Internal Affairs of the Russian SFSR (1990–1991), militsiya lieutenant general
- Ivan Chukhin (Choice of Russia), former People's Deputy of Russia (1990–1993), militsiya podpolkovnik
- Alfred Sieppi (YaBL), physics lecturer

==== Results ====
Summary of the 12 December 1993 Russian legislative election in the Karelia constituency
Candidate	Party	Votes	%
Ivan Chukhin	Choice of Russia	112,803	36.98%
Anatoly Anikeyev	Independent	–	21.20%
Alfred Sieppi	Yavlinsky–Boldyrev–Lukin	–	–
Total		305,015	100%

=== 1995 ===
==== Declared candidates ====
- Anatoly Artemyev (Independent), Minister of Health of Karelia
- Ivan Chukhin (DVR–OD), incumbent Member of State Duma (1994–present)
- Natalya Kotsyuba (NDR), Director of the Federal Department on Insolvency Regional Office (1995–present)
- Nikolay Levin (For the Motherland!), legal counsel
- Mikhail Maksimov (LDPR), coordinator of the party regional office, mechanic
- Sergey Romanenko (Independent), unemployed
- Aleksandr Titov (Independent), Member of Legislative Assembly of the Republic of Karelia (1994–present), former Chairman of the Olonetsky District Executive Committee (1989–1990)
- Boris Tyukov (CPRF), Member of Legislative Assembly of the Republic of Karelia (1994–present)
- Larisa Zlobina (Independent), Member of Legislative Assembly of the Republic of Karelia (1994–present), journalist

==== Results ====
Summary of the 17 December 1995 Russian legislative election in the Karelia constituency
Candidate	Party	Votes	%
Larisa Zlobina	Independent	101,894	28.12%
Natalya Kotsyuba	Our Home – Russia	64,462	17.79%
Boris Tyukov	Communist Party	48,173	13.29%
Ivan Chukhin (incumbent)	Democratic Choice of Russia – United Democrats	34,992	9.66%
Mikhail Maksimov	Liberal Democratic Party	23,321	6.44%
Anatoly Artemyev	Independent	21,749	6.00%
Nikolay Levin	For the Motherland!	13,644	3.76%
Aleksandr Titov	Independent	7,095	1.96%
Sergey Romanenko	Independent	2,875	0.79%
against all		36,970	10.20%
Total		362,391	100%

=== 1999 ===
==== Declared candidates ====
- Aleksandr Chazhengin (Yabloko), Member of Legislative Assembly of the Republic of Karelia (1994–present), 1998 head candidate
- Mikhail Maksimov (LDPR), Member of Legislative Assembly of the Republic of Karelia (1998–present), 1995 candidate for this seat
- Mikhail Mrykhin (KRO-Boldyrev), Member of Legislative Assembly of the Republic of Karelia (1994–present)
- Artur Myaki (SPS), Member of Legislative Assembly of the Republic of Karelia (1998–present)
- Valentina Pivnenko (Independent), Chairwoman of the Legislative Assembly of the Republic of Karelia House of Representatives (1994–present)
- Boris Tyukov (CPRF), former Member of Legislative Assembly of the Republic of Karelia (1994–1998), 1995 candidate for this seat
- Larisa Zlobina (RSP), incumbent Member of State Duma (1996–present), 1998 head candidate

==== Withdrawn candidates ====
- Lyudmila Kryshtaleva (Nikolayev–Fyodorov Bloc)

==== Failed to qualify ====
- Boris Payevshchikov (Independent)

==== Did not file ====
- Boris Anushin (Independent), electrician
- Vladimir Lapshin (Independent)
- Yury Linnik (Independent), writer, cosmist
- Aleksandr Starikov (Independent)

==== Results ====
Summary of the 19 December 1999 Russian legislative election in the Karelia constituency
Candidate	Party	Votes	%
Valentina Pivnenko	Independent	106,371	30.46%
Aleksandr Chazhengin	Yabloko	47,045	13.47%
Artur Myaki	Union of Right Forces	45,818	13.12%
Boris Tyukov	Communist Party	42,489	12.17%
Larisa Zlobina (incumbent)	Russian Socialist Party	27,767	7.95%
Mikhail Maksimov	Liberal Democratic Party	21,580	6.18%
Mikhail Mrykhin	Congress of Russian Communities-Yury Boldyrev Movement	6,661	1.91%
against all		44,582	12.77%
Total		349,224	100%

=== 2003 ===
==== Declared candidates ====
- Aleksey Belyaninov (Independent), Member of Petrozavodsk City Council, nonprofit director
- Vladimir Liminchuk (PVR-RPZh), chairman of the regional consumers union
- Artur Myaki (SPS), Member of State Duma (2000–present), 1999 candidate for this seat, 2002 head candidate
- Irina Petelyayeva (Yabloko), Member of Legislative Assembly of the Republic of Karelia (1998–present), newspaper publisher
- Valentina Pivnenko (United Russia), incumbent Member of State Duma (2000–present), Chairwoman of the Duma Committee on Problems of the North and the Far East (2000–present)
- Viktor Potiyevsky (ORP Rus'), writer, journalist
- Vladimir Shilik (VR–ES), Member of Petrozavodsk City Council, auto businessman
- Boris Tyukov (CPRF), former Member of Legislative Assembly of the Republic of Karelia (1994–1998), 1995 and 1999 candidate for this seat, 2002 head candidate

==== Failed to qualify ====
- Andrey Stepanov (LDPR), aide to State Duma member

==== Did not file ====
- Viktor Alekseyenko (RPT), Member of Segezha City Council, locksmith
- Boris Anushin (KPE), power engineer, 1999 candidate for this seat
- Aleksandr Gelakhov (RPP-PSS), palace of culture commercial director
- Yury Samokhin (PME), pensioner
- Sergey Yaskunov (ROPP), Member of Legislative Assembly of the Republic of Karelia (1998–present)

==== Results ====
Summary of the 7 December 2003 Russian legislative election in the Karelia constituency
Candidate	Party	Votes	%
Valentina Pivnenko (incumbent)	United Russia	150,521	50.44%
Irina Petelyayeva	Yabloko	52,198	17.49%
Artur Myaki	Union of Right Forces	30,589	10.25%
Boris Tyukov	Communist Party	17,911	6.00%
Aleksey Belyaninov	Independent	8,399	2.81%
Viktor Potiyevsky	United Russian Party Rus'	2,312	0.77%
Vladimir Shilik	Great Russia – Eurasian Union	1,972	0.66%
Vladimir Liminchuk	Party of Russia's Rebirth-Russian Party of Life	1,947	0.65%
against all		28,723	9.62%
Total		298,683	100%

=== 2016 ===
==== Declared candidates ====
- Mikhail Bynkov (The Greens), nonprofit executive
- Yelena Gnyotova (Party of Growth), Commissioner for Entrepreneurs' Rights in Karelia (2013–present)
- Boris Kashin (CPRF), Member of State Duma (2007–present)
- Natalia Kiselene (Yabloko), agriculture executive
- Aleksey Malevanny (GP), former Member of Petrozavodsk City Council (2004–2011), businessman
- Irina Petelyayeva (A Just Russia), Member of State Duma (2016–present), 2003 Yabloko candidate for this seat
- Valentina Pivnenko (United Russia), Member of State Duma (2000–present)
- Igor Prokhorov (Patriots of Russia), former Minister of Internal Affairs of Karelia (1990–1994), Russian Police major general
- Nikolay Tarakanov (Rodina), former Member of Petrozavodsk City Council (2004–2007), businessman
- Timur Zornyakov (LDPR), Member of Legislative Assembly of the Republic of Karelia (2011–present), retired FSB podpolkovnik

==== Withdrawn candidates ====
- Vladimir Kertsev (CPCR), perennial candidate

==== Did not file ====
- Vladimir Lapshin (Independent), pensioner, 1999 candidate for this seat

==== Declined ====
- Grigory Fandeyev (United Russia), former Member of Legislative Assembly of the Republic of Karelia (2006–2011) (lost the primary)
- Yevgenia Medvedeva (United Russia), Member of Legislative Assembly of the Republic of Karelia (2011–present), 2006 Olympic Champion cross-country skier (lost the primary, ran on the party list)
- Elissan Shandalovich (United Russia), Member of Legislative Assembly of the Republic of Karelia (2011–present), chief doctor of the republican hospital (lost the primary, ran on the party list)
- Larisa Zhdanova (United Russia), Member of Legislative Assembly of the Republic of Karelia (2006–present) (lost the primary)

==== Results ====
Summary of the 18 September 2016 Russian legislative election in the Karelia constituency
Candidate	Party	Votes	%
Valentina Pivnenko	United Russia	77,653	36.56%
Irina Petelyayeva	A Just Russia	37,118	17.48%
Boris Kashin	Communist Party	24,369	11.47%
Timur Zornyakov	Liberal Democratic Party	21,776	10.25%
Natalia Kiselene	Yabloko	18,983	8.94%
Nikolay Tarakanov	Rodina	5,009	2.36%
Yelena Gnyotova	Party of Growth	4,996	2.35%
Igor Prokhorov	Patriots of Russia	4,572	2.15%
Mikhail Bynkov	The Greens	3,883	1.83%
Aleksey Malevanny	Civic Platform	2,338	1.10%
Total		212,376	100%

=== 2021 ===
==== Declared candidates ====
- Denis Bazankov (RPSS), television executive, journalist
- Aleksandr Chazhengin (RPPSS), former First Deputy Head of the Republic of Karelia (2012–2013), 1998 head candidate, 1999 Yabloko candidate for this seat
- Ivan Kadayas (Rodina), tour guide
- Vladimir Kvanin (New People), businessman
- Aleksandr Pakkuyev (LDPR), Member of Matrosy Council (2018–present), aide to State Duma member Igor Lebedev
- Valentina Pivnenko (United Russia), incumbent Member of State Duma (2000–present)
- Anna Pozdnyakova (Party of Growth), former Member of Legislative Assembly of the Republic of Karelia (2011–2016), mining executive
- Emilia Slabunova (Yabloko), Member of Legislative Assembly of the Republic of Karelia (2011–present), former chairwoman of the Yabloko party (2015–2019)
- Viktor Stepanov (SR–ZP), Member of Legislative Assembly of the Republic of Karelia (2006–present), former Head of the Republic of Karelia (1994–1998)
- Yevgeny Ulyanov (CPRF), Member of Legislative Assembly of the Republic of Karelia (2016–present), 2017 head candidate

==== Declined ====
- Anna Lopatkina (United Russia), Member of Legislative Assembly of the Republic of Karelia (2016–present) (lost the primary, ran on the party list)
- Elissan Shandalovich (United Russia), Chairman of the Legislative Assembly of the Republic of Karelia (2016–present), Member of the Legislative Assembly (2011–present) (lost the primary)

==== Results ====
Summary of the 17-19 September 2021 Russian legislative election in the Karelia constituency
Candidate	Party	Votes	%
Valentina Pivnenko (incumbent)	United Russia	55,677	27.69%
Emilia Slabunova	Yabloko	29,751	14.79%
Yevgeny Ulyanov	Communist Party	26,368	13.11%
Viktor Stepanov	A Just Russia — For Truth	25,858	12.86%
Aleksandr Chazhengin	Party of Pensioners	12,947	6.44%
Aleksandr Pakkuyev	Liberal Democratic Party	10,555	5.25%
Vladimir Kvanin	New People	10,122	5.03%
Anna Pozdnyakova	Party of Growth	8,956	4.45%
Denis Bazankov	Russian Party of Freedom and Justice	7,951	3.95%
Ivan Kadayas	Rodina	2,105	1.05%
Total		201,105	100%

=== 2026 ===
==== Declared candidates ====
- Aleksandr Chazhengin (New People), former First Deputy Head of the Republic of Karelia (2012–2013), 1998 head candidate, 1999 Yabloko and 2021 RPPSS candidate for this seat
- Gleb Chubukov (PPD), marketing specialist
- Grigory Fandeyev (RPPSS), former Deputy Minister of National and Regional Policy of Karelia (2017–2025), former Member of Legislative Assembly of the Republic of Karelia (2006–2011)
- Aleksey Glushkov (The Greens), former Member of Petrozavodsk City Council (2006–2011), volunteer rescuer
- Roine Izyumov (A Just Russia), Member of Legislative Assembly of the Republic of Karelia (2021–present)
- Andrey Monastyrshin (CPRF), Member of Legislative Assembly of the Republic of Karelia (2021–present)
- Anna Pavlova (Yabloko), paralegal
- Valentina Pivnenko (United Russia), incumbent Member of State Duma (2000–present)
- Anna Pozdnyakova (LDPR), former Member of Legislative Assembly of the Republic of Karelia (2011–2016), 2021 Party of Growth candidate for this seat
- Aleksey Samolyotov (CPCR), municipal housing utilities executive
- Dmitry Titov (Rodina), nonprofit chairman

==== Results ====
Summary of the 18-20 September 2026 Russian legislative election in the Karelia constituency
Candidate	Party	Votes	%
Valentina Pivnenko (incumbent)	United Russia	52,919	24.77%
Roine Izyumov	A Just Russia	41,187	19.28%
Anna Pozdnyakova	Liberal Democratic Party	23,334	10.92%
Andrey Monastyrshin	Communist Party	22,013	10.30%
Anna Pavlova	Yabloko	18,269	8.55%
Aleksandr Chazhengin	New People	16,236	7.60%
Grigory Fandeyev	Party of Pensioners	10,870	5.09%
Aleksey Glushkov	The Greens	8,669	4.06%
Aleksey Samolyotov	Communists of Russia	6,841	3.20%
Dmitry Titov	Rodina	2,933	1.37%
Gleb Chubukov	Party of Direct Democracy	2,094	0.98%
Total		213,639	100%
