= Karakol =

Karakol Каракол
- City
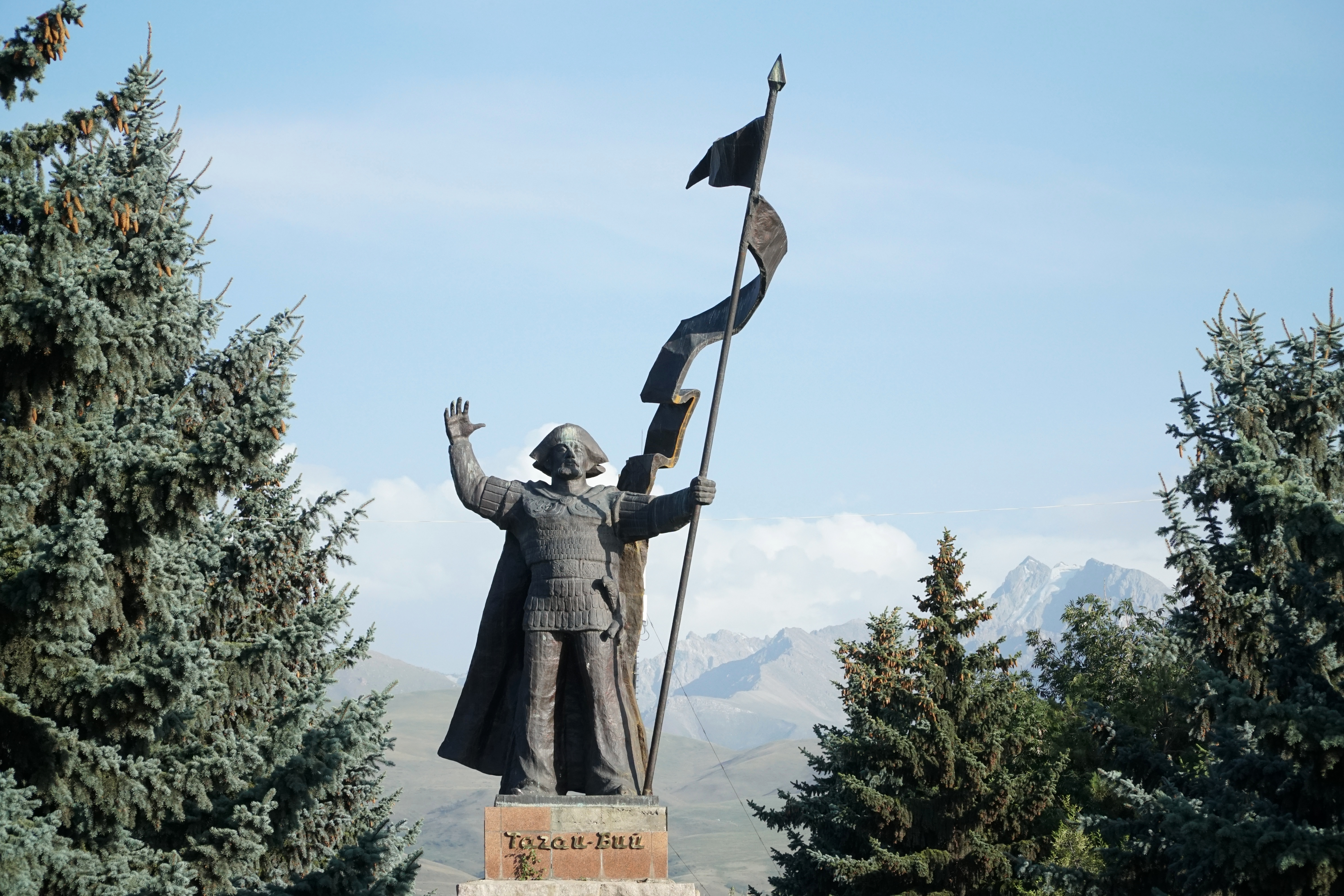
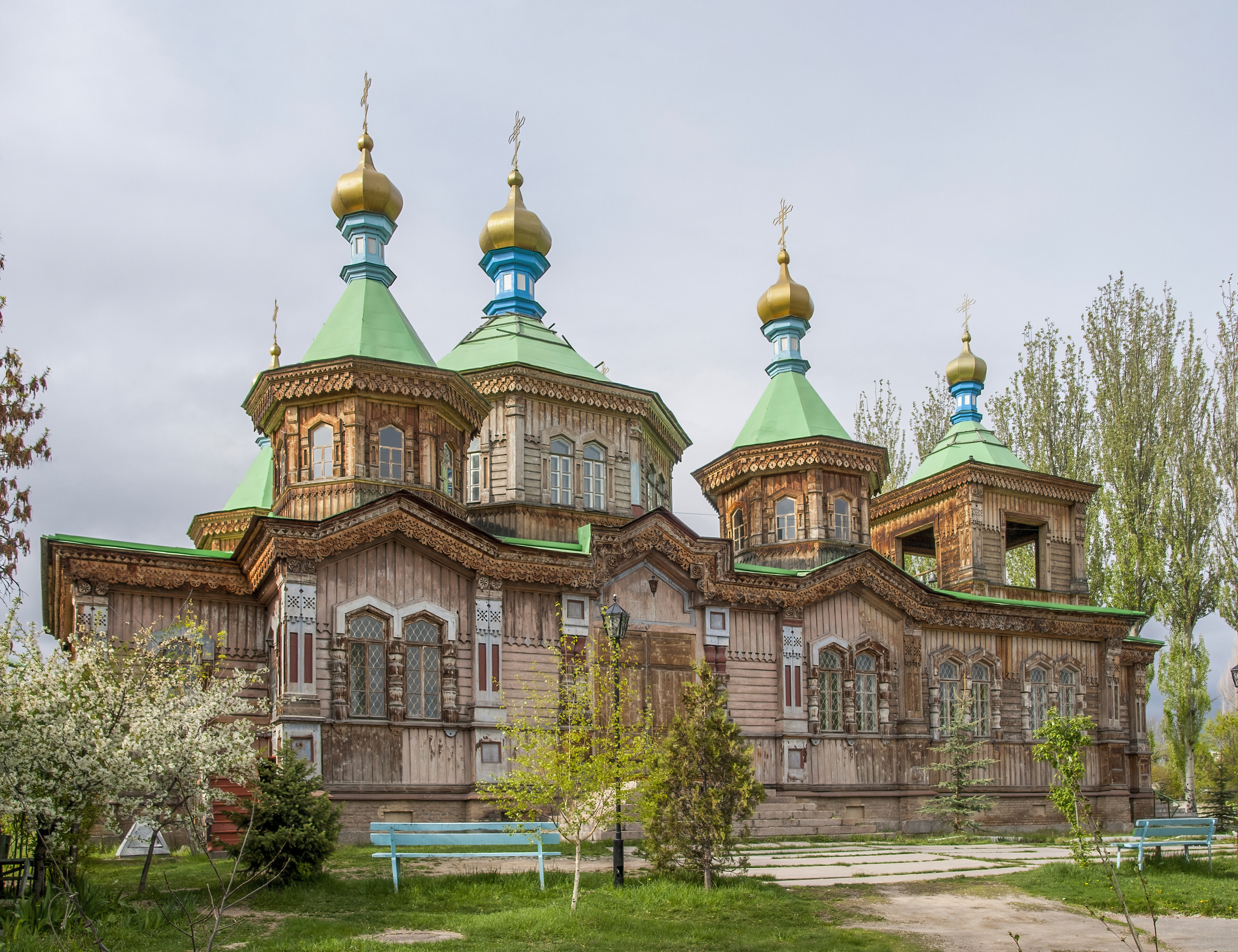
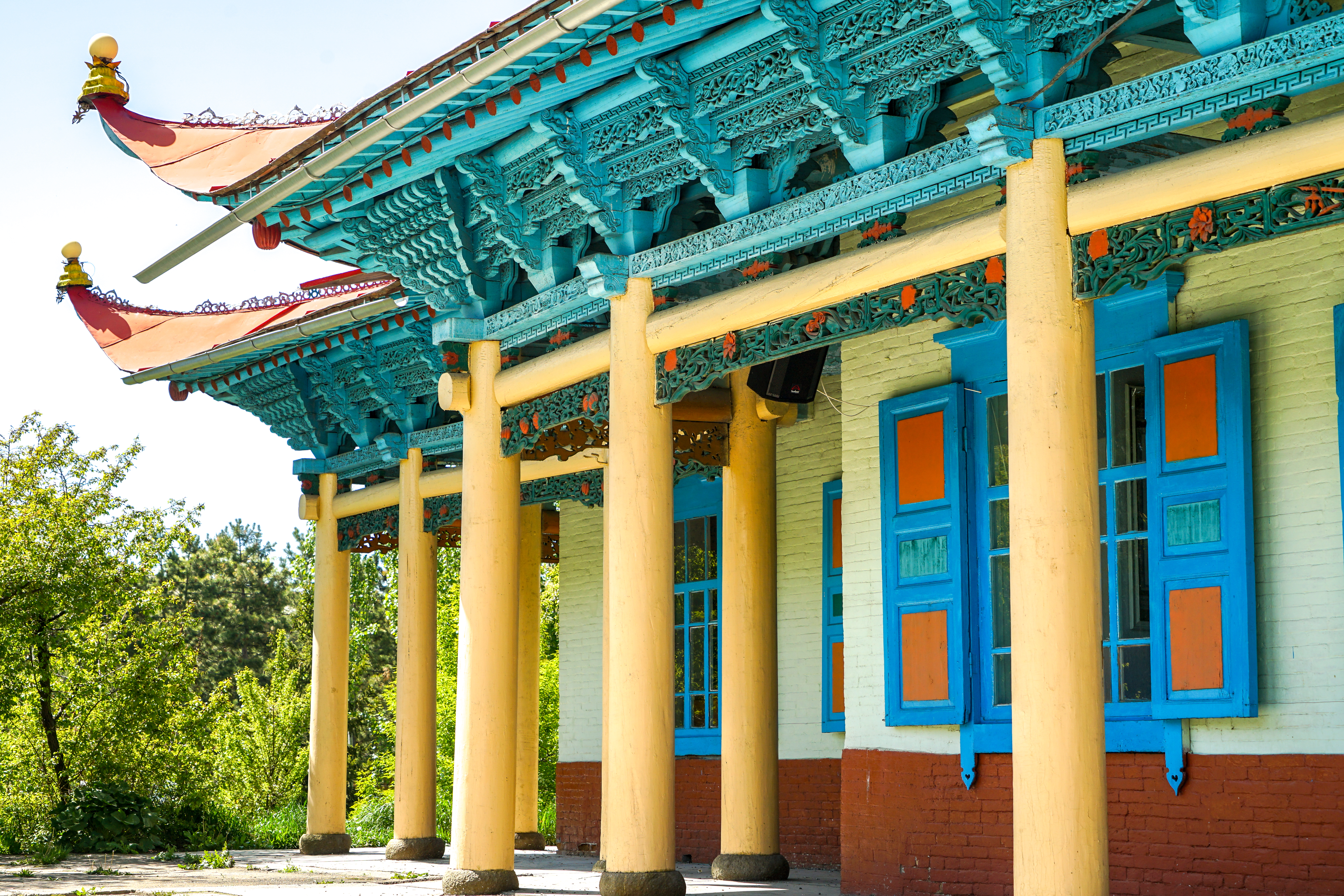
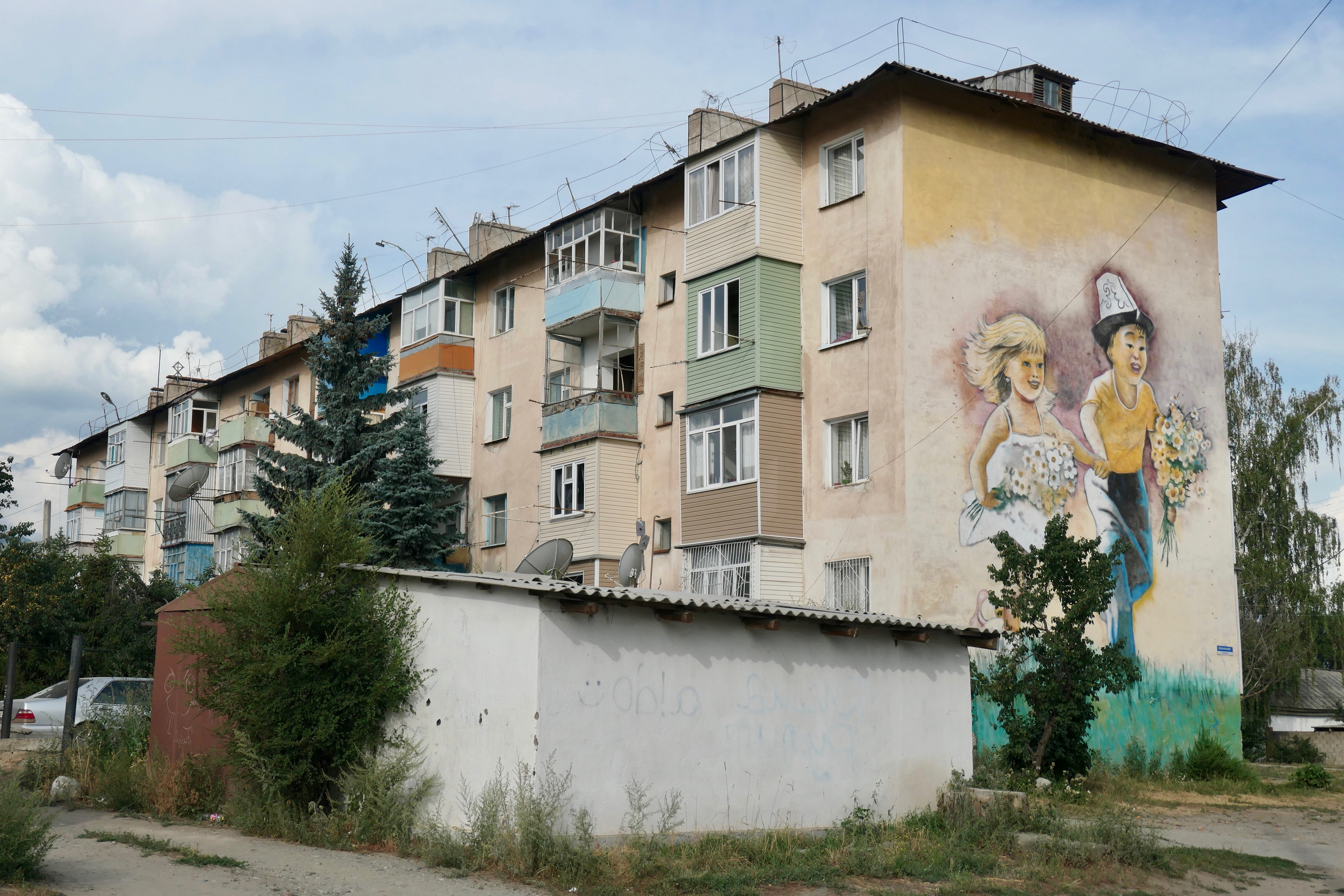
- From the top to bottom-right, Panoramic view of Karakol, Tagay-Biy Statue, Holy Trinity Church, Dungan Mosque, Apartment Buildings

- Flag Coat of arms

- Location in Kyrgyzstan
- Coordinates: 42°29′25″N 78°23′30″E
- Country: Kyrgyzstan
- Region: Issyk-Kul Region

Area
  - Total: 44 km^{2} (17 sq mi)
- Elevation: 1,745 m (5,724 ft)

Population (2021)
  - Total: 84,351
  - Density: 1,900/km^{2} (5,000/sq mi)
- Time zone: UTC+06:00 (KGT)
- Postal code: 722200
- Website: https://www.karakol.com.kg/

Karakol, (Note: /ˌkærəˈkoʊl/ karr-ə-KOHL; Kyrgyz: Каракол, IPA: [qɑɾɑˈqoɫ]; Kazakh: Қарақол, romanized: Qaraqol, IPA: [qʰɑrɑqʰóɫ]; Tatar: Каракул, romanized: Qaraqul, IPA: [qɒrɒˈqʊɫ]; Mongolian: Харгол, romanized: Khargol, IPA: [χárqɔ̆ɮ]; Uzbek: Қорақўл, romanized: Qoraqoʻl, IPA: [qɒrɐˈqol]; Uyghur: قاراقول, romanized: Qaraqol, cyrillized: Қарақол, IPA: [qɑɾɑˈqoɫ]; simplified Chinese: 卡拉科尔; traditional Chinese: 卡拉科爾; pinyin: Kǎlākēr; Dungan: Калакәр) formerly Przhevalsk, (Note: Russian: Пржевальск, romanized: Prževaljsk, IPA: [pr̩ʐɨˈvalʲsk]) is the fourth-largest city in Kyrgyzstan, near the eastern tip of Issyk-Kul, about 150 kilometres (93 mi) from the Kyrgyzstan–China border and 380 kilometres (240 mi) from the capital Bishkek. It is the administrative capital of Issyk-Kul Region. Its area is 44 square kilometres (17 sq mi), and its resident population was 84,351 in 2021 (both including Pristan-Przhevalsk). To the north, on highway A363, is Tüp, and to the southwest Jeti-Ögüz resort.

== History ==
After the defeat of the Dzungar Khanate by Qing China in 1758, eastern Kyrgyzstan did not formally become part of the Qing dynasty but instead declared independence. The border line was designated naturally south of the Issyk-Kul along the Tien Shan mountains.

In the 1820s and the 1830s, the Khanate of Kokand carried out trade and military expansions into Kyrgyzstan, during which campaigns against Naryn and Issyk-Kul were organised. In 1832 small fortifications were erected on the shore of Lake Issyk-Kul. Each fortress housed garrison of 40 to 60 Uzbek troops, who guarded trade caravans and assisted officials in collecting taxes. Administratively, Karakol and the entire Issyk-Kul Region were governed under Tashkent.

In 1843 ethnic Kyrgyz of Karakol rebelled against the Khanate of Kokand, expelling officials from fortifications on the Karakol, Barskon, and Kongur-Olen rivers – after this, the Kyrgyz of Karakol and surrounding regions declared their independence. By 1857 the Russian Empire conducted military expansions in the region. By 1865 the first Russian settlement was officially established in Karakol and surrounding areas.

On 1 July 1869, a Russian military outpost was founded in Karakol, after explorers came to map the peaks and valleys separating Kyrgyzstan from China. In the 1880s, Karakol's population surged with an influx of Dungans (i.e. Hui Muslims) fleeing warfare in China. A small influx of Koryo-saram also arrived into the region.

In 1877 Qing China retook the territory as a result of the Muslim revolt in 1864. According to Austro-Hungarian explorer Károly Újfalvy von Mezőkövesd, 447 inhabitants had been living there. Later that winter, a stream of Dungan, Kazakh, and Uyghur refugees crossed the border into Russia-controlled Kyrgyzstan. 1,130 Dungans were settled in the village of Yrdyk (where they were allocated a plot of land) and Karakol. Many Dungans and Koryo-saram, as well as Kazakhs and Uyghurs, intermarried with local Kyrgyz in eastern Kyrgyzstan.

Until 1887 mostly adobe houses were built in Karakol, but after the 1887 Verny earthquake, the city began to be built predominantly with wooden houses with porches decorated with carvings. In the 1880s, Yaroslav Korolkov founded a weather station in the city. Among the first residents of Karakol were the Tatars, which included merchants like Hamza Abduvaliev—the grandfather of writer Chingiz Aitmatov.

In 1888 Russian explorer Nikolay Przhevalsky died in Karakol of typhoid, while preparing for an expedition to Tibet. By the order of Tsar Alexander III on 23 March 1889 the city was renamed Przhevalsk in the explorer's honor. After local protests, the town was given its original name back in 1921 — a decision reversed in 1939 by Stalin to celebrate the centenary of the explorer's birth. Karakol then remained Przhevalsk until the demise of the Soviet Union in 1991. However the name has been retained by nearby Pristan-Przhevalsk.

Nearby Issyk Kul Lake was used by the Soviet military as a testing site for torpedo propulsion and guidance systems and Karakol was thus home to a sizable population of military personnel and their families. Karakol continues to be a major hub for visitors of Issyk Kul Lake.

== Demographics ==
Karakol is the fourth largest city in Kyrgyzstan after Bishkek, Osh and Jalal-Abad. The resident population of Karakol, as of 2021, was 84,351, of which 2,829 in Pristan'-Przheval'sk. The largest ethnic minority groups in Karakol are Russians (17.0%, 2009 census) and Uyghurs (3.9%).

Historical populations in Karakol
Year	Pop.	±% p.a.
1897	8,108	—
1907	13,948	+5.57%
1926	13,366	−0.22%
1939	21,193	+3.61%
1959	32,565	+2.17%
1970	45,048	+2.99%
1979	54,083	+2.05%
1989	65,407	+1.92%
1999	67,721	+0.35%
2009	66,924	−0.12%
2021	84,351	+1.95%

== Geography ==
=== Climate ===
Karakol features a humid continental climate (Dfb) according to the Köppen climate classification.

Climate data for Karakol
Month	Jan	Feb	Mar	Apr	May	Jun	Jul	Aug	Sep	Oct	Nov	Dec	Year
Mean daily maximum °C (°F)	−4.7 (23.5)	−2.9 (26.8)	4.8 (40.6)	14.0 (57.2)	18.9 (66.0)	23.1 (73.6)	25.5 (77.9)	25.0 (77.0)	20.2 (68.4)	12.7 (54.9)	3.4 (38.1)	−2.3 (27.9)	11.5 (52.7)
Daily mean °C (°F)	−10.4 (13.3)	−8.5 (16.7)	−0.5 (31.1)	7.8 (46.0)	12.8 (55.0)	16.7 (62.1)	19.0 (66.2)	18.2 (64.8)	13.4 (56.1)	6.4 (43.5)	−1.9 (28.6)	−7.6 (18.3)	5.5 (41.8)
Mean daily minimum °C (°F)	−16.1 (3.0)	−14.0 (6.8)	−5.8 (21.6)	1.7 (35.1)	6.8 (44.2)	10.4 (50.7)	12.5 (54.5)	11.4 (52.5)	6.7 (44.1)	0.1 (32.2)	−7.1 (19.2)	−12.9 (8.8)	−0.5 (31.1)
Average precipitation mm (inches)	12 (0.5)	14 (0.6)	23 (0.9)	39 (1.5)	55 (2.2)	54 (2.1)	57 (2.2)	55 (2.2)	39 (1.5)	31 (1.2)	20 (0.8)	14 (0.6)	413 (16.3)
Average relative humidity (%)	69.4	69.6	59.4	46.6	47.2	45.0	43.0	41.2	42.5	49.6	58.7	68.7	53.4
Source 1: Weatherbase (humidity)
Source 2: Climate-Data.org (temp & precip)

== Symbols of Karakol ==
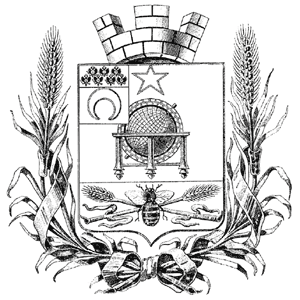
Coat of arms of Przhevalsk 1908

The coat of arms of the city of Przhevalsk was approved by the highest on March 19, 1908 —

In a black shield is a silver globe with a golden meridian and a stand, accompanied on top by a golden star with five rays. In the golden ends of the shield, scarlet ears are placed two crosswise, burdened in coverage with a natural bee. In the free part of the emblem of the Semirechensk region. The shield is crowned with a silver three-pronged tower crown and surrounded by two golden ears of corn, combined with the Alexander ribbon.

— Complete collection of laws of the Russian Empire

The modern coat of arms and flag of the city of Karakol were approved as a result of the competition for the creation of symbols of the city (coat of arms, flag and anthem), organized in March 2007 by the city council and the mayor's office of the city. The main composition of the coat of arms and the flag consists of elements of the sun and the head of a deer with horns (symbols of the Buğu tribe).

== Sights ==
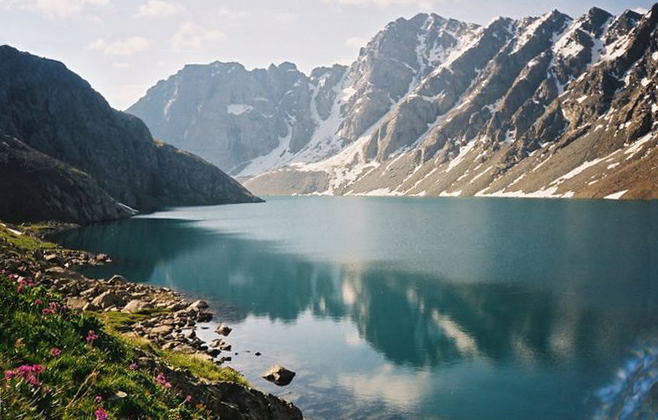
Teskei Alatoo

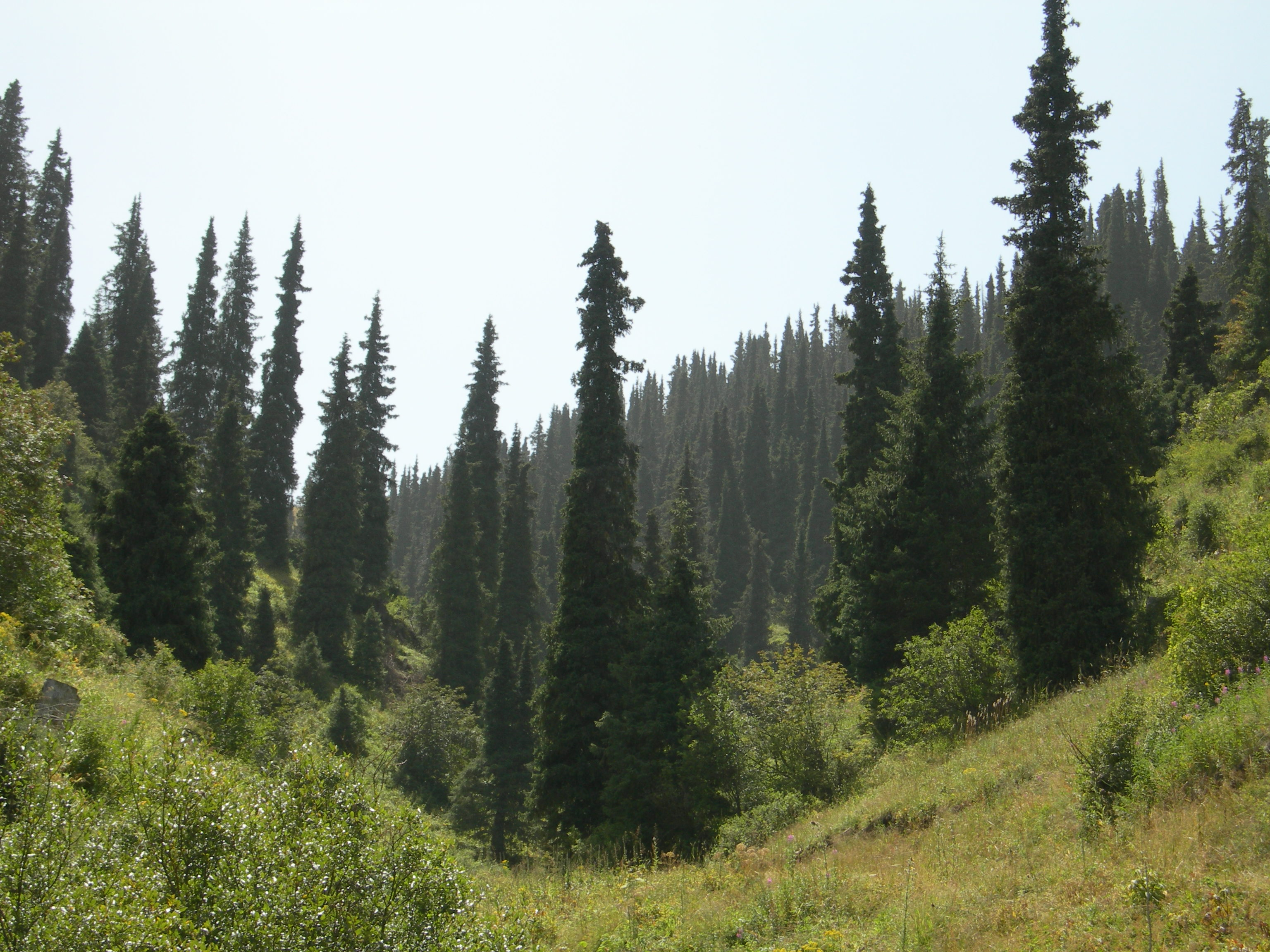
Karakol gorge

Karakol is one of Kyrgyzstan's major tourist hubs, serving as a starting point for the hiking, trekking, skiing and mountaineering groups of the high central Tian Shan to the south and east. Additionally, the city is quite culturally-rich, with several distinct ethnic groups present, such as Dungans, Kalmyks, Russians, Uyghurs, Uzbeks, and of course the local Kyrgyz.

Przhevalsky’s Grave is a memorial park and small museum dedicated to Przhevalsky and others’ Russian explorations in Central Asia, located about 9 kilometres (5.6 mi) north of Karakol at Pristan'-Przheval'sk, overlooking the Mikhailovka Inlet of Issyk Kul lake. This is also where former Soviet torpedo testing facilities are located. Facilities themselves are a closed, government-accessible only area.

Karakol has Central Asia's highest ski resort, with 20 km of slopes, situated about 20 minutes from the town. Unlike Shymbulak resort, the riding at Karakol includes forest areas as well as cleared trails.

=== Russian Orthodox cathedral ===
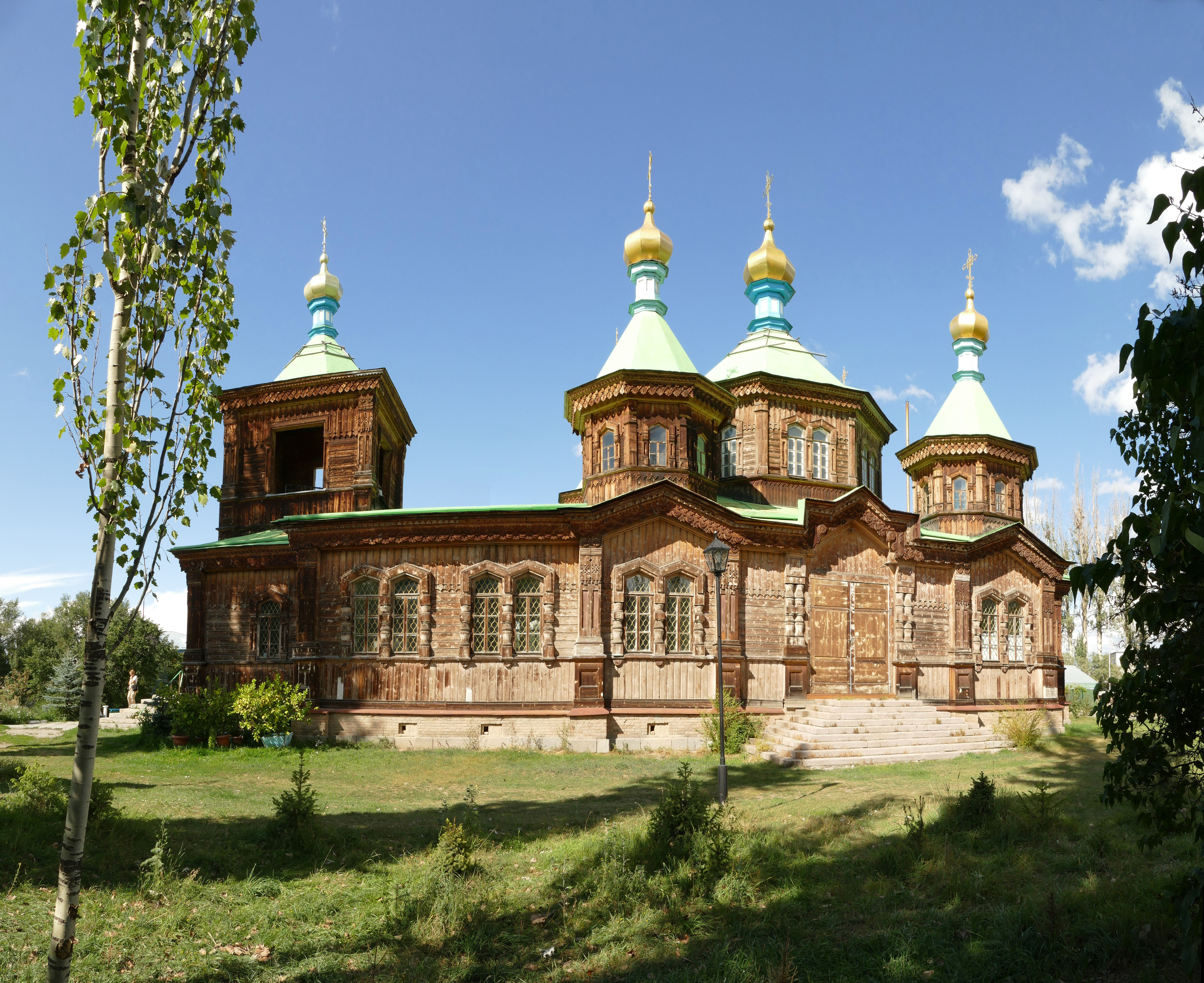
Karakol Russian Orthodox church

The cathedral was originally built of stone, in 1872, when Karakol was a garrison town established as an outpost on the edges of the Tsarist Russian Empire. It was destroyed in 1890 by earthquake, and the current cathedral was subsequently built of wood on a brick base. It took nearly six years to complete, and was finally done in 1895. During the period of construction, a yurt served the congregation as a church. The building has seen considerable usage, and not only as a church, being used for an anti-Russian uprising in 1916, during which several monks were brutally murdered.

Over the years, particularly following the Revolution in 1917, the church has been used as an educational center, at times housing a school, ladies' gymnasium, an institution of higher education, a sports venue, a theatre, a dance hall, and even a coal store. Then, in 1991 (following the collapse of the Soviet Union and the independence of Kyrgyzstan), the local authorities again gave the building back to the Church, whom assumed responsibility for all future remodeling and structural endeavors.

=== Dungan mosque ===
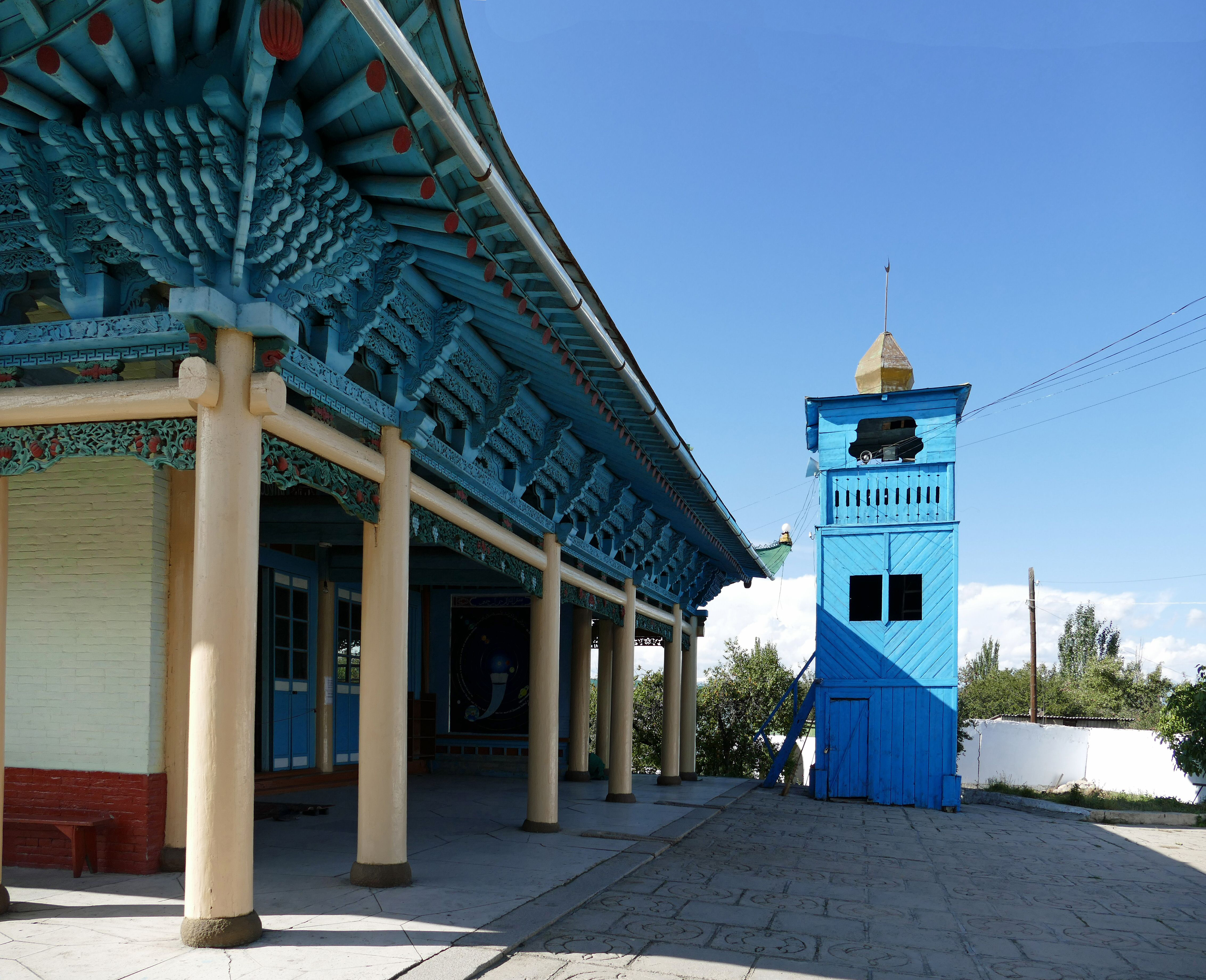
Karakol Dungan Mosque

The Issyk-kul Central Mosque of Karakol was built for the local Dungan community through an initiative of Ibrahim Aji in the early 20th century. Aji commissioned the famed Beijing architect Chou Seu, along with 20 workers (all skilled in traditional Chinese architecture), with building the mosque. The construction of outbuildings, among other projects, involved local craftsmen. Construction of the mosque itself began in 1904, lasting through 1910. Ingenious techniques allowed the builders to construct the mosque without using nails. The building holds 42 based pillars; encircling the building is a multi-tiered wooden cornice, decorated with botanical and natural images such as grapes, pomegranates, pears and peaches. From 1929 to 1947 (during the Soviet era), the mosque was used mainly as a storehouse. In 1947, the building was given to the city’s Muslim community, from whence it has continued to function as a mosque ever since. It is registered as a historical monument and protected by law. Today, the mosque is also open to visitors domestic and foreign.

=== Przhevalsky Museum ===
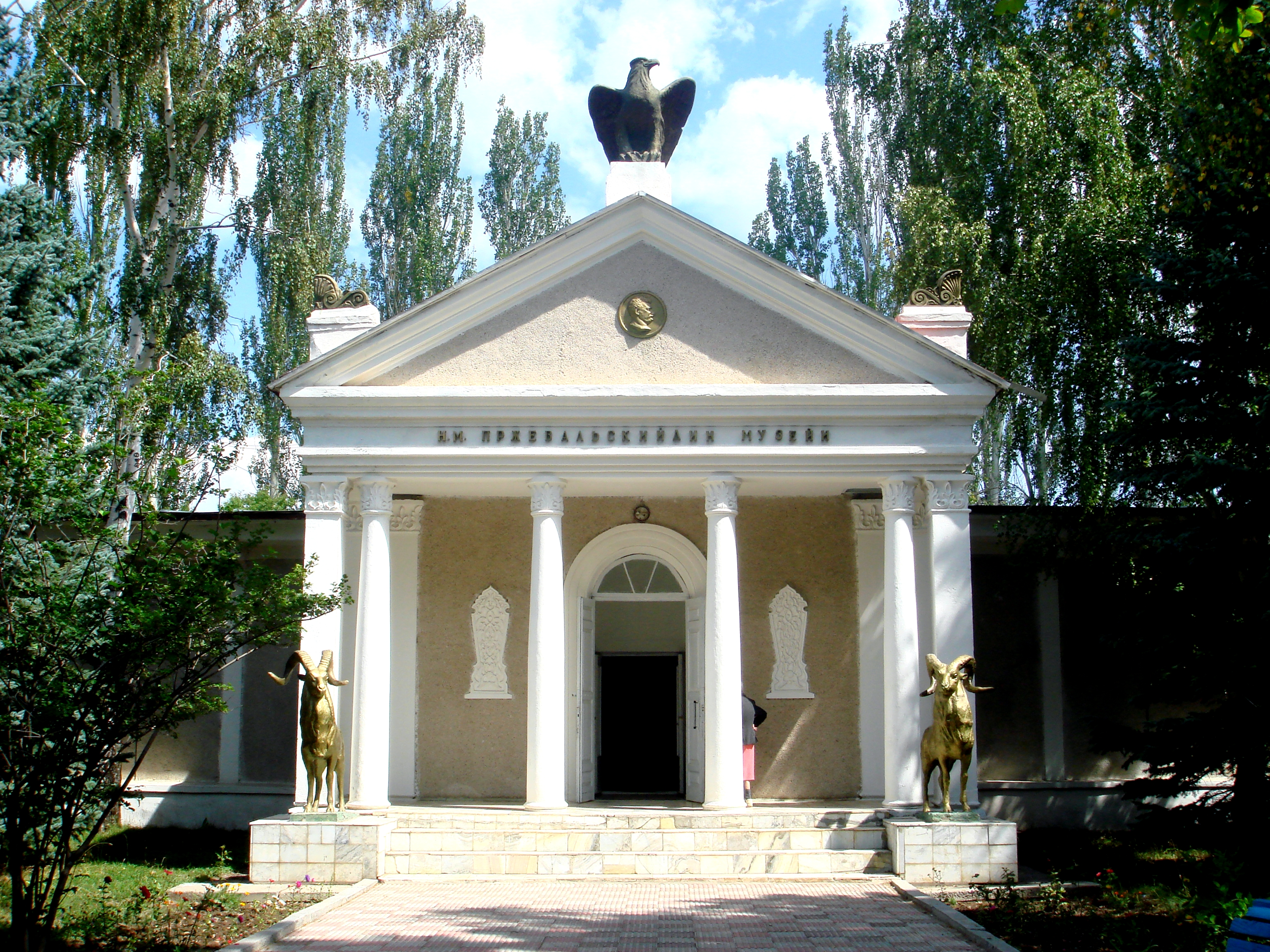
Przhevalsky museum

Nikolay Przhevalsky was one of the first Russian scientists, naturalists and geographers to commence detailed studies of the geography, flora and fauna of the Central Asian countries. Beginning in 1870, he arranged four large expeditions through Mongolia, China and Tibet. During these trips, he revealed the exact coordinates of the mountain ranges and borders of the Tibetan Himalayas and Tian Shan ranges. He described in-detail the weather, relief, ecosystems, flora and fauna in the territories under his study; he described over 200 plant species. While on these expeditions, Przhevalsky also collected an enormous zoological collection, comprising several thousand species of plants, fungi, mammals, reptiles, amphibians, birds, fishes and invertebrates. In 1888, he died from typhoid fever on the eve of his fifth expedition to Central Asia; he was buried on the Issyk-Kul lakeside, not far from the city of Karakol. The Memorial Museum of N. M. Przhevalsky was opened on 29 April 1957 in Karakol.

=== Bugu-Ene Zoo ===
Karakol Zoological Park was founded in 1987, and remains the only zoo in Kyrgyzstan.

=== Animal market ===
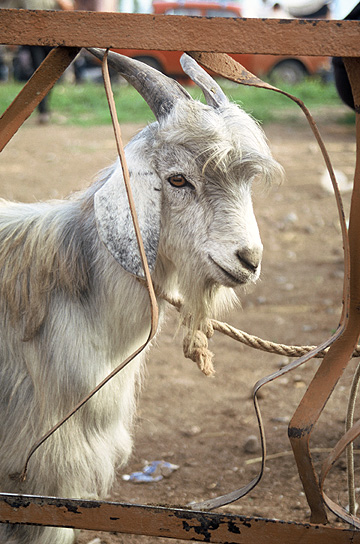
A Kyrgyz goat at the Karakol animal market

On early Sunday mornings, one of Kyrgyzstan's biggest farmer's markets and live animal auctions takes place, around 2 km north of central Karakol, with locals loading livestock in and out of the backs of sedans not being an uncommon sight. The setting is valued for its space.

== Sister cities ==
- Asheville, North Carolina, United States
- Gebze, Kocaeli, Turkey
- Azerbaijan, Gabala
