= Pristan =

Pristan may refer to:

- Pristan'-Przheval'sk, village in the Issyk Kul Province of Kyrgyzstan
- Rudnaya Pristan, village at the mouth of the Rudnaya River on the Pacific coast of Primorsky Krai
- Ust-Charyshskaya Pristan, village and administrative center of Ust-Pristansky District of Altai Krai, Russia
- Pristan (air base), also known as Romanovka West, a former Soviet Naval airfield in Primorsky Krai
