= Valentina Pivnenko =

Russian politician

- Валентина Пивненко
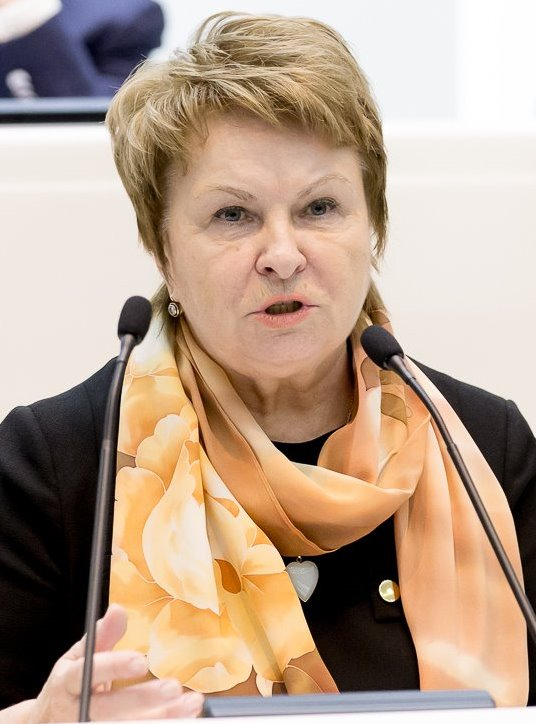
- Pivnenko in 2015

Member of the State Duma
- Incumbent
- Assumed office 5 October 2016
- Preceded by: constituency re-established
- In office 19 December 1999 – 24 December 2007
- Preceded by: Larisa Zlobina
- Succeeded by: constituency abolished
- Constituency: Karelia-at-large (No. 17)

Member of the State Duma (Party List Seat)
- In office 24 December 2007 – 5 October 2016

Chairwoman of the Chamber of Representatives of the Legislative Assembly of Karelia
- In office 17 May 1994 – February 2000

Personal details
- Born: Valentina Nikolayevna Vasilyeva; 14 June 1947 (age 79) Petrozavodsk, Karelo-Finnish SSR, Soviet Union
- Party: United Russia

Valentina Nikolayevna Pivnenko (Russian: Валентина Николаевна Пивненко; born 14 June 1947) is a Russian United Russia politician and states person. She has served in the Russian State Duma as a representative for the Karelia constituency since December 1999, firstly as an independent candidate before joining United Russia in 2000. Before that, Pivnenko was an elected member of the House of Representatives of the Legislative Assembly of the Republic of Karelia as a representative of the Prionezhsky constituency between April 1994 and February 2000. She served two terms in the Russian Federation Council as a senator for the Republic of Karelia from 1996 to 2000. Pivnenko has received many accolades during her political career.

== Biography ==
On 14 June 1947, Pivnenko was born in Petrozavodsk, then part of the Karelian Autonomous Soviet Socialist Republic (today the Republic of Karelia). She was the daughter of Second World War soldier Nikolai Mikhailovich Vasiliev, who died half a year before Pivnenko was born. This meant Pivnenko was raised solely by her mother. Following her graduation from secondary school, he was an employee of the Petrozavodusk State Timber Industry Technical Secondary School, which she worked at between 1966 and 1971. In 1971, Pivnenko was employed as a technician and engineer at Petrozavodsk and Prionezhskiy chemical forestry enterprises. That same year, she became a member of the Communist Party of the Soviet Union (CPSU), and was appointed All-Union Leninist Young Communist League of Petrozavodsk's Prionezhsky district committee's sector head.

Pivnenko was promoted to lead the labour and wages department of the Petrozavodsk timber industry enterprise in 1975. Following her graduation from Petrozavodsk State University in 1978, she took up work as a trade unionist the following year. Pivnenko was appointed secretary of the Karelian Oblast Committee of Trade Union Workers, a role she maintained until 1984. She was elected the trade union's chair and served as such from April 1992 to June 1994 as well as leading its department of wages and work production between 1984 and 1992. In August 1991, Pivnenko left the CPSU. She graduated in absentia from the Moscow Academy of Labour and Social Relations with an economic science degree in 1994.

In both April 1994 and April 1998, Pivnenko was elected to the House of Representatives of the Legislative Assembly of the Republic of Karelia as a representative of the Prionezhsky constituency in the first and second convocations. She was appointed the House of Representatives' President on the 17th of the following month and she was re-elected to the position in May 1998. Pivnenko was appointed to the Russian Federation Council as a senator of the Republic of Karelia in January 1996 and remained there until March 1997 when her term as a Karelian deputy had concluded. From July 1998 to 16 February 2000, she served a second term in the Federation Council, again representing the Karelia Republic. Pivnenko was deputy chair of the Committee on Budget, Tax Policy, Financial, Currency and Customs Regulation and Banking and led an interim commission to investigate Russia's government and the Central Bank of Russia on restricting state short-term liabilities, devaluing the ruble's exchange rate, introducing a ban on foreign exchange transactions of a capital nature.

In 1999, she decided to run as an independent candidate during that year's election to the State Duma. Pivnenko won 30.46 per cent of the popular vote and she was elected to represent the Karelia constituency in the State Duma from 19 December 1999 onwards. The following year, she joined the United Russia party. Pivnenko was head of the Committee on the Problems of the North and the Far East and was one of presidential candidate Vladimir Putin's confidantes. She was appointed chair of the North of Russia inter-factional group in October 2000 and she led the Karelian regional branch of the People's Party of the Russian Federation from 2001 to 2003.

Pivnenko was added to United Russia's Baltic-Belomorskaya regional group in September 2003 so she could stand for election to the fourth convocation of the State Duma at the 2003 Russian legislative election. She was re-elected to serve the Karelia constituency with 50.43 per cent of the popular vote on 7 December 2003. During the 2007 Russian legislative election on 2 December that year, Pivnenko won re-election this time as a deputy in the same constituency for the fifth convocation of the State Duma. She won her fourth re-election to the Karelia constituency this time to the State Duma's fifth convocation during the 2011 Russian legislative election held on 4 December that year. Pivnenko became the State Duma's first deputy chair on the Committee on Regional Policy and Problems of the North and the Far East.

She was the first with a 46.91 per cent vote share in United Russia's preliminary internal party voting held in May 2016 for candidates to stand for election to represent the Karelia Republic in the State Duma at the 2016 Russian legislative election that occurred on 18 September 2016. Pivenko won reelection with a popular vote share of 36.56 per cent and was again appointed first deputy chair of the Committee on Regional Policy and Problems of the North and the Far East. She won re-election to the State Duma for the sixth time when she was elected with 27.69 per cent of the vote share at the 2021 Russian legislative election on 19 September of that year. Pivnenko was appointed Chair of the State Duma Committee for the Development of the Far East and the Arctic on 12 October 2021.

Between 1995 and 1997, she served as a member of the Council for Local Self-Government under the President of Russia and National Council for Pension Reform setup by the Russian president from 2001 to 2004.

=== Sanctions ===
She was sanctioned by the UK government in 2022 in relation to the Russo-Ukrainian War.

== Personal life ==
Pivnenko has been married to the railway worker Rudolf Pivnenko for more than half a century and the couple have two children.

== Awards ==
In 1997, she was appointed Honored Worker of the National Economy of the Republic of Karelia. Pivnenko earned the Laureate of the Year of the Republic of Karelia in late December 1998 "for a great personal contribution to the socio-economic development of the republic and fruitful social and political activities." She was decorated with the Order of Friendship by Putin in May 2001 for "her great contribution to the strengthening of friendship and cooperation between peoples and active legislative activity". Pivnenko was further honoured with the Order of Honour in 2006 "for active participation in legislative activities and many years of conscientious work."

That same year, she received the Order of the Holy Equal-to-the-Apostles Princess Olga "in consideration of helping the Church of the Sign of the Mother of God at Sheremetev Court". Pivnenko received the Order "For Merit to the Fatherland", Fourth Class in July 2012 "for a great contribution to the development of Russian parliamentarism and active participation in lawmaking." She has also been honoured with the Jubilee Medal "300 Years of the Russian Navy", the Medal "In Commemoration of the 850th Anniversary of Moscow", the Medal "For Labour Valour" and the Medal "Veteran of Labour". Pivnenko is also a laureate of the American Biographical Institute's International Woman of the Year Award and has received a gratitude from the Russian Government in 2019.
