= Valentin Skresanov =

Russian politician (born 1931)

- Валентин Скресанов

Member of the Legislative Assembly of the Republic of Karelia
- In office 26 April 1998 – 26 April 2002
- Constituency: Pudozhsky District

Personal details
- Born: 24 January 1931 (age 95) Vologda Oblast, Russian SFSR, USSR
- Party: CPRF
- Profession: Politician, engineer

Valentin Mikhailovich Skresanov (Russian: Валентин Михайлович Скресанов; born 24 January 1931) is a Russian engineer and politician who served as a member of the Legislative Assembly of the Republic of Karelia from 1998 to 2002.

He also served as the First Secretary of the Pudozhsky District Committee of the CPSU from 1972 to 1985.
