= Roman Boyko =

Russian politician (born 1977)

- Роман Бойко
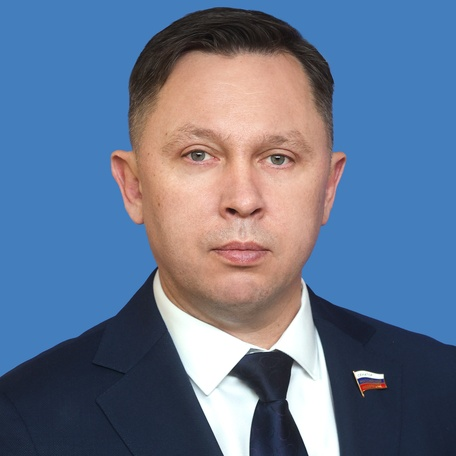
- Official portrait, 2025

Chairman of the Legislative Assembly of the Jewish Autonomous Oblast
- In office 21 September 2021 – October 2026
- Preceded by: Lyubov Pavlova
- Succeeded by: Svetlana Lukash

Personal details
- Born: 11 May 1977 (age 49) Pristan'-Przheval'sk, Kirghiz SSR, Soviet Union
- Citizenship: Russia
- Party: United Russia
- Education: Amur State Medical Academy
- Awards: Medal "For Life Saving"

Roman Stepanovich Boyko (Russian: Роман Степанович Бойко, born 11 May 1977) is a Russian politician. He is the chairperson of the Legislative Assembly of the Jewish Autonomous Oblast of the Russian Federation.

== Biography ==
Boyko graduated from the Amur State Medical Academy in 2000, specializing in "General Medicine". In 2001, he began working as an intern at the Sakhalin Regional Hospital. That same year, he was appointed to the position of surgeon at the Konstantinovskaya Central District Hospital, where he worked for six years.

In 2007, he transferred to serve in the Ministry of Emergency Situations, first in the Amur Region, then in the Khabarovsk Territory. From 2010 to 2014, he headed the medical protection service of the Far Eastern Regional Center for Civil Defense, Emergencies, and Elimination of Consequences of Natural Disasters. In 2012, he graduated from the Russian Presidential Academy of National Economy and Public Administration, specializing in "State and Municipal Administration".

In 2014, he was appointed to the position of First Deputy Head of the Main Directorate of the Ministry of Emergency Situations of the Russian Federation for the Jewish Autonomous Region. On June 17, 2016, he was appointed Acting Head of the Main Directorate of the Ministry of Emergency Situations of the Russian Federation for the Jewish Autonomous Region. On June 26 of the same year, he became the head of the Main Directorate of the Ministry of Emergency Situations of Russia for the Jewish Autonomous Region.

In the 2021 election of deputies of the Legislative Assembly of the Jewish Autonomous Oblast of the 7th convocation in the Oktyabrsky single-mandate constituency, he received more than 73% of the votes. On September 29, 2021, he was elected speaker of the Legislative Assembly of the Jewish Autonomous Region by secret ballot. In this post, he replaced Lyubov Pavlova, who had headed the regional parliament since 2016.
