= Party of Direct Democracy =

Party of Direct Democracy Партия прямой демократии
- Abbreviation: PPD
- Leader: Oleg Artamonov
- Founder: Vyacheslav Makarov
- Founded: 5 March 2020
- Registered: 1 April 2020
- Headquarters: Uglovoy Lane 27. 6, Moscow
- Ideology: Direct democracy E-democracy; Big tent
- Political position: Centre to centre-right
- Colours: White; Blue
- Slogan: «Bringing back politics to people» (Russian: «Возвращаем политику людям»)
- Federation Council: 0 / 170
- State Duma: 0 / 450
- Regional Parliaments: 1 / 3,994

Website
- digitaldem.ru

The Party of Direct Democracy (Russian: Партия прямой демократии, romanized: Partiya pryamoy demokratii; PPD), sometimes translated as the Direct Democracy Party, is a registered Russian political party.

== History ==
The creation of the Direct Democracy Party was publicly announced on January 10, 2020; On March 5 of the same year, the founding congress of the Party was held, at which its Charter was adopted, the General Secretary of the Party and the first composition of the Supreme Coordination Council were elected. The party's founder, Vyacheslav Makarov, became the general secretary of the party.

On April 1, 2020, the party was registered by the Ministry of Justice of the Russian Federation.

In November 2020, Vyacheslav Makarov left the post of general secretary, arguing this by the lack of long-term political plans and the implementation of the task of directly launching the party. The head of the scientific and technical expertise of the party, Oleg Artamonov, was elected as the new general secretary at the extraordinary congress.

== Participation in elections ==
On July 11, 2020, the 2nd extraordinary congress of the Direct Democracy Party was held in Moscow, at which candidates were nominated for elections to the legislative assemblies of the Voronezh, Novosibirsk, Kaluga and Ryazan regions, a number of municipalities of the Irkutsk region and district assemblies of Makhachkala, which were held on September 13, 2020, of the year.

During the voting on amendments to the Constitution of the Russian Federation, it turned out to be the only party that nominated experts to monitor the progress of electronic voting in Moscow.

In January 2021, the party's general secretary, Oleg Artamonov, announced that the party would not take part in the elections to the State Duma, focusing on elections to regional parliaments.

In the elections to the Legislative Assembly of the Jewish Autonomous Oblast in 2021, the Party of the Direct Democracy won 5.93% of the vote, winning one seat.

== Ideology ==
The Direct Democracy Party advocates the establishment of direct democracy through digitalization, expanding the capabilities of the application "Gosuslugi" to control the activities of deputies and elected officials, providing residents of municipalities with the opportunity to directly distribute part of the local budget. At the same time, the party refuses to approve any official ideology, since the policy of elected deputies should be determined directly on the ground by voters.

According to the manifesto, the Direct Democracy Party plans to achieve:

- full transparency of the work of all deputies in legislative bodies of all levels in a form convenient for the voter;
- digitalization and algorithmization of actions of officials and government representatives;
- adoption of the law on the recall of deputies;
- expanding the list of elected positions among officials and government representatives, including magistrates in it;
- reducing barriers to holding referendums, as well as organizing a new form of referendum — consultative, which allows to find out the opinion of voters on pressing issues and submit the result for consideration by the relevant legislative authority.;
- division of the budget of municipalities into two parts: general and distributed by citizens.

== Criticism ==
The Direct Democracy Party has often been accused of spoiling. Thus, the head of the "Political Expert Group" Konstantin Kalachev suggested that with the help of the Direct Democracy Party, an attempt to channel the protest of educated and young residents of megacities can be realized. Sergey Starovoitov, General Director of the Club of Regions, suggested that the party uses the political context to promote business projects. Alexander Zhalov, Director of Research at ISEPI, pointed out that the party does not have a meaningful agenda, and it can be created in order to promote electronic voting, and IT corporations participating in this will be able to receive preferences from the state in the future. The online publication Meduza, citing its sources in the Presidential Administration, reported that the party's project was developed in the Kremlin; the founder of the party Vyacheslav Makarov himself denies that the Direct Democracy Party is a project of the federal authorities.

Political scientist, head of the EISI expert Council Gleb Kuznetsov noted that the Direct Democracy Party considers its electorate to be "young people, IT-confused, fans of unconditional progress, people of the Internet, online game players," while this audience is the most skeptical of all possible and is mostly either on spontaneous or on conscious modern left-wing positions that the party does not correspond to, eventually becoming a "spoiler" of the Party of Growth and the liberal wing of United Russia.

== Leaders ==
1. Vyacheslav Makarov, 5 March – 5 December 2020
2. Oleg Artamonov, since 5 December 2020
