= Holy Trinity Church, Karakol =

Holy Trinity Church
- Crkva svetog Nikole; Црква светог Николе
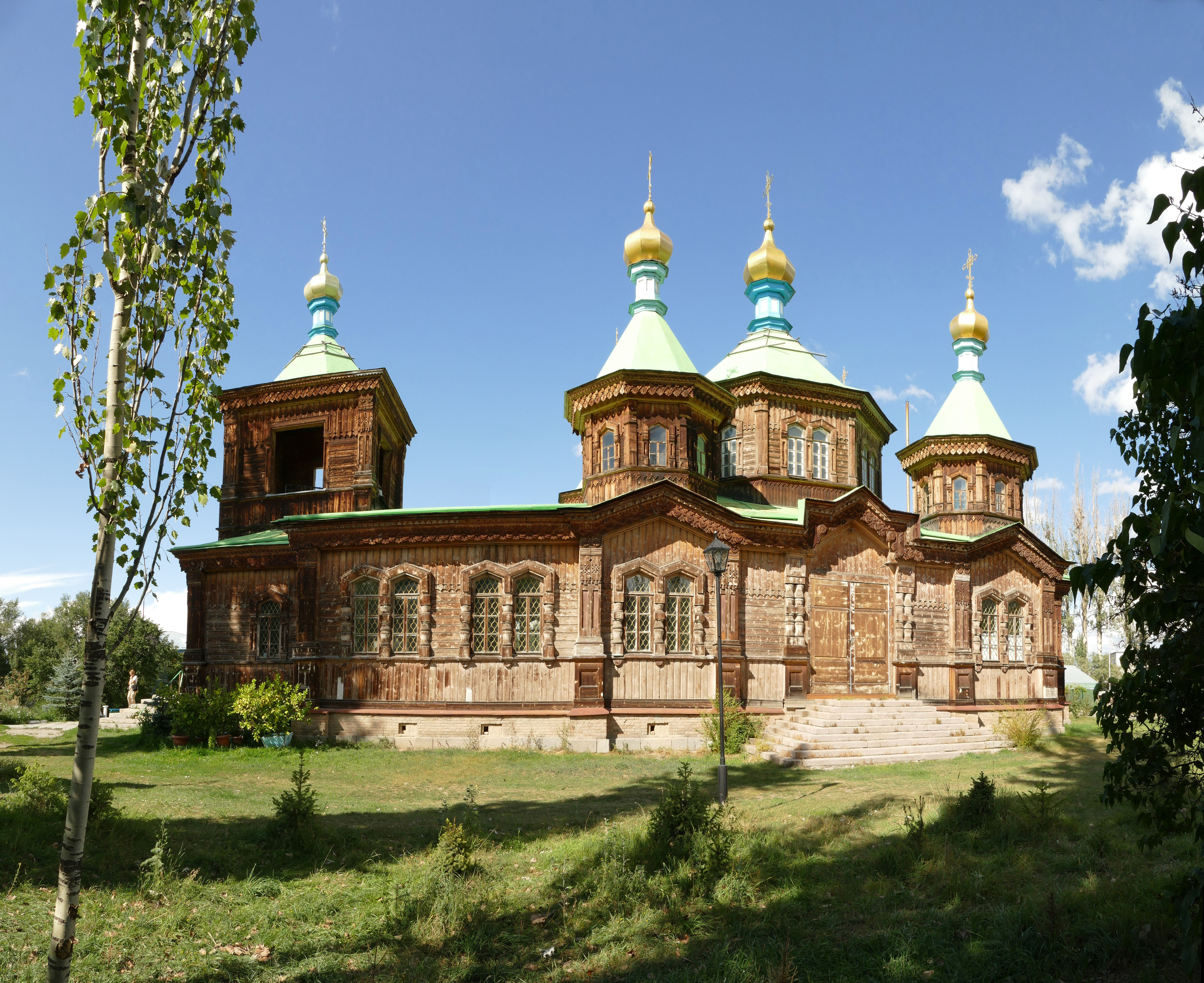
- Holy Trinity Church
- Holy Trinity Church
- Location: Karakol
- Country: Kyrgyzstan
- Denomination: Russian Orthodox

History
- Status: Church
- Dedication: Holy Trinity

Architecture
- Functional status: Active
- Years built: 1895

The Holy Trinity Church (Russian: Свято-Троицкая церковь, Kyrgyz: Улуу Троица чиркөөсү) is a Russian Orthodox wooden church building in Karakol in Kyrgyzstan. The building was constructed between 1894 and 1895, replacing an earlier church that was destroyed by an earthquake. The church is located 12 kilometers from the shores of Issyk-Kul. The church is located at an altitude of 1758 meters above sea level.

== History ==
In the middle of the 19th century, a wave of immigration from Russia and Ukraine brought significant cultural and historical changes to Turkestan. Representatives of the Orthodox clergy, having settled in the area, began to advocate for the establishment of local prayer houses and churches. Wooden churches began to be constructed in Kyrgyzstan due to their increased earthquake resistance.

Established in 1869 as a chapel for military personnel in the garrison town of Karakol, the church was originally a small brick building on stone foundations. In 1889, the original church in Karakol was destroyed by an earthquake, and a new wooden structure was completed in 1895. After its construction, the Holy Trinity Church was the tallest building in Karakol, with the top of the cross reaching about 26 meters. A wooden church was erected by the Maslikov family, based on the design of engineers from Verny (now Almaty).

During its history, particularly after the 1917 Revolution, the church served various secular purposes, including a school, sports hall, theater, and even a coal store. It was briefly returned to religious use in 1947, but by 1961, it was once again secularized. By 1982, the church had been abandoned, but restoration work began in 1986. After the dissolution of the Soviet Union in 1991, the church was returned to the orthodox community, with restoration responsibilities shifted to the church in 1995.
