= 2021 Russian regional elections =

- 17–19 September 2021
- 2021 Russian regional elections: Gubernatorial Legislative Legislative of another region (Note: Yamalo-Nenets Autonomous Okrug is partially subordinated to Tyumen Oblast, thus residents of YaNAO are eligible to vote for Tyumen Oblast Duma this year) Legislative both (Note: Khanty-Mansi Autonomous Okrug is partially subordinated to Tyumen Oblast, thus residents of KhMAO are eligible to vote both for Tyumen Oblast Duma and Duma of KhMAO this year) Gubernatorial and legislative

The 2021 Russian regional elections took place in Russia on Sunday, 19 September 2021 with possibility of voting on 17 and 18 September provided by the electoral authorities. There will be the legislative election for the 8th State Duma, ten gubernatorial elections, 39 regional parliamentary elections, and many elections on the municipal and local level.

== State Duma ==
All 450 seats of the State Duma were up for reelection on September 19.

== Gubernatorial elections ==
=== Khabarovsk Krai ===
Candidate	Party	Votes	%
Mikhail Degtyarev	Liberal Democratic Party	237,818	59.29
Marina Kim	A Just Russia — For Truth	106,532	26.56
Vladimir Parfenov	Party of Pensioners	41,986	10.47
Babek Mamedov	Rodina	14,806	3.69
Total		401,142	100.00
Valid votes		401,142	95.75
Invalid/blank votes		17,790	4.25
Total votes		418,932	100.00
Registered voters/turnout		958,412	43.71
Source: Vybory

=== Ulyanovsk Oblast ===
Candidate	Party	Votes	%
Aleksey Russkikh	Communist Party	366,035	84.91
Gennady Budarin	The Greens	24,199	5.61
Sergey Marinin	Liberal Democratic Party	20,904	4.85
Svetlana Goreva	New People	19,935	4.62
Total		431,073	100.00
Valid votes		431,073	97.94
Invalid/blank votes		9,075	2.06
Total votes		440,148	100.00
Registered voters/turnout		967,259	45.50
Source: Vybory

=== Tula Oblast ===
Candidate	Party	Votes	%
Aleksey Dyumin	Independent	506,816	84.96
Vladimir Isakov	Communist Party	54,371	9.11
Vladimir Rostovtsev	Party of Pensioners	18,519	3.10
Yury Moiseev	Communists of Russia	16,810	2.82
Total		596,516	100.00
Valid votes		596,516	98.37
Invalid/blank votes		9,868	1.63
Total votes		606,384	100.00
Registered voters/turnout		1,150,957	52.69
Source: Vbory

=== Chechnya ===
Candidate	Party	Votes	%
Ramzan Kadyrov	United Russia	711,973	99.73
Isa Khadzhimuradov	A Just Russia — For Truth	1,064	0.15
Khalid Nakaev	Communist Party	835	0.12
Total		713,872	100.00
Valid votes		713,872	99.97
Invalid/blank votes		237	0.03
Total votes		714,109	100.00
Registered voters/turnout		754,790	94.61
Source: Vybory

=== Tver Oblast ===
Candidate	Party	Votes	%
Igor Rudenya	United Russia	225,020	54.55
Lyudmila Vorobyova	Communist Party	86,389	20.94
Dmitry Ignatkov	A Just Russia — For Truth	45,981	11.15
Oleg Gorlov	Liberal Democratic Party	28,022	6.79
Ilya Kleymenov	Communists of Russia	27,089	6.57
Total		412,501	100.00
Valid votes		412,501	95.93
Invalid/blank votes		17,503	4.07
Total votes		430,004	100.00
Registered voters/turnout		1,031,402	41.69
Source: Vybory

=== Tuva ===
Candidate	Party	Votes	%
Vladislav Khovalyg	United Russia	142,159	87.80
Choygana Seden-ool	Communist Party	6,623	4.09
Aylanmaa Kan-ool	The Greens	5,617	3.47
Vladimir Chesnokov	Communists of Russia	4,204	2.60
Andrey Sat	Party of Growth	3,312	2.05
Total		161,915	100.00
Valid votes		161,915	98.87
Invalid/blank votes		1,851	1.13
Total votes		163,766	100.00
Registered voters/turnout		197,874	82.76
Source: Vybory

== Regional legislative elections ==
- 7th State Council of Adygea
- 5th Parliament of the Chechen Republic
- 7th State Council of Chuvashia
- 7th People's Assembly of Dagestan
- 7th People's Assembly of Ingushetia
- 7th Legislative Assembly of Karelia
- 7th State Assembly of Mordovia
- 8th Altai Krai Legislative Assembly (election)
- 4th Legislative Assembly of Kamchatka Krai
- 4th Legislative Assembly of Krasnoyarsk Krai
- 4th Legislative Assembly of Perm Krai
- 7th Legislative Assembly of Primorsky Krai
- 7th Duma of Stavropol Krai
- 8th Legislative Assembly of Amur Oblast
- 7th Duma of Astrakhan Oblast
- 7th Kaliningrad Oblast Duma
- 7th Legislative Assembly of Kirov Oblast
- 7th Kursk Oblast Duma
- 7th Legislative Assembly of Leningrad Oblast
- 7th Lipetsk Oblast Council of Deputies
- 7th Moscow Oblast Duma
- 7th Murmansk Oblast Duma
- 7th Legislative Assembly of Nizhny Novgorod Oblast
- 7th Novgorod Oblast Duma
- 7th Legislative Assembly of Omsk Oblast
- 7th Legislative Assembly of Orenburg Oblast
- 7th Oryol Oblast Council of People's Deputies
- 7th Pskov Oblast Assembly of Deputies
- 7th Samara Regional Duma
- 7th Legislative Assembly of Sverdlovsk Oblast
- 7th Tambov Oblast Duma
- 7th Legislative Assembly of Tver Oblast
- 7th Legislative Duma of Tomsk Oblast
- 7th Tyumen Oblast Duma
- 10th Legislative Assembly of Vologda Oblast
- 7th Legislative Assembly of Saint Petersburg
- 7th Legislative Assembly of the Jewish Autonomous Oblast
- 7th Duma of Khanty-Mansi Autonomous Okrug
- 7th Duma of Chukotka Autonomous Okrug

== Local self-government elections in regional capitals ==
Grozny, Kaliningrad, Kemerovo, Khanty-Mansiysk, Nalchik, Perm, Petrozavodsk, Saransk, Saratov, Stavropol, Ufa.
