= Legislative Assembly of the Jewish Autonomous Oblast =

Regional parliament of the Jewish Autonomous Oblast, Russia

Legislative Assembly of the Jewish Autonomous Oblast Законодательное собрание Еврейской автономной области (Russian)
- 7th legislature

Type
- Type: Unicameral

Leadership
- Chairman: Roman Boyko, United Russia since 29 September 2021

Structure
- Seats: 19
- Political groups: United Russia (14); CPRF (2); LDPR (1); SRZP (1); PPD (1)

Elections
- Voting system: Mixed
- Last election: 19 September 2021
- Next election: 2026

Meeting place
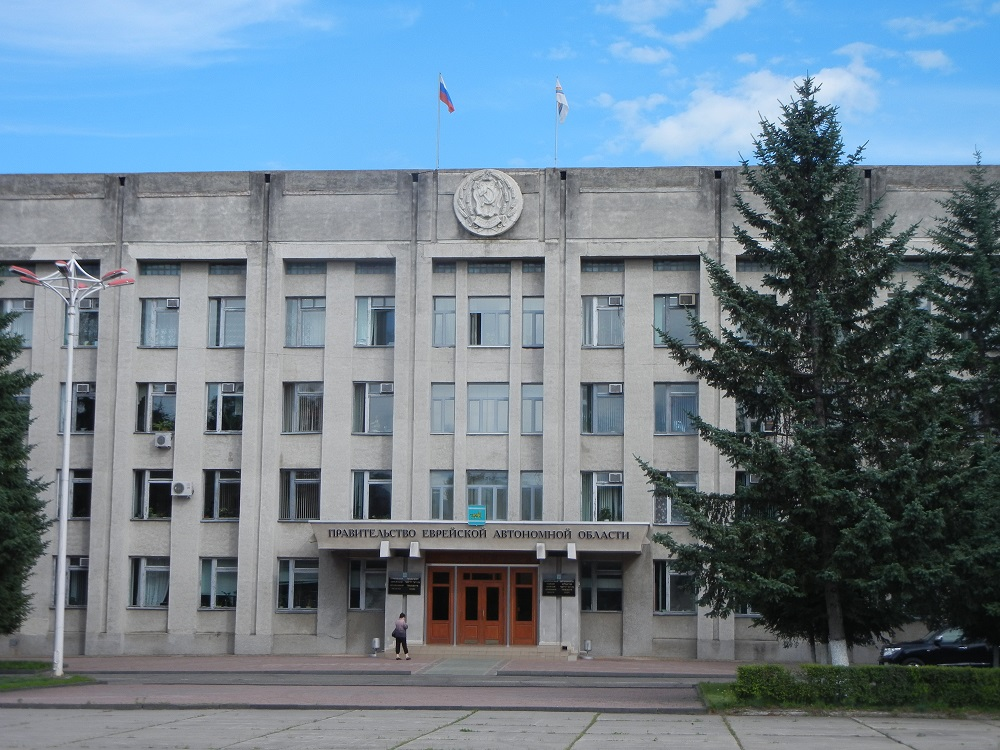
- 18, Prospekt 60-Letiya SSSR, Birobidzhan

Website
- zseao.ru

The Legislative Assembly of the Jewish Autonomous Oblast (Russian: Законодательное собрание Еврейской автономной области; Yiddish: לעגיסלאַטיווע אַסעמבלי פון די אידישע אַוטאָנאָמאָוס קאנט) is the regional parliament of the Jewish Autonomous Oblast, a federal subject of Russia. A total of 19 deputies are elected for five-year terms.

== Elections ==
=== 2021 ===
Party	Single-Member District	Proportional			Seats
Party	Single-Member District	Votes	%	#	Seats
United Russia	9	39 437	51.86	5	14
Communist Party of the Russian Federation	0	14 477	19.04	2	2
Liberal Democratic Party of Russia	0	7 058	9.28	1	1
Party of Direct Democracy	0	4 508	5.93	1	1
A Just Russia — For Truth	0	4 180	5.50	1	1
Total	9			10	19
Registered voters/turnout	62.38 %				

== List of chairpersons ==
- Alexander Skachkov — 1992 to 1994
- Stanislav Vavilov — 1994 to 2001
- Anatoly Tikhomirov — 2001 to 2016
- Lyubov Pavlova — 2016 to 2021
- Roman Boyko — 2021 to present

== Representation in the Federation Council ==
- Gennady Antonov — 1994 to 1996
- Stanislav Vavilov — 1996 to 2007
- Boris Listov — 2007 to 2009
- Vladimir Dzhabarov — 2009 to 2025
- Roman Boyko — 2025 to present
