= List of chairmen of the Legislative Assembly of the Republic of Karelia =

The chairman of the Legislative Assembly of the Republic of Karelia is the presiding officer of that legislature.

It was preceded by the Supreme Soviet.

== Chairman of the Supreme Soviet of the Karelian Autonomous Soviet Socialist Republic (from 1991: The Republic of Karelia) ==
Name	Period
Viktor Stepanov	April 15, 1990–May 17, 1994

1994-2002 the legislature was bicameral.

== Chairmen of the Chamber of the Republic of the Legislative Assembly of the Republic of Karelia ==
Name	Period
Ivan Alexandrov	May 17, 1994–January 17, 1998
Natalia Kotsyuba	April 26, 1998–January 13, 2000
Vladimir Shilnikov	January 13, 2000–May 14, 2002

== Chairmen of the Chamber of Representatives of the Legislative Assembly of the Republic of Karelia ==
Name	Period
Valentina Pivnenko	May 17, 1994–February 2000
Nikolay Levin	February 2000–May 14, 2002

== Chairmen of the Legislative Assembly of the Republic of Karelia ==
Name	Period
Nikolay Levin	May 14, 2002–July 10, 2009
Alexander Pereplesnin	July 10, 2009–December 4, 2011
Vladimir Semenov	December 4, 2011–October 6, 2016
Elissan Shandalovich	October 6, 2016–Present

== Sources ==
- The official website of the Legislative Assembly of the Republic of Karelia
