= Károly Újfalvy von Mezőkövesd =

Hungarian-French ethnographer and linguist (1842–1904)

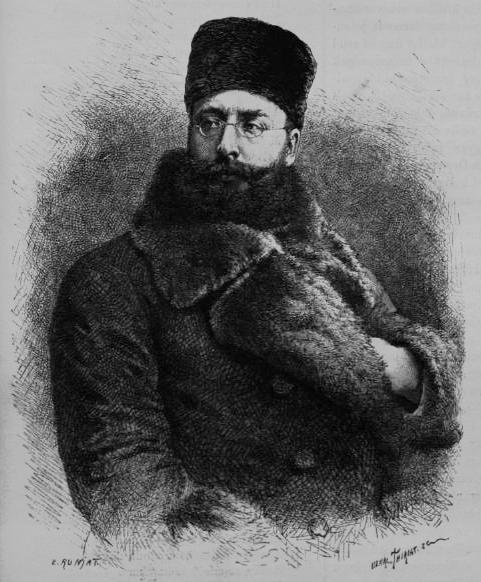
- Born: 16 May 1842; Vienna
- Died: 31 January 1904 (aged 61); Florence
- Occupations: Ethnographer; Linguist

Károly Jenő Ujfalvy de Mezőkövesd (16 May 1842 – 31 January 1904) was a noted Austro-Hungarian ethnographic researcher and linguist. of Central Asia and the Himalayas. Also known as Charles de Ujfalvy in his adopted France, Ujfalvy traveled to Samarkand and Bokhara and led an expedition to Kashmir in 1880.

He was born at Székelykövesd/Cuieşd, in Transylvania, and died at Florence.

Ujfalvy also published under the following names: Mezőkövesdi Ujfalvy Károly Jenő, or Karl Eugen Ujfalvy von Mezőkövesd, Charles-Eugène Ujfalvy de Mezökövesd, or Mező-Kövesd.

== Works ==
- Alfred de Musset, eine Studie von Karl Eugen von Ujfalvy, 1870
- Poésies magyares de Pétoefi Sandor. Traduction par H. Desbordes-Valmore et Ch. E. Ujfalvÿ de Mezö-Kövesd, 1871
- La Langue magyare, son origine, ses rapports avec les langues finnoises ou tchoudes, ses particularités, 1871
- La Hongrie, son histoire, sa langue et sa littérature, 1872
- Les Migrations des peuples et particulièrement celle des Touraniens, 1873
- Poésies magyares, choix et traduction par H. Desbordes-Valmore et Ch. E. de Ujfalvy de Mezö-Kövesd, 1873
- Recherches sur le tableau ethnographique de la Bible et sur les migrations des peuples, 1873
- Aperçu général sur les migrations des peuples et influence capitale exercée sur ces migrations par la race de la Haute-Asie, 1874
- Cours complémentaire de géographie et d'histoire de l'Asie centrale et orientale à l'École spéciale des langues orientales vivantes, leçon d'ouverture, 1874
- Mélanges altaïques, 1874
- Le Pays de Thulé, 1874
- L'Ethnographie de l'Asie, 1875
- Étude comparée des langues ougro-finnoise, 1875
- Grammaire finnoise d'après les principes d'Eurén : suivie d'un recueil de morceaux choisis, 1876
- Éléments de grammaire magyare, 1876
- Principes de phonétique dans la langue finnoise ; suivi d'un essai de traduction d'un fragment du Kalévala, 1876
- Les Chasses en Asie centrale, 1878
- Voyage au Zarafchane, au Ferghanah et à Kouldja, 1878
- Les Bachkirs, les Vêpses et les antiquités finno-ougriennes et altaïques, précédés des résultats anthropologiques d'un voyage en Asie centrale, 1880
- Expédition scientifique française en Russe, en Sibérie et dans le Turkestan, 6 vols., 1878-1880
- L'Art des cuivres anciens au Cachemire et au Petit-Thibet, 1883
- Les Kalmouques, 1883
- Aus dem westlichen Himalaja, 1884
- Le Berceau des Aryas d'après des ouvrages récents, 1884
- Quelques observations sur les Tadjiks des montagnes appelés aussi Galtchas, 1887
- Les Aryens au nord et au sud de l'Hindou-Kouch, 1896
- Mémoire sur les Huns blancs (Ephtalites de l'Asie centrale, Hunas de l'Inde), et sur la déformation de leurs crânes, 1898
- Iconographie et anthropologie irano-indiennes, 1900-1902
- Le Type physique d'Alexandre le Grand d'après les auteurs anciens et les documents iconographiques, 1902
