= Legislative Assembly of the Republic of Karelia =

Regional parliament of Karelia, Russia

Legislative Assembly of the Republic of Karelia Законодательное собрание Республики Карелия (Russian)
- 7th legislature

Type
- Type: Unicameral

Leadership
- Chairman: Elissan Shandalovich, United Russia since 6 October 2021

Structure
- Seats: 36
- Political groups: United Russia (22) CPRF (4); SRZP (4); LDPR (2); Yabloko (2); RPPSJ (1) New People (1)

Elections
- Last election: 19 September 2021
- Next election: 2026

Meeting place
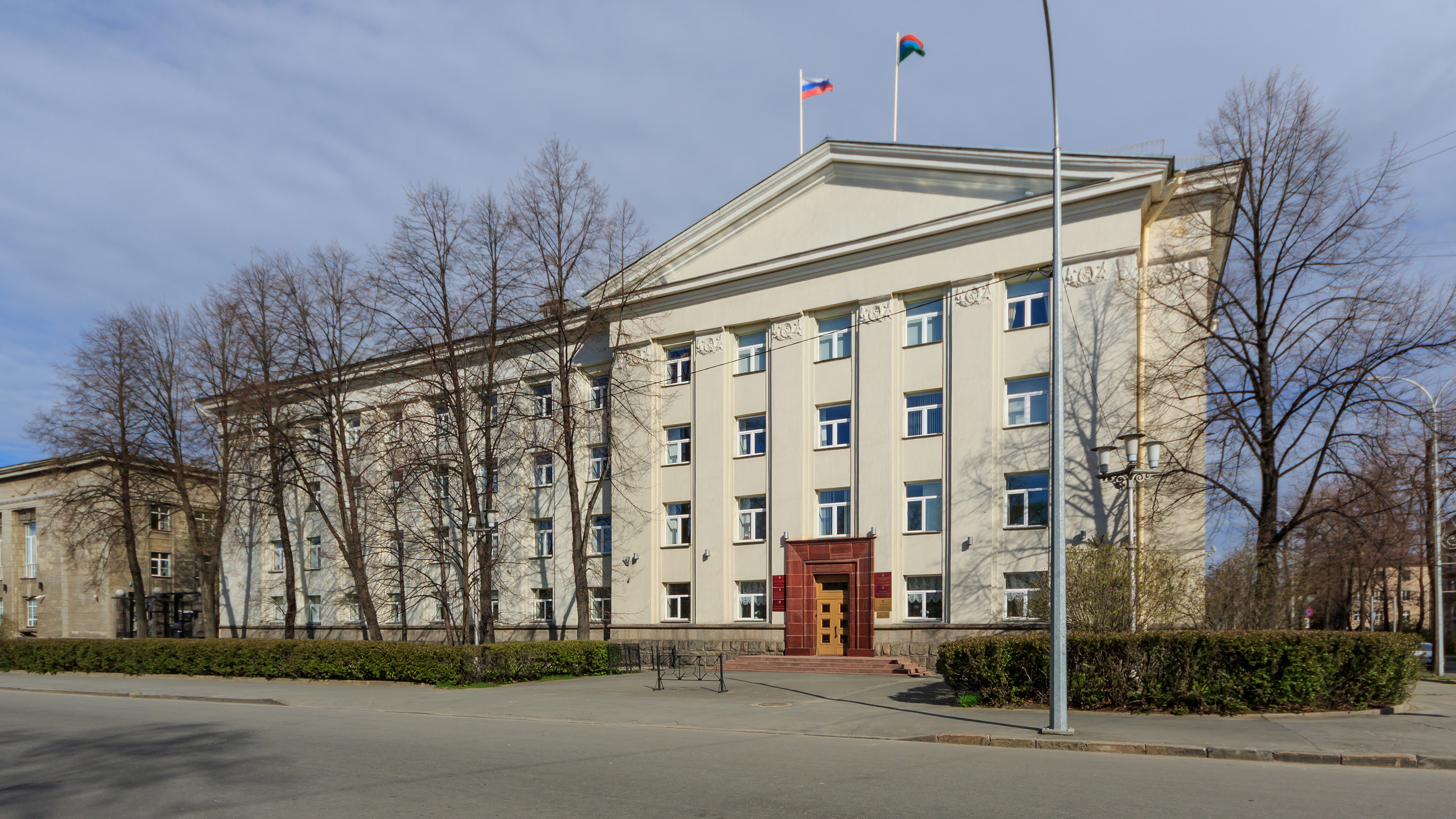
- 5 Kuybysheva Street, Petrozavodsk

Website
- http://www.karelia-zs.ru/

The Legislative Assembly of the Republic of Karelia (Russian: Законодательное собрание Республики Карелия, romanized: Zakonodatel'noye sobraniye Respubliki Kareliya, Karelian: Karjalan tašavallan lakijenhyväkšymiskokouš, Livvi: Karjalan tazavallan zakonoinhyväksyndykerähmö) is the regional parliament of Karelia, a federal subject of Russia.

It consists of 36 deputies who are elected for five-year terms.

Between 1994 and 2002, it was divided into two chambers: the Chamber of Representatives and the Chamber of the Republic.

== History ==
The Legislative Assembly of the Republic of Karelia was established in 1994 as the successor of the Supreme Soviet of the Republic of Karelia.

The Legislative Assembly consisted of two chambers: the Chamber of the Republic and the Chamber of Representatives. Deputies of both chambers were elected for a term of 4 years.

- The Chamber of the Republic consisted of 25 deputies. Deputies were elected in single-mandate constituencies.
- The House of Representatives consisted of 36 deputies. They were elected in multi-member constituencies with a representation standard of two deputies from an electoral district coinciding with the territory of a district.

On March 26, 2000, a referendum on parliamentary reform was held. 69.79% of voters (271,328 people) voted in favor of adopting a unicameral parliament. The changes were adopted in 2001.

In November 2014, the threshold for party lists in elections to the Legislative Assembly was reduced from 7% to 5%.

== Elections ==
=== 2011 ===
Party	%	Seats
United Russia	30.13	19
A Just Russia	22.25	12
Communist Party of the Russian Federation	19.05	8
Liberal Democratic Party of Russia	18.34	5
Yabloko	7.13	4
Self-nominated	—	2
Registered voters/turnout	50.03	

=== 2016 ===
Party	%	Seats (Note: Reduced from 50 seats to 36 seats)
United Russia	33.20	24
Liberal Democratic Party of Russia	18.91	3
A Just Russia	15.54	3
Communist Party of the Russian Federation	14.44	3
Yabloko	9.89	3
Registered voters/turnout	39.41	

=== 2021 ===
Party	%	Seats
United Russia	28.96	22
Communist Party of the Russian Federation	16.91	4
A Just Russia — For Truth	12.81	4
Liberal Democratic Party of Russia	9.86	2
Yabloko	8.54	2
New People	6.35	1
Russian Party of Pensioners for Social Justice	5.60	1
Registered voters/turnout	39.19	

== See also ==
- List of chairmen of the Legislative Assembly of the Republic of Karelia
