= Pristan'-Przheval'sk =

- Interactive map of Pristan'-Przheval'sk
- Location within Kyrgyzstan
- Coordinates: 42°34′8.58″N 78°17′49.06″E
- Country: Kyrgyzstan
- Region: Issyk-Kul
- City: Karakol
- Elevation: 1,621 m (5,318 ft)

Population (2021)
  - Total: 2,829
- Time zone: UTC+6

Pristan'-Przheval'sk is an urban-type settlement in the Issyk-Kul Region of Kyrgyzstan. Administratively, it is part of the city Karakol. The town was named after the Russian geographer, Nikolai Mikhailovich Przhevalsky, who is buried nearby. It lies 12 km north west of Karakol. Its population was 2,829 in 2021.

Kyrgyz and Dungan rebels attacked Przheval'sk during the 1916 Basmachi revolt. This was met by repression and in Przheval'sk 70% of the Kyrgyz died along with 90% of their cattle.

== Population ==
Historical population
| Year | Pop. | ±% p.a. |
|---|---|---|
| 1970 | 3,039 | — |
| 1979 | 3,398 | +1.25% |
| 1989 | 3,886 | +1.35% |
| 1999 | 3,399 | −1.33% |
| 2009 | 2,917 | −1.52% |
| 2021 | 2,829 | −0.25% |
Note: resident population; Sources:
