= Regional parliaments of Russia =

The regional parliaments of Russia are the regional legislatures in the federal subjects of Russia (republics, krais, oblasts, autonomous oblasts and federal cities), which have different names but are often collectively referred to as regional parliaments.

The federal structure of Russia includes 85 regional parliaments. The largest regional parliament is the State Assembly of the Republic of Bashkortostan, which consists of 110 deputies, while the smallest one is the Duma of Chukotka Autonomous Okrug, which consists of 15 deputies. Currently, deputies in the regional parliaments are elected for five-year terms.

== Names ==
Title	Number
Legislative Assembly	31
Regional Duma	22
State Assembly	5
State Council	6
Assembly of Deputies	3
Board of Deputies	1
People's Assembly	3
Khural	3
Parliament	3
Others	8

== Parties in each parliament ==
Data is current as of September 2026.

United Russia holds an absolute majority in all 85 parliaments.

Federal Subject	Seats	Voting System	UR	CPRF	LDPR	SRZP	NP	Other parties	Independent	Last Election	Next election	Website
Republics
Adygea	50	MMM	42	3	3	1	1	0	0	2026	2031	Website
Altai Republic	41	MMM	37	1	2	1	0	0	8	2024	2029	Website
Bashkortostan	110	MMM	87	8	4	5	1	1	4	2023	2028	Website
Buryatia	66	MMM	51	7	2	0	5	0	1	2023	2028	Website
Chechnya	41	Proportional	35	2	2	2	0	0	0	2026	2031	Website
Chuvashia	44	MMM	34	4	1	2	2	1	0	2026	2031	Website
Crimea^{[a]}	75	MMM	68	3	3	1	0	0	0	2024	2029	Website
Dagestan	90	Proportional	69	10	0	11	0	0	0	2026	2031	Website
Donetsk^{[a]}	90		74	6	6	0	4	0	0	2023	2028	Website
Ingushetia	32	Proportional	27	0	2	2	1	0	0	2026	2031	Website
Kabardino-Balkaria	70	Proportional	50	9	2	7	0	2	0	2024	2029	Website
Kalmykia	27	Proportional	23	2	0	1	1	0	0	2023	2028	Website
Karachay-Cherkessia	50	MMM	34	6	2	6	0	2	0	2024	2029	Website
Karelia	36	MMM	21	5	3	4	2	1	0	2026	2031	Website
Khakassia	50	MMM	34	14	2	0	0	0	0	2023	2028	Website
Komi Republic	30	MMM	25	2	1	1	1	0	0	2025	2030	Website
Mari El	52	MMM	48	2	1	0	0	0	0	2024	2029	Website
Mordovia	48	MMM	44	2	2	0	0	0	0	2026	2031	Website
North Ossetia–Alania	70	MMM	51	9	0	10	0	0	0	2022	2027	Website
Sakha	70	MMM	55	4	1	3	6	0	1	2023	2028	Website
Tatarstan	100	MMM	86	6	2	1	2	0	2	2024	2029	Website
Tuva	32	MMM	25	2	1	0	1	0	3	2024	2029	Website
Udmurtia	60	MMM	49	3	4	2	0	1	1	2022	2027	Website
Krais
Altai Krai	68	MMM	51	7	4	2	4	0	0	2026	2031	Website
Kamchatka Krai	28	MMM	24	1	1	1	1	0	0	2026	2031	Website
Khabarovsk Krai	36	MMM	28	1	5	1	1	0	0	2024	2029	Website
Krasnodar Krai	70	MMM	62	2	3	2	0	1	0	2022	2027	Website
Krasnoyarsk Krai	52	MMM	39	6	4	0	3	0	0	2026	2031	Website
Perm Krai	60	MMM	47	5	4	1	3	0	0	2026	2031	Website (Archived)
Primorsky Krai	40	MMM	32	5	1	1	1	0	0	2026	2031	Website
Stavropol Krai	50	MMM	44	3	1	1	1	0	0	2026	2031	Website
Zabaykalsky Krai	50	MMM	42	3	4	1	0	0	0	2023	2028	Website
Oblasts
Amur Oblast	27	MMM	23	1	1	1	1	0	0	2026	2031	Website
Arkhangelsk Oblast	47	MMM	36	3	4	3	1	0	0	2023	2028	Website
Astrakhan Oblast	44	MMM	33	3	3	1	2	2	0	2026	2031	Website (Archived)
Belgorod Oblast	50	MMM	46	2	2	0	0	0	0	2025	2030	Website
Bryansk Oblast	60	MMM	51	2	5	1	0	0	0	2024	2029	Website (Archived)
Chelyabinsk Oblast	60	MMM	48	1	2	6	0	2	0	2025	2030	Website
Ivanovo Oblast	26	MMM	27	1	2	0	0	0	0	2023	2028	Website (Archived)
Irkutsk Oblast	45	MMM	35	4	2	2	2	0	0	2023	2028	Website (Archived)
Kaliningrad Oblast	40	MMM	32	3	2	1	2	0	0	2026	2031	Website
Kaluga Oblast	40	MMM	33	2	2	1	1	1	0	2025	2030	Website (Archived)
Kemerovo Oblast	46	MMM	40	2	2	1	1	0	0	2023	2028	Website
Kirov Oblast	45	MMM	31	2	4	2	4	1	0	2026	2031	Website
Kostroma Oblast	35	MMM	26	2	2	3	1	1	0	2025	2030	Website
Kurgan Oblast	34	MMM	29	1	1	1	1	1	0	2025	2030	Website (Archived)
Kursk Oblast	45	MMM	37	3	2	1	2	0	0	2026	2031	Website
Leningrad Oblast	50	MMM	44	2	3	0	1	0	0	2026	2031	Website
Lipetsk Oblast	36	MMM	28	4	1	1	1	1	0	2026	2031	Website (Archived)
Magadan Oblast	21	MMM	17	1	1	1	1	0	0	2025	2030	Website (Archived)
Moscow Oblast	50	MMM	35	8	2	3	1	0	0	2026	2031	Website
Murmansk Oblast	28	MMM	22	1	1	1	1	2	0	2026	2031	Website
Nizhny Novgorod Oblast	50	MMM	41	4	2	1	2	0	0	2026	2031	Website
Novgorod Oblast	32	MMM	26	1	1	1	1	1	0	2026	2031	Website (Archived)
Novosibirsk Oblast	75	MMM	51	10	4	4	4	2	0	2025	2030	Website (Archived)
Omsk Oblast	44	MMM	35	5	2	0	2	0	0	2026	2031	Website (Archived)
Orenburg Oblast	47	MMM	41	3	1	1	1	0	0	2026	2031	Website
Oryol Oblast	50	MMM	28	13	2	5	2	0	0	2026	2031	Website (Archived)
Penza Oblast	36	MMM	32	2	2	0	0	0	0	2022	2027	Website (Archived)
Pskov Oblast	26	MMM	21	2	1	1	1	0	0	2026	2031	Website (Archived)
Rostov Oblast	60	MMM	54	2	2	1	0	0	1	2023	2028	Website
Ryazan Oblast	40	MMM	37	1	2	0	0	0	0	2025	2030	Website (Archived)
Samara Oblast	50	MMM	42	6	1	0	1	0	0	2026	2031	Website (Archived)
Saratov Oblast	40	MMM	29	5	2	2	1	1	0	2022	2027	Website (Archived)
Sakhalin Oblast	28	MMM	21	2	1	1	1	1	0	2022	2027	Website (Archived)
Sverdlovsk Oblast	50	MMM	36	5	3	2	4	0	0	2026	2031	Website
Smolensk Oblast	48	MMM	41	3	4	0	0	0	0	2023	2028	Website (Archived)
Tambov Oblast	50	MMM	44	3	1	1	1	0	0	2026	2031	Website (Archived)
Tver Oblast	40	MMM	31	4	2	0	3	1	0	2026	2031	Website (Archived)
Tomsk Oblast	42	MMM	28	6	2	3	3	0	0	2026	2031	Website
Tula Oblast	36	MMM	29	2	2	2	0	1	0	2024	2029	Website (Archived)
Tyumen Oblast	48	MMM	40	3	3	1	1	0	0	2026	2031	Website
Ulyanovsk Oblast	36	MMM	27	3	3	1	0	1	1	2023	2028	Website
Vladimir Oblast	40	MMM	35	2	1	1	0	1	0	2023	2028	Website (Archived)
Volgograd Oblast	38	MMM	28	5	2	2	0	1	0	2024	2029	Website (Archived)
Vologda Oblast	34	MMM	18	10	2	1	2	1	0	2026	2031	Website (Archived)
Voronezh Oblast	56	MMM	51	3	1	0	1	0	0	2025	2030	Website (Archived)
Yaroslavl Oblast	46	MMM	38	2	1	1	2	2	1	2023	2028	Website
Autonomous Oblast
Jewish; Autonomous Oblast	19	MMM	14	2	1	1	0	1	0	2026	2031	Website (Archived)
Autonomous Okrugs
Chukotka; Autonomous Okrug	15	MMM	12	1	1	1	0	0	0	2026	2031	Website
Khanty-Mansi; Autonomous Okrug	38	MMM	31	3	4	1	1	0	0	2026	2031	Website (Archived)
Nenets; Autonomous Okrug	19	MMM	13	3	1	0	0	2	0	2023	2028	Website
Yamalo-Nenets; Autonomous Okrug	22	MMM	18	1	2	1	0	0	0	2025	2030	Website (Archived)
Federal cities
Moscow	45	FPTP	38	3	0	1	1	0	2	2024	2029	Website
Saint Petersburg	50	MMM	37	2	4	0	4	3	0	2026	2031	Website
Sevastopol^{[a]}	24	MMM	20	1	1	0	1	0	0	2024	2029	Website

a. Not recognized internationally as a part of Russia, but part of Ukraine.

== See also ==
- Politics of Russia
