= CTP =

CTP may refer to:

== Science and technology ==
- Cyclohexylthiophthalimide, used in the production of rubber
- Cytidine triphosphate, a pyrimidine nucleotide
- Child-Turcotte-Pugh score of chronic liver disease.

=== Computing ===
- Community Technology Preview of software
- Computer to plate, in lithographic printing
- SNIA Conformance Testing Program (SNIA-CTP), in storage networking
- Collection Tree Protocol for wireless sensor networks
- Canadian traveller problem, a shortest path problem

== Organizations ==
- Cambridge Technology Partners, US consulting company 1991-2001
- Concern Tractor Plants, a Russian machine building company
- MIT Center for Theoretical Physics
- Confederación de Trabajadores del Perú, a trade union center in Peru
- Counter Terrorism Policing, a collaboration of UK police forces
- Republican Turkish Party (Cumhuriyetçi Türk Partisi), Northern Cyprus
- Tashkent Aircraft Production Corporation, Uzbekistan, ICAO airline designator; see Airline codes-T

== People ==
- Cristian Tudor Popescu (born 1956), Romanian journalist and writer

== Transportation ==
- Certified Transportation Professional, US credential overseen by National Private Truck Council
- Chisholm Trail Parkway, Dallas-Fort Worth area, US
- Compania de Transport Public Cluj-Napoca, public transit operator in Cluj-Napoca, Romania
- Compania de Transport Public (CTP) Iași, public transit operator in Iași, Romania

== Other uses ==
- Certified Treasury Professional, certification of the Association for Financial Professionals
- Convergence Technologies Professional
- Comprehensive Testing Program (CTP 1-5) by Educational Records Bureau
- Compulsory Third Party insurance, Australian vehicle insurance
- Caxton and CTP Publishers and Printers Limited of South Africa
- Chinese Text Project, a digital library project
