= Economy of Chuvashia =

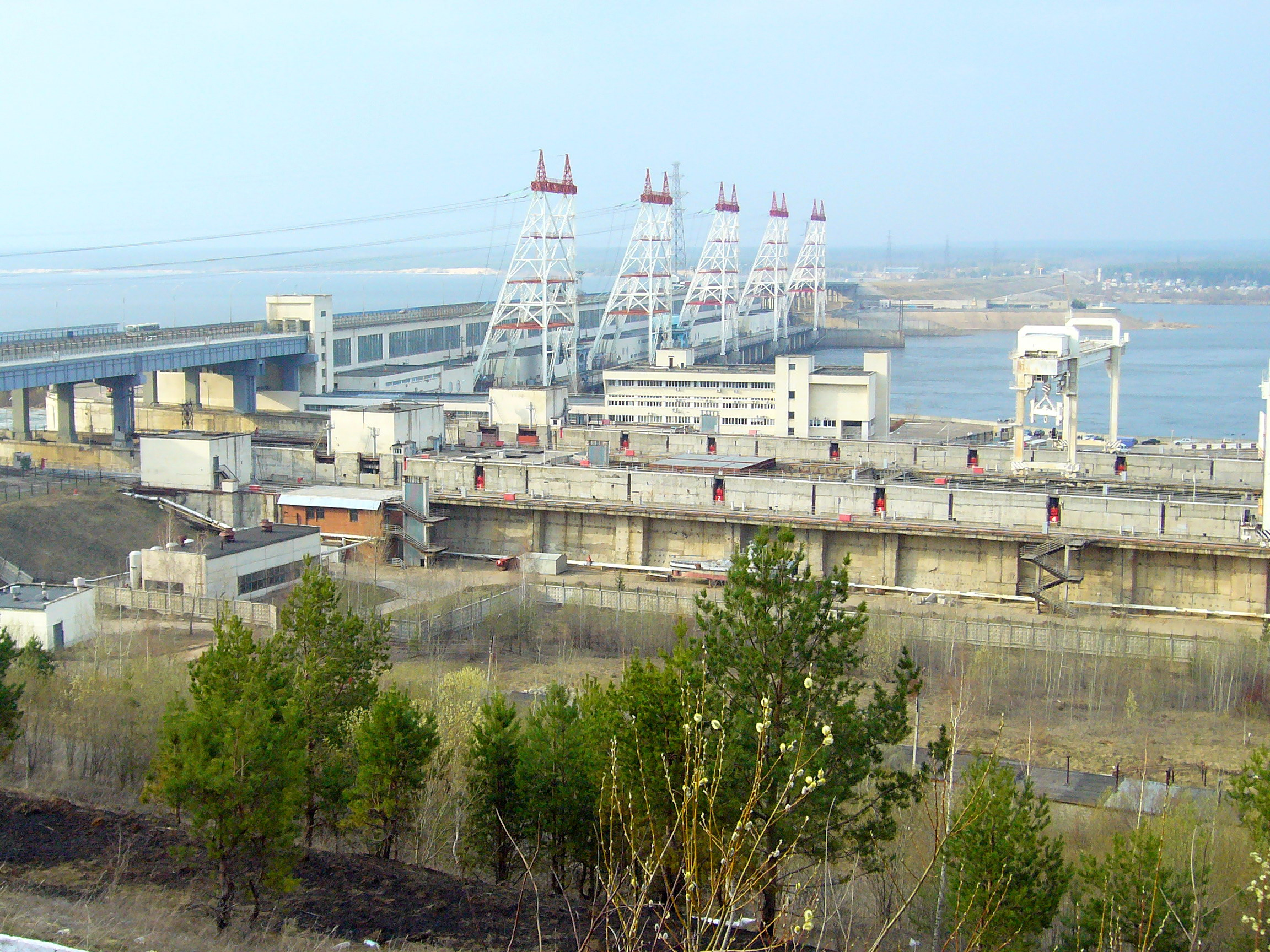
Cheboksary Dam

While Chuvashia is considered one of the less developed regions of Russia, the region has a positive investment climate. The liberally minded government is working to encourage business development and attract foreign investment.

== Legislation ==
The State Council of the republic has passed a number of laws aimed at encouraging business activity in Chuvashia. The income tax rate is 35%. One-third of this sum is transferred to the Russian Federation and two-thirds are contributed to the Chuvash budget (this is called the Republican portion). Notable tax privileges include:

- The profit tax rate (Republican portion) for foreign enterprises, joint ventures, and filial branches of foreign enterprises is five percent during the first three years of operation in Chuvashia. To qualify for this benefit, foreign enterprises must contribute at least $100,000 and 70% of the venture's initial capital.
- Enterprises and organizations producing consumer goods, producing industrial-technical products, and processing agricultural products are exempt from profit tax (Republican portion) for a period of three years.

While not particularly relevant to foreign investors, the government's commitment to economic growth can be evidenced by its efforts to encourage small business growth through the simplification of tax and business registration processes for entrepreneurs.

== Economic performance ==
In 2000, Chuvashia's economy continued its rebound from the 1998 Russian financial crisis, with industrial output growing by 10.6%, compared to the Russian Federation's overall rate of 9.3%.

In the year 2000, the average official per-capita income was 1,200 rubles ($45) per month. Actual income, especially in urban areas like Cheboksary, is significantly higher because many people under-report their true earnings.

While the 1998 Russian financial crisis significantly affected Chuvashia, the region was less affected by the crisis than were Moscow and Saint Petersburg. Nonetheless, economic output in dollar terms is still far behind from the levels achieved in 1997.

The most significant industrial sectors in Chuvashia include electronics and machine building, electrical energy, chemical manufacturing, and food processing.

=== Electrical engineering ===
Chuvashia is one of Russia's centers for electrical engineering research and manufacturing. Much of the republic's engineering talent is here because of the existence of the Russian Scientific Research Institute for Electrical Relay Production, an institute in Cheboksary that develops new and innovative technologies for electrical power transmission and power system control. There are many well-qualified engineers in the region, and firms in the republic produce a wide variety of devices, including controllers and regulators of technological processes, electronic drive equipment, circuit boards, aircraft electronics, medical equipment, and textile machinery. Largely due to the ruble devaluation of 1998, total output for this industry increased by approximately 18% in 2000.

The Electronics and Mechanics Plant ZEIM (joint stock company, JSC), is a leading Russian company specializing in manufacturing electronic devices and controlling equipment. Examples of the firm's products include electric actuating mechanisms, microprocessor controllers, water flow and heat meters, transducers, controlling devices for automated process control systems, and electric stop and control valves. The company is also a leader in the area of energy efficiency, and is working with the Chuvash government to develop new technologies to reduce energy consumption. ZEIM is a production and financial holding company that employs several thousand people both directly and through its subsidiaries and affiliates.

The Cheboksary Electric Apparatus Factory (JSC), is the leading Russian producer of high and low voltage equipment for the electrical power industry. Their products include mechanisms for relay protection, power regulation and control equipment, electro-drives, and other technological equipment. The company, which has approximately 5,000 employees, has established a successful joint venture with the Swiss engineering giant ABB. ABB Cheboksary integrates the systems developed by the Cheboksary Electric Apparatus Factory, the Research Institute for Electric Relay Production, and other firms and sells them to their customers in the electrical power industry around the world.

Elara (JSC), is an engineering company with both military and civilian production. Its military work focuses on aircraft electronics, and it specializes in airborne computers, navigation systems, and air control devices. Its civilian operations produce a variety of other electronics equipment, including automatic power control systems, printed circuit boards, and automobile control systems. The company is a full member of the International Union of Machine Builders and has approximately 4,000 employees.

=== Heavy industry ===
Much of the heavy industry in Chuvashia can trace its roots back to a decision of the Soviet government in the 1960s to make Cheboksary the center for industrial tractor production for the entire Soviet Union. Facilities related to tractor production grew quickly throughout the 1970s and 1980s, and in the 1990s the entire complex was privatized.

Currently, the largest industrial facility in Chuvashia is Promtraktor, part of Concern Tractor Plants. Promtraktor is the only plant in the Commonwealth of Independent States (CIS) manufacturing powerful tracked and wheeled industrial tractors, bulldozers, lift trucks, and pipelayers. The vehicles are powered by technology similar to Caterpillar, and their products are used for large volume excavation in a wide variety of industry sectors. Promtraktor products are used throughout the CIS, Europe, Asia, Africa, and South America.

The Cheboksary Aggregate Works, founded in 1933, specializes in the manufacture of spare parts for trucks and tractors. Specific products include tracks, tractor underframe components, iron and steel castings and forgings, transmission and engine parts, and other instruments. The company also produces consumer goods including locks and radiator heating systems. The factory has direct ties with companies in Italy, China, England, Germany, Poland, Greece, Lithuania, and Latvia.

Textilmash is a major exporter and is the only company in Russia that manufacturers shuttleless looms and other textile equipment. The company, which has representation in Europe, the Middle East, Asia and Latin America, exports products to 35 countries around the world. They have approximately 5,000 employees.

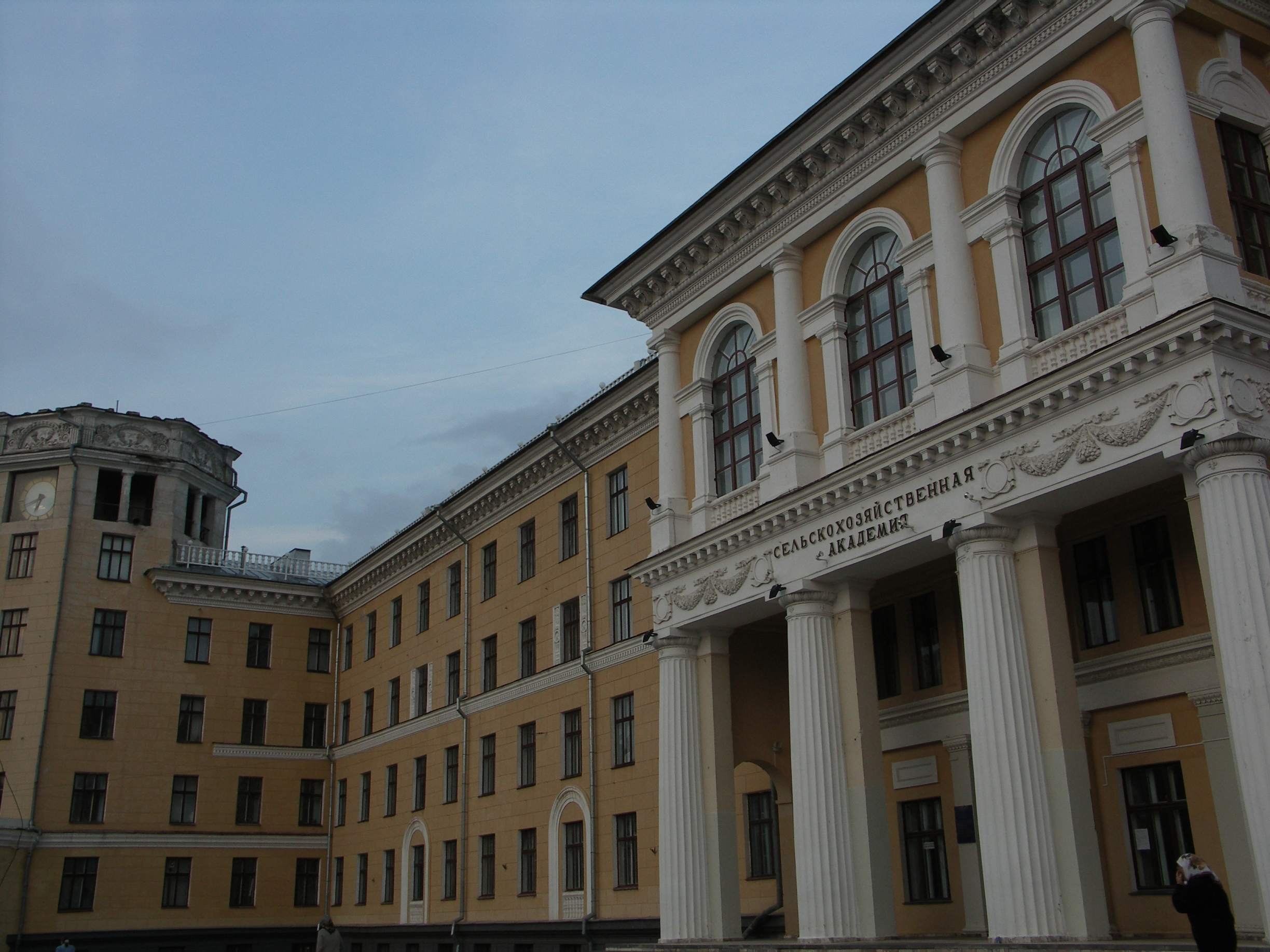
Agricultural Academy, Cheboksary

=== Food processing ===
Ask someone in Russia about Chuvashia and they will likely respond with a comment about beer, as the republic has been a center of hops growing and beer brewing for hundreds of years. This is especially interesting in light of the exploding growth of beer consumption within Russia. Chuvashia accounts for the vast majority of Russia's hops production and exports its product to Moldova, Lithuania, Belarus, Uzbekistan, and Kazakhstan. Furthermore, Cheboksary is the location of the Association of Hop Growers of Russia, an organization founded in 1994 that aims to increase production and processing of hops in Russia.

This historical fact, along with the continued rapid growth of the Russian beer market, gives the republic high potential for further development of the beer industry. Currently, there are two beer manufacturers in Cheboksary, and a third is under construction. The total output of these firms has increased by over 50% in the last five years to over 50,000,000 liters per year. The first, Buket Chuvashi (JSC), is a major producer of beer. Buket was established in 1974 and has a strong regional presence. Buket is interested in expanding production through a joint venture. The second brewery, Yantar (JSC), is a small regional brewer and is also interested in joint ventures to expand production.

In addition to beer, agribusiness in Chuvashia has growth potential. Other branches of agriculture important in Chuvashia include grain and potato growing and cattle and pig breeding. A wide variety of food processors in the region have been boosting production since the 1998 ruble devaluation, as Russian consumers switched to domestic food sources and away from expensive imports. Products produced by food processors in the region include meats, spirits, non-alcoholic drinks, mineral water, food concentrates, confectionery, and dairy.

=== Chemical ===
The chemical manufacturing industry, which makes up approximately 22% of the republic's industrial output, is dominated by Khimprom (JSC), located in Novocheboksarsk. The company, which began operating in 1964, is one of the largest producers in Europe of organic dyes, chlorine, phosphorus, silicon organic products, agrochemicals, and consumer chemical products. The company has significantly increased production since the 1998 devaluation. Himprom is the largest exporter in Chuvashia, has ties to countries all over Europe and the Americas, and has been actively involved in the creation of joint ventures. Most notably, the company has established a joint venture with Dupont in the area of herbicides and domestic chemicals. In addition to its facilities in Novocheboksarsk, Himprom has representation in Moscow and Saint Petersburg.

The firm Chapayevsky Zavod (JSC), is a well-known Russian producer of fireworks and cloud seeding rockets. The company exports their products to many countries throughout the world.

=== Banking ===
One of the largest banks in the region is Chuvashsberbank, the Chuvash branch of the Savings Bank of Russia, Sberbank. Chuvashsberbank benefits from the Sberbank's national network of branches. Another major bank is Chuvashkreditprombank, which is an independent regional bank with branches throughout the republic. It works closely with the Chuvash Republic Government. Both banks have correspondent relationships with major foreign banks and offer a wide variety of banking services.

== Foreign trade ==
Total foreign trade turnover for the year 2000 was $114.4 million. This is an increase of 28% compared with 1999. Exports accounted for $60.4 million (an increase of 3%), with the leading products being organic and inorganic chemicals, electronic equipment, and electrical measuring instruments. The region imported $54 million in goods in 2000, an increase of 73%. Its main imports are raw materials, textiles, and consumer goods.

== Communications and energy ==
Chuvashia has been modernizing its communications facilities and has a developed energy generation and distribution network.

=== Communications ===
As in most regions of Russia, phone lines remain the most common form of telecommunication. The republic's telephone company, ChuvashSvazinform (JSC), provides all major telecom services to its customers, and it is a simple matter to make direct calls to most places in and outside of Russia. International connections are quick and clear. Svazinform is working with the Siemens Company to upgrade its telecommunication system and replace old analog lines with digital ones. This project has already made substantial progress, and the quality of the digital network in Cheboksary and Novocheboksarsk meets international standards for high-speed video and data transmission. Companies can install and lease as many phone lines as needed. There is also a satellite-based telecom provider, ComBelgia (JSC), that provides direct intercity and international long-distance connections over their own private network.

Wireless communication services are also readily available through a number of companies, and costs are dropping rapidly. The average cost for a cell phone call is approximately $0.20 per minute.

Local e-mail, Internet access, and web hosting services are available through both Svazinform and Inform Technology. Internet access costs range from $0.90 - $1.80 per hour or $200 a month for unlimited access. This is still relatively expensive for Russia. Both Svazinform and Inform Technology offer high speed ISDN Internet access (64KB or 128KB per second), though only a small number of ISDN customers exist. Because of the high costs of installing new lines to support ISDN, Svazinform has recently added high-speed (2MB per second) access via radio transmitters and radio dishes. Additionally, there are a number of local companies actively developing software, including website creation services.

The local mail system works surprisingly well for international mail, but the security of proprietary information cannot be guaranteed. As an alternative to the Russian state-owned mail system, DHL, UPS, and Federal Express are operating in Cheboksary. Time of delivery is approximately four days between the US and Russia, and overnight for shipments to or from Moscow. For shipments other than documents, special arrangements should be made with these companies concerning customs clearance.

=== Energy ===
Due to the Cheboksary hydroelectric power station on the Volga River, Chuvashia is a net exporter of electricity. This station, run by Chuvashenergo (the Chuvash affiliate of United Energy Systems), provides all of Chuvashia's electricity and supplies surrounding regions with power. Due to this fact, electricity in Chuvashia is more reliable than in many regions of Russia. The plant has excess capacity and is expected to meet the growing needs of the region for years to come.

== Labor market ==
Due to its unusually high population density (the third highest of all oblasts or republics in Russia), Chuvashia possesses a large labor pool for a republic of its size. The people of the republic are also its greatest asset, as they are served by five higher educational institutions and 28 colleges and technical schools, which are currently training approximately 45,000 students.

Due to the high density of engineering companies and research institutions, the technical education level of the workforce, especially in the area of electrical engineering, is quite high. Additionally, average salaries in Chuvashia are quite low, with reported average incomes hovering around $50. Therefore, due to the high average education level and low costs, the Chuvash workforce has a significant competitive advantage over other areas of the world.

== Visit information ==
The Chamber of Commerce and Industry of the Chuvash Republic [www.tppchr.ru] assists foreign businesspeople with their travel arrangements. The director of the Chamber, Igor Kustarin, is knowledgeable about Chuvashia and can arrange meetings with the right people. The Chuvash Office of Foreign Affairs is also available to assist foreign businesspeople with their travel arrangements. Visa letters of invitation can be obtained with the assistance of the Chamber.
