= Volgograd Tractor Plant =

Vehicle factory in Volgograd, Russia

Coordinates: 48°48′0.7″N 44°36′37.03″E

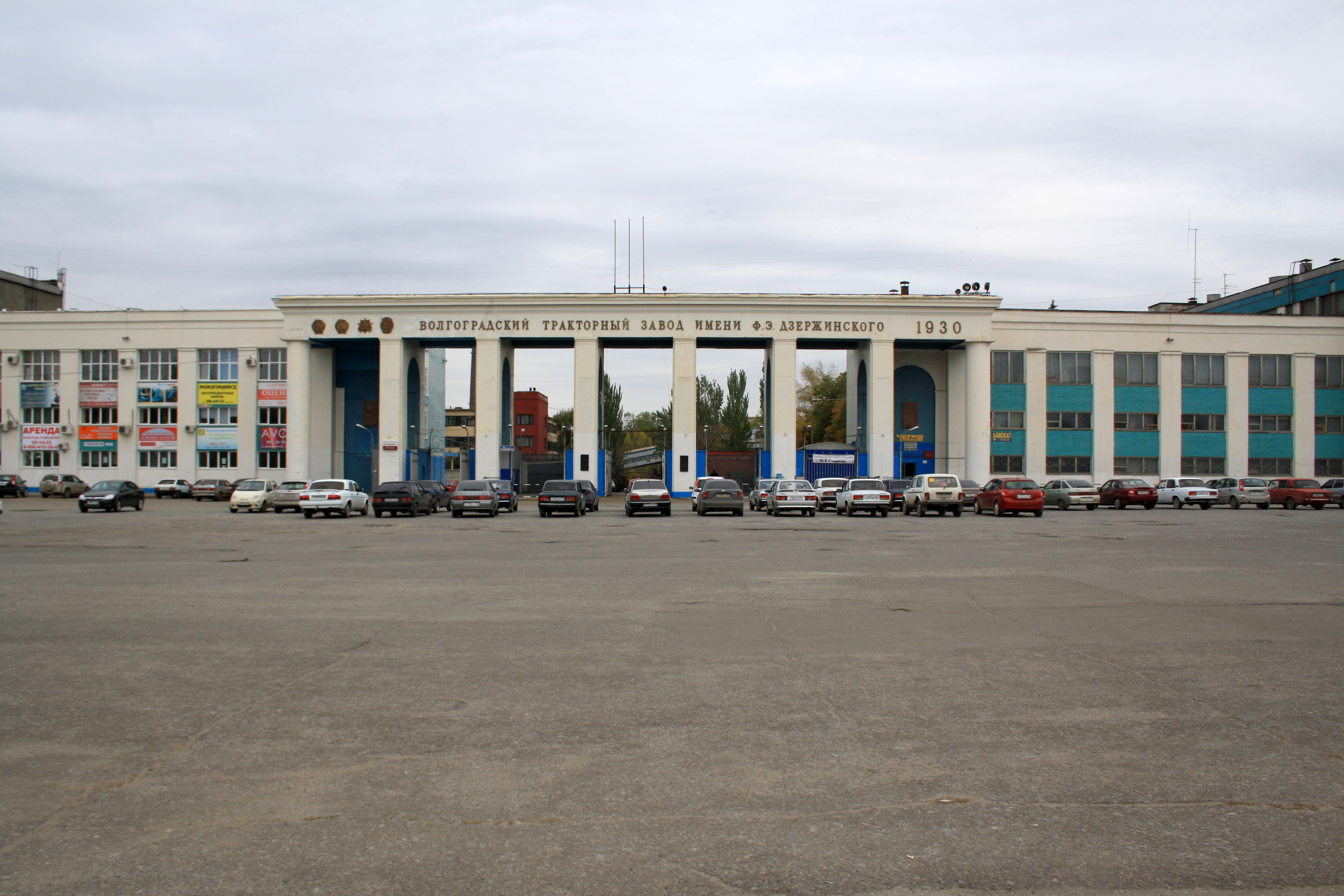
- Native name: Russian: Волгоградский тракторный завод
- Type: Open joint-stock company
- Industry: Machinery, defence
- Founded: 1930; 96 years ago
- Headquarters: Volgograd, Volgograd Oblast, Russia
- Area served: worldwide
- Products: Tractors, artillery, combat vehicles
- Revenue: ▲RUB 873 million (2011)
- Net income: ▼RUB 229 million (2011)
- Parent: Concern Tractor Plants

The Volgograd Tractor Plant (Russian: Волгоградский тракторный завод, Volgogradski traktorni zavod, or ВгТЗ, VgTZ), formerly the Dzerzhinskiy Tractor Factory or the Stalingrad Tractor Plant, is a heavy equipment factory located in Volgograd, Russia. It was once one of the largest tractor manufacturing enterprises in the USSR. It was a site of fierce fighting during World War II's Battle of Stalingrad.

During its lifetime, VgTZ has supplied more than 2.5 million tractors to the farming industry, making a huge contribution to the mechanization of agriculture. VgTZ tractors operate in 32 countries throughout Southeast Asia, Africa, Europe, North America, and Latin America. Also used for the production of military vehicles, VgTZ is inextricably linked with the history of Soviet tank building. The plant continues to operate on a small scale, but much of it is now derelict or has been demolished.

== History ==
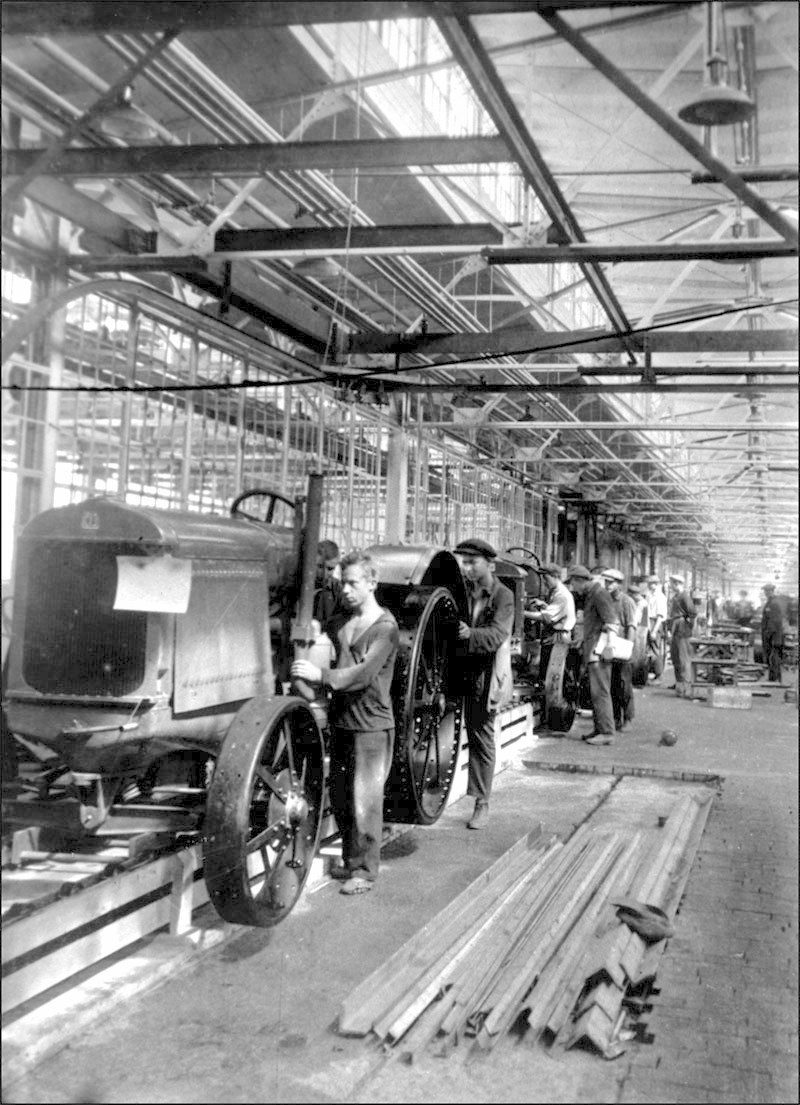
Stalingrad Tractor Plant in the 1930s

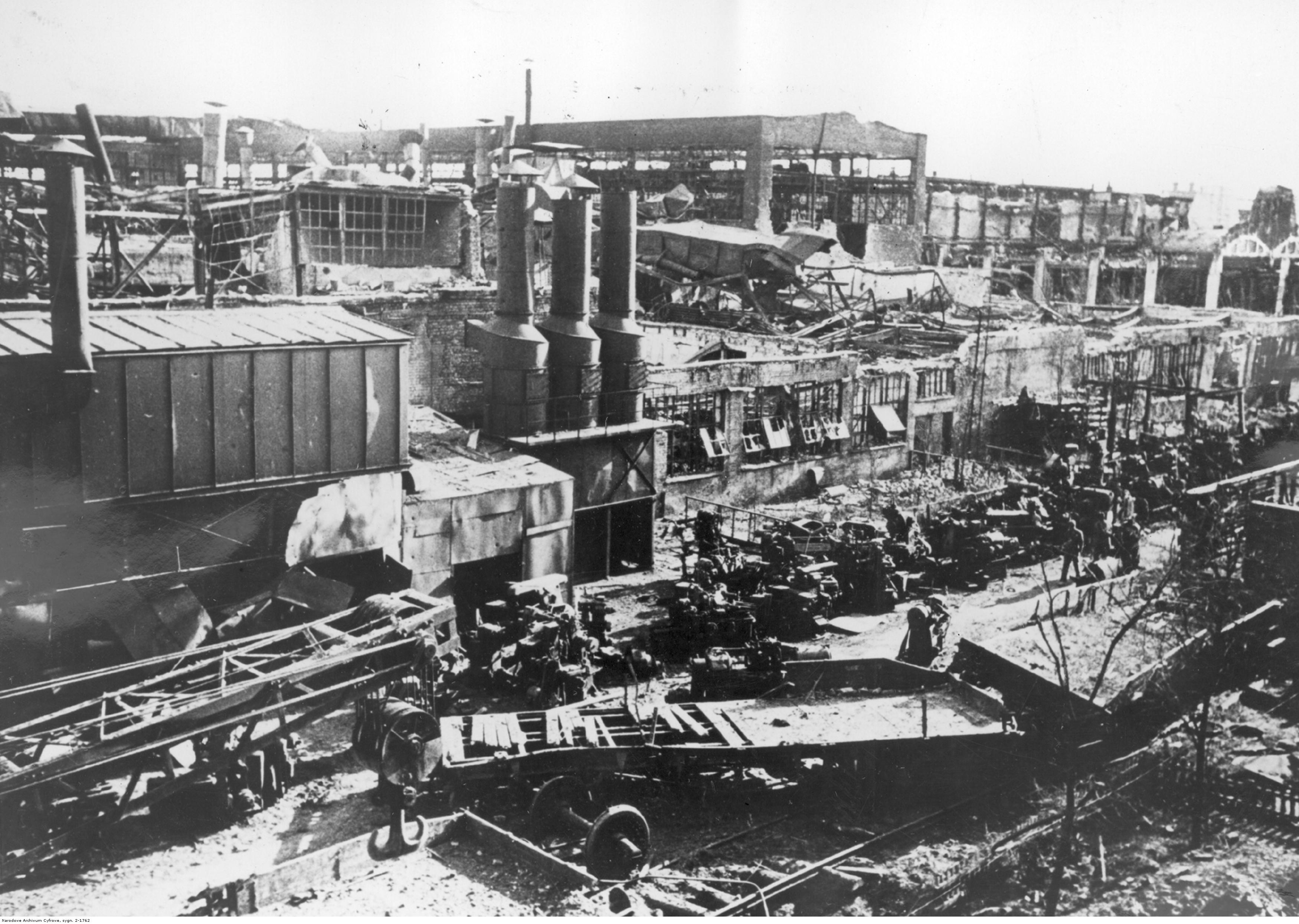
Factory ruins in November 1942

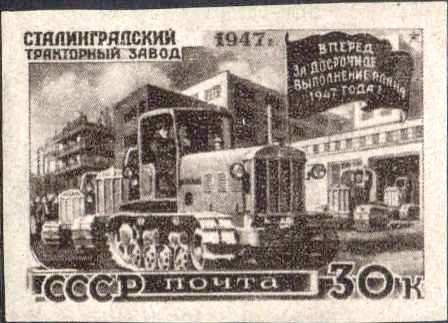
Stalingrad Tractor Plant on a 1947 stamp

Until 1961, the plant was called the Stalingrad Tractor Plant named for F. Dzerzhinsky (Russian: Сталинградский тракторный завод им. Ф. Э. Дзержинского, Stalingradski traktorni zavod im. F.E. Dzerzhinskogo, or СТЗ, STZ). It was one of the first industrial facilities to be built as part of the planned rapid industrialization of the USSR, which was adopted in the late 1920s. The foundation stone was laid in a groundbreaking ceremony on July 12, 1926.

Construction of the plant was carried out with the involvement of experts from Western countries, primarily the United States. It was designed by Albert Kahn Associates Inc., the company started by Albert Kahn, the architect for Henry Ford. In 1928, a group of Soviet engineers visited Kahn's office with an order for designing and building the Stalingrad Tractor Plant, and in April 1929, the Soviet trade representative Saul Bron signed the contract with Albert Kahn. The full value of the contract, including equipment, was US$30 million, which would equate to about US$450 million in today's money.

Once the contract was agreed, design and construction of the plant proceeded without delay, and the entire facility was installed within a period of six months under the supervision of American engineers. The steel structures were manufactured in New York by the McClintic-Marshall Company, and then transported to Stalingrad for field assembly. The huge flow of cargo was shipped via the Atlantic Ocean, the Mediterranean and Black Sea, then by river and over land to the place of construction. The plant was kitted out with equipment from more than eighty US engineering companies and several German firms.

The new factory was officially opened on June 17, 1930, and the first tractor to begin production on the assembly line was the 15-30, manufactured in the US by the McCormick Deering company; in the USSR, it became known as the 15/30 STZ (or STZ-1). By April 1932, the Stalingrad Tractor Plant was working at full capacity, with 144 tractors a day rolling off the conveyor.

Tank production began in 1932 with the launch of the T-26 light infantry tank, which was easy to manufacture and operate, and considered to be more reliable than foreign equivalents. In 1939, the first automated machine tool line in the USSR was designed and commissioned at the Volgograd Tractor Plant on the initiative of I. P. Inochkina, a design engineer who worked at the plant for 35 years. By the end of the 1940s, dozens of such lines were in operation at bearing and automotive plants.

By the time war broke out in September 1939, the tractor plant had produced a quarter of a million standard tractors as well as 40,000 tracked versions. During World War II, the plant was retooled to produce military equipment and weapons for the Soviet Red Army, most notably the T-34 tank. The plant became world-famous during the Battle of Stalingrad. When the German Wehrmacht reached the city in the summer of 1942, the tractor plant was their first target, and it was largely destroyed during the fierce fighting that ensued over the next few months. Once the hostilities had ended with the final Soviet victory in February 1943, the site was cleared of shells and debris so that restoration work could begin immediately. Full-scale production resumed at the plant within months of the city being liberated.

== Decline and regeneration ==
In 1992, the Volgograd Tractor Plant became a private joint-stock company, and entered a period of economic uncertainty with a decline in productivity. The company was floated on the public stock market in 1995 and became an OJSC. By the late 1990s, the plant was producing fewer than 3,000 tractors per year.

In December 2002, following rising debts and many changes in ownership, OJSC Volgograd Tractor Plant was divided into four separate business units within the group:

- OJSC Tractor Company VgTZ (Traktornaya kompaniya VgTZ)
- OJSC Russian Engineering Components (Rossiyskiye mashinostroitel'nyye komponenty)
- OJSC Territory of Industrial Development (Territoriya promyshlennogo raszvitiya)
- OJSC Volgograd Tractor Plant (Volgogradski traktorni zavod)

Responsibility for military technology projects was allocated to a separate concern, the Volgograd Machine Building Company VgTZ (Volgogradskaya mashinostroitel'naya kompaniya VgTZ), which was not connected to the "Volgograd Tractor Plant" group of companies.

In 2003, the OJSC Volgograd Tractor Plant group became part of OJSC Agromashholding, which specializes in the production, sale and service of agricultural, municipal and industrial equipment. The OJSC Volgograd Tractor subdivision of the group was declared bankrupt in 2005. Then in 2006, OJSC Tractor Company VgTZ was acquired by the non-commercial partnership Concern Tractor Plants, a leading Russian machine building company, of which OJSC Agromashholding is an agricultural division. VgTZ thrived under its new owners, and achieved a stable monthly performance for the whole of 2006, with almost 3,000 tracked tractors leaving the conveyor, including 768 of the promising VT series and 1,290 tractors with industrial modifications.

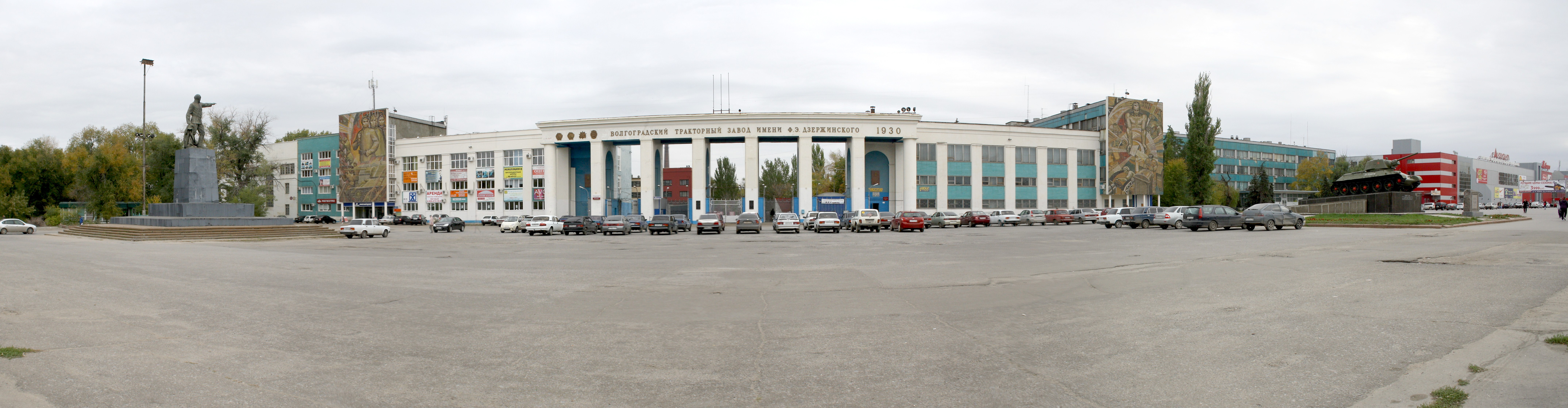
Volgograd Tractor Plant in 2011. From left to right: Dzerzhinsky monument, tractor factory aisle, monument to T-34 tank

The OJSC Tractor Company VgTZ subdivision eventually ceased tractor production altogether in November 2015.

In April 2017, the Russian Deputy Minister of Defense, Yury Borisov, visited OJSC Volgograd Tractor Plant to check on progress of the State Defense Order for new military vehicles. According to Borisov, the company was experiencing financial difficulties at the time. A decision was taken to merge the military side of the concern with the state-owned holding company Rostec, in order to stabilize the plant's financial position.

The separate Volgograd Machine Building Company, which is still based at the plant, continues to manufacture Sprut-SDM1 self-propelled anti-tank guns and BMD-4M airborne combat vehicles for the Russian Airborne Troops.

In the spring of 2019, reconstruction work began on the ruins of the tractor plant, with plans to regenerate the area into a multipurpose center, including shops, office buildings, and apartments. All that remains of the VgTZ works is a series of walk-through plants and two monuments in the square. The workshops have been demolished and the new owner rents the former factory management premises as office space. There is a small museum dedicated to the rich history of the Volgograd Tractor Plant. The northern terminus station on the Volgograd Metrotram still bears the name Traktornyy Zavod ("Tractor Factory").

== Awards ==
- Order of Lenin (May 17, 1932)
- Order of the Red Banner of Labor (February 8, 1942), for the exemplary fulfillment of the government's assignment for the production of tanks and tank engines
- Order of the Patriotic War, 1st degree (February 7, 1945)
- Order of Lenin (January 14, 1970)

== Products ==
=== Military vehicles ===
- T-26 (1932–1940), light infantry tank
- T-34 (1940–1944), medium tank
- STZ-5 (STZ-NATI 2TB) (1937–1942), 52–56 hp (39–42 kW) tracked artillery tractor, nicknamed "Stalinets"
- PT-76 (1951–1967), light amphibious tank
- BTR-50 (1954–1970), armored personnel carrier (based on PT-76 chassis)
- BTR-D (from 1974), armored personnel carrier
- BMD-1 (1968–1987), tracked amphibious infantry fighting vehicle (IFV)
- BMD-2 (from 1985), tracked amphibious IFV
- BMD-3 (1985–1997), tracked amphibious IFV
- BMD-4 (2004–present), tracked amphibious IFV
- 2S25 Sprut-SD (1984–2010 2018–), self-propelled anti-tank gun
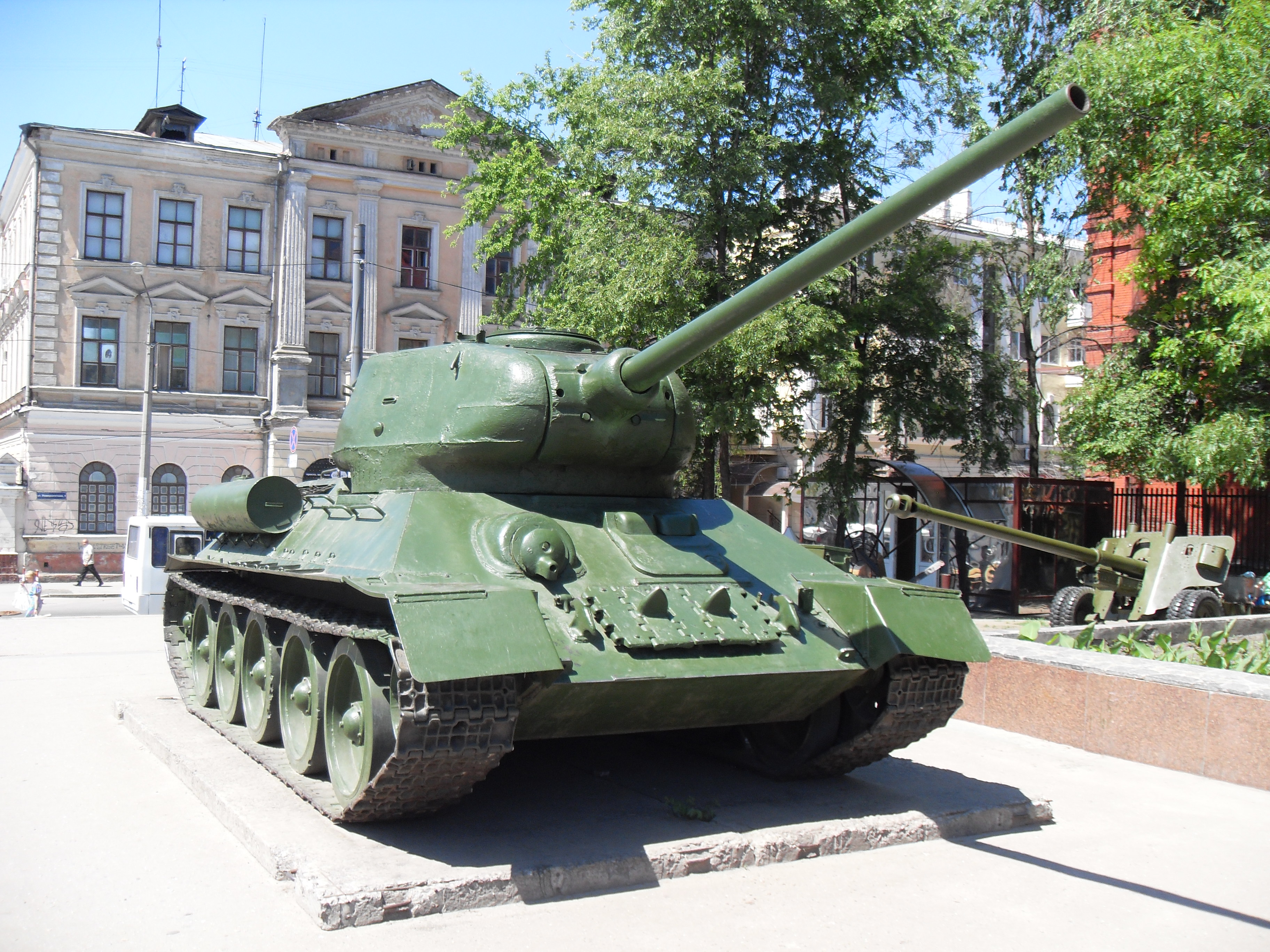
Т-34

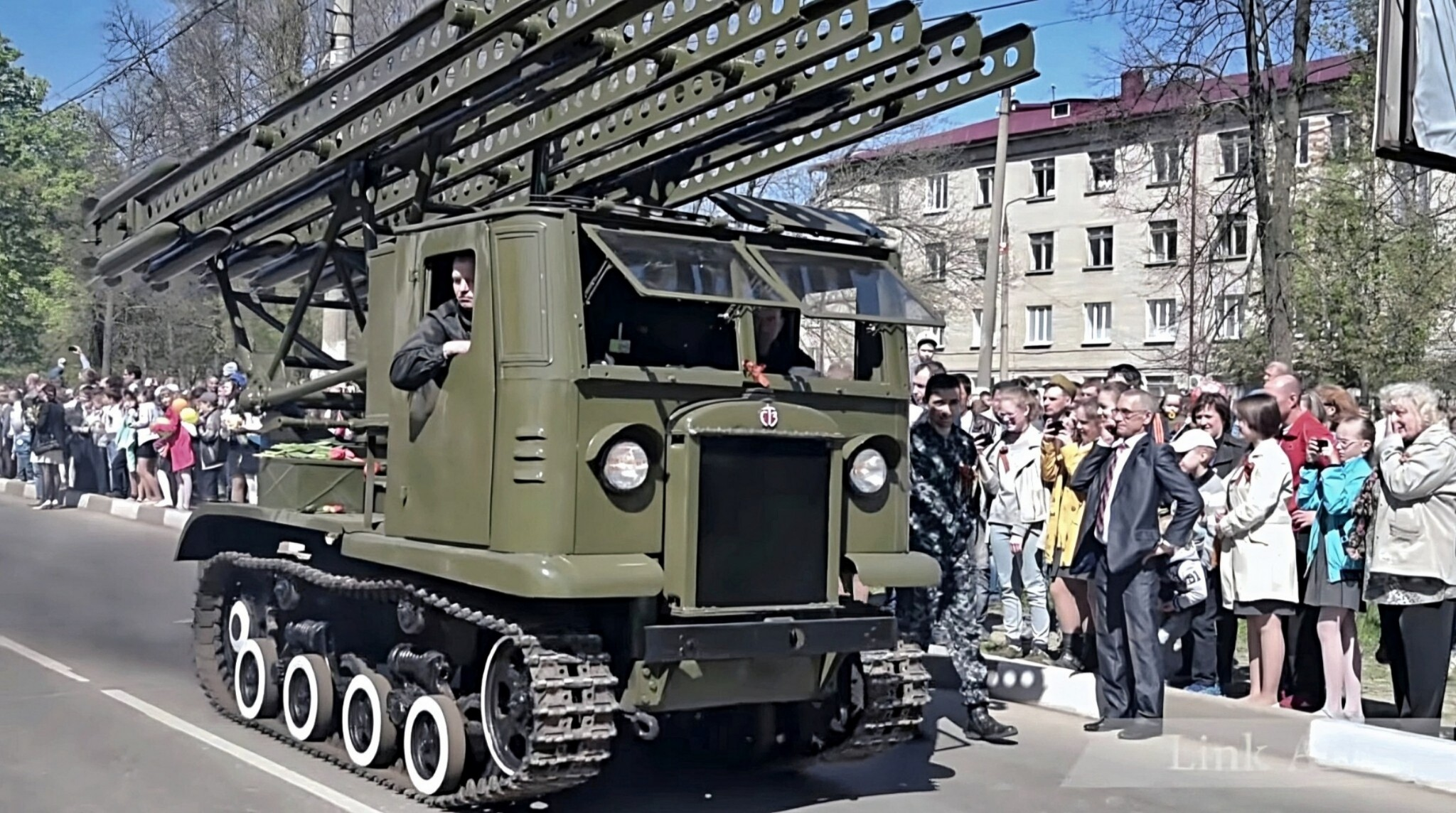
Katusha BM-13 STZ-5-NATI

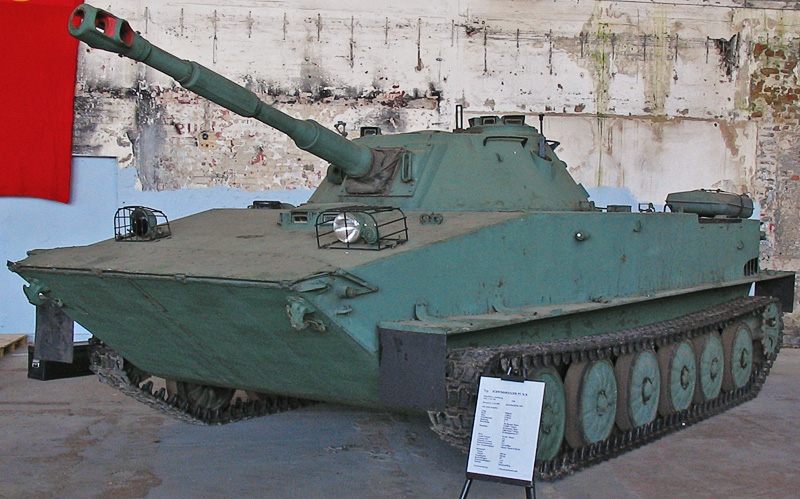
PT-76

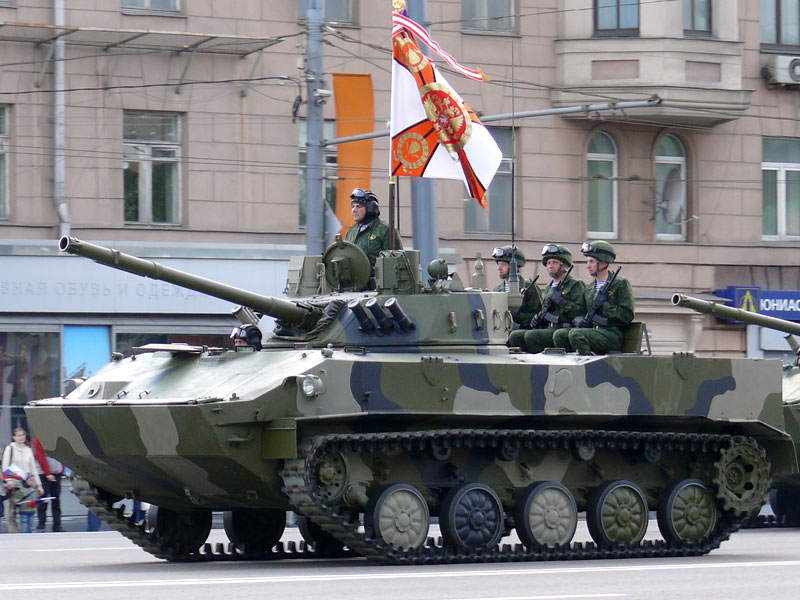
BMD-4

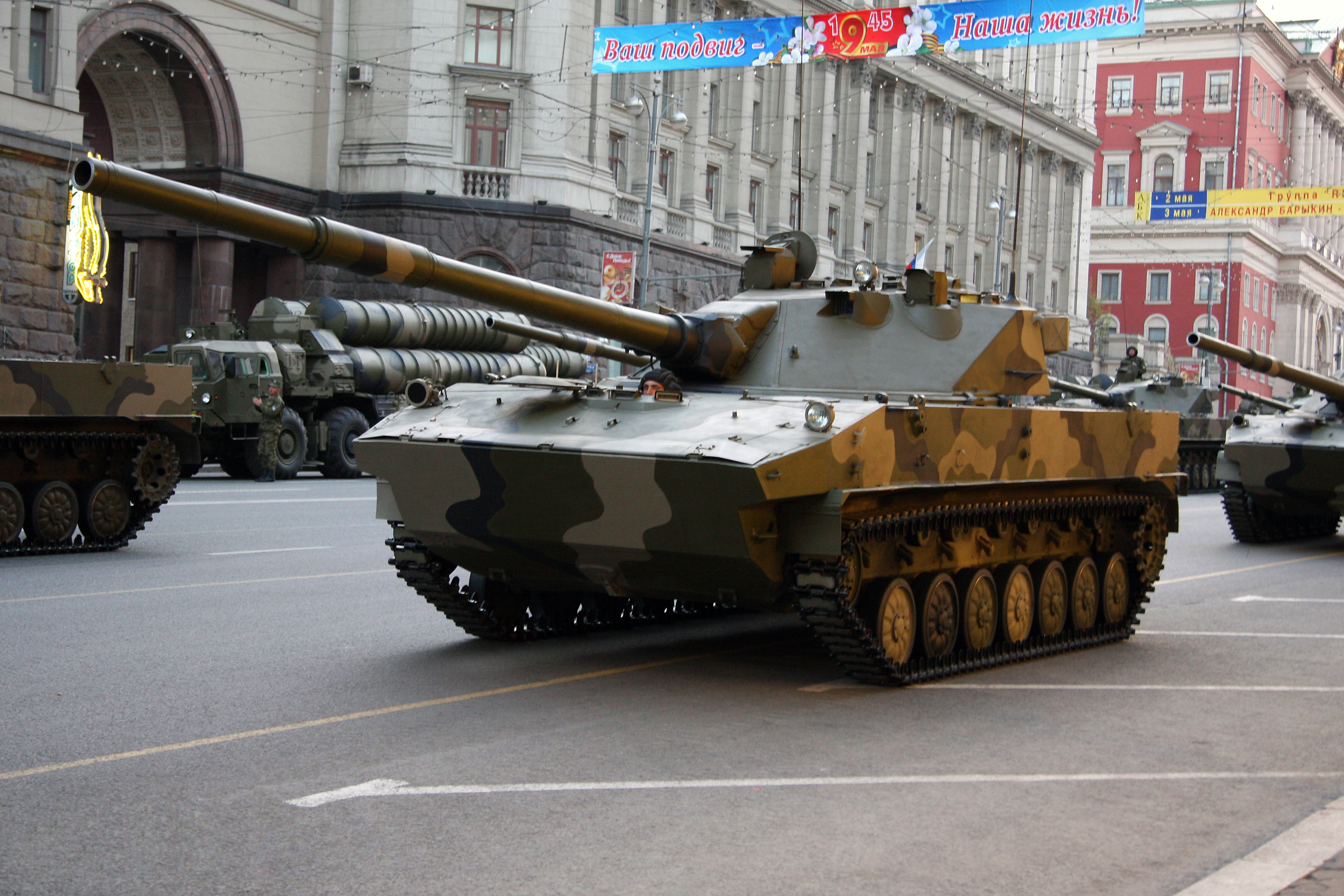
2S25 Sprut-SD

=== Tractors ===
- STZ-1 (STZ 15/30) (1930–1937), 30 hp (22 kW) wheeled tractor
- STZ-3 (STZ-NATI 1TA) (1937–1949), 52 hp (39 kW) tracked tractor (same chassis/engine as STZ-5)
- STZ-8 (1938–1941), swamp tractor
- DT-54 (1949–1963), 54 hp (40 kW) diesel tracked tractor
- DT-55 (1955), swamp tractor
- DT-75 (from 1963), 75 hp (56 kW) tracked tractor, hydraulic suspension system
- DT-75M (from 1963), 90 hp (67 kW) tracked tractor
- VT-100 (from 1994), 120 hp (89 kW) tracked tractor
- VT-150 (from 2005), 150 hp (110 kW) tracked tractor
- DT-175 (1986–1994)
- Agromash 90TG (2009–present)
- Agromash 315TG
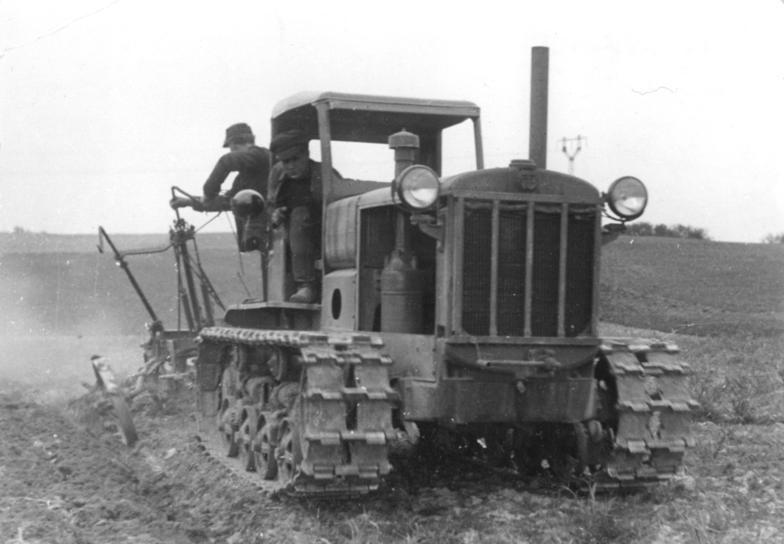
STZ-NATI

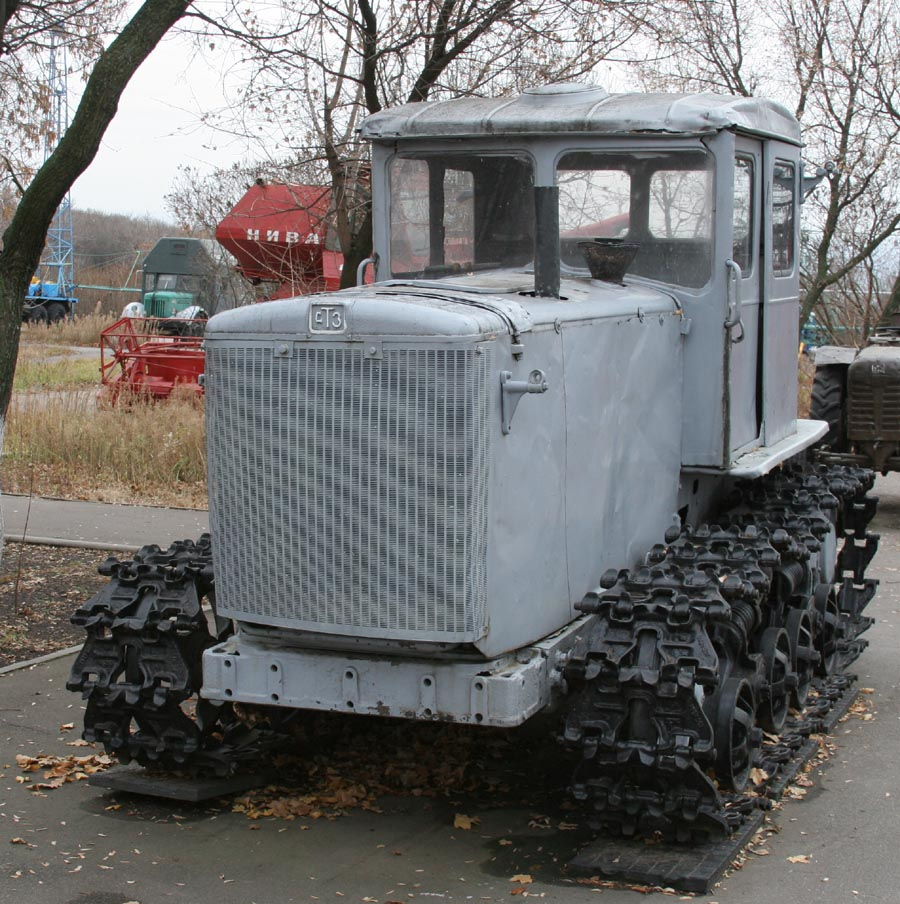
DT-54

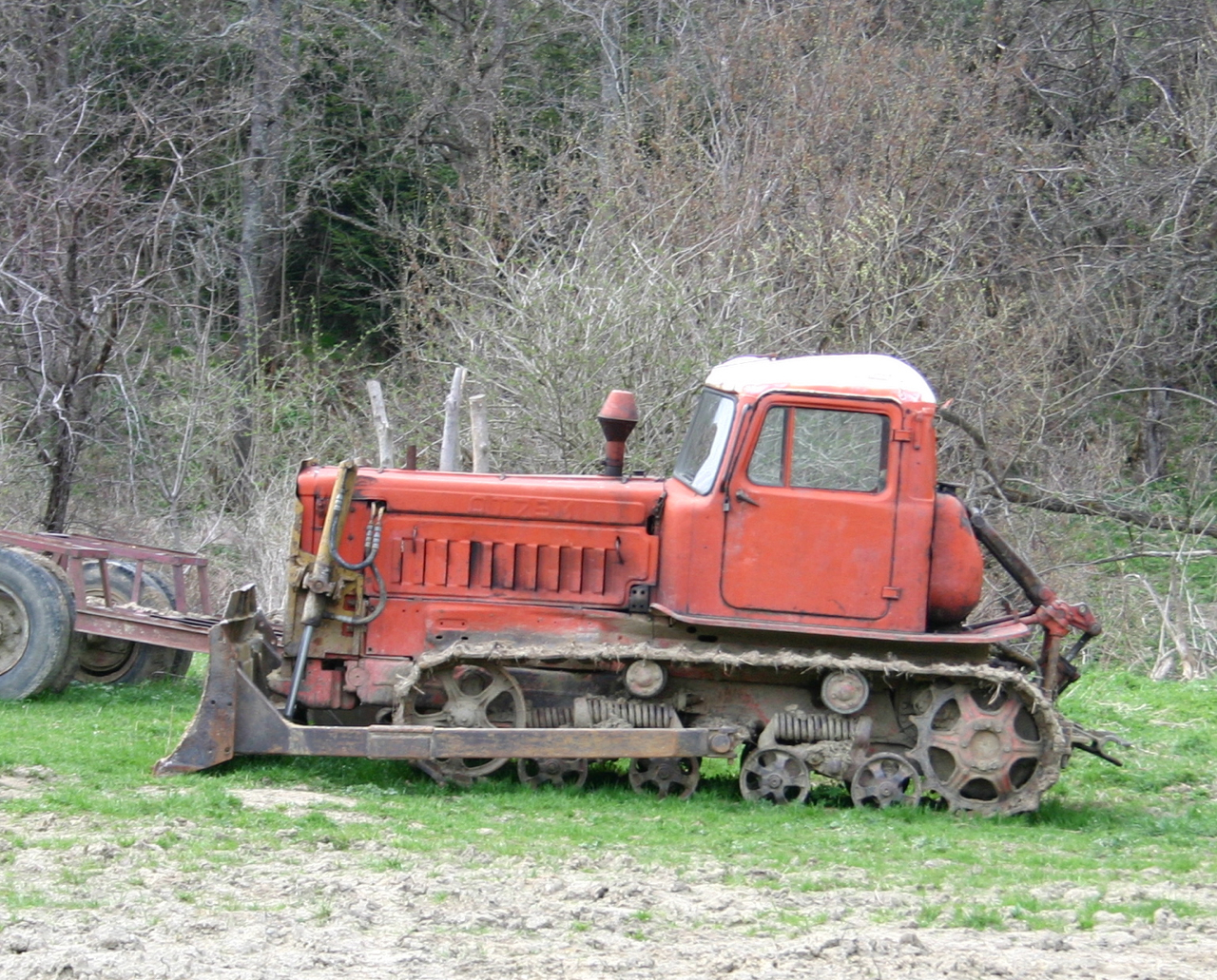
DT-75 tractor of early production in Poland

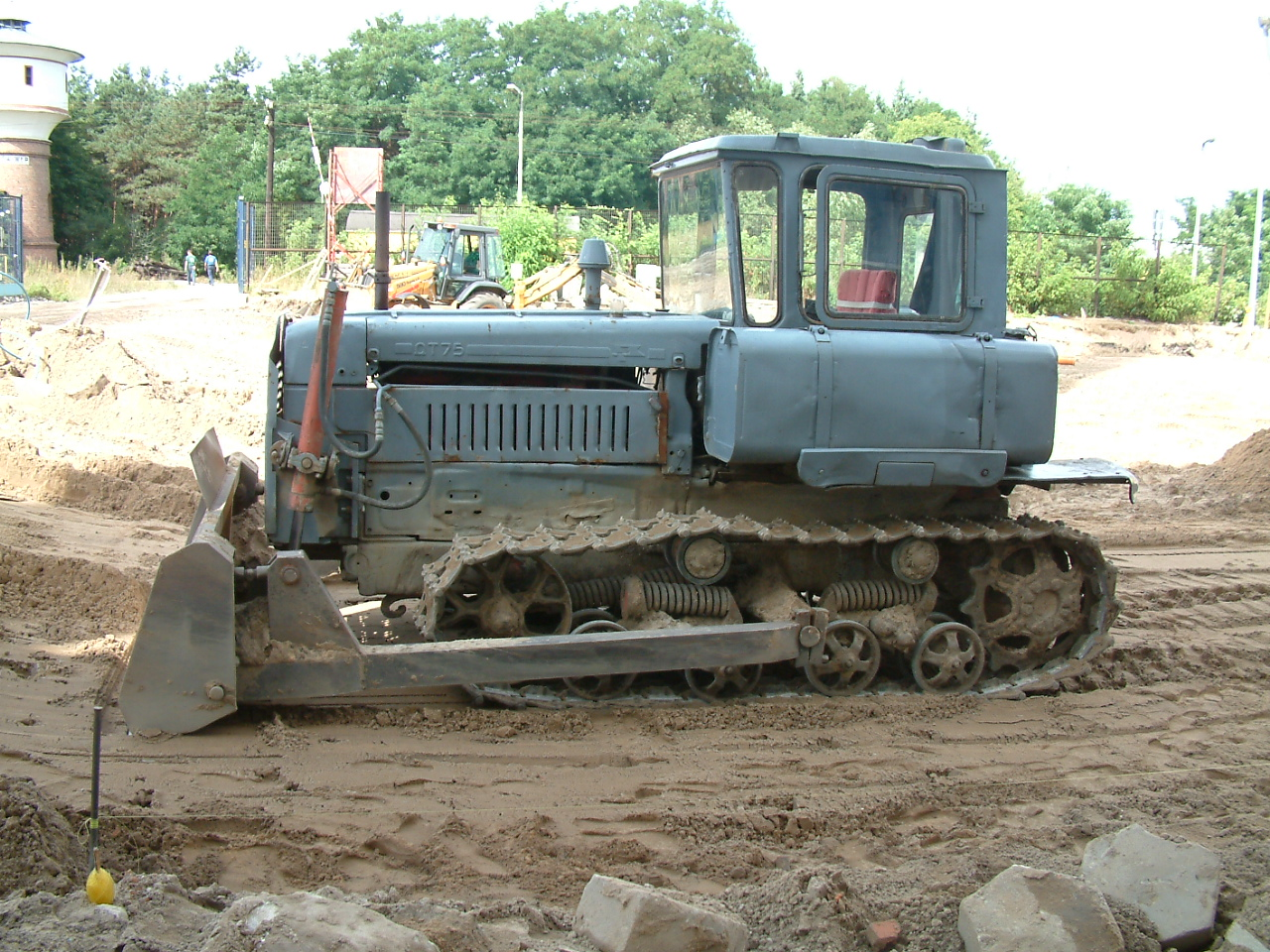
DT-75

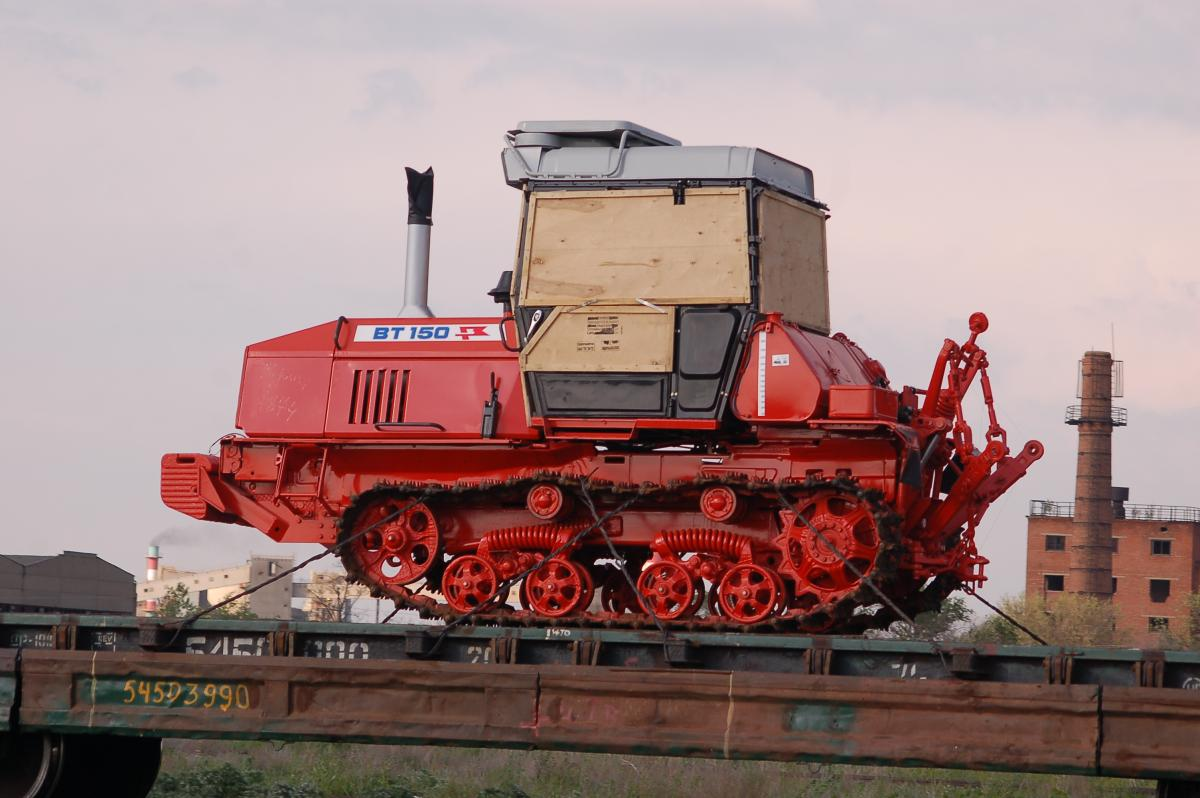
VT-100

== See also ==
- List of Soviet tank factories
- Soviet combat vehicle production during World War II
