= Convergence Technologies Professional =

Certification program for convergence workers

Convergence Technologies Professional was a certification program designed to ensure that all convergence workers have a proper foundation for using the technologies associated with Voice over IP. Individuals can take the CTP+ exam to demonstrate their knowledge of technologies and best practices including codecs, network planning, troubleshooting, providing quality video, and voice over data networks. The certification was retired in 2011.

It is now known as CompTIA CTP+.

CTP+ was the official convergence certification for CompTIA, a non-profit organization that specializes in creating education standards for the entire IT industry. CompTIA retired its Convergence+ in 2010 exam in favor of CTP+. Additional companies that endorse and use CTP+ include Avaya, Mitel, Nortel, Toshiba, Iwatsu, and many others.

CCNT or Certified in Convergent Network Technologies is an introductory certification or precursor to CTP+. To obtain this industry accepted credential, an individual must pass six competency tests in the following disciplines:

- Basic Telecommunications – explores analog and digital concepts, and introduces telecommunications fundamentals such as networks, business communications systems, signaling, Internet telephony and switching.
- Basic Data Communications – builds a student's knowledge of related software and hardware. This module introduces the technology of network architecture, packet switching, fiber optics, data communication channels and data communication devices.
- Computer Telephone Integration (CTI) Essentials – introduces the dynamics of connecting a computer to a telephone system for routing calls through switches. This program also teaches the technology of applications, architecture and system development.
- Local Area Networks (LANs) – develops critical understanding of the concepts and technology of LAN topologies, information transfer, transmission techniques, media standards and network management.
- Broadband Technologies – discusses the need for transmitting multiple signal types simultaneously by way of divided channels, and then explores the technology of voice and data integration, frame relay, SONET, ATM/cell relay, SMDS, BISDN, DSL and VPN.
- Voice over IP (VoIP) Essentials – teaches the principles of transmitting voice calls and fax over the Internet, and explores VoIP networks, bandwidth compression, the gateway, packet prioritization, RSVP, H.320 and H.323, and WAN engineering issues.
