= Iwatsu Electric =

Japanese electronics manufacturer

Iwatsu Electric Co., Ltd. 岩崎通信機株式会社
- Type: Public (K.K)
- Traded as: TYO: 6704
- Industry: Communications, Electronics
- Founded: Tokyo, Japan (August 14, 1938)
- Headquarters: Tokyo, Japan
- Key people: Shogo Kimura (President & CEO)
- Products: Communication systems, test and measurement equipment, oscilloscopes, reprographic systems
- Revenue: 39,567 million Yen (Fiscal year ended March 31, 2006)
- Operating income: 2 million Yen (Fiscal year ended March 31, 2006)
- Net income: 348 million Yen (Fiscal year ended March 31, 2006)
- Number of employees: 433 (1,258 including affiliated companies) as of March 31, 2022

Iwatsu Electric, Co., Ltd. (岩崎通信機株式会社, Iwasaki Tsūshinki Kabushiki-gaisha) TYO: 6704 is a Japanese electronics manufacturer founded 14 August 1938.

Iwatsu Electric is a member of the Mitsubishi UFJ Financial Group (MUFJ) keiretsu.

== History ==
Originally starting up as a telephone manufacturer, Iwatsu had been a longtime supplier to the public Nippon Telegraph and Telephone company. The company has enjoyed growth along the public NTT, expanding its products to radio communication equipment, oscilloscopes, and in the year 1961, their first reprographic system.

=== Seiichi Iwasaki: Founder ===
Seiichi Iwasaki was born in 1895 in Shimane, Japan. As a teenager, he moved to Tokyo without his family. He worked by day to support himself and went to school by night. Whilst in school, he became the leader of a circle of like-minded friends, which they called Hatenkai. Together, they vowed to succeed in the future.

Iwasaki dropped out of school in 1912 and began his military service in 1913 in Okayama—which he completed in three years. Then he moved to Hokkaidō where he started his career as an entrepreneur. His ventures in Hokkaidō stretched from railroads to coal mines, until the year 1933 when he changed his course and came back to Tokyo again.

=== 1930s ===
Seiichi Iwasaki was running a small business called Iwasaki Kogyo in the Yoyogi neighborhood of Tokyo for manufacturing and selling cables. Iwasaki realized that in order to stay in business, he needed to follow the national policy and produce what the country needed at the time.

The first focus was on anti-induction telephones. In the 1930s, the telephone infrastructure in Japan was primarily used by the railroad industry, the police, the utility industry and the mining industry. The telecommunications infrastructure was so poor that it had to rely on power lines and railway cables—upon which telephone signals were superimposed. Because the telephone signals were susceptible to inductive interference and noise and the defective wiring in the long lines caused too much signal loss, normal telephone conversations were difficult. Iwasaki Kogyo set out to develop an anti-induction telephone to solve this problem, whilst running the cable manufacturing operations. Similarly, Iwasaki Kogyo focused on secure, anti-tapping telephones.

Motivated by these opportunities, he started looking for engineers. Luckily he knew engineers from the members of Hatenkai: Minoru Tokoha and Motosaburo Hashimoto. When he talked to them, they both showed strong interest. With the help of these two engineers, he set up a lab in his own house in Yoyogi to develop the two kinds of special-purpose telephones.

After six months, Tokoha and Hashimoto introduced Iwasaki to Kokichi Hayakawa, the television research chief at the Faculty of Electrical Engineering at Waseda University. With the addition of Hayakawa, the development of special-purpose telephones speeded up and the anti-induction telephone and then the anti-tapping telephone were completed by the middle of 1937. (Hayakawa later became the first chief engineer/vice president of Iwatsu.)

The sales of anti-induction telephones started in October 1937, and the police, the Ministry of Railway, the power industry, the railroad industry and the mining industry welcomed the product. Demand quickly outstripped capacity, forcing Iwasaki to extend the factory. Iwasaki knew that a privately owned business was not enough to meet such high demands and decided to incorporate a company. On August 14, 1938, the inauguration ceremony of Iwasaki Tsushinki (communication instruments) was held at Iwasaki's own house. (The name Iwatsu became the official abbreviation for Iwasaki Tsushinki in 1967.)

Initially, there were 50 employees. They were manufacturing the said telephones and carrier-current telephones, plus components (relays, transformers, capacitors, etc.) necessary for making the telephones. Because the small factory, though extended, couldn't handle the increasing orders anymore, a new, bigger factory was built in 1939 in Karasuyama, Tokyo. The production department was moved to this new factory, leaving the other operations in Yoyogi. Around this time, the number of employees increased to approximately 200.

=== 1940s ===
Iwatsu was one of the three companies (including Hitachi and NEC) ordered by the army to develop a radar warning system. Because the Karasuyama factory was already running at full capacity, Iwatsu had no choice but to build even bigger factories. Kugayama, Tokyo was selected as the site to build new factories along with the headquarters, which were completed in 1943. Kugayama is the location of the current Iwatsu headquarters.

The development of the radar warning system was led by Chief Engineer Hayakawa, and after excruciating efforts by the engineers, a prototype was completed in 1944. The prototypes from the three companies were tested by the army, and Iwatsu's prototype got the honor of being the best in performance. Iwatsu was ordered to mass-produce the systems, which were installed across the country.

As a high-school dropout, Seiichi Iwasaki knew the importance of education. Iwatsu began building schools on the corporate campus, providing young factory workers with education. The schools also served as a training center for future engineers of Iwatsu.

The end of World War II was a huge turning point for Iwatsu. Seiichi Iwasaki laid down the company's future plan and gave the devastated employees a new hope. The plan was to make a quick transition to manufacturing consumer goods, starting with common-battery telephones. However, the transition did not go smoothly. Starting the development of new products (of which Iwatsu had no experience) from scratch was hard enough; rampant inflation and constant lack of materials did not help, either. When Iwatsu finally got the first approval for the common-battery telephone among other three products from the Ministry of Communications and made delivery in 1947, the employees' excitement reached its peak. It gave them hope in the days of confusion and starvation.

However, the company's livelihood was in danger. Iwatsu was deep in debt, frequent demonstrations were held by a newly formed labor union, and many jobs had to be cut. Faced with the severe financial difficulties, Seiichi Iwasaki and other company officials decided to give up the fight to save the company.

On March 10, 1949, Tadashi Adachi and Takao Yoshida were brought in to be the president and the senior executive vice president, respectively, in hopes of reviving the company. Drastic changes had to be made, such as selling off assets and properties and laying off employees, in order to lay the groundwork for a solid business base.

=== 1950s ===
After World War II, rebuilding the devastated communications infrastructure was ordered by the General Headquarters of the Allied Forces (GHQ) and became one of the country's top priorities. Iwatsu took full advantage of the situation and focused on developing and manufacturing telephones. Iwatsu's production facilities made significant advancements with the introduction of quality control and belt conveyors. The foundation for increasing production was laid. Iwatsu established its position as a telephone manufacturer. Iwatsu delivered magneto telephones and dial telephones to the Ministry of Telecommunications, and aircraft radio communications accessories to the Defense Agency. Nippon Telegraph and Telephone (NTT) Public Corporation, founded by the Japanese government in 1952, opened a big market for subscriber telephones and became Iwatsu's biggest client. NTT also allowed telephone sets and PBX systems to be commercially available in Japan. Iwatsu opened one branch office after another across Japan over four years to build a nationwide sales network.

Iwatsu was ready to venture into new challenges again. The Far East Air Material Command (FEAMCOM) in Tachikawa, Tokyo was in need of more oscilloscopes (which were scarce and not so advanced at the time) for testing their radar systems. The FEAMCOM cooperated with Iwatsu in developing Japan's first oscilloscope. This oscilloscope's greatest advantage was its ability to hold a waveform still on the CRT, making it easier for the user to observe and measure the waveform. Iwatsu named it Synchroscope, and the first model was delivered to the Ministry of Defense in 1954.

TV broadcasting started in Japan in 1953. NHK (or Japan Broadcasting Corporation) requested Iwatsu to develop a new oscilloscope for TVs because oscilloscopes were essential for measuring TV signals and Iwatsu was the only domestic oscilloscope manufacturer at the time. Iwatsu's Synchroscope continued to evolve in response to new demands, such as larger CRTs and higher frequency ranges.

President Adachi accepted his new position as the president of Radio Tokyo and resigned his position at Iwatsu. Yoshida became the third president and Kanichi Ohashi became the executive vice president of Iwatsu in 1955. During this high-growth period, Iwatsu's capital increased from 1,000,000 yen (in 1951) to 200,000,000 yen (in 1957). Iwatsu's stock price kept rising and started to get attention. Iwatsu went public in 1953 and became listed on the first section of the Tokyo Stock Exchange in 1957. President Yoshida, who had been the driving force behind Iwatsu's revitalization ever since he became part of the company, was also asked to serve as the president of Fuji Heavy Industries where he originally came from. It became extremely hard for him to look after two companies at the same time because Fuji Heavy Industries started their production of motor vehicles in full swing, so he remained as the president of Fuji Heavy Industries and became the chairman of the board of Iwatsu, in effect, stepping down from his active role at Iwatsu. Kanichi Ohashi assumed his position as the fourth president of Iwatsu in 1958. Ohashi's inauguration marked the end of Iwatsu's long postwar reconstruction period and the beginning of a new era.

President Ohashi visited the United States in 1959 to see the trends in the American telephone industry. He found out key telephone systems were already in actual use and was convinced that the key telephone system was the next new thing in the telephone market in Japan. Iwatsu had been working on the development of a key telephone system and the first practical system (with five trunks and ten stations) was delivered to NTT Public Corporation that year.

=== 1960s ===
Iwatsu was seeking the third signature product following telephones and oscilloscopes. After years of research in Europe and the U.S., Iwatsu took notice of RCA's electrostatic printer and copier technology (electrofax). Iwatsu signed a patent license with RCA and began research and development of what was seemingly unrelated to Iwatsu's then-existing technologies. The idea behind this decision was that there wasn't much difference in terms of communications, whether electronic or on paper.

Iwatsu's first dry-type electronic reprographic machine ELEFAX PC 201 was introduced at Tokyo Business Show in 1960. The next model ELEFAX PC 301 was shown at International Trade Fair and officially released in 1961. Iwatsu was the 13th company in the world to undertake the research of electrophotographic technology, but Iwatsu came in fourth to actually release a product based on such technology.

A new plating-and-coating plant was built in 1961 in order to modernize and streamline the plating/coating processes of ever-increasing telephone production. With the help of Fujikasui Engineering, the plant was designed with a proactive approach to prevent pollution, namely, an innovative wastewater treatment system. The plant became a model for such facilities, and thousands of people from various industries came to visit. President Ohashi placed emphasis on research and development, while Former President Yoshida had focused on increasing production capacity. Ohashi's belief led to the completion of a technical research lab in Hachioji, Tokyo in 1964. Still, Iwatsu's production facilities kept expanding in order to meet growing demands for subscriber telephones.

The Iwatsu telephone production hit the 50,000 sets per month mark in June 1964. An accumulated total of 1,000,000 sets were manufactured by October 1965. An accumulated total of 2,000,000 sets were manufactured by June 1967. In December 1967, Iwatsu was producing 80,000 sets per month, and the number of employees increased to 2,800.

The current Kugayama main building at the Iwatsu headquarters was completed in March 1966, replacing the old wooden building. The reinforced concrete building is five stories high with one basement level. It took strong determination and efforts to build such a building in the middle of a recession. The new main building was a testament to the endurance of employees who supported the company throughout postwar uncertainty.

Iwatsu started branching out into overseas markets, doing business with Southeast Asian countries, Kenya, Dominican Republic, and Ireland. Iwatsu took part in trade shows in the United States, South Korea, Switzerland, Germany, and so on. The Trade Department was established in February 1966 to diversify export markets and expand overseas sales.

An international bid was conducted by the Kuwaiti government in 1967 as part of its plan to expand telephone services. Iwatsu won the 50,000,000-yen bid, beating strong competitors from England, Belgium, Yugoslavia, Germany, etc. Iwatsu exported key telephone systems to Kuwait. It was Iwatsu's first mass-export of key telephone systems.

Iwatsu celebrated its 30th anniversary in 1968. A commemorative exhibit showing all divisions' historic products was held in Tokyo. It drew in over 13,000 people. A big party was also held in Tokyo, inviting 750 prominent people from various fields.

Seiichi Iwasaki, the founder of Iwatsu, died at the age of 74 on September 25, 1969. The corporate funeral for him was held four days later. Representatives from all walks of life came and paid their respects. Toshio Iwata became the fifth president of Iwatsu in November 1969. Ohashi became the chairman of the board.

=== 1970s ===
Iwatsu continued to expand its production and export. Kyushu Iwatsu and Fukushima Iwatsu were established for manufacturing key telephone systems and associated components. Iwatsu Seimitsu was established for manufacturing and selling switches for measurement instruments. Iwatsu became partners with Rex Rotary of Denmark and exported ELEFAX to 77 countries. Iwatsu tied up with a Taiwanese company to export telephone manufacturing technologies and start production in Taiwan.

The Trade Department under the supervision of the Sales Division became independent as the International Department in April 1974 for promotion of export and expansion into international markets. Although export to the U.S. marked a record high in 1973 (the year the energy crisis hit), accurate information from the U.S. distributors was not readily available, which was a problem for planning new products in Japan. Iwatsu decided to establish direct sales in America. Iwatsu America (now Iwatsu Voice Networks) was established in New Jersey in December 1975.

A wooded area of Iwatsu headquarters premises was named Iwatsu Garden and opened to public in 1974 as a contribution to the community. It became a relaxation/recreation area for the people in the surrounding area.

== Products ==
The company's primary focus is on the following three business domains:

- Business communication systems,

including CTI and VoIP devices to PBXs and office digital phones.

- Test and measurement equipment,

ranging from oscilloscopes to various other network testing systems.

- Reprographic systems,

including digital reprographic systems, with which the company claims to have top share.

== Major subsidiaries and affiliates ==
Some of the major Iwatsu subsidiaries and affiliates are:

- Iwatsu Test Instruments Corporation (岩通計測株式会社), Iwatsu's test and measurement equipment arm
- Iwatsu Voice Networks (IVN). Iwatsu's North American subsidiary.
- Iwatsu Hong Kong Limited
- Iwatsu (Malaysia) Sdn. Bhd.
