= Onega Tractor Plant =

Manufacturing plant in Russia

- Company type: Private limited company
- Industry: Mechanical engineering
- Founded: August 29, 1703
- Headquarters: Petrozavodsk, Karelia, Russia
- Products: Tractors, tracked skidders, forwarders, harvesters etc
- Revenue: 143,200,000 United States dollar (1994)
- Parent: Concern Tractor Plants
- Website: www.otz.tplants.com

The Onega Tractor Plant or Onezhskiy Tractor Plant (Russian: Онежский тракторный завод, romanized: Onezhsiy traktorniy zavod, abbreviated ОТЗ, OTZ) is a major Russian machine-building manufacturing plant in Petrozavodsk, Karelia, Russia.

== History ==
The plant was established on August 29, 1703. The first tractor, tracked skidder the TDT-40 model, was manufactured on 1956. The Onega Tractor Plant (OTZ) is a company in Russia that manufactures and markets a range of forestry vehicles and machinery such as forwarders and harvesters.

=== Historical products ===
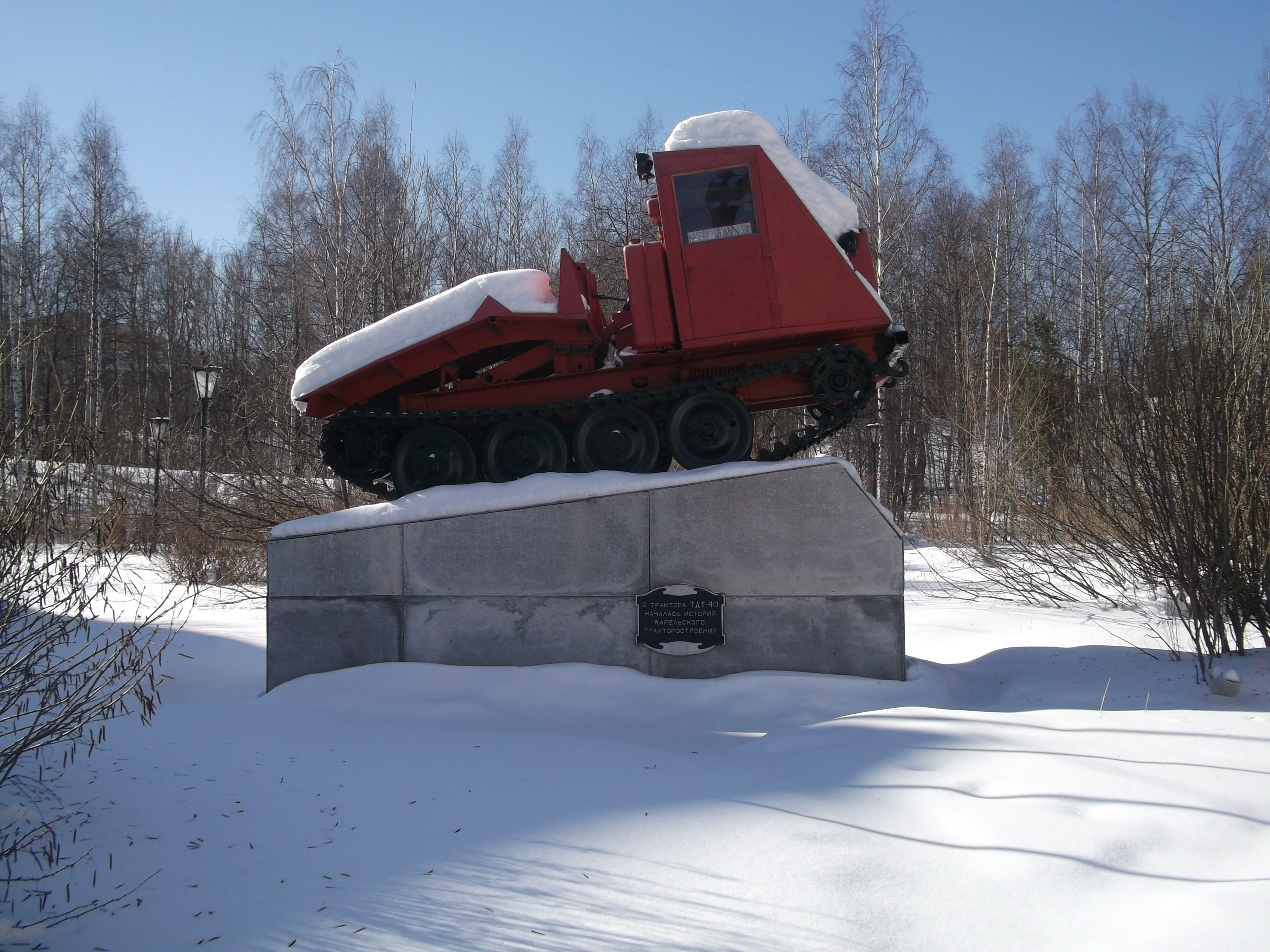
TDT-40 tracked skidder (1956-1969)

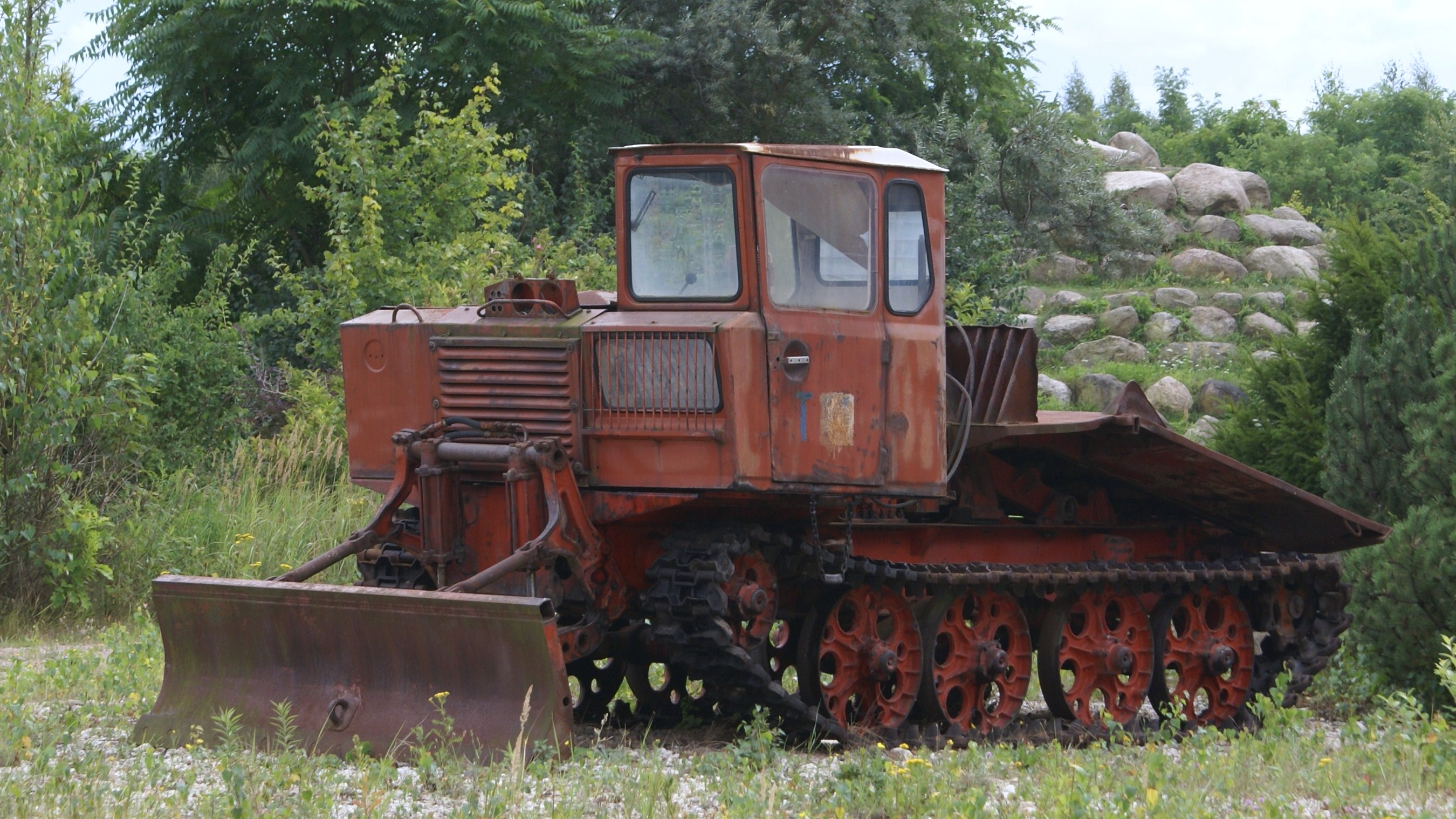
TDT-55 tracked skidder (1966-2003)

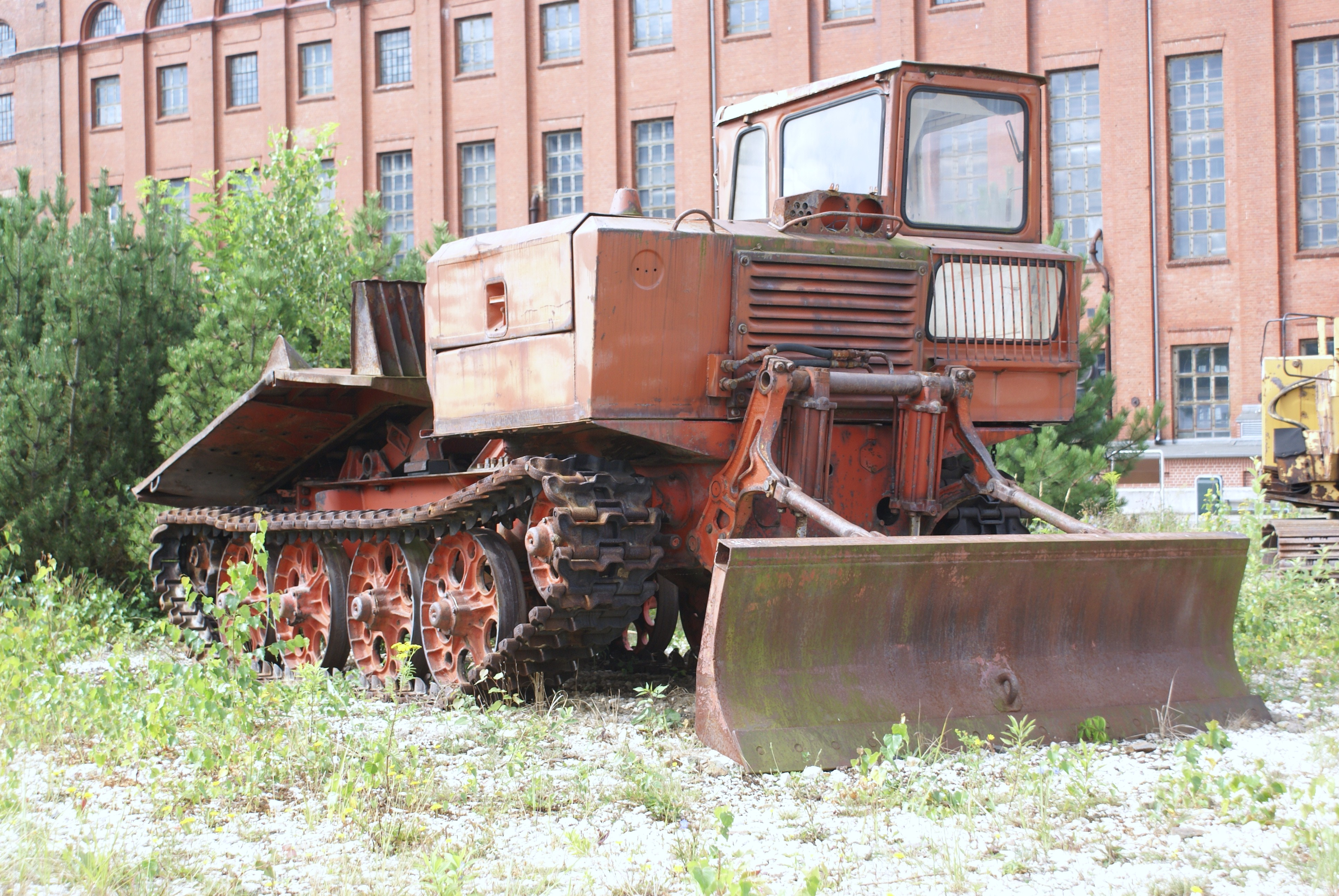
TDT-55 tracked skidder (1966-2003)

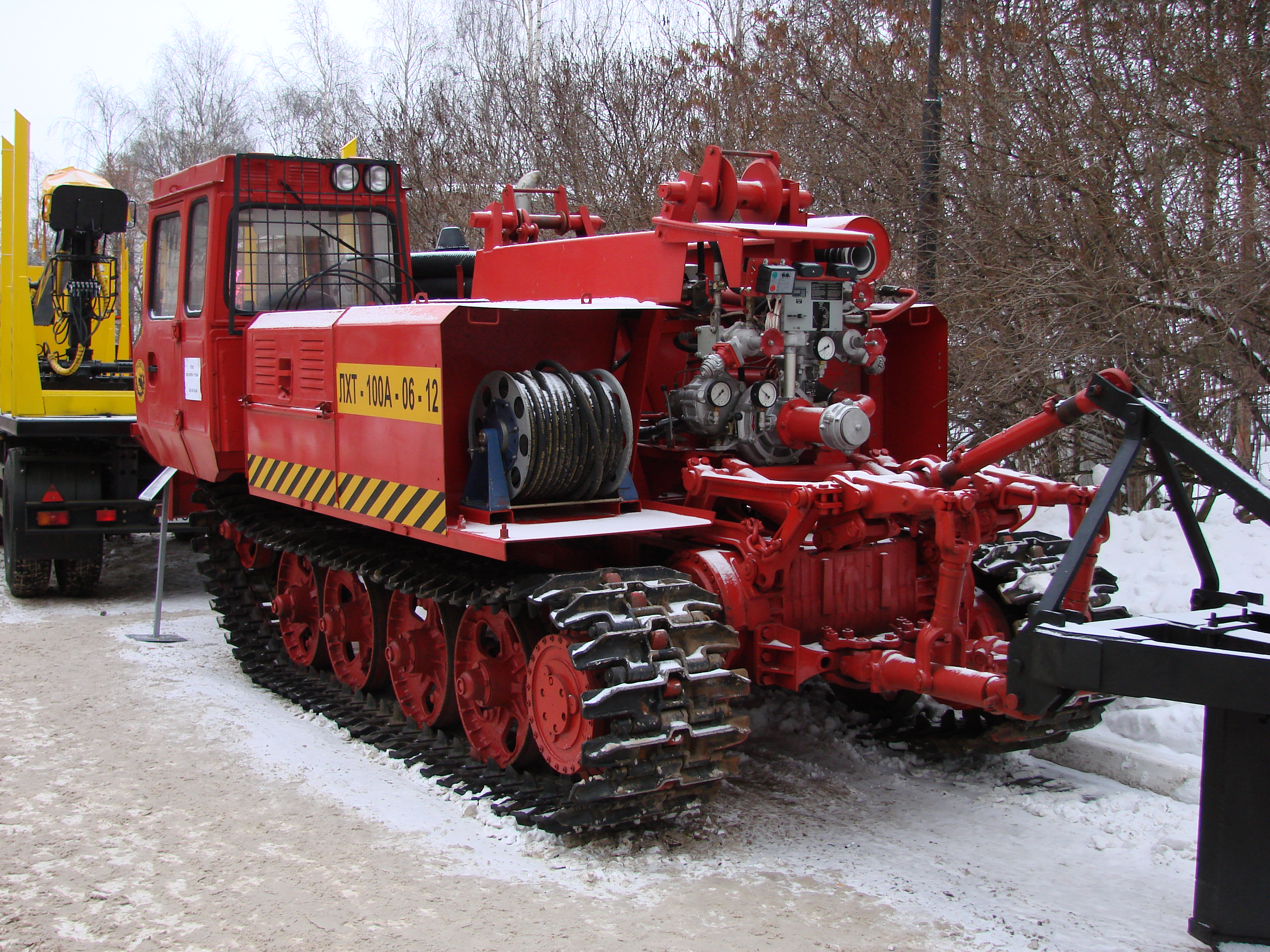
LHT-100A tracked tractor (2000-2013)

== Products ==
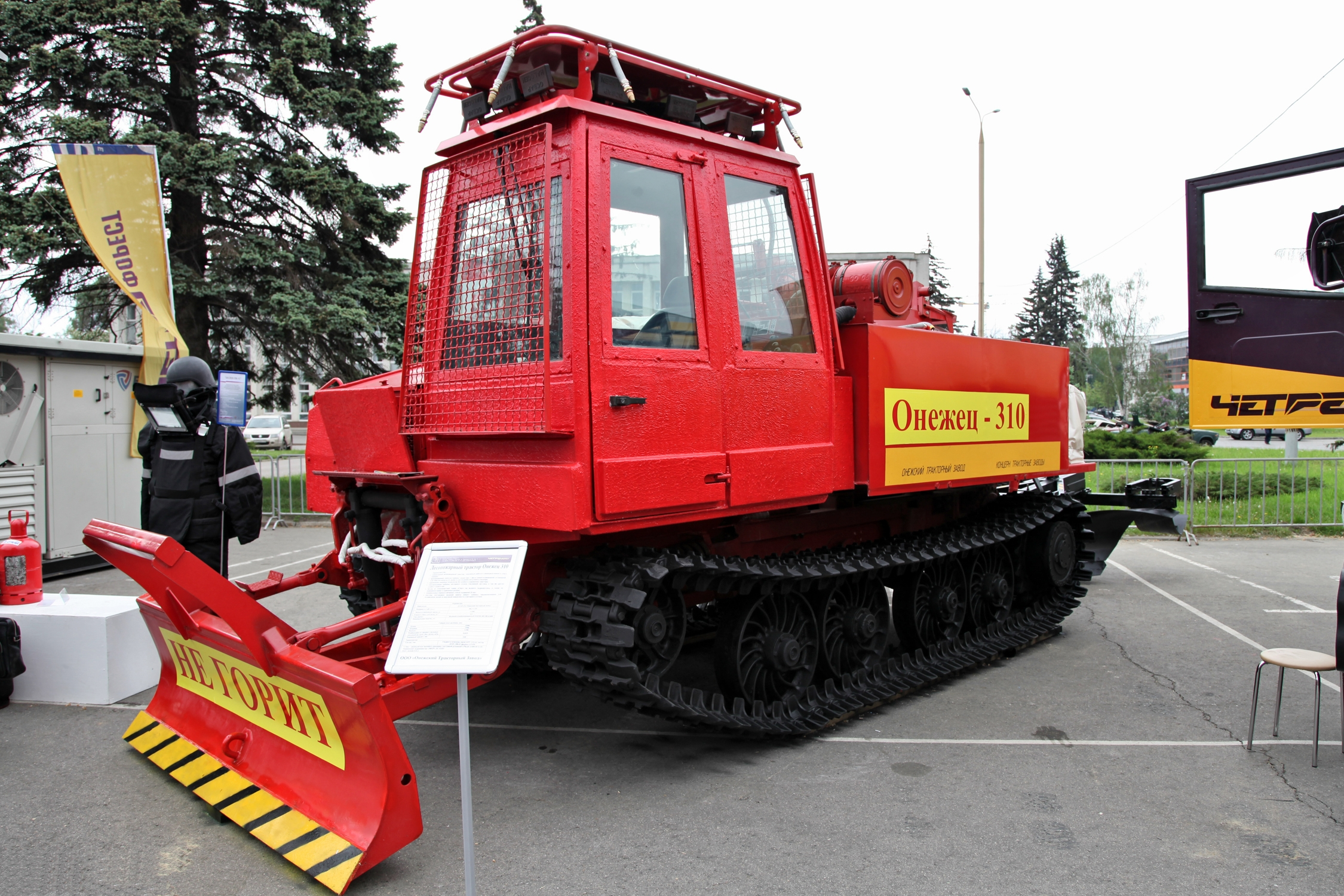
Onezhets-310

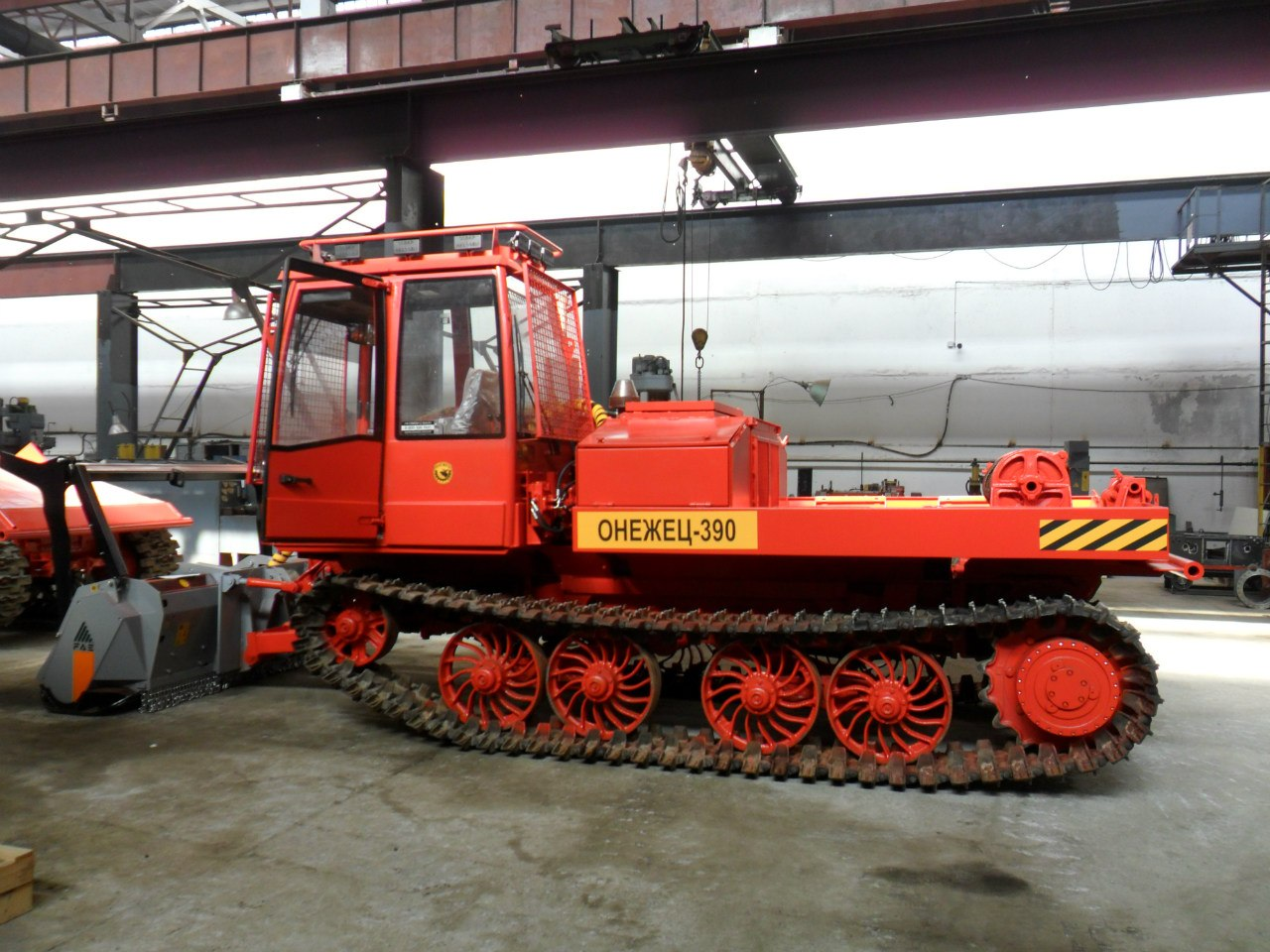
Onezhets-390

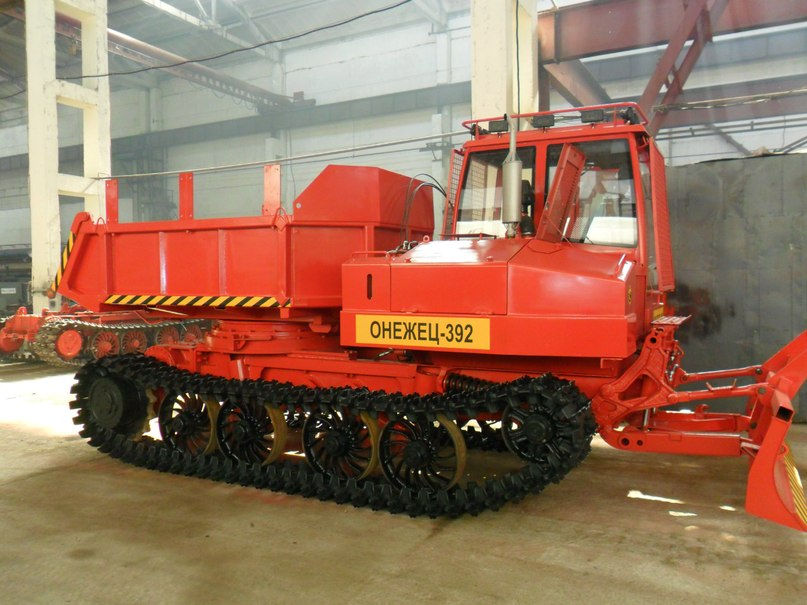
Onezhets-392

The company produces tracked all-terrain vehicles with amphibious, tractors tracked and skidders, forwarders, harvesters.

=== Tractors ===
- Onezhets-310
- Onezhets-380
- Onezhets-390
- Onezhets-392
- Onezhets-395
- Onezhets-400
- Onezhets-500 Amphibian

=== Skidders ===
- Onezhets-320
- Onezhets-330
- Onezhets-335
- Onezhets-420
- Onezhets-460

=== Forwarders ===
- Onezhets-350
- Onezhets-KH-7

=== Harvesters ===
- Onezhets-KH-451
- Onezhets-KH-8
