= Kugayama =

Town in Suginami ward, Tokyo

Coordinates: 35°43′15.14″N 139°35′45.82″E

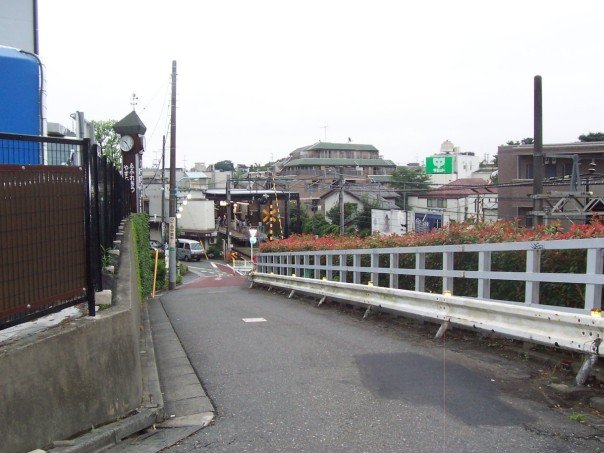
Looking down on Kugayama station

Kugayama (久我山) is a neighbourhood of Tokyo in Suginami ward, west of Shinjuku in Japan.

Kugayama is a residential community located along the Keiō Inokashira Line. It is served by local and express trains. The surrounding stations are Fujimigaoka and Mitakadai.
