= Concern Tractor Plants =

Russian machine building company

- Company type: PLC
- Industry: Defense and Machine
- Founded: 2003; 23 years ago
- Headquarters: Cheboksary, Chuvash Republic, Russia
- Area served: worldwide
- Key people: Albert Vladimirovich Bakov (Chairman); Mikhail Grigoryevich Bolotin (President)
- Products: Artillerys, Combat vehicles, Machines
- Owner: Rostec; Transport Components
- Number of employees: 45,000
- Website: tplants.com

Concern Tractor Plants (CTP, Russian: Концерн Тракторные заводы) is a leading Russian machine building company. CTP is one of the largest heavy mechanical engineering companies in the world.

== Overview ==
The company produces machinery for the industrial, military, agricultural, municipal building and railway sectors, including tractors, harvesting machinery, components and spare parts. CTP consolidates 14 industrial enterprises, three trading-service companies, a number of specialized Research and development offices and a Scientific Research Institute. The total number of employees is approximately 45,000 people. CTP operates in more than 40 countries worldwide. In 2007, the cumulative annual sales volume exceeded $1.35 billion, having increased 31.5 percent for the year. The company's headquarters are located in Cheboksary. Most of the company's factories are located in Russia.

In 2009, the holding company Machinery & Industrial Group N.V. placed shares on the Frankfurt Stock Exchange in the form of Global Depositary Receipts issued by Deutsche Bank. However, as of 2014, the sole shareholder of the company is Vnesheconombank.

== Structure ==
Companies of the holding:

- Altai Motor Plant, JSC
- Vladimir Motor and Tractor Plant, Ltd.
- Volgograd Machine Building Company, Ltd.
- Zauralsky Blacksmith’s Foundry, Ltd.
- Krasnoyarsk Combine Harvester Plant, JSC
- Kraslesmash, JSC
- Kurganmashzavod, JSC
- Lipetsk Caterpillar Tractor Plant, Ltd.
- Onezhsky Tractor Plant, Ltd.
- Promtractor, JSC
- Promtractor-Wagon, CJSC
- Promtractor-Promlit, Ltd
- SAREX, JSC
- Cheboksary Aggregate Works, JSC and Cheboksary Industrial Tractor Plant ChETRA
- Silvatec Skovmaskiner A/S
- Vogel&Noot Landmaschinen GmbH
- MIKONT, Ltd.
- Scientific Research Institute of Steel, JSC
- Special Machine Building Design Bureau, JSC
- Innovative Product Plant KTZ, Ltd.
