= 2017 in Russia =

- Decades: 1990s; 2000s; 2010s; 2020s
- See also: History of Russia; Timeline of Russian history; List of years in Russia

The following lists some of the events from the year 2017 in Russia.

== Incumbents ==
- President: Vladimir Putin
- Prime Minister: Dmitry Medvedev

=== Governors ===
- Amur Oblast: Alexander Kozlov (ER)
- Arkhangelsk Oblast: Igor Orlov (ER)
- Astrakhan Oblast: Alexander Zhilkin (ER)
- Belgorod Oblast: Yevgeny Savchenko (ER)
- Bryansk Oblast: Alexander Bogomaz (ER)
- Chelyabinsk Oblast: Boris Dubrovsky (ER)
- Irkutsk Oblast: Sergey Levchenko (CPRF)
- Ivanovo Oblast: Pavel Konkov (until October 10, ER), Stanislav Voskresensky (starting October 10, Independent / ER ally)
- Kaliningrad Oblast: Anton Alikhanov (ER)
- Kaluga Oblast: Anatoly Artamonov (ER)
- Kemerovo Oblast: Aman Tuleyev (ER)
- Kirov Oblast: Igor Vasilyev (ER)
- Kostroma Oblast: Sergey Sitnikov (ER)
- Kurgan Oblast: Alexei Kokorin (ER)
- Kursk Oblast: Aleksandr Mikhailov (ER)
- Leningrad Oblast: Alexander Drozdenko (ER)
- Lipetsk Oblast: Oleg Korolyov (ER)
- Magadan Oblast: Vladimir Pechnyony (ER)
- Moscow Oblast: Andrey Vorobyov (ER)
- Murmansk Oblast: Marina Kovtun (ER)
- Nizhny Novgorod Oblast: Valery Shantsev (until September 26, ER), Gleb Nikitin (starting September 26, ER)
- Novgorod Oblast: Sergey Mitin (until February 13, ER), Andrey Nikitin (starting February 13, ER)
- Novosibirsk Oblast: Vladimir Gorodetsky (until October 6, ER), Andrey Travnikov (starting October 6, ER)
- Omsk Oblast: Viktor Nazarov (until October 9, ER), Alexander Burkov (starting October 9, A Just Russia)
- Orenburg Oblast: Yury Berg (ER)
- Oryol Oblast: Vadim Potomsky (until October 5, CPRF), Andrey Klychkov (starting October 5, CPRF)
- Penza Oblast: Ivan Belozertsev (ER)
- Pskov Oblast: Andrey Turchak (until October 12, ER), Mikhail Vedernikov (starting October 12, ER)
- Rostov Oblast: Vasily Golubev (ER)
- Ryazan Oblast: Oleg Kovalyov (until February 14, ER), Nikolay Lyubimov (starting February 14, ER)
- Sakhalin Oblast: Oleg Kozhemyako (ER)
- Samara Oblast: Nikolai Merkushkin (until September 25, ER), Dmitry Azarov (starting September 25, ER)
- Saratov Oblast: Valery Radaev (ER)
- Smolensk Oblast: Alexey Ostrovsky (LDPR)
- Tambov Oblast: Aleksandr Nikitin (ER)
- Tomsk Oblast: Sergey Zhvachkin (ER)
- Tula Oblast: Alexey Dyumin (Independent / ER ally)
- Tver Oblast: Igor Rudenya (ER)
- Tyumen Oblast: Vladimir Yakushev (ER)
- Ulyanovsk Oblast: Sergey Morozov (ER)
- Vladimir Oblast: Svetlana Orlova (ER)
- Volgograd Oblast: Andrey Bocharov (ER)
- Vologda Oblast: Oleg Kuvshinnikov (ER)
- Voronezh Oblast: Alexey Gordeyev (until December 25, ER), Alexander Gusev (starting December 25, ER)
- Yaroslavl Oblast: Dmitry Mironov (Independent / ER ally)
- Jewish Autonomous Oblast: Alexander Levintal (ER)

== Events ==
=== January ===
- 6 January - Russia begins to withdraw forces from Syria starting with an aircraft carrier group. Meanwhile, a declassified report in the US claims that President Putin ordered a campaign to influence last year's election against Democratic candidate, Hillary Clinton.
- 9 January - The death toll of people who died from alcohol poisoning in Irkutsk rises to 76.
- 20 January - A rally was held against the transfer of Saint Isaac's Cathedral to the Russian Orthodox Church in St. Petersburg.
- 27 January - Russian lawmakers voted, 380–3, to decriminalize certain forms of domestic violence. Under the new law, first-time offenses that do not result in "serious bodily harm" carry a maximum fine of 30,000 rubles, up to 15 days' administrative arrest, or up to 120 hours of community service.

=== February ===
- 8 February – The Russian government gives names to five previously unnamed Kuril Islands in Sakhalin Oblast: Derevyanko Island (after Kuzma Derevyanko), Gnechko Island (after Alexey Gnechko), Gromyko Island (after Andrei Gromyko), Farkhutdinov Island (after Igor Farkhutdinov) and Shchetinina Island (after Anna Shchetinina).

=== March ===
- 26 March - Protests against alleged corruption in the federal Russian government took place simultaneously in many cities across the country. They were triggered by the lack of proper response from the Russian authorities to the published investigative film He Is Not Dimon to You, which has garnered more than 20 million views on YouTube.

=== April ===
- 3 April – Saint Petersburg Metro bombing.
- 20 April – The Russian government has prohibited Jehovah's Witnesses in all of Russia, going in favor of the Ministry of Justice.
- 29 April - Dozens are detained at protests against a re-election of Putin, with at least 30 arrested in St Petersburg and 16 in Kemerovo, and over 125 detentions being reported.
- 30 April – Russian Grand Prix F-1

=== May ===
- 29 May – 15 people die and around 200 are injured following a severe thunderstorm in Moscow and its suburbs.

=== June ===
- The number of people fined or arrested for alleged violations of public gathering regulations is 2.5 times higher in the first half of 2017 alone than in the entire year of 2016.
- 1–3 June – St. Petersburg International Economic Forum
- 10 June – A gunman, 49-year-old Igor Zenkov, kills four people before being shot dead by local police and the National Guard during a special operation in the township of Kratovo, Moscow Oblast.
- 17 June – 2 July – 2017 FIFA Confederations Cup
- 22–29 June – Moscow International Film Festival

=== September ===
- 1 September – Russian president Vladimir Putin expelled 755 diplomats response to United States sanctions takes effect.
- 10 September
  - 2017 Karelia head election
  - 2017 Russian elections

=== October ===
- 2 October – Iran nuclear deal cover by Russia official, US ambassador to UN warns, Russia is backing shield prevent to pass agreement to United States president, Donald Trump.

=== November ===
- 1 November - 18-year-old Andrey Emelyannikov stabbed 44-year-old Sergey Danilov before killing himself.
- 5 November - 260 anti-government demonstrators are arrested in Moscow.
- 26 November - Polina Bogusevich wins the Junior Eurovision Song Contest 2017 with the song, Wings.

=== December ===
- 5 December - The International Olympic Committee bans Russia from the 2018 Winter Olympics in PyeongChang due to evidence of systemic cheating at the 2014 Winter Olympics in Sochi. (Yahoo!)
- December - Moscow has no sunlight in December, setting a record. Yakutia drops below −60 °C, and Moscow's temp is −7 °C.

=== 2017 ===
- Russia's CPI hits a record-low 2.5% in 2017 and is expected to return to 4% the following year.

== Deaths ==
- 2 January – Viktor Tsaryov, football player and coach (b. 1931)
- 11 January – Nikolay Neprimerov, physicist (b. 1921)
- 17 January – Aleksandr Ezhevsky, engineer and politician (b. 1915)
- 3 February – Zoya Bulgakova, actress (b. 1914)
- 4 February – Georgy Taratorkin, actor (b. 1945)
- 8 March - Dmitry Mezhevich, actor and songwriter (b. 1940)
- 16 March - Konstantin Stupin, Soviet and Russian rock musician and actor (b. 1972)
- 1 April - Yevgeny Yevtushenko, poet (b. 1933)
- 1 May - Anatoly Aleksin, writer and poet (b. 1924)
- 20 May – Alexander Alexandrovich Volkov, 1st President of the Udmurt Republic (b. 1951)
- 2 June – Oskar Kaibyshev, scientist (b. 1939)
- 8 June – Zoya Krylova, journalist and politician (b. 1944)
- 4 July – Daniil Granin, author (b. 1919
- 15 August – Pavel Egorov, pianist (b. 1948)
- 29 August – Evdokia Bobyleva, teacher (b. 1919)
- 2 September – Viktor Cherepkov, politician, mayor of Vladivostok (b. 1942)
- 10 September – Leila Mardanshina, oil and gas operator (b. 1927)

== Predicted and scheduled events ==
=== August ===
- 15–20 August – MAKS Air Show

=== September ===
- 24 September – Moscow Marathon
- 28 September – 1 October – IgroMir

== See also ==
- List of Russian films of 2017
- 2017–2018 Russian protests
- 2017 Russian Circuit Racing Series
