= 2019 in Russia =

- Decades: 1990s; 2000s; 2010s; 2020s
- See also: History of Russia; Timeline of Russian history; List of years in Russia

The following lists events from the year 2019 in Russia.

== Incumbents ==
- President: Vladimir Putin
- Prime Minister: Dmitry Medvedev

=== Governors ===
- Amur Oblast: Vasily Orlov (ER)
- Arkhangelsk Oblast: Igor Orlov (ER)
- Astrakhan Oblast: Sergey Morozov (Acting, Independent, until June 5), Igor Babushkin (ER, starting June 5)
- Belgorod Oblast: Yevgeny Savchenko (ER)
- Bryansk Oblast: Alexander Bogomaz (ER)
- Chelyabinsk Oblast: Boris Dubrovsky (until March 19, ER), Alexey Teksler (starting March 19, ER)
- Irkutsk Oblast: Sergey Levchenko (until December 12, CPRF), Igor Kobzev (Acting, Independent, starting December 12)
- Ivanovo Oblast: Stanislav Voskresensky (ER)
- Kaliningrad Oblast: Anton Alikhanov (ER)
- Kaluga Oblast: Anatoly Artamonov (ER)
- Kemerovo Oblast: Sergey Tsivilyov (ER)
- Kirov Oblast: Igor Vasilyev (ER)
- Kostroma Oblast: Sergey Sitnikov (ER)
- Kurgan Oblast: Vadim Shumkov (ER)
- Kursk Oblast: Roman Starovoyt (ER)
- Leningrad Oblast: Alexander Drozdenko (ER)
- Lipetsk Oblast: Igor Artamonov (ER)
- Magadan Oblast: Sergey Nosov (ER)
- Moscow Oblast: Andrey Vorobyov (ER)
- Murmansk Oblast: Marina Kovtun (until March 21, ER), Andrey Chibis (starting March 21, ER)
- Nizhny Novgorod Oblast: Gleb Nikitin (ER)
- Novgorod Oblast: Andrey Nikitin (ER)
- Novosibirsk Oblast: Andrey Travnikov (ER)
- Omsk Oblast: Alexander Burkov (A Just Russia)
- Orenburg Oblast: Yury Berg (until March 21, ER), Denis Pasler (starting March 21, ER)
- Oryol Oblast: Andrey Klychkov (CPRF)
- Penza Oblast: Ivan Belozertsev (ER)
- Pskov Oblast: Mikhail Vedernikov (ER)
- Rostov Oblast: Vasily Golubev (ER)
- Ryazan Oblast: Nikolay Lyubimov (ER)
- Sakhalin Oblast: Valery Limarenko (ER)
- Samara Oblast: Dmitry Azarov (ER)
- Saratov Oblast: Valery Radaev (ER)
- Smolensk Oblast: Alexey Ostrovsky (LDPR)
- Tambov Oblast: Aleksandr Nikitin (ER)
- Tomsk Oblast: Sergey Zhvachkin (ER)
- Tula Oblast: Alexey Dyumin (Independent / ER ally)
- Tver Oblast: Igor Rudenya (ER)
- Tyumen Oblast: Aleksandr Moor (ER)
- Ulyanovsk Oblast: Sergey Morozov (ER)
- Vladimir Oblast: Vladimir Sipyagin (LDPR)
- Volgograd Oblast: Andrey Bocharov (ER)
- Vologda Oblast: Oleg Kuvshinnikov (ER)
- Voronezh Oblast: Alexander Gusev (ER)
- Yaroslavl Oblast: Dmitry Mironov (Independent / ER ally)
- Jewish Autonomous Oblast: Alexander Levintal (until December 30, ER), Rostislav Goldstein (starting December 30, ER)

== Events ==
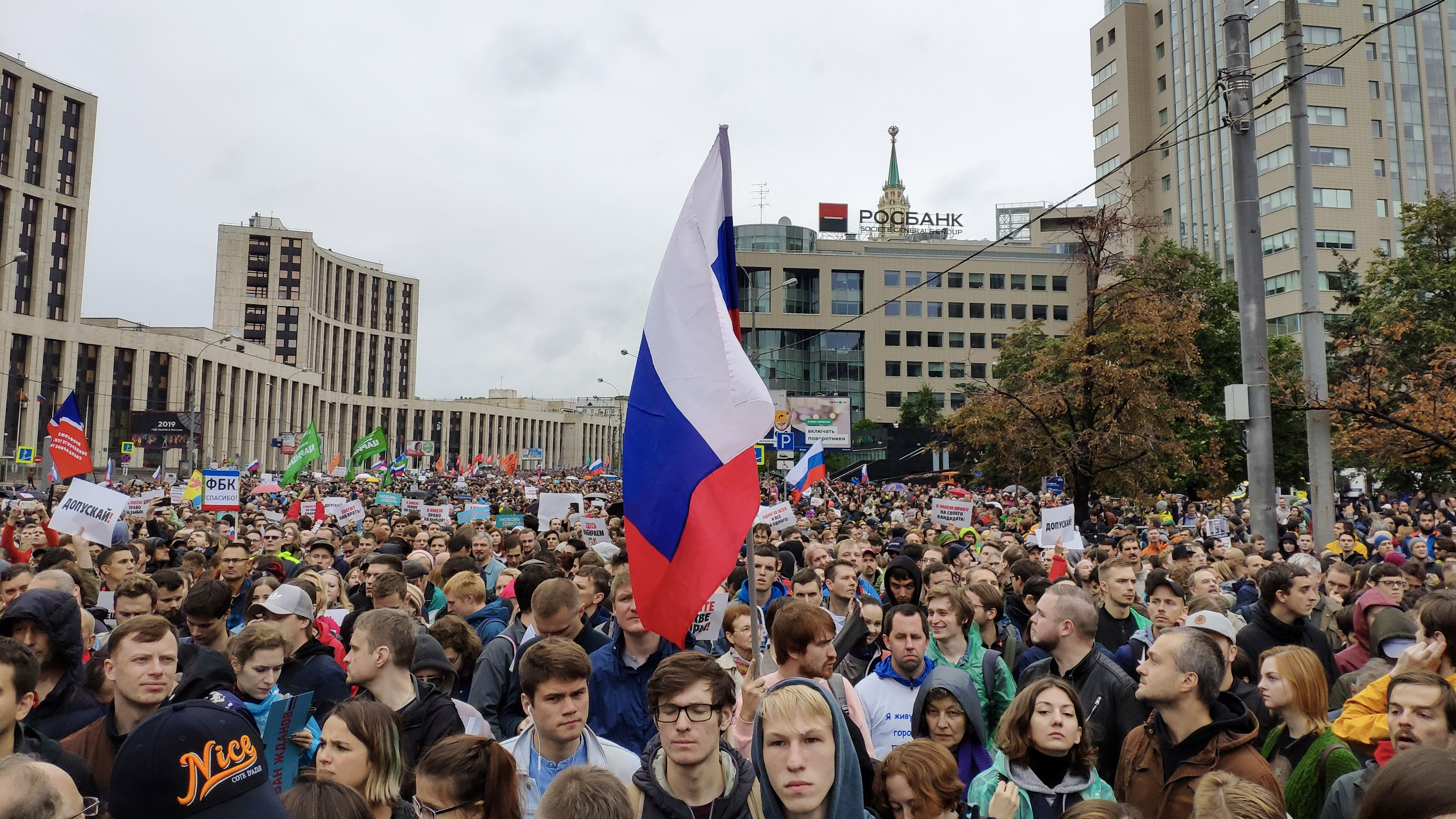
2019 Moscow protests

- February – The Russian military launches a nationwide tour to parade war trophies from its intervention in the Syrian civil war.
- 14 February – Michael Calvey, the founder of the Moscow-based private equity firm Baring Vostok Capital Partners, was arrested on suspicion of alleged embezzlement.
- 2–12 March – 2019 Winter Universiade, a multi-sport event in Krasnoyarsk, Russia.
- 6 March – the Russian Federal Assembly passed a law criminalising publication of online statements that are found "indecent" or "disrespectful" towards Russian state or government officials (including the president), stipulating fines of up to 100,000 roubles for first-time offenders, and 200,000 roubles or up to 15 days imprisonment for repeat.
- 5 May – Aeroflot Flight 1492 crashes and bursts into flames at Sheremetyevo International Airport, killing 41 people on board.
- 28 May– in the village of Bolshevik in Volsk, Russia 15-year-old seventh-grader Daniil Pulkin threw two Molotov cocktails and hit a 12-year-old girl on the head with an axe, after which he fled the scene of the crime. The attacker was detained the same day.
- July–September – 2019 Moscow protests caused by the situation with the 2019 Moscow City Duma elections.
- 8 August – Nyonoksa radiation accident causes 5 immediate deaths.
- 15 August – Ural Airlines Flight 178 crashed, all on board survived.
- 7 September – Filmmaker Oleh Sentsov and 66 others are released in a prisoner exchange between Ukraine and Russia.

== Births ==
- 21 May – Tengku Ismail Leon Petra, son of Muhammad V of Kelantan and Oksana Voevodina.

== Deaths ==
=== February ===
- 3 February – Detsl, hip hop artist.
- 4 February – Evgeniy Aleksandrov, footballer (b. 1952)
- 8 February – Sergei Yursky, actor (b. 1935)
- 18 February – Valentina Dimitrieva, farm worker (b. 1937).

=== March ===
- 1 March – Zhores Alferov, scientist (b. 1930)

=== April ===
- 27 April – Aleksey Lebed, politician (b. 1955)

=== May ===
- 9 May – Sergey Dorenko, journalist (b. 1959)

=== July ===
- 3 July – Arseny Mironov, aeronautical engineer (b. 1917)

=== October ===
- 2 October – Evdokia Gaer educator, politician and human rights activist (b. 1934)
