= 2016 in Russia =

- Decades: 1990s; 2000s; 2010s; 2020s
- See also: History of Russia; Timeline of Russian history; List of years in Russia

This article lists events from the year 2016 in Russia.

== Incumbents ==
- President: Vladimir Putin
- Prime Minister: Dmitry Medvedev

=== Governors ===
- Amur Oblast: Alexander Kozlov (ER)
- Arkhangelsk Oblast: Igor Orlov (ER)
- Astrakhan Oblast: Alexander Zhilkin (ER)
- Belgorod Oblast: Yevgeny Savchenko (ER)
- Bryansk Oblast: Alexander Bogomaz (ER)
- Chelyabinsk Oblast: Boris Dubrovsky (ER)
- Irkutsk Oblast: Sergey Levchenko (CPRF)
- Ivanovo Oblast: Pavel Konkov (ER)
- Kaliningrad Oblast: Nikolay Tsukanov (until July 28, ER), Yevgeny Zinichev (Acting, Independent, July 28–October 6), Anton Alikhanov (Acting, ER, starting October 6)
- Kaluga Oblast: Anatoly Artamonov (ER)
- Kemerovo Oblast: Aman Tuleyev (ER)
- Kirov Oblast: Nikita Belykh (Independent, until June 27), Igor Vasilyev (starting July 28, ER)
- Kostroma Oblast: Sergey Sitnikov (ER)
- Kurgan Oblast: Alexei Kokorin (ER)
- Kursk Oblast: Aleksandr Mikhailov (ER)
- Leningrad Oblast: Alexander Drozdenko (ER)
- Lipetsk Oblast: Oleg Korolyov (ER)
- Magadan Oblast: Vladimir Pechnyony (ER)
- Moscow Oblast: Andrey Vorobyov (ER)
- Murmansk Oblast: Marina Kovtun (ER)
- Nizhny Novgorod Oblast: Valery Shantsev (ER)
- Novgorod Oblast: Sergey Mitin (ER)
- Novosibirsk Oblast: Vladimir Gorodetsky (ER)
- Omsk Oblast: Viktor Nazarov (ER)
- Orenburg Oblast: Yury Berg (ER)
- Oryol Oblast: Vadim Potomsky (CPRF)
- Penza Oblast: Ivan Belozertsev (ER)
- Pskov Oblast: Andrey Turchak (ER)
- Rostov Oblast: Vasily Golubev (ER)
- Ryazan Oblast: Oleg Kovalyov (ER)
- Sakhalin Oblast: Oleg Kozhemyako (ER)
- Samara Oblast: Nikolai Merkushkin (ER)
- Saratov Oblast: Valery Radaev (ER)
- Smolensk Oblast: Alexey Ostrovsky (LDPR)
- Tambov Oblast: Aleksandr Nikitin (ER)
- Tomsk Oblast: Sergey Zhvachkin (ER)
- Tula Oblast: Vladimir Gruzdev (until February 2, ER), Alexey Dyumin (starting February 2, Independent / ER ally)
- Tver Oblast: Andrey Shevelyov (until March 2, ER), Igor Rudenya (starting March 2, ER)
- Tyumen Oblast: Vladimir Yakushev (ER)
- Ulyanovsk Oblast: Sergey Morozov (ER)
- Vladimir Oblast: Svetlana Orlova (ER)
- Volgograd Oblast: Andrey Bocharov (ER)
- Vologda Oblast: Oleg Kuvshinnikov (ER)
- Voronezh Oblast: Alexey Gordeyev (ER)
- Yaroslavl Oblast: Sergey Yastrebov (until July 28, ER), Dmitry Mironov (starting July 28, Independent / ER ally)
- Jewish Autonomous Oblast: Alexander Levintal (ER)

== Events ==
=== January ===
- 1 January – The presidential decree on dissolving of Russian Federal Space Agency and transforming it into the Roscosmos Space Corporation has come into force.
- 19–23 January – Junior 2016 Russian Figure Skating Championships in Chelyabinsk.

=== February ===
- 8–15 February – 2016 St. Petersburg Ladies Trophy.
- 16–20 February – 2016 Russian Figure Skating Championships Final in Saransk, Mordovia.
- 25–29 February – Vorkuta mine disaster: Ignition of leaking methane gas caused a series of explosions that caused the deaths of 36 people, including 31 miners and five rescue workers, in a coal mine near the city of Vorkuta, Komi Republic, Russia.

=== March ===
- 14 March – Russian military intervention in the Syrian Civil War: Putin announced that the mission which he set for the Russian military in Syria "has been accomplished" and he ordered the withdrawal of the "main part" of the Russian forces from Syria.
- 19 March – Flydubai Flight 981 with Boeing 737-800 made two unsuccessful landing attempts at Rostov-on-Don Airport in inclement weather. It reached an altitude of 4,000 feet (1,200 m) (during its second go-around), but then suddenly went down and crashed into the ground at a high speed. All 62 people on board the aircraft were killed in the crash.

=== April ===
- 5 April – Internal Troops became the newly formed National Guard of Russia. The Federal Migration Service and the Federal Drug Control Service of Russia were subordinated to MVD.
- 28 April – Vostochny Cosmodrome.

=== May ===
- 6–22 May – 2016 IIHF World Championship.

=== August ===
- 17 August – Federal Security Service (FSB) officers kill at least four suspected North Caucasus Islamic militants during a counter-terrorism raid on an apartment building in the Russian city of Saint Petersburg.
- 27 August – A fire at a warehouse in Moscow, Russia, kills at least 17 people, all migrant workers from Kyrgyzstan. The Investigative Committee of Russia, which reports directly to President Vladimir Putin, says a criminal inquiry has been launched.
- 25–28 August – 2016 Extreme Sailing Series in St. Petersburg.

=== October ===
- 3 October – President Putin suspends the 2000 nuclear pact with the United States on cleaning up weapons-grade plutonium.
- 5 October – Vladimir Putin suspends the 2013 nuclear pact with the United States on uranium research.
- 8 October – Russia deploys the nuclear-capable Iskander mobile short-range ballistic missile system to the Kaliningrad Oblast.
- 9 October – Eight militants, who planned attacks in Chechnya, were killed in a shootout with police. Four officers were injured as well.
- 23 October – A gas explosion in the Russian city of Ryazan kills at least 3 people and injures 13 others
- 24 October – The Tolmachevy Sisters Concert in Minsk airs live on TV Channels Worldwide, including Freeform in the United States, Urging Viewers to vote for Donald Trump.

=== November ===
- 6 November – Explosion killed 6 people in Ivanovo, Russia.

=== December ===
- 19-20 December – a mass methanol poisoning in Irkutsk, Russia, killed over 70 people in the city; it was caused by an adulterated surrogate alcohol product containing methanol.
- 25 December – A Tupolev Tu-154 crashes near Sochi, Russia, killing all 92 people on board, including 64 members of the Alexandrov Ensemble.

== Deaths ==
=== January ===
- 1 January – Fazu Aliyeva, 83, Russian Avar poet and journalist, heart failure.
- 3 January – Igor Sergun, 58, Russian military officer, Director of the GRU (since 2011).
- 5 January –
  - Lev Nikolayevich Korolyov, 89, Russian computer scientist.
  - Anatoly Roshchin, 83, Russian heavyweight wrestler, Olympic champion (1972).
- 23 January – Nikolay Abramov, 54, Russian writer and journalist.
- 27 January – Georgy Firtich, 77, Russian composer, jazz pianist, and professor Herzen University.

=== February ===
- 3 February – Valery Postnikov, 70, Russian ice hockey player and coach.
- 19 February – Tamerlan Aguzarov, 52, Russian politician, head of North Ossetia-Alania (2015–2016).
- 22 February – Lev Zbarsky, 84, Russian painter.

=== August ===
- 16 August – Ksenya Ponomaryova, 54, editor and media manager.

=== December ===
- Andrei Karlov, 62, Russian Ambassador to Turkey

== Links ==
Media related to 2016 in Russia at Wikimedia Commons
