= 2018 in Russia =

- Decades: 1990s; 2000s; 2010s; 2020s
- See also: History of Russia; Timeline of Russian history; List of years in Russia

Events in the year 2018 in Russia.

== Incumbents ==
- President: Vladimir Putin
- Prime Minister: Dmitry Medvedev

=== Governors ===
- Amur Oblast: Alexander Kozlov (until May 18, ER), Vasily Orlov (starting May 30, ER)
- Arkhangelsk Oblast: Igor Orlov (ER)
- Astrakhan Oblast: Alexander Zhilkin (until September 26, ER), Sergey Morozov (Acting, Independent, starting September 26)
- Belgorod Oblast: Yevgeny Savchenko (ER)
- Bryansk Oblast: Alexander Bogomaz (ER)
- Chelyabinsk Oblast: Boris Dubrovsky (ER)
- Irkutsk Oblast: Sergey Levchenko (CPRF)
- Ivanovo Oblast: Stanislav Voskresensky (ER)
- Kaliningrad Oblast: Anton Alikhanov (ER)
- Kaluga Oblast: Anatoly Artamonov (ER)
- Kemerovo Oblast: Aman Tuleyev (until April 1, ER), Sergey Tsivilyov (starting April 1, ER)
- Kirov Oblast: Igor Vasilyev (ER)
- Kostroma Oblast: Sergey Sitnikov (ER)
- Kurgan Oblast: Alexei Kokorin (until October 2, ER), Vadim Shumkov (starting October 2, Independent / ER ally)
- Kursk Oblast: Aleksandr Mikhailov (until October 11, ER), Roman Starovoyt (starting October 11, ER)
- Leningrad Oblast: Alexander Drozdenko (ER)
- Lipetsk Oblast: Oleg Korolyov (until October 2, ER), Igor Artamonov (starting October 2, ER)
- Magadan Oblast: Vladimir Pechnyony (until May 28, ER), Sergey Nosov (starting May 28, ER)
- Moscow Oblast: Andrey Vorobyov (ER)
- Murmansk Oblast: Marina Kovtun (ER)
- Nizhny Novgorod Oblast: Gleb Nikitin (ER)
- Novgorod Oblast: Andrey Nikitin (ER)
- Novosibirsk Oblast: Andrey Travnikov (ER)
- Omsk Oblast: Alexander Burkov (A Just Russia)
- Orenburg Oblast: Yury Berg (ER)
- Oryol Oblast: Andrey Klychkov (CPRF)
- Penza Oblast: Ivan Belozertsev (ER)
- Pskov Oblast: Mikhail Vedernikov (ER)
- Rostov Oblast: Vasily Golubev (ER)
- Ryazan Oblast: Nikolay Lyubimov (ER)
- Sakhalin Oblast: Oleg Kozhemyako (until December 7, ER), Valery Limarenko (Acting, Independent / ER ally, starting December 7)
- Samara Oblast: Dmitry Azarov (ER)
- Saratov Oblast: Valery Radaev (ER)
- Smolensk Oblast: Alexey Ostrovsky (LDPR)
- Tambov Oblast: Aleksandr Nikitin (ER)
- Tomsk Oblast: Sergey Zhvachkin (ER)
- Tula Oblast: Alexey Dyumin (Independent / ER ally)
- Tver Oblast: Igor Rudenya (ER)
- Tyumen Oblast: Vladimir Yakushev (until May 18, ER), Aleksandr Moor (starting May 29, ER)
- Ulyanovsk Oblast: Sergey Morozov (ER)
- Vladimir Oblast: Svetlana Orlova (until October 8, ER), Vladimir Sipyagin (starting October 8, LDPR)
- Volgograd Oblast: Andrey Bocharov (ER)
- Vologda Oblast: Oleg Kuvshinnikov (ER)
- Voronezh Oblast: Alexander Gusev (ER)
- Yaroslavl Oblast: Dmitry Mironov (Independent / ER ally)
- Jewish Autonomous Oblast: Alexander Levintal (ER)

== Events ==
=== January ===
- 15 January - Two men aged 16, attacked students and a teacher with knives after which they attempted suicide. As a result of the attack, 15 people were injured, including the perpetrators.

=== February ===
- 11 February – Saratov Airlines Flight 703 crashed shortly after take-off, killing all 71 people on board.

=== March ===
- 15–17 March – Sergey Lavrov has announced that Russia will expel diplomats from the United Kingdom because of the expulsion of 23 Russian envoys due to the poisoning of Sergei Skripal and Yulia Skripal. The Russian foreign ministry is to expel 23 British diplomats amid tensions over the nerve agent attack in the United Kingdom.
- 18 March – In the Russian presidential election, Vladimir Putin is elected for a fourth term, winning 73.9% of the vote.
- 25 March - 2018 Kemerovo fire

=== May ===
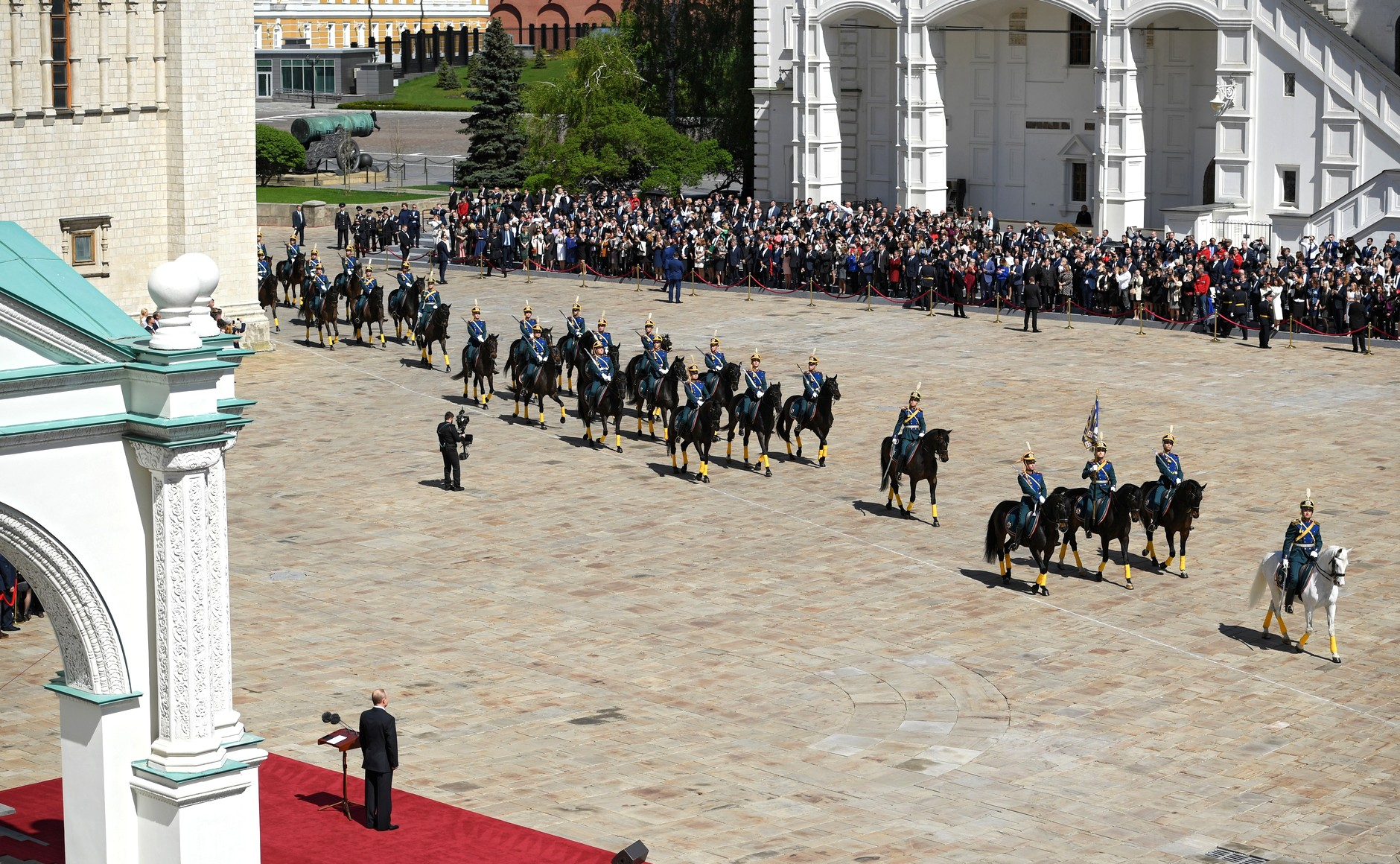
The inaugural military parade.

- 5 May – Thousand Protest rally in 97 cities including Moscow and St Petersburg, against Vladimir Putin for winning a fourth term in the Russian President Election.
- 7 May - Vladimir Putin sworn in for a fourth term as President of Russia in the Hall of the Order of St. Andrew of the Grand Kremlin Palace.
- 10 May - Opening of Crimean Bridge.

=== June ===
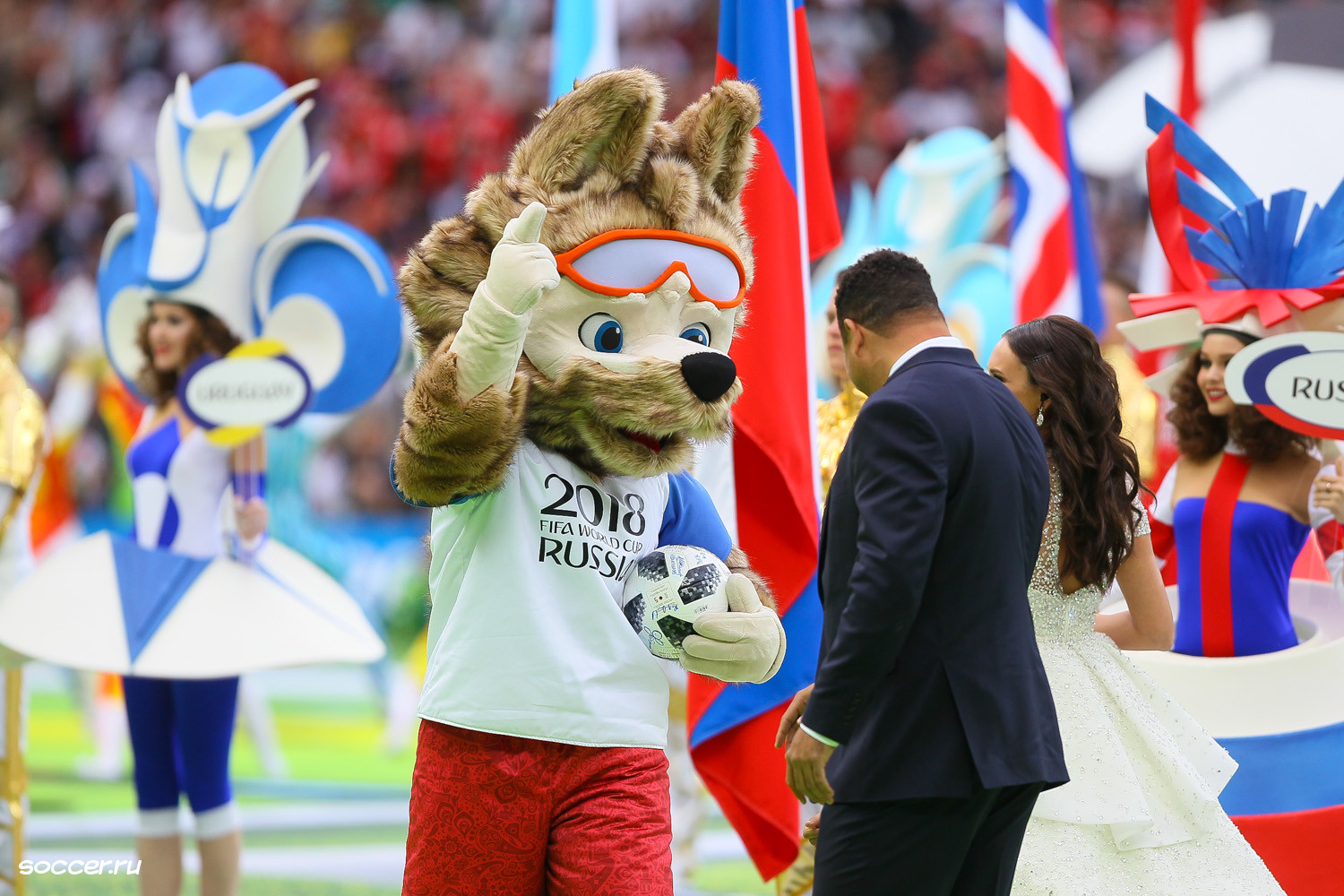
Zabivaka, the official mascot of the World Cup.

- 14 June – The opening ceremonies of the 2018 FIFA World Cup.
- 19 June – the Russian State Duma adopted a bill that made education in all languages but Russian optional, overruling previous laws by ethnic autonomies, and reducing instruction in minority languages to only two hours a week. This bill has been likened by some commentators, such as in Foreign Affairs, to a policy of Russification.

=== July ===
- 1 July – Several thousand people protested across Russia against a hugely unpopular government decision to hike the pension age that has led to a record slump in President Vladimir Putin's approval ratings. No protests were held in World Cup host cities due to a regulation banning protest in the cities for the duration of the tournament.
  - Russia knocks out Spain from the World Cup after winning a penalty shootout.
- 15 July - Closing ceremony of 2018 FIFA World Cup
- 28 July – More than 10,000 people attended a rally in the capital, Moscow against government plans to increase the retirement age rise.

=== August ===
- 2 August – More than 9,000 people attended a rally against government plans to increase the retirement age rise.

=== September ===
- 11 September - Pussy Riot's manager Pyotr Verzilov mysteriously fell critically ill after a court hearing in Moscow. This was the same day that he was slated to have received vital information from 'foreign services' about the death of several journalists reporting on the Wagner Battalion's actions in the Central African Republic.
- 11 September - Then Russian Minister of Justice Alexander Konovalov announced an expansion on 'extremist' materials, including the addition of 4,507 books, videos, websites, social media pages, and musical compositions. This was recorded to be a seismic, 200 item increase from the prior year.

=== October ===
- 26 October - Marking the first of approximately 36 public, Hip-Hop concerts, a three-month period of cancelled performances would begin. Dmitry Kuznetsov, or Husky, had his concert in Togliatti cancelled following a letter from the Prosecutor's office rejecting some of the lyrics of songs that were to be performed that evening due to the presence of 'cannibalism.'

=== December ===
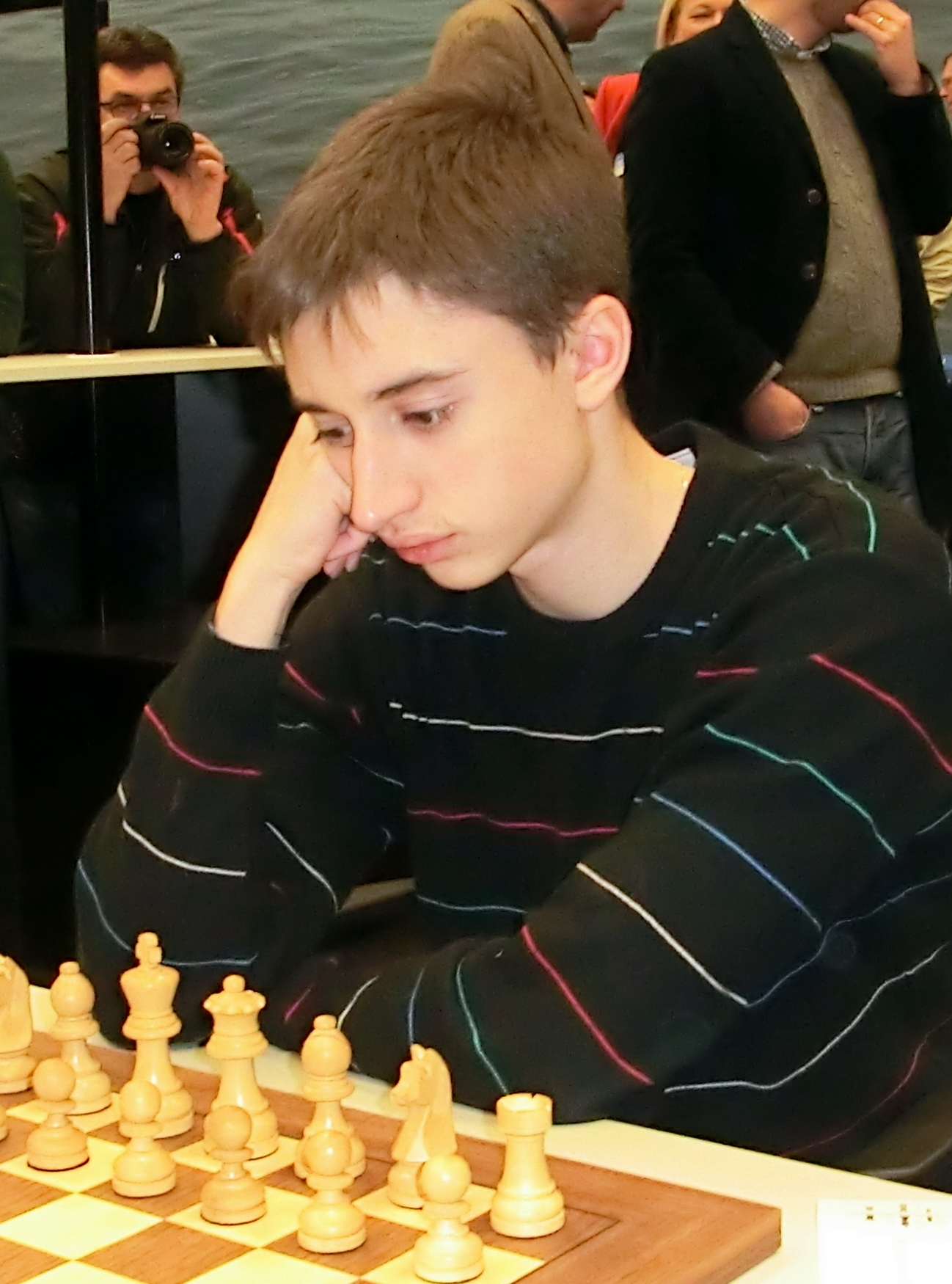
Daniil Dubov, world champion in rapid chess

- 26–28 December – The 2018 World Rapid Chess Championship was held in Saint Petersburg. Winner and world champion was Daniil Dubov from Russia, ahead of Shakhriyar Mamedyarov and Hikaru Nakamura.

== Deaths ==
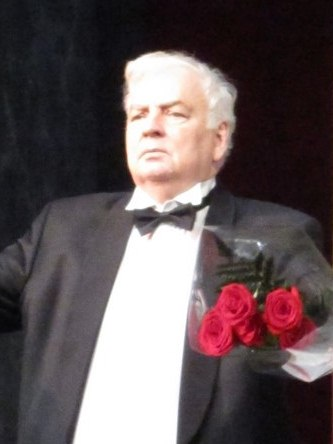
Mikhail Derzhavin

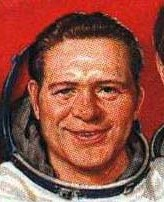
Vladimir Lyakhov

=== January ===
- 3 January – Igor Strelbin, footballer (b. 1974).
- 9 January – Robert Minlos, mathematician (b. 1931)
- 9 January – Alexander Vedernikov, singer and teacher (b. 1927)
- 9 January – Valeri Matyunin, footballer (b. 1960)
- 10 January – Mikhail Derzhavin, actor (b. 1936)
- 15 January – Viktor Anpilov, politician and trade unionist (b. 1945)
- 25 January – Lyudmila Senchina, soprano singer (b. 1948 or 1950)

=== February ===
- 21 February – Valentin Afraimovich, mathematician (b.1945)
- 21 February – Sergei Aleksandrov, footballer (b. 1973)
- 26 February – Tatyana Karpova, actress (b. 1916)

=== March ===
- 22 March – Khozh-Akhmed Bersanov, Chechen writer and ethnographer (b. 1926)
- 26 March – Sergei Mavrodi, financial fraudster and a deputy of the State Duma (b. 1955)
- 27 March – Victor Kalashnikov, gun designer (b. 1942)
- 28 March – Oleg Anofriyev, actor, singer, songwriter, film director and poet (b. 1930)

=== April ===
- 16 April – Maxim Borodin, 32, Russian Journalist (b. 1986)
- 19 April – Vladimir Lyakhov, cosmonaut (b. 1941)
- 21 April – Nina Doroshina, actress (b. 1934)
- 22 April – Ivan P. Neumyvakin, physician (b. 1928)

=== May ===
- 21 May – Aleksandr Askoldov, actor and film director (b. 1932)

=== July ===
- 3 July – Boris Orlov, gymnastics coach (b. 1945).
- 5 July – Evgeny Golod, mathematician who proved the Golod–Shafarevich theorem on class field towers (b. 1935).
- 8 July – Tazir Kariyev, footballer (b. 1989).
- 10 July – Andrei Suslin, mathematician who contributed to algebraic K-theory and its connections with algebraic geometry (b. 1950).
- 27 July – Vladimir Voinovich, writer (b. 1932).

=== August ===
- 3 August – Valentina Dorofeeva, industrialist (b. 1937).

== See also ==
- 2017 in Russia
- 2019 in Russia
- 21st century
- Elections in Russia
- Russian Activities and Intentions in Recent Elections
