= 2020 in Russia =

- Decades: 2000s; 2010s; 2020s
- See also: History of Russia; Timeline of Russian history; List of years in Russia

Events in the year 2020 in the Russian Federation.

== Incumbents ==
- President: Vladimir Putin
- Prime Minister: Dmitry Medvedev (until January 16); Mikhail Mishustin (since January 16); Andrey Belousov (acting: April 30 to May 19)

=== Governors ===
- Amur Oblast: Vasily Orlov (ER)
- Arkhangelsk Oblast: Igor Orlov (until April 2, ER), Alexander Tsybulsky (starting April 2, ER)
- Astrakhan Oblast: Igor Babushkin (ER)
- Belgorod Oblast: Yevgeny Savchenko (until September 22, ER), Denis Butsayev (Acting, Independent, September 22–November 18), Vyacheslav Gladkov (starting November 18, ER)
- Bryansk Oblast: Alexander Bogomaz (ER)
- Chelyabinsk Oblast: Alexey Teksler (ER)
- Irkutsk Oblast: Igor Kobzev (ER)
- Ivanovo Oblast: Stanislav Voskresensky (ER)
- Kaliningrad Oblast: Anton Alikhanov (ER)
- Kaluga Oblast: Anatoly Artamonov (until February 13, ER), Vladislav Shapsha (starting February 13, ER)
- Kemerovo Oblast: Sergey Tsivilyov (ER)
- Kirov Oblast: Igor Vasilyev (ER)
- Kostroma Oblast: Sergey Sitnikov (ER)
- Kurgan Oblast: Vadim Shumkov (ER)
- Kursk Oblast: Roman Starovoyt (ER)
- Leningrad Oblast: Alexander Drozdenko (ER)
- Lipetsk Oblast: Igor Artamonov (ER)
- Magadan Oblast: Sergey Nosov (ER)
- Moscow Oblast: Andrey Vorobyov (ER)
- Murmansk Oblast: Andrey Chibis (ER)
- Nizhny Novgorod Oblast: Gleb Nikitin (ER)
- Novgorod Oblast: Andrey Nikitin (ER)
- Novosibirsk Oblast: Andrey Travnikov (ER)
- Omsk Oblast: Alexander Burkov (A Just Russia)
- Orenburg Oblast: Denis Pasler (ER)
- Oryol Oblast: Andrey Klychkov (CPRF)
- Penza Oblast: Ivan Belozertsev (ER)
- Pskov Oblast: Mikhail Vedernikov (ER)
- Rostov Oblast: Vasily Golubev (ER)
- Ryazan Oblast: Nikolay Lyubimov (ER)
- Sakhalin Oblast: Valery Limarenko (ER)
- Samara Oblast: Dmitry Azarov (ER)
- Saratov Oblast: Valery Radaev (ER)
- Smolensk Oblast: Alexey Ostrovsky (LDPR)
- Tambov Oblast: Aleksandr Nikitin (ER)
- Tomsk Oblast: Sergey Zhvachkin (ER)
- Tula Oblast: Alexey Dyumin (Independent / ER ally)
- Tver Oblast: Igor Rudenya (ER)
- Tyumen Oblast: Aleksandr Moor (ER)
- Ulyanovsk Oblast: Sergey Morozov (ER)
- Vladimir Oblast: Vladimir Sipyagin (LDPR)
- Volgograd Oblast: Andrey Bocharov (ER)
- Vologda Oblast: Oleg Kuvshinnikov (ER)
- Voronezh Oblast: Alexander Gusev (ER)
- Yaroslavl Oblast: Dmitry Mironov (Independent / ER ally)
- Jewish Autonomous Oblast: Rostislav Goldstein (ER)

== Events ==
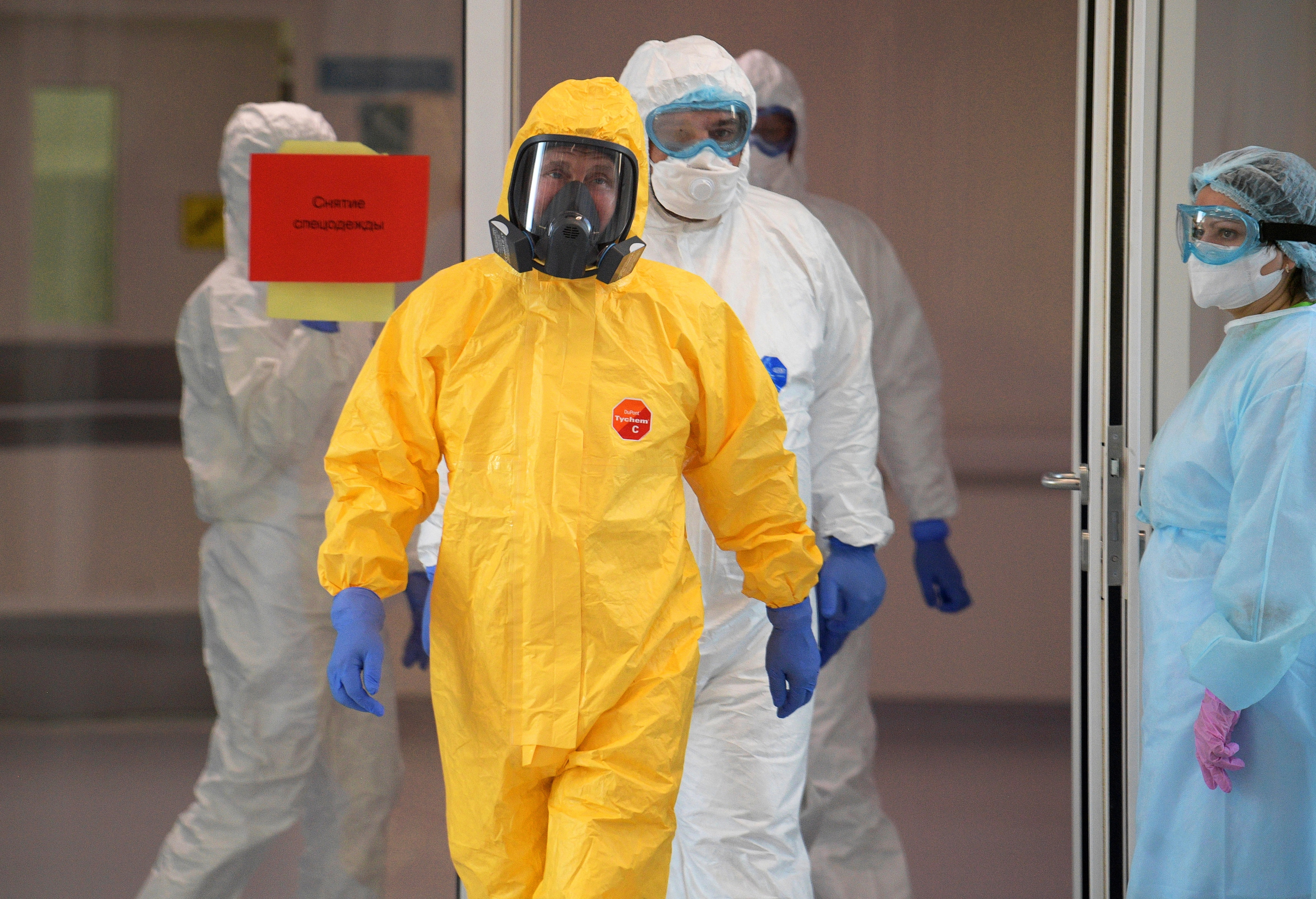
President Putin visits coronavirus patients at the City Clinical Hospital No. 40 in Moscow on 24 March.

Ongoing: COVID-19 pandemic in Russia

=== January ===
- January 22 – Russia is seen as the tenth most corrupt country in the world.
- January 30 – Russia closes its land border with the People's Republic of China to prevent the spread of COVID-19.

=== February ===
- February 20 – Russian authorities suspend the entry of Chinese citizens to Russia for employment, private, educational and tourist purposes, due to fears of the COVID-19 Outbreak.

=== March ===
- March 24 – COVID-19 pandemic: Moscow Mayor Sergey Sobyanin told President Putin at a meeting that "a serious situation is unfolding" and that the relatively low number of confirmed cases could be due to a low level of testing, saying that "there are far more people who are infected" and that the number of people in Moscow suspected of having the coronavirus was about 500. A number of venues and parks in Russia including Crocus Expo in Krasnoyarsk, Exhibition of Achievements of National Economy and Patriot Park in Moscow and Lenexpo in Saint Petersburg were turned into temporary hospitals.
- March 28 – the government decided to close all automobile, railway, pedestrian, river, or other border checkpoints, including on the Belarus border, with exceptions similar to that of the air travel restrictions.

=== April ===
- April 10 – 2020 Russia–Saudi Arabia oil price war: Russia and Saudi Arabia, when implementing the new OPEC+ agreement from May to the end of June 2020, will have to produce no more than 8.5 million barrels of oil per day.
- April 30 – Russia announced there are more than 100,000 people infected by the coronavirus; Russian Prime Minister Mikhail Mishustin said that his tests for coronavirus showed positive results, his First Deputy Andrey Belousov was appointed as Acting Prime Minister.

=== May ===
- May 1 – Vladimir Yakushev Minister of Construction Industry, Housing and Utilities Sector, was hospitalized after he was diagnosed with coronavirus. His deputy was appointed as acting minister.

=== June ===
- June 4 – Russian President Putin agreed to declare a national emergency after the 20,000 tons of diesel spill near Norilsk.

=== July ===
- July 1:
  - The 2020 Russian constitutional referendum, Due to Yes Vote, The amendments include sweeping changes to the constitution, including allowing Putin to run again for two more six-year presidential terms, constitutionally banning same-sex marriage, enshrine the status of the Russian language, placing the constitution above international law, the minimal residency requirement for presidential candidates will be raised from 10 years to 25; and may not have ever in their life held foreign citizenship or residency.

  - The railway-cargo part of the Krymsky bridge through Kerch Strait has been opened.

=== August ===
- August 20 – A Russian opposition leader Alexei Navalny felt unwell while being on a place from Tomsk to Moscow. The plane made an emergency landing in Omsk, and Navalny was taken to the hospital, where he fell into a coma. He was transported to Germany shortly after. The German government later announced that the politician was poisoned.

=== September ===
- September 13 – Local elections were held including the election of the heads of 17 Republics and the election of deputies of legislative bodies in 11 districts of the Russian Federation. In regions where governors resigned after June 13, 2020, elections were held on a single voting day in 2021. A new governor was elected in Sevastopol, Leningrad Oblast.
- September 21 – Caucasus 2020 (also called Kavkaz 2020) multinational command post exercise will start

=== October ===
- The Investigative Committee of Russia opened a criminal case due to pollution and massive death of marine animals in the Avacha Bay of Kamchatka.

=== November ===
- November 10 – President of Azerbaijan, Prime Minister of Armenia, and President of Russia signed a ceasefire agreement to stop the military conflict the Nagorno-Karabakh region.

=== December ===
- December 2 – President Vladimir Putin launched the COVID-19 vaccination campaign with the Sputnik V vaccine developed at the Gamaleya Research Institute of Epidemiology and Microbiology.
- December 18 – The press service of TNT TV channel announced the closure of the Russian longest-running reality show Dom-2.
- December 21 – Alexei Navalny's team published the politic's phone conversation with FSB officer Kudryavtsev. According to the recording, the officer admitted that Navalny was poisoned with the nerve agent Novichok. The Federal Security office called it a provocation.

== Deaths ==
=== January ===
- January 1 — Aleksandr Aleksandrovich Blagonravov, 86, Russian scientist.
- January 2 — Roman Monchenko, 55, Russian rower, Olympic bronze medallist (1996).
- January 15 —
  - Nikolai Tsymbal, 94, Russian military officer.
  - Ivan Ustinov, 100, Russian intelligence officer (NKVD, SMERSH, KGB).
- January 21 — Boris Tsirelson, Russian-Israeli mathematician (b. 1950)

=== February ===
- February 1 - Victor Afanasyev, Russian military actress (b. 1947)

=== March ===
- March 25 – Inna Makarova, Soviet and Russian actress (b. 1926)

=== July ===
- July 2 – Nikolai Kapustin, Soviet and Russian composer and pianist (b. 1937)

=== September ===
- September 4 – Khanifa Iskandarova, Russian educator (b. 1928)
- September 16 – Maxim Martsinkevich,

=== October ===
- October 2 – A Russian journalist Irina Slavina self-immolated in front of the building of the Nizhny Novgorod Oblast Police. In her last post on Facebook, she blamed the Russian Federation for her death.

=== November ===
- November 18 – Alexander Dubyanskiy

=== December ===
- December 20 – Vitaly Bakulin, Russian professional football player (b. 1983)
- December 21 – Valentina Parshina, Russian agronomist and politician (b. 1937)
