= 2013 in Russia =

- Decades: 1990s; 2000s; 2010s; 2020s
- See also: History of Russia; Timeline of Russian history; List of years in Russia

The following lists events from the year 2013 in Russia.

== Incumbents ==
- President of Russia: Vladimir Putin
- Prime Minister of Russia: Dmitry Medvedev

=== Governors ===
- Amur Oblast: Oleg Kozhemyako (ER)
- Arkhangelsk Oblast: Igor Orlov (ER)
- Astrakhan Oblast: Alexander Zhilkin (ER)
- Belgorod Oblast: Yevgeny Savchenko (ER)
- Bryansk Oblast: Nikolay Denin (ER)
- Chelyabinsk Oblast: Mikhail Yurevich (ER)
- Irkutsk Oblast: Sergey Yeroshenko (ER)
- Ivanovo Oblast: Mikhail Men (until October 16, ER), Pavel Konkov (starting October 16, ER)
- Kaliningrad Oblast: Nikolay Tsukanov (ER)
- Kaluga Oblast: Anatoly Artamonov (ER)
- Kemerovo Oblast: Aman Tuleyev (ER)
- Kirov Oblast: Nikita Belykh (Independent)
- Kostroma Oblast: Sergey Sitnikov (ER)
- Kurgan Oblast: Oleg Bogomolov (ER)
- Kursk Oblast: Aleksandr Mikhailov (ER)
- Leningrad Oblast: Alexander Drozdenko (ER)
- Lipetsk Oblast: Oleg Korolyov (ER)
- Magadan Oblast: Nikolai Dudov (until February 3, ER), Vladimir Pechnyony (starting February 3, ER)
- Moscow Oblast: Andrey Vorobyov (ER)
- Murmansk Oblast: Marina Kovtun (ER)
- Nizhny Novgorod Oblast: Valery Shantsev (ER)
- Novgorod Oblast: Sergey Mitin (ER)
- Novosibirsk Oblast: Vasily Yurchenko (ER)
- Omsk Oblast: Viktor Nazarov (ER)
- Orenburg Oblast: Yury Berg (ER)
- Oryol Oblast: Alexander Kozlov (ER)
- Penza Oblast: Vasily Bochkarev (ER)
- Pskov Oblast: Andrey Turchak (ER)
- Rostov Oblast: Vasily Golubev (ER)
- Ryazan Oblast: Oleg Kovalyov (ER)
- Sakhalin Oblast: Alexander Khoroshavin (ER)
- Samara Oblast: Nikolai Merkushkin (ER)
- Saratov Oblast: Valery Radaev (ER)
- Smolensk Oblast: Alexey Ostrovsky (LDPR)
- Tambov Oblast: Oleg Betin (ER)
- Tomsk Oblast: Sergey Zhvachkin (ER)
- Tula Oblast: Vladimir Gruzdev (ER)
- Tver Oblast: Andrey Shevelyov (ER)
- Tyumen Oblast: Vladimir Yakushev (ER)
- Ulyanovsk Oblast: Sergey Morozov (ER)
- Vladimir Oblast: Nikolay Vinogradov (until March 24, CPRF), Svetlana Orlova (starting March 24, ER)
- Volgograd Oblast: Sergey Bozhenov (ER)
- Vologda Oblast: Oleg Kuvshinnikov (ER)
- Voronezh Oblast: Alexey Gordeyev (ER)
- Yaroslavl Oblast: Sergey Yastrebov (ER)
- Jewish Autonomous Oblast: Alexander Vinnikov (ER)

== Events ==
=== January ===
- January 3 - Vladimir Putin, the President of Russia, grants Russian citizenship to Gérard Depardieu who has renounced his French citizenship due to high taxes.
- January 4 - Six Russian tourists are killed and two tourists are seriously injured after a snowmobile towing a sled veers off a ski slope, crashes into a barrier, and flies into a ditch on Italy's Mount Cermis.
- January 15 - Russia launches three Kosmos series military-purpose satellites using Rokot launch vehicle.
- January 16 - Russian mafia boss Aslan Usoyan is killed in Moscow.
- January 17 - Russian dissident Alexandr Dolmatov commits suicide in Rotterdam.
- January 20 - At least four miners are killed and four others trapped after a fire at a mine in Prokopyevsky District, Kemerovo Oblast.
- January 22 - The Russian government organizes an evacuation from the Syrian Civil War for some of its citizens by transporting them to Lebanon and then flying them to Russia.
- January 24 - Russian police announces that 13 rebels, including Khuseyn Gakayev and his brother, are killed in fighting in the Vedensky District, Chechnya.
- January 24 - The government of Ukraine signs a major $10 billion shale gas deal with Royal Dutch Shell to reduce its dependency on Russian gas imports.
- January 25 - Scuffles occur on the streets of Moscow as supporters and opponents clash over the Russian parliament's attempts to implement anti-gay legislation. If legalised it would result in fines for those who promote events with a gay theme.
- January 31 - Volgograd passes a measure to refer to itself by its previous name, Stalingrad, on Victory Day and five key dates relating to the Battle of Stalingrad.

=== February ===
- February 11 - An underground methane gas explosion killed up to 18 miners at a coal pit in northern Russia.
- February 13 -President Vladimir Putin submits a bill that would ban Russian Cabinet members and other senior officials from having foreign bank accounts and owning foreign stock.
- February 15 - A meteor broke up in the vicinity of the city of Chelyabinsk. According to Chelyabinsk's health department, around 1,200 people were injured, two of whom seriously, from the shattering of windows caused by the shockwaves and the debris.

=== March ===
- March 28 - A bus crash in northwest Russia killed six people and injured at least 23 others, including orphans returning from a field trip.

=== April ===
- April 22 - A man went on a shooting rampage outside a firearm shop in Belgorod, killing six people.
- April 25 - The State Duma pass a bill banning government officials from holding overseas bank accounts and foreign-issued equities. The bill was backed by 443 deputies.
- April 26 - A fire in a psychiatric hospital in the settlement of Ramensky killed 38 people.

=== May ===
- May 1 - Three policemen were killed and two wounded after unknown assailants opened gun fire on their car in Buynaksk.
- May 7 -, President Putin signed a new law (“Law 79-FZ”) forbidding government officials from holding overseas bank accounts.
- May 8 - A fuel train derailed in Rostov Oblast causing a massive fire with one person missing, 44 injured and 3,000 evacuated.
- May 20 - At least four people were killed and 46 injured after two bombs exploded in the capital of Dagestan Republic, Makhachkala.

=== June ===
- June 19 - At least 43 people sought medical help and more than 6,500 residents were evacuated in southwestern Samara Oblast, after ammunition explosions shook a military training area.
- June 11 - The Russian gay propaganda law bill is unanimously approved by the State Duma (with just one MP abstaining.
- June 30 - The Russian gay propaganda law bill is signed into law by President Vladimir Putin.

=== July ===
- July 7 - Up to 80 people have been injured, after a passenger train derailed in the southern region of Krasnodar.
- July 13 – 18 people were killed and 45 injured after a gravel truck smashed into a bus near Podolsk.

=== August ===
- August 20 - police killed nine suspected militants, including a prominent warlord, in a clash in the restive North Caucasus republic of Dagestan.

=== September ===
- September 10 - An embargo was imposed on imports of Moldovan wine.
- September 13 – 37 people have died in a fire at a psychiatric hospital in Novgorod Region.

=== October ===
- October 13 - Over 380 people were detained after an anti-migrant nationalist riot in southern Moscow.
- October 21 - A suspected female suicide bomber has set off explosives on a bus in the southern city of Volgograd, killing six people and injuring 37.

=== November ===
- November 17 - A passenger plane crashes at an airport in the city of Kazan, killing all 50 people on board.

== Deaths ==
=== January ===
- January 1 – Saima Karimova, 86, Russian geologist (born 1926).
- January 2 - Yuri Alexandrov, 49, Russian boxer, heart attack.
- January 4 - Yevgeny Pepelyaev, pilot (born 1918)

=== March ===
- March 23 - Boris Berezovsky, 67, Russian business oligarch. (born 1946)

=== March ===
- September 9 - Galina Bogdanova, 88, Russian grinder and production leader (born 1925)

=== October ===
- October 3 - Sergei Belov, 69, Russian professional basketball player. (born 1944)
- October 28 - Shota Shamatava, 77, politician (born 1936)

== See also ==
- List of Russian films of 2013
