= Stupina =

Stupina may refer to several villages in Romania:

- Stupina, a village in Crucea Commune, Constanța County
- Stupina, a village in Cârlogani Commune, Olt County
- Stupina, a village in Măicănești Commune, Vrancea County

== See also ==
- Stupin
