= 2021 in Russia =

- Decades: 2000s; 2010s; 2020s
- See also: History of Russia; Timeline of Russian history; List of years in Russia

Events in the year 2021 in the Russian Federation.

== Incumbents ==
Photo	Post	Name
	President of Russia	Vladimir Putin
	Prime Minister of Russia	Mikhail Mishustin

== Events ==
Ongoing: COVID-19 pandemic in Russia

=== No date announced ===
- The construction Murmansk Commercial Sea Port is planned to be completed.
- The launch of mass production of the Russian medium-haul passenger airliner MC-21 is planned.
- Commissioning of the 2nd power unit at Leningrad Nuclear Power Plant-2 with a VVER-1200 reactor.

=== January - March ===
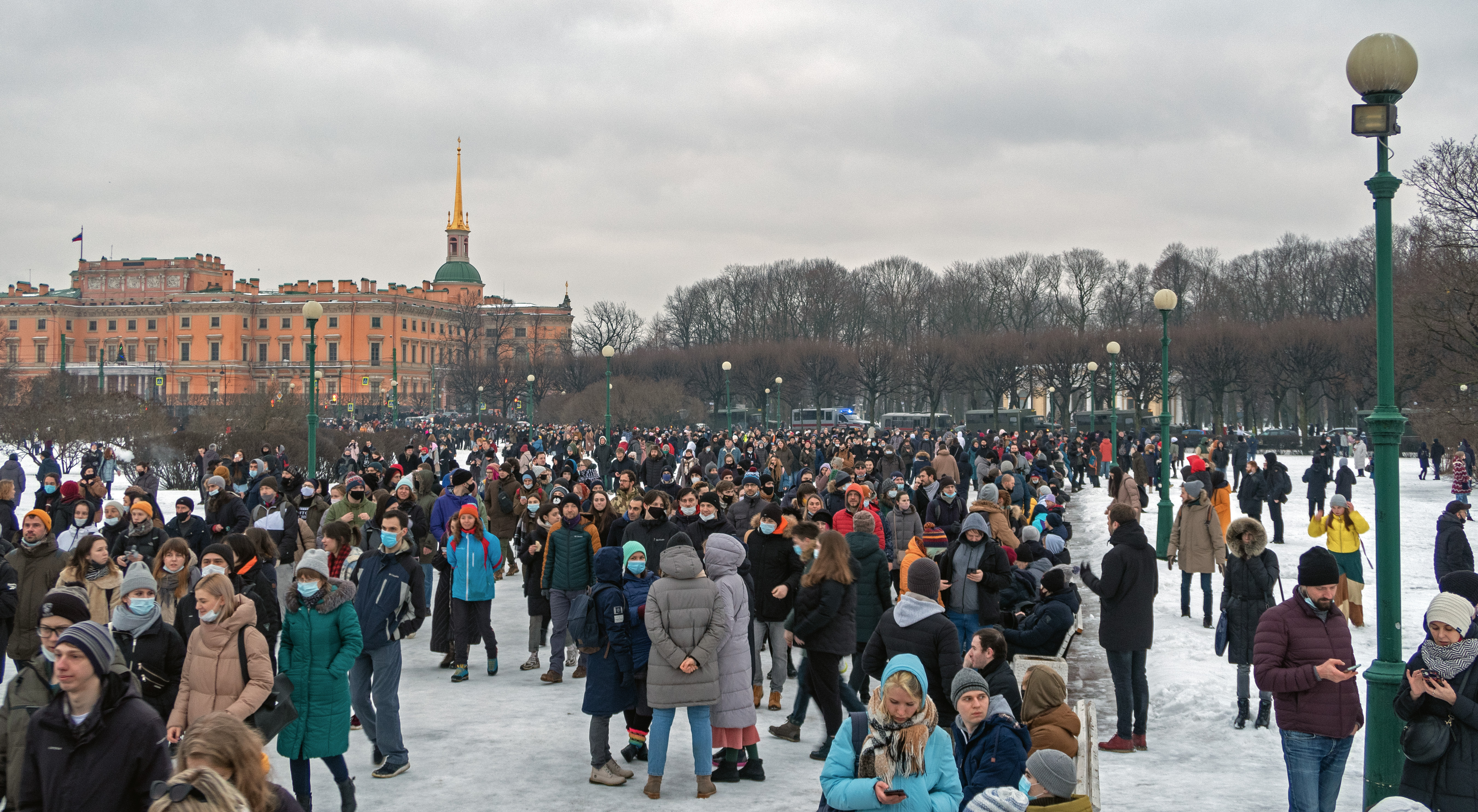
Protests in Saint Petersburg

- 9 January – Norilsk avalanche: three dead, one in serious condition, and six missing in an avalanche in Norilsk which buried houses. An event like this has never happened in Norilsk, despite avalanches being common in the region, this was the first event of such magnitude in terms of fatalities and missing persons.
- 11 January – In Moscow, four soldiers are killed after a truck crashes into the convoy of buses they are in. 40 other soldiers were reported to be injured.
- 12 January – 2021 Yekaterinburg fire: eight people die in an apartment fire in Yekaterinburg. It is reported that the victims succumbed to carbon monoxide poisoning, rather than the flames. It is reported that among the eight fatalities, there was a child The cause of the fire is under investigation, and it is thought that the fire was accidental.
- 23 January – Protests against the arrest of Alexei Navalny begin throughout Russia.
- 22 February – In ice hockey, New York Rangers winger and Kremlin critic Artemi Panarin takes a personal leave of absence after the Russian tabloid Komsomolskaya Pravda publishes a story in which former Kontinental Hockey League coach Andrei Nazarov accuses him of sexually assaulting an 18-year-old Latvian woman in Riga.

=== April - June ===
- 8 April – Secretary of Security Council of Russia Nikolai Patrushev denies reports of Russia's plans to intervene in Ukraine following reports of Russian troops amassing near the Russo-Ukrainian border.
- 11 May – Nine people are killed and 23 are injured following a mass shooting at a school in Kazan, the capital of Tatarstan .
- 29 May – Moscow Vostochny railway station is opened in Moscow and is the first new railway station to be built in the Russian capital since 1902.
- 3—6 June – XXIV St. Petersburg International Economic Forum takes place.
- 11 June — 11 July – UEFA Euro 2020. Gazprom Arena hosts some of the games.

=== July–September ===
- 6 July – An Antonov An-26 carrying 28 passengers and crews slams into a steep cliff while on approach to Palana. All 28 people on board are killed in the crash, including Olga Mokhireva, the mayor of Palana.
- 6—8 July – At least eight people are killed by floods caused by heavy rains in Krasnodar Krai.
- 16 July – An Antonov An-28 operating as SiLA Airlines Flight 42 crash lands into a swamp in Tomsk Oblast following an engine failure mid-flight. Two injuries are reported in the incident.
- 2 August – A tornado kills three people in Andreapol (Tver Oblast).
- 12 August
  - A helicopter carrying 16 people, most of whom are tourists, crashes into a lake in Kamchatka. At least eight are rescued and eight others are feared dead.
  - Russian authorities detains the head of Hypersonic System Research Institute Alexander Kuranov for suspected treason.
  - Voronezh bus explosion: Two people die and 24 are injured after a PAZ-4234 explodes in Voronezh. The causes are unknown.
- 12 September – A Let-410 operating as Siberian Light Aviation Flight 51 crashes in Irkutsk Oblast. 4 people are killed.
- 20 September – Six people are killed and 47 others injured in a mass shooting at Perm State University in Perm, Russia.
- 26 September – The 2021 Russian Grand Prix was held in the Sochi Autodrom. Lewis Hamilton achieved first place, ahead of Max Verstappen and Carlos Sainz.

=== October to December ===
- 10 October – 2021 Menzelinsk parachute Let L-410UVP-E crash. 16 of the 22 people on board were killed.
- 15 October–14 November – 2021 Russian Census
- 25 November – 51 people killed in the Listvyazhnaya mine disaster.
- 7 December – Gunman opens fire in Moscow services center, kills 2 people and injures 4.
- 13 December - Russia's domestic intelligence service said it had arrested 106 supporters of what it called a Ukrainian neo-Nazi youth group planning attacks and mass murders. The Federal Security Service (FSB) said the "Maniacs Cult of Murder" group had been set up by a Ukrainian under the patronage of Ukraine's intelligence services. The FSB, in its statement, said it had made detentions in 37 of Russia's more than 80 regions and that two of the detainees had planned to attack educational institutions.

== Deaths ==
=== January ===
- 14 January – Boris Grachevsky, film director (b. 1949)
- 28 January – Vasily Lanovoy, actor (b. 1934)

=== February ===
- 13 February – Yury Vlasov, weightlifter (b. 1935)
- 18 February – Andrey Myagkov, actor (b. 1938)

=== March ===
- 1 March – Mikhail Studenetsky, 86, Russian basketball player, Olympic silver medallist (1956), COVID-19.
- 3 March –
  - Andrei Polyakov, 70, Russian diplomat, ambassador to Tunisia (2006–2011) and Rwanda (2013–2017).
  - Yuri Rozanov, 59, Russian sportscaster (NTV Plus, Match TV).

=== April ===
- 2 April – Valentin Afonin, 81, Russian footballer (SKA Rostov-on-Don, CSKA Moscow).
- 3 April – Yevgeniy Zagorulko, 78, Russian high jump coach, complications from COVID-19.
- 5 April – Vladimir Gendlin, 84, Russian television journalist and sports commentator (NTV, NTV Plus, Channel One), complications from COVID-19.

=== May ===
- 7 May – Yegor Ligachyov, Soviet politician (b. 1920)

=== June ===
- 20 June – Anatoly Lysenko, television figure, journalist and producer (b. 1937)
- 24 June – Olga Moiseeva, ballerina and teacher (d. 1928)

=== July ===
- 5 July – Vladimir Menshov, actor (b. 1939)

=== August ===
- 9 August – Sergey Kovalyov, human rights activist (b. 1930)
- 18 August – Evgeny Sveshnikov, Russian chess player and writer (b. 1950)

=== September ===
- 8 September – Yevgeny Zinichev (b. 1966) and Aleksandr Melnik (b. 1958)

=== October ===
- 12 October – Vladimir Markin, journalist (b. 1956)
- 19 October – Tamara Gudima, politician, member of State Duma (1993–2000) (b. 1936).
- 30 October – Igor Kirillov, Soviet TV anchor (b. 1932)

=== November ===
- 12 November – Yevgeniy Chazov, physician (b. 1929)
- 21 November
  - Marietta Chudakova, literary critic (b. 1937)
  - Nina Ruslanova, actress (b. 1945)
- 28 November – Alexander Gradsky, singer (b. 1949)

=== December ===
- 1 December – Nikolai Paltsev, 72, Russian politician, mayor of Stavropol (2008–2011).
- 3 December – Nina Urgant, 92, Russian actress (Tamer of Tigers, Belorussian Station, Bonus).
- 4 December – Boris Misnik, 83, Russian politician, deputy (1995–2000).
