= Stupin =

Stupin (Russian: Ступин) is a Russian male surname. Its feminine counterpart is Stupina. It may refer to:

- Alexander Stupin (1776–1861), Russian painter and art teacher
- Konstantin Stupin (1972–2017), Soviet and Russian rock musician and actor
- Paul Stupin, American film and television executive
- Rafael Stupin (1798–1861), Russian painter
- Sergei Stupin (born 1979), Russian ice hockey defenceman
- Yevgeny Stupin (born 1983), Russian opposition politician and lawyer
