= Pacific National University =

University in Khabarovsk, Russia

- Тихоокеанский государственный университет
- Established: 1958
- President: Yuriy Marfin
- Location: 136, Tikhookeanskaya Street, Khabarovsk, Khabarovsk, Russia; 48°31′51″N 135°03′10″E Building details
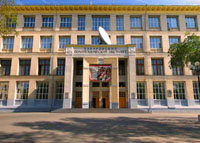
- Website: togudv.ru

The Pacific National University (PNU) is a public university in Khabarovsk, Russia, established in 1958. PNU has over 12,000 students in 80 academic majors.

Yuriy S. Marfin, the rector of the Pacific National University

== History ==
The Pacific National University (PNU) started as the Khabarovsk Automobile Highway Institute, founded by the USSR Ministry of Higher Education on March 29, 1958. M. P. Danilovsky served as president for the following 30 years. The initial enrollment was approximately 150 students. The institute offered majors in industrial, highway and civil engineering, motor transport, construction, and highway machines and equipment.

By 1962, the institute had five departments: engineering, mechanical engineering, automobile engineering, highway engineering and forest engineering. Students were trained in 10 majors, and enrollment had increased to 1150 students. On July 12, 1962, the Khabarovsk Automobile Highway Institute was renamed the Khabarovsk Poly-technical Institute. The first engineering students graduated in 1963.

In 1967, construction of the campus buildings was completed. By then, the institute trained engineering students in 18 majors. In 1975, a branch of the institute was founded in Magadan, Russia.

In December 1992, the Khabarovsk Poly-technical Institute became Khabarovsk State University of Technology. On March 23, 2005, it was renamed Pacific National University.

== Current structure ==
As of 2021, Pacific National University (PNU) had eight institutes. These are the Far East Highway Institute, the Far East Institute of Forest Industry, the Far East Law Institute, the Institute of Architecture and Civil Engineering, the Institute of Information Technologies, the Institute of Automotive and Power Engineering, the Institute of Economics and Management and the Far Eastern Institute of Branch Technologies, Management, Business and Law (Department for Extension and Parallel Training; Extra-Mural Department for Extension Training; Department for Further Professional Training). PNU also has three departments. These are the International Studies Department, the Department of Mathematical Modelling and Control Processes and the Extra-Mural Department.

In November 2009, PNU had over 21,000 students in 61 majors of basic higher professional education, 32 Bachelor's degree programs, 26 Master's degree programs, and 40 scientific majors of postgraduate education. There were 900 faculty members at PNU, including 102 full professors and over 426 associate professors.

== Research activities ==
More than 20 scientific schools have been established at Pacific National University (PNU). PNU conducts research in physical and mathematical sciences, including theoretical nuclear physics, as well as in information and telecommunication technologies, nanotechnologies, materials science, mechanical engineering, architecture and urban planning, sociology, economics and jurisprudence.

=== Applied research fields ===
The main fields of applied research are measuring, calculation and control devices; information processing systems; computer-based information systems design; development of robot systems, including underwater robotics; applied materials science; improvement of technological processes and of machine and mechanism engineering; improving the efficiency and operating characteristics of transportation; engineering of logging technologies and timber processing; sustainable use of natural resources and environmental protection; forest reserve restoration; alternative energy source generation; design of industrial and civil buildings and structures; and development of modern construction technologies and operation of transport facilities.

=== Activity ===
More than 600 scientific papers covering the results of Pacific National University research are published annually in Russian and foreign journals and in the proceedings of international conferences.

PNU has more than 20 laboratories, more than 20 scientific-educational and engineering centers, and 2 student design engineering bureaus.

The university's research teams compete for research funding under the Federal Target Programs, Scientific and Technical Programs and grants in various scientific fields, including grants and programs of the Federal Agency for Education, the Federal Agency for Science and Innovation and the Russian Foundation for Basic Research.

Research projects by PNU scientists are presented annually at international scientific and technical exhibitions, including the Moscow International Salon of Innovations and Investments, the International Exhibition & Congress "High Technologies. Innovation. Investments" (St. Petersburg) and the Moscow International Salon of Industrial Property "Archimedes" (Moscow). PNU staff and research teams receive more than 50 patents and certificates of registration of computer programs each year. Between 2000 and 2008, PNU scientists submitted 298 inventions and utility models for patenting and obtained 259 patents.

PNU has established a number of subdivisions: Innovation and Technology Center, Technology Transfer Center in Khabarovsky krai, Impulse Center, Nonprofit Partnership "Far Eastern Technology Transfer Center," and the Students' Business Incubator.

=== Doctoral and PhD Studies ===
The Pacific National University PhD degree program is conducted in 40 majors, including five majors introduced in 2007–2008. The PNU doctorate degree program is conducted in 7 majors.

PNU has 6 dissertation councils, which work in 11 majors. The university is also a co-founder of four joint dissertation councils.

Every year over 3,000 students participate in student research work (SRW) events.

== Information technology ==
Pacific National University has an information and education complex that includes:

- Local university interior network
- External distributed network
- Automated control system of the education process
- Automated control system of the university
- Electronic documentation system
- Informational - library complex

There are 2200 computers and 40 computerized classrooms at PNU, where practical training for information technology majors is conducted. More than 1,750 computers are connected to the LAN. The unified network also includes 40 servers and 110 units of network equipment.

An

Internet-based distance learning system is being developed. The university has developed a technology for the rapid creation of electronic textbooks and lecture courses in chm, DjVu and PDF formats. More than 3500 students of the Extra-Mural Department and the Extra-Mural Department for Extension Training use the data portal and the AST-3 system in their studies.

Pacific National University is involved in developing information systems for education at the regional level. The PNU communication center provides management and technical support to the telecommunication network of science and higher education institutions of Khabarovsky krai and operates the Khabarovsk Regional Educational Information Network (KREIN). The Paydeyya portal was designed at PNU to develop regional educational content and create websites for regional educational telecommunication projects.

The journal Information Science and Control Systems is published with the assistance of PNU scientists. In October 2009, the State Institute of Information Technologies and Telecommunications "Informika" prepared the analytical survey "Apply of Automated Control Systems to Institutions of Higher Professional Education activities in Russian Federation", based on research of automated control systems (ACS) in 673 Russian state and municipal institutions of higher education.

Pacific National University was one of 55 Russian institutions of higher education that received the highest scores in all examined ACS areas.

== Scientific Library ==
The PNU Scientific Library is the Regional Methodical Centre for 94 state and commercial libraries of institutions of higher education and specialized secondary educational institutions in Khabarovsky krai and Amur Oblast. The library holds about 1.6 million volumes and about 1 million documents, including electronic ones. It serves over 22,000 readers and records 700,000 visits (including to its website) each year. The overall University Network consists of 4 information centers and operates a local network in the library, which contains 113, 56 Sun computer terminals, 10 touch screen kiosks and 5 server PCs, and has Internet access.

== Publishing ==
Publishing is carried out by the Pacific National University Publishing House, which was established in 1993. It consists of three sections: editorial, computer-generated and operative printing. Its main purpose is to support the university's scientific and educational activities with publishing and printing products. Each year, the PNU Publishing House issues 10–12 monographs, 20–30 collections of scientific works, 35–45 titles of learning aids and textbooks, 120–150 titles of instructor's manuals for all types of training courses and students' self-study, 20–40 thesis abstracts and 30–40 reissues of earlier publications. The PNU Publishing House has been a member of the Publishing-Polygraphic Association of Universities of Russia since 2006.

== International cooperation ==
PNU maintains international relations with more than 120 foreign partners, including 68 universities, in 21 countries. Most agreements have been signed with countries of the Asia-Pacific region near Russia's Far East, especially the bordering countries: the People's Republic of China, Japan, the Republic of Korea and the Korean Democratic People's Republic.

Under long-term international cooperation programs, the university carries out academic and student exchanges, joint research, and innovation, technological, educational, cultural and business projects. PNU also trains international students and international Ph.D. students and sends Russian students abroad for training.

PNU has carried out, or is carrying out, the following international research and educational projects:

- Established the Russian-German Institute of Information and Computer Sciences at PNU in cooperation with Saarland University (Germany).
- Established the Laboratory high-precision measuring equipment named after Hideo Otsubo, PNU Honorary Dr. at PNU in cooperation with "Tokyo Seimitsu Co. Ltd" (Japan).

Annually PNU trains more than 400 international students. More than 1600 international students, Master's students, Ph.D. students, and interns studied at PNU between 1989 and 2009 (80 percent of them are citizens of China).
