= Oskar Kaibyshev =

Soviet and Russian metal physicist

- Born: Oskar Akramovich Kaibyshev; March 28, 1939; Moscow, Soviet Union
- Died: June 2, 2017 (aged 78); Alanya, Turkey
- Scientific career
- Institutions: Ufa State Aviation Technical University; Institute of Metals Superplasticity Problems of the Russian Academy of Sciences

Oskar Akramovich Kaibyshev (Russian: Оскар Акрамович Кайбышев; March 28, 1939 – June 2, 2017) was a Soviet and Russian metal physicist, founder and director of Institute of Metals Superplasticity Problems of the Russian Academy of Sciences (1987-2005), academician of the Academy of Sciences of the Republic of Bashkortostan and member of the Russian Academy of Natural Sciences, member of the Soviet of Nationalities of 11th Supreme Soviet convocation (1984-1989) from the Bashkir ASSR.

== Biography ==
Oskar Kaibyshev was born on March 28, 1939, in Moscow.

In 1962, Kaibyshev graduated from the National University of Science and Technology MISiS which at that time was known as Moscow Institute of Steel and Alloys. After graduating; he worked at the Ufa Engine Plant. In 1967, he defended his dissertation of Candidate of Sciences while at the same time worked at the Ufa State Aviation Technical University which he later, in 1969, became the head of the department in the university. In 1974, Kaibyshev defended his doctoral dissertation. He established and became a director of the Special Design Bureau "Tantal" from 1980 to 1986.

In 1985, he organized and became the first director of the Institute for Metals Superplasticity Problems of the Russian Academy of Sciences (from 1987 till 2005). Kaibyshev made an important contribution in organizing Bashkortostan Academy of Sciences being the first President of the Academy (1991).

Oskar Kaibyshev was involved in the research in the field of strength and plasticity of structural metallic materials. He and his colleagues made a unique contribution to the technology of shaping of aluminum, titanium and nickel alloys. They established the universality of the phenomenon of superplasticity for any industrial alloy, including intermetallic materials and ceramics, and developed a physical theory of superplasticity based on the effects of the interaction of dislocations and vacancies with grain boundaries, which allows to explain a number of experimental phenomena. Kaibyshev is the author of the discovery of USSR "The phenomenon of formation of nonequilibrium grain boundaries in polycrystals when they absorb lattice dislocations" (in co-authorship with Ruslan Valiev, 1985).

== Trial ==
In January 2005, the Office of the Federal Security Service for the Republic of Bashkortostan charged Kaibyshev with the transfer of dual-use technologies to South Korea. Since that time, he was removed from the position of director of the institute.

On August 9, 2006, the Supreme Court of the Republic of Bashkortostan found him guilty of transfer of dual-use technologies, abuse of managerial position and embezzlement and sentenced him to 6 years suspended imprisonment on probation, and for 3 months to deprivation of the right to hold managerial positions and awarded damages of 3,518,000 rubles to the Institute for Metals Superplasticity Problems. Kaibyshev thus appeared as another scientist in the list of Russian scientists convicted for espionage in the post-Soviet period.

According to Kaibyshev, during the investigation, the FSB (ex-KGB) operatives seized the bill of exchange for a sum of several tens of thousands of dollars from the safe of the institute, which they then cashed. A court case was held, as a result of which Major Arefiev was sentenced for theft and received five years of probation.

== Death ==
On June 2, 2017, while during his vacation in Alanya; Kaibyshev died due to an illness. He is buried at a Muslim cemetery in Ufa.

== Works ==
- 350 scientific works, including 5 monographs
- 150 inventions (patents)
- 1 discovery

== Awards ==
- Order of the Red Banner of Labour (1980)
- Bochvar Prize (2002) together with Oleg Fatkullin, Henry Borisovich Stroganov - for the monograph "Superplasticity in the processing of materials under pressure" and "Superplasticity and wear resistance in engineering"
