= Vitaly Bakulin =

Russian footballer (1983–2020)

Vitali Bakulin
Personal information
- Full name: Vitali Aleksandrovich Bakulin
- Date of birth: 8 September 1983
- Date of death: 20 December 2020 (aged 37)
- Height: 1.70 m (5 ft 7 in)
- Position: Midfielder

Senior career*
Years	Team	Apps	(Gls)
2001–2003	FC Lada Togliatti	21	(0)
2004–2005	FC Druzhba Maykop	38	(5)
2005	FC Energetik Uren	15	(0)
2006–2007	FC Druzhba Maykop	51	(6)
2008	FC Krasnodar	19	(2)
2009	FC Torpedo Armavir	18	(2)
- * Club domestic league appearances and goals

Vitali Aleksandrovich Bakulin (Russian: Виталий Александрович Бакулин; 8 September 1983 – 20 December 2020) was a Russian professional football player.

== Club career ==
He made his Russian Football National League debut for FC Lada Togliatti on 22 July 2002 in a game against FC Neftekhimik Nizhnekamsk. He also played in the FNL for Lada in 2003.

== Death ==
Bakulin died in December 2020.
