= Tazir Kariyev =

Russian footballer

Personal information
- Full name: Tazir Yunusovich Kariyev
- Date of birth: 12 February 1989
- Date of death: 8 July 2018 (aged 29)
- Place of death: Kropotkin, Russia
- Height: 1.78 m (5 ft 10 in)
- Positions: Forward; midfielder

Senior career*
Years	Team	Apps	(Gls)
2005	FC Rostov	0	(0)
2007–2008	FC Angusht Nazran (amateur)		
2009–2013	FC Angusht Nazran	84	(13)
2014–2016	FC Angusht Nazran	17	(2)
2016–2018	FC Lokomotiv Kropotkin		
- * Club domestic league appearances and goals

Tazir Yunusovich Kariyev (Russian: Тазир Юнусович Кариев; 12 February 1989 – 8 July 2018) was a Russian professional football player.

== Club career ==
He made his Russian Football National League debut for FC Angusht Nazran on 9 March 2014 in a game against FC Arsenal Tula. That was his only season in the FNL.

== Death ==
Kariyev was murdered by a gunshot early on 8 July 2018.
