= Evdokia Gaer =

Russian politician (1934–2019)

- Евдокия Гаер
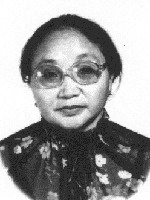
- Born: Evdokia Alexandrovna Gaer; 8 March 1934; Padali, Komsomolsky District, Far Eastern Krai, Russian SFSR, Soviet Union (now Khabarovsk Krai, Russia)
- Died: 2 October 2019 (aged 85); Moscow, Russia
- Occupations: Educator; Politician; Human rights activist
- Awards: Order of Friendship of Peoples

Evdokia Alexandrovna Gaer (Russian: Евдокия Александровна Гаер; 8 March 1934 – 2 October 2019) was a Russian educator, politician and human rights activist. She was a teacher of Russian language, literature, and history and was a research fellow at the ethnography sector of the Far Eastern Branch of the Russian Academy of Sciences in Vladivostok from 1973 to 1989. Gaer was an elected deputy of the Congress of People's Deputies of the Soviet Union and of the Supreme Soviet of the Soviet Union between 1989 and 1991. She was later elected to serve as deputy of the Federation Council of the Federal Assembly of the Russian Federation representing Primorsky Krai from 1994 to 1996. Gael's legislative career focused on indigenous rights and was a recipient of the Order of Friendship of Peoples.

== Early life ==
Gaer was born in the village of Padali, Komsomolsky District, Khabarovsk Krai on 8 March 1934. Her family were Nanai hunters, and she had an elder sister. Gaer's father, Aleksandr Andreevich, was a fisherman and hunter from the ancient Nanai clan of Gaer and originated from the village of Ommi. Her mother, Agafya (Sayla) Samar, was born in the village of Kondon. She was brought up in Padali after the family moved there before she was born until she moved to the village of Rechnoye, South Sakhalin, which became part of the Soviet Union after the victory over Japan. Gaer's maternal uncle was a poet. Gaer went to school in the place from the sixth to the ninth grade. In 1950, following the death of her mother, who drowned while fishing in the Sea of Okhotsk, she moved back to Khabarovsk Krai. Gaer enrolled at the Far Eastern State University of Humanities, graduating in 1962. She later took her postgraduate studies at the Institute of History, Archaeology and Ethnography of the Peoples of the Far East at the Far Eastern Branch of the Russian Academy of Sciences.

== Career ==
Following her graduation from the Far Eastern State University of Humanities, Gaer was assigned to work as a teacher of Russian language, literature, and history at a rural school in Ayan, Ayano-Maysky District, Khabarovsk Krai from 1962. In 1965, she became a member of the Communist Party of the Soviet Union until 1991. Between 1973 and 1989, Gaer was a research fellow at the ethnography sector of the Far Eastern Branch of the Russian Academy of Sciences in Vladivostok. She went on lengthy expeditions to various regions of the Russian Far East and defended her thesis Traditional everyday rituals of the Nanai people in the late 19th - early 20th centuries (On the problem of the sustainability and development of traditions) at the Institute of Anthropology and Ethnography in Moscow in 1984. Gaer left the institute in 1989.

In early 1989, she was selected as a candidate for election to the Congress of People's Deputies of the Soviet Union in the Nanai district by the Nanai collective farms and the Khabarovsk geological exploration company Dalgeologiya against General Viktor Novozhilov. Gaer was nominated on the belief she would win election to the legislative body and was successful. She was chair of the subcommittee on the preservation and development of small-numbered peoples of the Soviet Union and helped to establish the creation and activities of the Inter-regional Deputies Group. Gaer was also an elected member of the Supreme Soviet of the Soviet Union and of the Far Eastern Military District. She was elected as a Corresponding Member of the Russian Academy of Natural Sciences and a full member of the Far Eastern Branch of the Soviet Academy of Sciences in 1991.

Following the dissolution of the Supreme Soviet of the Soviet Union, Gaer was a deputy chairman of the State Committee of the Russian Federation for Northern Affairs from 1992 to 1994. She founded the League of Indigenous Peoples and Ethnic Groups in 1992. Between January 1994 and January 1996, Gael was an elected deputy of the Federation Council of the Federal Assembly of the Russian Federation representing the Electoral District No. 25, Vladivostok. She was a member of the member of the Federation Council Committee on Federation Affairs, the Federal Treaty and Regional Policy between February and April 1992, and from April 1992, served as deputy chairman of the Federation Council Committee on the Affairs of the North and Indigenous Peoples. Gaer was deputy chairman of the Committee for Northern and Indigenous Peoples from 1994 to 1996 and was the chief consultant and advisor to the chairman of the State Committee of the Russian Federation for Northern Development between 1997 and 1998.

Following her retirement in 1996, she continued to be actively involved in public and scientific activities and promoting idigenous peoples in lectures and scientific and socio-political reports. Gaer was an initatior of the United Nations's International Decade of the World's Indigenous People that lasted from 1995 to 2004. She established and chaired the public women's organisation Aborigenka, chaired the section on small peoples at the All-Russian public movement "Reforms - New Course" and a member of the Council of the Movement. Gaer was a professor at the Moscow International Higher Business School.

== Personal life ==
She died in Moscow on 2 October 2019 and her ashes were buried at Forest Cemetery in Vladivostok on 30 October.

== Legacy ==
In October 2014, Gaer was one of the two first citizens to be made an Honorary Citizen of Khabarovsk Krai. The Evdokia Aleksandrovna Gaer memorial in Vladivostok was named for her and unveiled in 2021. Gaer was a recipient of the Order of Friendship of Peoples.
