= Mikhail Yurevich =

Russian businessman and politician

- Михаил Юревич
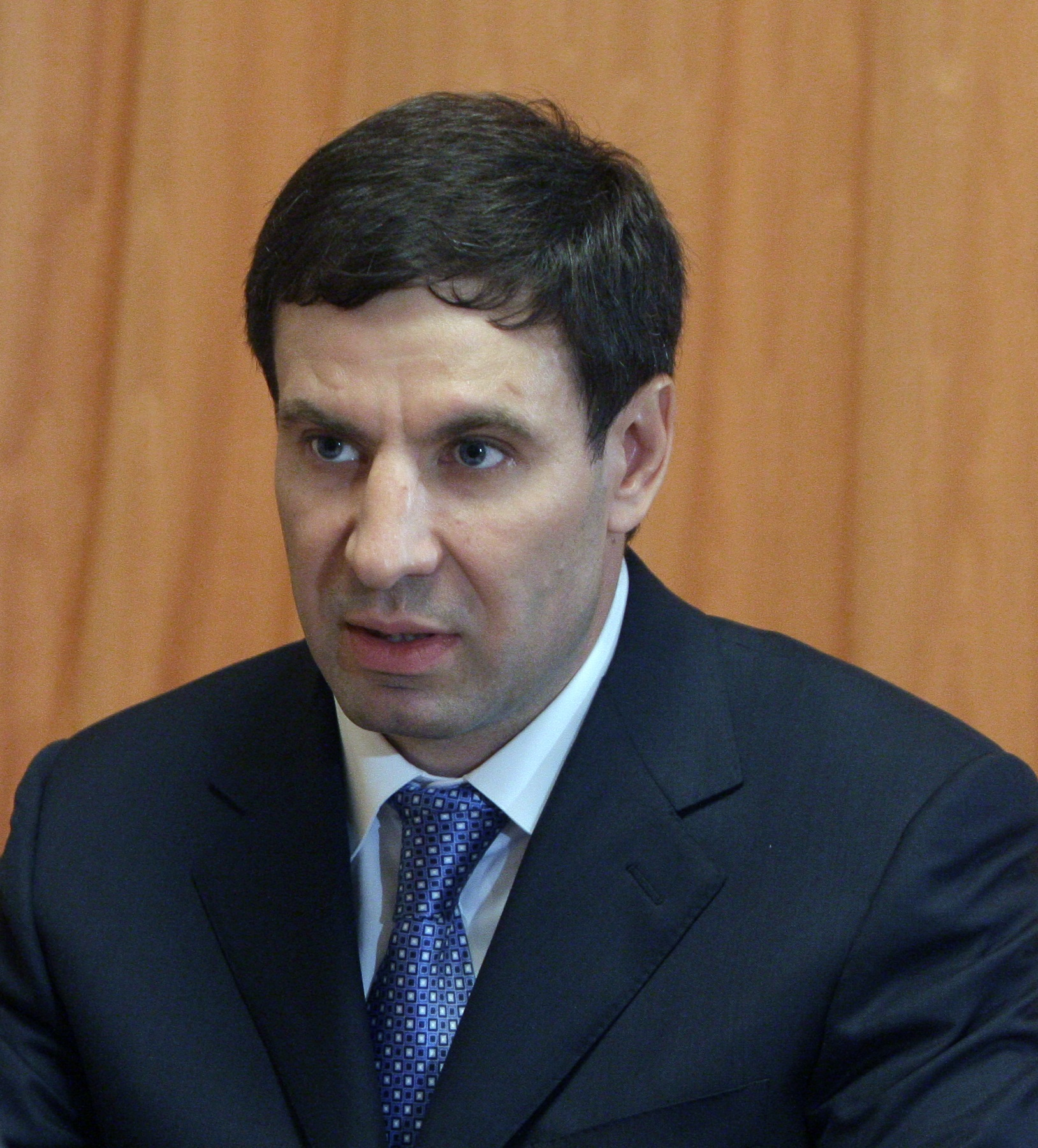
- Yurevich in 2010

Governor of Chelyabinsk Oblast
- In office 22 April 2010 – 15 January 2014
- Preceded by: Pyotr Sumin
- Succeeded by: Boris Dubrovsky

2nd Mayor of Chelyabinsk
- In office 20 March 2005 – 22 April 2010
- Preceded by: Vyacheslav Tarasov
- Succeeded by: Stanislav Mosharov

Personal details
- Born: 13 February 1969 (age 57) Chelyabinsk, RSFSR, Soviet Union

Mikhail Valeriyevich Yurevich (Russian: Михаил Валериевич Юревич; born 13 February 1969) is a Russian businessman and politician, who was the governor of Chelyabinsk Oblast between 2010 and 2014. He was also a deputy of the 3rd and 4th State Duma of the Russian Federation, mayor of Chelyabinsk (2005–2010).

== Biography ==
Mikhail Yurevich was born on February 13, 1969, in Chelyabinsk. He studied at the secondary school No. 138 of Chelyabinsk's Central district. In 1992 he graduated from Chelyabinsk State Technical University (now called South Ural State University), Faculty of Civil Engineering with a degree in civil engineering. Even as a student, he established the company Temp. In 1993, he became the Director of the Hlebokombinat № 1, carried out the reconstruction and modernization of production facilities, and organized the retail network. He created the business association Makfa.

On December 19, 1999, Yurevich was elected to the Russian State Duma of the Third Convocation. From January 26, 2000, he held the post of deputy chairman of the Committee on Energy, Transport and Communications. He was also a member of the People's Deputy Group. On December 7, 2003, he was elected to the Russian State Duma of the Fourth Convocation. That time he was a member of the Committee on Civil, Criminal, Arbitration and Procedural Legislation. During the period from 1999 till 2005 he prepared and carried out a number of significant social and charitable programs within his electoral area in the territory of Chelyabinsk. In particular, one of the most well known social project turned out to be "Makfyata' - summer leisure and employment schools for schoolchildren.

=== Chelyabinsk City Mayor (2005–2010) ===
Yurevich won the mayoral elections in Chelyabinsk on March 20, 2005, (45% of all popular votes) and became the City Mayor of Chelyabinsk. On March 1, 2009, he won again the election of Chelyabinsk City Mayor with the result of 57,53% popular votes.

=== Chelyabinsk region Governor (2010–2014) ===
On March 15, 2010, Yurevich was introduced to the region Legislative Assembly as a candidate for the post of Chelyabinsk region Governor. As a Governor he began his activity with a statement about the necessity to attract the investments to the region, announced that any impediment to business, including ones created by officials or law enforcement agencies, are considered as inadmissible. In 2010, Chelyabinsk region was assigned a long-term credit rating "BB +" on the international scale and "ruAA+" according to the national scale rating, forecast status is "Stable". In 2011, the credit rating was affirmed.

One of Yurevich's main policy aims was the development of the airport in Chelyabinsk and the expansion of international destinations. In October 2011, direct scheduled flights to Vienna, Dubai and Harbin were added. In 2012, a new international departure hall was opened at the airport of Chelyabinsk.

On January 15, 2014, the Russian President Vladimir Putin accepted Yurevich's resignation.

Throughout his career as mayor of Chelyabinsk and governor of Chelyabinsk's region, Mikhail Yurevich had consistently high approval ratings among voters. According to the “Znak.com” website, Yurevich's rating in the Chelyabinsk region was 68.2% in January 2013.

=== Further career ===
Mikhail Yurevich participated in the primaries of the “United Russia” political party in the run-up to the State Duma elections in 2016. On May 19, 2016, he announced the withdraw of his candidacy due to the "clash with a strong administrative resource."

In 2016, he was nominated for the State Duma of the Seventh Convocation elections as a self-nominated candidate. He wasn't admitted to the participation in the electoral campaign by the Central Electoral Commission of the Russian Federation (CEC of RF). In 2017, Yurevich won the case of his exclusion from elections in the Constitutional Court, the decision of the CEC was deemed illegal. According to the court decision, he had the right to demand financial compensation for the damage caused to him.

In March 2017, the Investigative Committee of the Russian Federation initiated a criminal case on bribery in relation to Mikhail Yurevich but his guilt has not been proven.

== Honours ==
In 2002, by the Decree of the President of Russia, Mikhail Yurevich was awarded a second-class Medal of the Order "For Merit to the Motherland" for his contribution to the strengthening of law, active lawmaking and conscientious work.

== Family ==
Mikhail Yurevich is married. He has three children – a son and two daughters.
