= Alexander Dubyanskiy =

Russian Tamil scholar, professor, and linguist (1941–2020)

Alexander Dubiansky
- Алекса́ндр Миха́йлович Дубя́нский
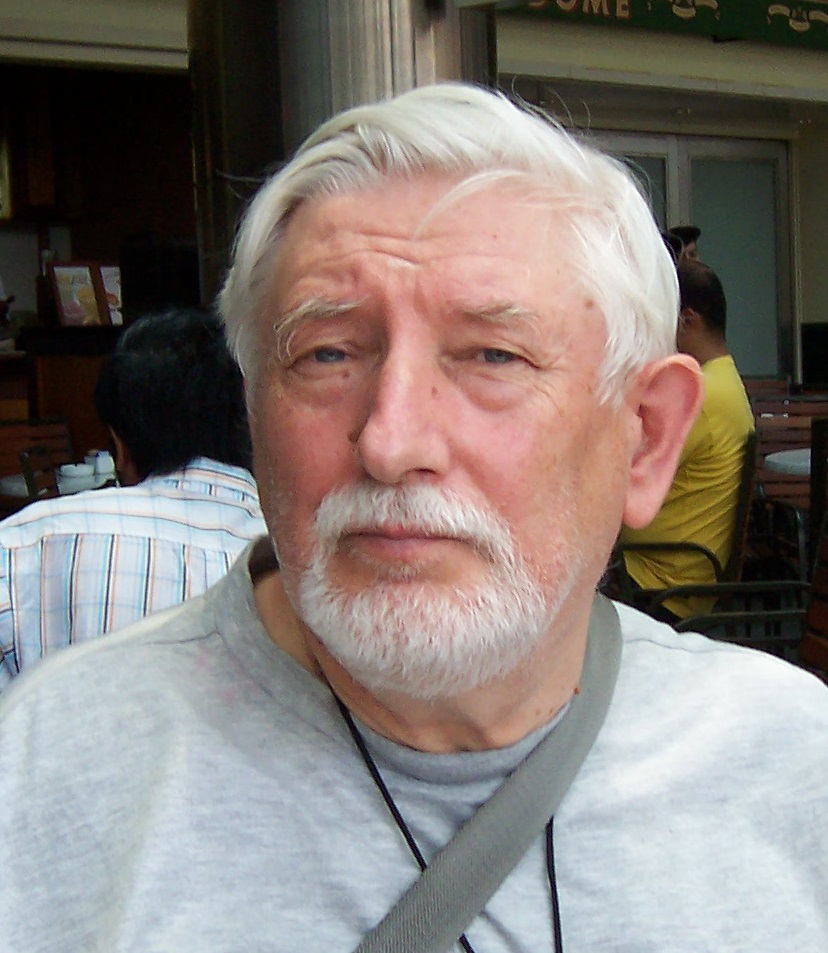
- Dubyanskiy in 2008
- Born: 27 April 1941; Moscow, Russian SFSR, Soviet Union
- Died: 18 November 2020 (aged 79); Moscow, Moscow Oblast, Russia
- Education: Institute of Asian and African Countries; Moscow State University; University of Madras
- Occupations: Scholar, writer
- Known for: Reviving Tamil language scholarship in Russia after the Soviet era
- Notable work: Ritual and Mythological Sources of the Early Tamil Poetry

Alexander Mikhailovitch Dubiansky, also spelt Alexander Dubianskiy, Alexander Dubyanskiy, or Aleksandr Dubiansky (Russian: Алекса́ндр Миха́йлович Дубя́нский, Tamil: அலெக்சாண்டர் மிகைலொவிச் துபியான்சுகி, 27 April 1941 – 18 November 2020), was a Russian Tamil scholar, university professor, linguist, and writer. During his lifetime, he was accredited and acknowledged for his valuable contributions towards the revival of Tamil language scholarship in Russia, especially after the downfall of Soviet Union.

== Career ==
Alexander Dubyanskiy was born in Moscow in 1941 and served in the Soviet Army. He afterwards attended Moscow State University's Institute of Oriental Languages, specialising in Tamil. After completing his degree, Dubyanskiy remained with the institute as a post-graduate student. He became a lecturer in 1973, later progressed to senior lecturer and then associate professor. His PhD thesis was on ancient Tamil poetry; he developed it into a book published in English.

Dubyanskiy went to India for the first time in 1978 and carried out research into the Tamil language at the University of Madras for a period of nine months. He continued his interest in learning Tamil in the post-Soviet era. Dubyanskiy was fluent in the language, and also an expert in Tamil literature and Indian culture. He taught the Tamil language for nearly 50 years at various universities in Russia.

Dubyanskiy published more than 100 works, largely on the Tamil language. He also notably published a book titled Ritual and Mythological Sources of the Early Tamil Poetry in 2000, discussing rituals and customs of ancient Sangam literature. Dubyanskiy befriended fellow Tamil scholars and writers, including D. Jayakanthan, Sivathampi and Vairamuthu.

Dubyanskiy received widespread media attention in India after presenting two papers consisting of essays on two popular historical Tamil novels (Tolkappiyam and Silapathikaram) during the 2010 World Classical Tamil Conference in Coimbatore. During the conference, he spoke against claims that Tolkappiyam was dependent on Sanskrit sources, and explained how his research showed it to be an original work.

== Death ==
Dubyanskiy died from COVID-19 complications in Moscow on 18 November 2020, at the age of 79.
