= Nikolay Neprimerov =

Russian physicist

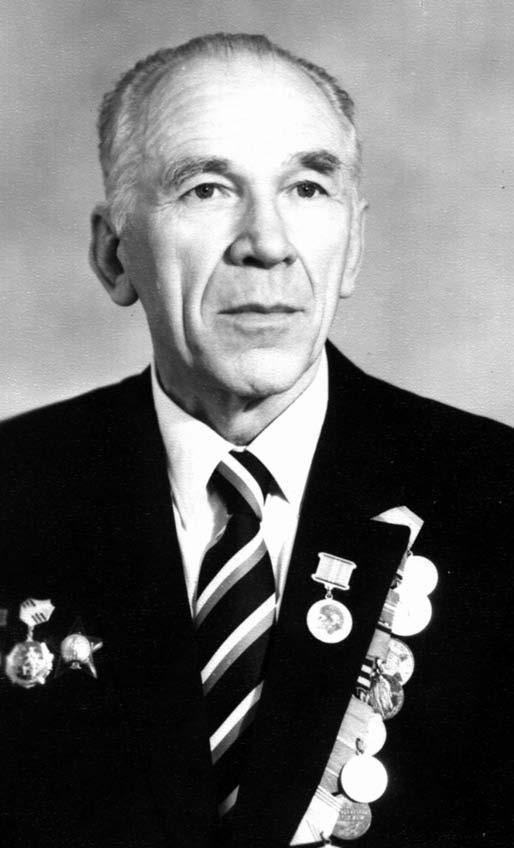
- Born: 1 May 1921; Voronezh Region, Russia
- Died: 11 January 2017 (aged 95); Kazan, Russia
- Scientific career
- Fields: physics
- Workplaces: Kazan State University

Nikolay Neprimerov (1 May 1921 – 11 January 2017) was a Doctor of Technical Sciences and professor of physics at the Kazan State University. Neprimerov was Head of the Department of Radioelectronics of the Kazan University for 32 years and is author of more than 150 scientific papers and 9 monographs. He also authored a book about the everyday life of military pilots during World War II. He was awarded numerous honours and medals, among them the Russian Federation Government Prize in Science and Technology. Neprimerov dedicated more than 40 years to and is internationally known for physical research in oil recovery.

== Biography ==
Nikolay N. Neprimerov (Preobrazhensky) was born on 1 May 1921 in the village of Annovka (Voronezh Region, Russia) to a forest ranger and a schoolteacher. In 1926, his family moved to Kazan. After graduating from School No. 83 with honours in 1939, N. Neprimerov was called up for military service. He was an aircraft technician until 1946, having served four years on the front line. Awarded the Order of the Red Star and medals.

In 1946, he became a student at the Faculty of Physics and Mathematics of the Kazan State University to remain there for all his life. He received individual scholarship and graduated from the university in 1951 with honours, continued his studies as a postgraduate under Associate Professor S.A. Altschuler, defended his PhD thesis (1954) and became Doctor of Technical Sciences (1963). During his postgraduate studies, he created a new specialisation – magnetic radiospectroscopy – and participated in the creation of a laboratory for basic research in this field. In 1960, he became Head of the Department of Radioelectronics at the Faculty of Physics and created another specialisation, Radiophysical Measurements.

In those years, he developed his own approach to scientific research. When writing his PhD thesis, Neprimerov successively designed three different test installations. He studied microwave polarisation plane rotation and magnetic susceptibility dispersion and determined the dielectric constant for all 36 analysed substances allowing to link, not only qualitatively but also quantitatively, the Macaluso-Corbino effect to electron paramagnetic resonance and to provide a theoretical rationale for this relation.

In 1955, Neprimerov became the first in the history of the Kazan State University to be awarded a contract with the Tatneft Petroleum Company.

Then, Neprimerov started integrated, in-depth studies of transfer processes in porous media, phase transitions in oil and thermal, hydrodynamic and physicochemical development of oil and gas fields. He analysed thermal and mineral water fields and the Earth's thermal regime for a deeper understanding of the processes in the Earth's interior. By the early 1980s, the data acquired from more than 250 fields employing unique instruments and basic research allowed Neprimerov to create a new technology for the optimal development of oil reservoirs based on an in-depth understanding of fluid displacement in deformed porous media. This technology – increasing production rates and oil recovery while significantly reducing production costs – was the basis for additional development projects designed for the Aznakaevskaya, East Leninogorskaya, Shugurovskaya and Berezovskaya areas of the Romashkino oil field of Tatarstan (Russia).

In 1978, Neprimerov created a new faculty at the Kazan State University for retraining oil personnel. More than 200 specialists from all over Russia graduated from this faculty over 10 years.

In 1988, the Laboratory of Physical Dynamics of Heterogeneous Media was created at the Department of Radioelectronics, and Neprimerov became its Chief Researcher after retiring from the position of Head of Department in 1992. Nikolay Neprimerov is a three-time winner of KSU's First Prize for the best research work (1957, 1962 and 1993).

Along with active research, Neprimerov worked to improve the theory and practice of teaching. About 650 students graduated from the Department of Radioelectronics in the specialisation created by Nikolay Neprimerov. He also gave public scientific lectures on Sundays at the Kazan University attracting huge audiences.

During his long life, Nikolay Neprimerov was a member of numerous scientific and technical councils, committees and ministries as well as the USSR Academy of Sciences. He was also a state examiner for the USSR State Planning Committee and a member of academic councils at the Faculties of Physics and Geology of the Kazan State University and at the Kazan Technical University. By his 70th birthday, Nikolay Neprimerov published his most important work, The Universe. Another fundamental work, Physical Dynamics, was prepared for publishing when he was 75. Nikolay Neprimerov also authored a book, Technicians, about the everyday life of military air service personnel during World War II.

Neprimerov was married to Galina Anatolievna Neprimerova since 1959.

Neprimerov died on 11 January 2017, aged 95.

== Scientific works ==
=== Man of science ===
Nikolay N. Neprimerov started his scientific life more than 60 years ago, in 1946, at the Kazan University. He graduated from the university in 1951, received a PhD degree in 1954 and became Doctor of Technical Sciences in 1963.

Nikolay Neprimerov a scientist who revived the science and technology in Russia after the Second World War.

Neprimerov spent over six decades conducting research and teaching at Kazan State University, focusing on linking basic scientific research with industrial applications.

His expeditions covered areas from Kaliningrad to Kamchatka and from Archangelsk to the Kara-Kum desert. More than 250 fields and several tens of thousands of test points were studied with instrumentation. By the early 1980s, basic research into the movement mechanism allowed Neprimerov to create a fundamentally new technology for the optimal development of oil reservoirs based on an in-depth understanding of fluid displacement in deformed porous media. In the 21st century, this field-tested technology will enable the recovery of the remaining but currently unrecoverable half of oil reserves.

Scientific publications by Nikolay Neprimerov reflect the wide spectrum of his interests. Their list includes works in the fields of magnetic and dielectric radiospectroscopy (25), radioelectronics (13), Earth physics (50), biology (6), oil field development (54), gas field development (16) and pedagogy (15). This list also contains 16 journalistic works and an autobiographic book, Technicians, about the everyday life of military air service personnel during World War II. The geography of Neprimerov's visits to research centres includes numerous countries of both hemispheres.

Nikolay Neprimerov considers physics to be more than a combination of its subdisciplines. Thanks to this approach, his contribution to science is multifaceted and diverse. His contribution includes the followings.

1. The Programme of Social Inheritance as a knowledge framework to be passed on to new generations, described in the books The Universe (1992) and Natural Science (2000).

2. A physical model of the discrete medium based on five particle properties: mass, size, charge and mechanical and magnetic moments. This list can also be complemented with the law of the alternation of interactions presented in the book Physical Dynamics (1997).

Neprimerov was an innovator. His ideas are not necessarily recognized and accepted by official science, although these provided original solutions to scientific and industrial problems.

Along with research and outreach activities, Neprimerov worked to improve the theory and practice of teaching. About 650 students graduated from the Department of Radioelectronics in the specialisation created by Nikolay Neprimerov. He also gave public scientific lectures on Sundays at the Kazan University attracting huge audiences.

Neprimerov created a multifaceted, informal scientific school working in various research and industry-related domains. His inter-faculty scientific workshops attracted scientists from all departments of the Kazan University and numerous institutions of Russia and other countries.

=== Fundamental science ===
Neprimerov's research in various sciences – physics, gravitation theory, geology, biology, etc. – suggested that these had common basics. The search for these fundamentals lead Neprimerov, in the early 1980s, to the creation of a physical model of the discrete medium consisting of particles with mass, size, charge and mechanical and magneticmoments that interact through strong forces in the microcosm and through electric and magnetic forces in the three-dimensional macrocosm.

Neprimerov analysed structural features and properties of atomic and molecular media and interaction mechanisms to present the general structure of the universe as a hierarchy of systems with size jumps and the appearance of new qualities in the transition from lower to higher systems. In 1992, Neprimerov's work of many years was published as a monograph, The Universe, and then refined in the book Physical Dynamics (1997) describing the discrete medium and the movement of energy, impulse and particles with rest mass. In addition, two more monographs were published around the start of the 21st century: Natural Science and The Structure of the Universe (2001).

These books cover the basics of a wide range of university sciences, such as microdynamics, electrodynamics, acoustic dynamics, thermodynamics, chemodynamics, fluid dynamics, geodynamics and homodynamics defined by Nikolay Neprimerov as a human science about the place of man in the Universe.

=== Vision ===
Neprimerov was deeply convinced that the scientific paradigm of the 21st century will be represented by a systematic approach, invariants and the discrete model of the environment. Based on his five-decade career, Neprimerov believes that this century will be the century of matter and that the development of science will be governed by the following 3 factors:

1. Replacement of the conventional continuum model with the discrete model mainly based on the particle size, particle interaction mechanism and the characteristic time of this interaction.

2. The systematic approach to the structure of the Universe with regard to the hierarchical jump of the particle size during the transition from one system to another and the appearance of a new quality.

3. Invariants, which are detected not only through the laws that govern events, processes and phenomena but also through the wider generalisation of laws covering various disciplines.

Neprimerov assumes that several such invariants can possibly exist:

1) The systematic hierarchical principle of the evolution of matter in time.

2) The universal law of mass transfer under a particle concentration gradient and an associated pulse of perturbation transport and energy dissipation.

3) A ratio, which quantitatively determines the new quality in the transformation of systems.

For the 21st century, Neprimerov predicts the rough determination of biological interaction mechanisms and the circuits of generation and circulation of thoughts in the neural network of the brain cortex.
