= Ksenya Ponomaryova =

Russian journalist and media manager (1961-2016)

- Kсения Пономарёва
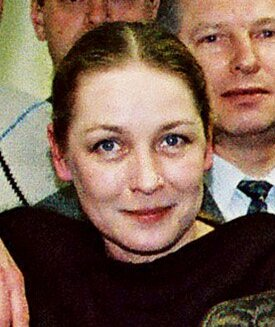
- Ponomaryova in 2000
- Born: Ksenya Yurevna Ponomaryova; 19 September 1961; Moscow, Russian SFSR
- Died: 16 August 2016 (aged 54); Moscow, Russia
- Education: MSU Faculty of History
- Occupations: Editor; Media manager
- Years active: 1984–2016
- Children: 2

Ksenya Yurevna Ponomaryova (Russian: Ксения Юрьевна Пономарёва; 19 September 1961 – 16 August 2016) was a Russian journalist, editor and media manager. She was a teacher of foreign languages until 1989 when she was appointed editor-in-chief of the daily Kommersant newspaper. Ponomaryova was later the general director of the consulting and image-making firm JSC Scheme 5 and was editor of the financial and economic weekly magazine Revizor. From 1995 to 1998, she worked at Public Russian Television (ORT) as its deputy director of information and socio-political broadcasting, general producer of its information programs and finally its general director. Ponomaryova was deputy head of the election campaign headquarters of Vladimir Putin in 2000 and was head of the election campaign of presidential candidate Ivan Rybkin in 2004.

== Biography ==
Ponomaryova was born on 19 September 1961 in Moscow to a family of scientists. She graduated from the MSU Faculty of History in 1984. Following graduation, Ponomaryova worked at the Moscow School No. 633 as a teacher of the Russian language and literature between 1984 and 1986. She later taught Polish and Slovak at the Diplomatic Academy of the USSR Ministry of Foreign Affairs from 1986 to 1988. Starting in 1988, Ponomaryova he worked at the cooperative information agency Fact (today the Kommersant Publishing House.

She ended her career as a teacher in 1989. In the same year, Ponomaryova was appointed deputy editor-in-chief at the Kommersant Publishing House and later editor-in-chief of the daily Kommersant newspaper, when its first issue was published in January 1990. She left Kommersant Publishing House in 1992. Ponomaryova was the general director of the consulting and image-making firm JSC "Scheme 5" from 1992 to 1995. In 1993, she helped to establish the financial and economic weekly magazine Revizor and became its editor-in-chief.

In October 1995, she moved to Public Russian Television (ORT) and was appointed its first deputy director of information and socio-political broadcasting, having responsibility for the broadcaster's money. Ponomaryova later became General Producer of Public Russian Television's information programs and was made a member of the company’s Board of Directors in April 1996. From 1995 to 1996, she was the head of the Vremya news programme. In October 1997, at the recommendation of the Russian president Boris Yeltsin, she was appointed to the role of acting general director of ZAO ORT. Ponomaryova became full general director two months later. She left the broadcaster in October 1998 after writing her letter of resignation the month before.

Ponomaryova got involved in the Russian political scene in 2000. That year, she was the deputy head of the election campaign headquarters of Vladimir Putin. In 2004, Ponomaryova was the head of the election campaign of presidential candidate Ivan Rybkin. During the campaign, she sent a statement to the Central Election Commission asking for Putin's re-election website to be shut down. Ponomaryova was a member of the board of directors of the newspaper Stolichnaya Vechernyaya Gazeta.

== Personal life ==
She was married and had two children. Ponomaryova died of throat cancer in Moscow on 16 August 2016 and her funeral took place the following afternoon at Nikolo-Arkhangelskoe Cemetery.
