= Konstantin Stupin =

Russian rock-musician, composer and actor (1972–2017)

- Константин Ступин
- Born: June 9, 1972; Volgograd, Soviet Union
- Died: March 17, 2017 (aged 44); Oryol, Russia
- Occupations: Singer; musician; songwriter; actor
- Musical career
- Genres: Hard rock; punk rock; bard song; blues rock; rock and roll
- Instruments: Vocals; Guitar; Bass Guitar
- Formerly of: Ночная Трость (Night Cane); Монолог (Monologue); Гранитный цех (Granite workshop)
- Website: konstantin-stupin.ru

Konstantin Stupin (Russian: Константин Валентинович Ступин; (9 June 1972 - 16 March 2017)) was a Soviet and Russian rock musician, singer, songwriter, actor, and frontman of the band Night Cane (Ночная Трость).

== Biography ==
=== Early life ===
Stupin was born on June 9, 1972, in Volgograd. When he was 1 year old, his family moved to Oryol, where he lived for the rest of his life. During his time in school, Stupin exhibited occasional disruptive behavior, such as skipping classes. Despite these challenges, his musical aptitude was recognized by a music teacher who observed his strong singing voice. As a result, Stupin was encouraged to participate in the school orchestra.

Fascinated by music, Stupin embarked on the creation of his own band. Alongside his friends, he co-founded Night Cane, deriving the band's name from a foreign film in which male genitalia were referred to as "night cane."

=== Music career ===
In 1990, Night Cane was accepted into the Moscow Rock Laboratory and performed at the "Festival of Hopes" organized by it. The band received the audience choice award. But the success was short-lived - after some time Night Cane broke up. Stupin encountered problems related to alcohol and drug use and was imprisoned several times for drug possession and theft. Coming out of prison, he tried to assemble a band. After serving another prison sentence, in 2013, Stupin tried for the last time to revive the Night Cane, after which he began a solo career.

In 2014, Stupin gained prominence in Russia after the release of an amateur music video, which garnered significant attention on YouTube, amassing approximately 9 million views.

Following his rise to prominence, Stupin began recording albums and performing concerts - both solo and in collaboration with other musicians. He wrote more than 200 songs, the most popular of which are The Fox's Fluffy Tail (Пушистый хвост лисицы), When I Died (Когда я умер), and Ice and Wind (Лёд и ветер). Stupin's last concert took place on March 12, 2017 in Moscow. On March 23, 2017, his posthumous album STUPA 2.0 was released on Apple Music.

=== Film appearances ===
Stupin played one of the roles and acted as the author of the soundtrack in Homunculus, a 2015 arthouse film directed by Roman Dmitriev and Kirill Savelyev. A fragment of the film published long before the premiere, became a meme on YouTube and received 4 million views.

In 2019, the film Stupa was released about the life of Stupin. The director of the film, Kirill Nenashev, expressed admiration for Stupin's persona and artistic contributions, prompting him to produce a documentary focused on Stupin's life and work.

"The feeling that this is a phenomenon in front of you only intensified during filming. When you watch Stupa’s recordings on YouTube, he surprises you with his, to put it mildly, unusual appearance and unique presentation, but in life, you understand that he is still a very sincere, cheerful, and bright person."

— Kirill Nenashev

== Death ==
Konstantin Stupin died on the night of March 17, 2017, at his home in Oryol. The musician had an open case of tuberculosis, but his relatives said that the cause of death was another disease. The media reported that Stupin suffered from many serious illnesses resulting from drug and alcohol use. He was buried on March 19 at the Lepyoshkinskoye cemetery in Oryol.

== Popular culture ==
In memory of Stupin, the developers of the video game Ash of Gods: Redemption created a character named Ruor, whose appearance is based on Stupin's.

== Selected works ==
=== Studio albums ===
| Year | Album | Original title | Artist |
|---|---|---|---|
| 1990 | My music is booming | Гремит моя музыка | Night Cane |
| 1990 | New order | Новый порядок | Night Cane |
| 1996 | Machines | Машины | Night Cane |
| 2013 | Fantastic | Фантастика | Night Cane |
| 2014 | Expedition | Экспедиция | Night Cane |
| 2014 | Club “Bullet of Silver” | Клуб "Пуля Серебра" | Konstantin Stupin |
| 2017 | STUPA 2.0 | STUPA 2.0 | Konstantin Stupin & Alexey Rakitin |

=== Singles ===
| Year | Single | Original title | Artist |
|---|---|---|---|
| 2013 | Ice and Wind | Лёд и ветер | Night Cane |
| 2014 | Irina and Marina | Ирина и Марина | Konstantin Stupin |
| 2015 | Our life | Наша жизнь | Konstantin Stupin |
| 2015 | Corsairs | Корсары | Konstantin Stupin |
| 2015 | My friend | Мой друг | Konstantin Stupin |
| 2016 | Autumn | Осень | Konstantin Stupin & Alexey Rakitin |
| 2016 | And I decided | И я решил | Konstantin Stupin UND Granite Workshop |
