= Alexander Levintal =

Russian politician

- Александр Левинталь
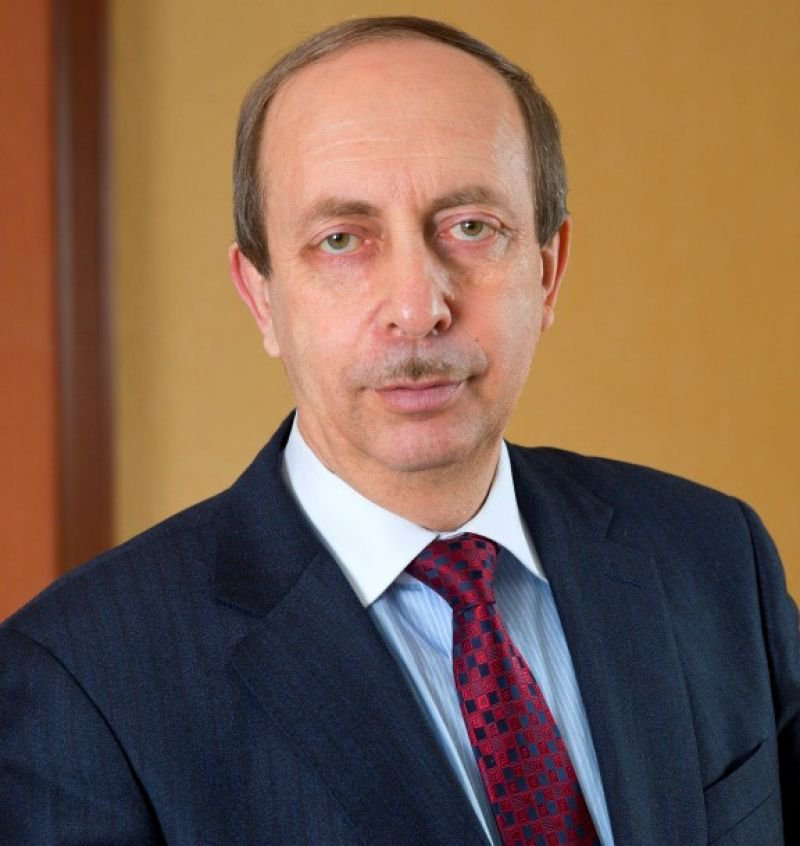
- Levintal in 2015

Governor of the Jewish Autonomous Oblast
- In office 22 February 2015 – 12 December 2019; Acting: 22 February – 22 September 2015
- Preceded by: Alexander Vinnikov
- Succeeded by: Rostislav Goldshteyn

Personal details
- Born: 18 October 1957 (age 68) Birobidzhan, Jewish Autonomous Province, Russian SFSR, Soviet Union
- Party: United Russia
- Education: Pacific National University
- Occupation: Professor; politician; economist
- Profession: Doctor in Economics

Alexander Borisovich Levintal (Russian: Александр Борисович Левинталь; born 18 October 1957) is a Russian politician. He served as the governor of the Jewish Autonomous Oblast from 2015 to 2019.

== Biography ==
He graduated from the Pacific National University in Khabarovsk, in the Russian Far East on Economics and Organization of Engineering Industry.

From 1979 to 1990, he was a researcher of the Institute of Economic Research of the Far Eastern Branch of the Soviet Academy of Sciences with seat in Khabarovsk.

From 1990 to 1992, he worked within the General Direction of Economy of the Territory of Khabarovsk.

In 1992 and 1993, Levintal was First Vice President of the Economic Committee. After 1993 he was President of the Economic Committee and Vice Governor of the Territory of Khabarovsk.

After 2000, Levintal was President of the Committee on Economics and First Deputy Minister of Economy of the region.

From 2002 to 2009, Levintal was Vice Governor of Khabarovsk and Minister of Economic Development and External Relations of Khabarovsk. In 2009, Levintal became Deputy Plenipotentiary Envoy of the President of the Russian Federation in the Far Eastern Federal District.

From October 2013 to February 2015, he was the first deputy chairman of the Khabarovsk Territory Government on economic issues.

On 24 February 2015, Levintal was appointed by Presidential Decree as Acting Governor of the Jewish Autonomous Region. He was confirmed in the post by election in September 2015 and served until his resignation in December 2019.

Levintal is Doctor in Economics and Professor. He has the title of "Honored Economist of the Russian Federation", having been awarded with the Order of Friendship, and having received the medals: "For Merit in the All-Russia Population Census", "For Strengthening the Combat Commonwealth", the EMERCOM of Russia "Marshal Vasily Chuikov".

He is married and has a daughter.
