= Boris Dubrovsky (politician) =

Russian politician

- Борис Дубровский
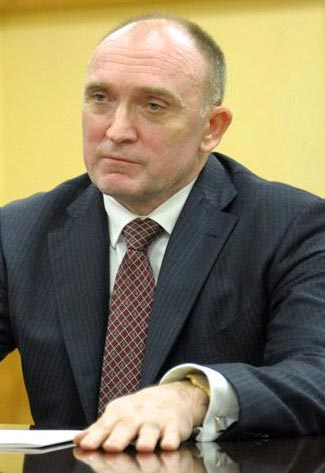
- Dubrovsky in 2014

Governor of Chelyabinsk Oblast
- In office 24 September 2014 – 19 March 2019
- Preceded by: Mikhail Yurevich
- Succeeded by: Aleksey Teksler

Personal details
- Born: Boris Aleksandrovich Dubrovsky; 22 November 1958 (age 67) Magnitogorsk, Russia, Soviet Union
- Party: Independent

Boris Aleksandrovich Dubrovsky (Russian:Борис Александрович Дубровский) (born November 22, 1958) is a Russian politician, metallurgical engineer, former CEO of the Magnitogorsk Iron and Steel Works (2011-2014). He served as Governor of Chelyabinsk Oblast from 2014 to 2019. He was accused of embezzlement of state funds in October 2019. In 2025, the Russian interior ministry issued an arrest warrant against him.
