= Ivan Belozertsev =

Russian politician

- Иван Белозерцев
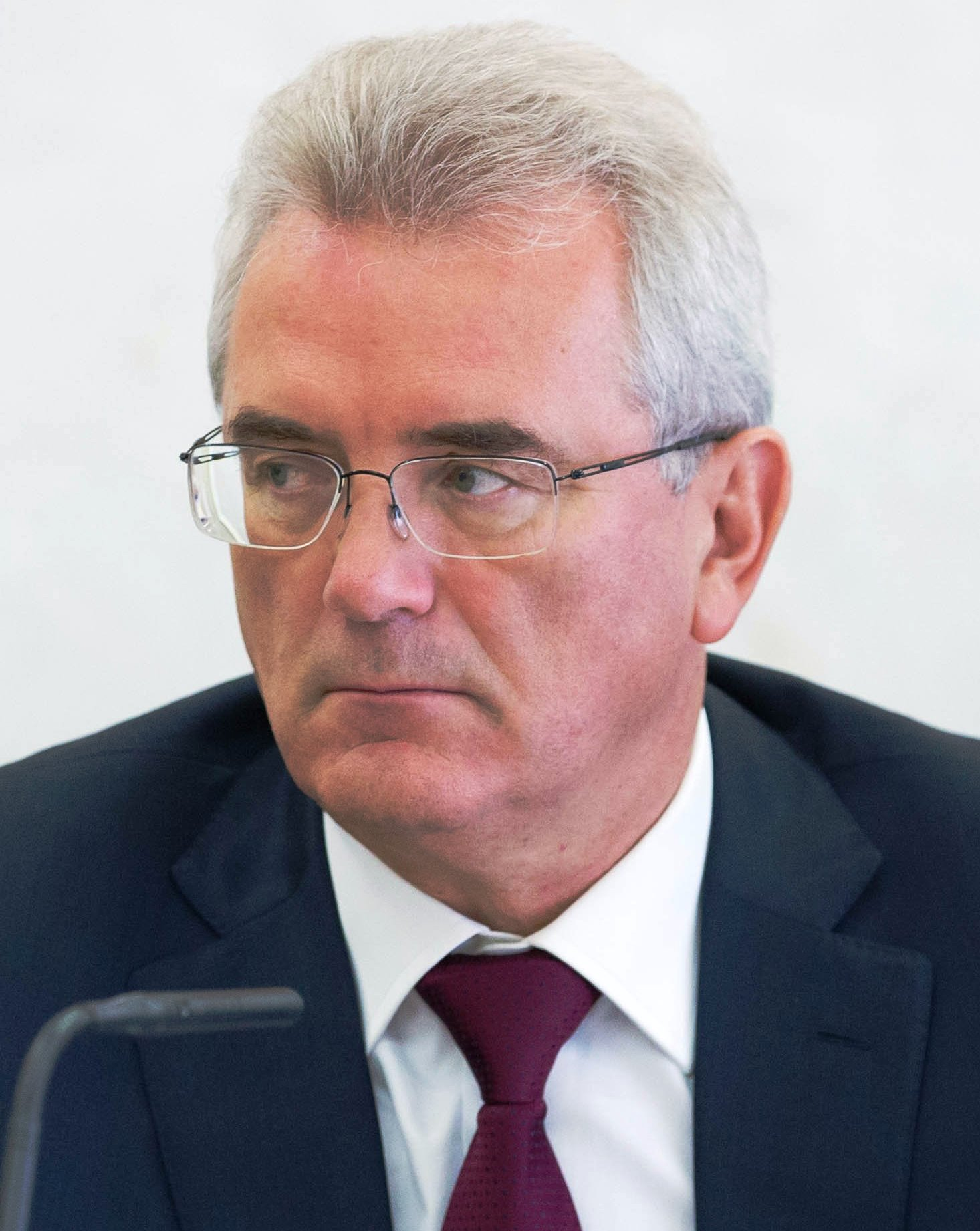
- Belozertsev in 2018

Governor of Penza Oblast
- In office 25 May 2015 – 23 March 2021
- Preceded by: Vasily Bochkaryov
- Succeeded by: Nikolay Simonov (acting)

Personal details
- Born: Ivan Aleksandrovich Belozertsev; 15 September 1958 (age 67) Baranovo, Russian SFSR, Soviet Union
- Party: United Russia

Ivan Aleksandrovich Belozertsev (Russian: Ива́н Алекса́ндрович Белозе́рцев; born 15 September 1958) is a Russian politician who served as governor of the Penza Oblast from 21 September 2015 until 23 March 2021 (and Acting Governor from 25 May 2015 until 20 September 2015). He was elected governor on 13 September 2015, having gained 86.04% (588,265) of the votes. Belozertsev was re-elected in 2020 with a 78.7% share of the vote.

Belozertsev was Chairman of the Legislative Assembly of the Penza Oblast in 2012–2015 and head of the Penza regional branch of the party United Russia in 2011–2015. Reserve Colonel.

On 21 March 2021 Belozertsev was detained on suspicion of taking bribes from pharmaceutical company CEO Boris Spiegel, including millions of rubles, a car, and a luxury watch, and placed in pre-trial detention until at least 20 May 2021. Large sums of cash, approximately RUB 300 mln, were found in Belozertsev's place of residence shortly after he was detained.

On the same day, a source in the United Russia party told the media that Belozertsev's membership in the party would be suspended if he is found guilty. However, on 22 March the party suspended his membership.

Belozertsev was fired from his post as governor of the Penza Oblast by Russian president Vladimir Putin on 23 March 2021.

== Criminal case ==
On March 21, 2021 Ivan Belozertsev was detained after searches were carried out at his and his relatives' homes as part of a criminal case on abuse of power. The Investigative Committee confirmed the detention of Ivan Belozertsev in the case of taking a bribe of more than 31 million rubles (part 5 of article 291, part 6 of article 290 of the Criminal Code) from businessman Boris Shpigel for providing the Biotek group of companies with competitive advantages when concluding government contracts. On March 22, the Basmanny Court of Moscow placed Belozertsev in custody until May 20.

On April 6, 2021 Belozertsev admitted to receiving money from Spiegel, but stressed that they were intended for the election campaign. At the same time, the ex-governor refused to plead guilty to the illegal possession of weapons found in his house during the search, explaining that he had a license.

On May 18, 2021 the Basmanny Court of Moscow granted the request of the investigation and extended the arrest of Ivan Belozertsev for three months (August 20). On August 17, 2021 Belozertsev's arrest was again extended by three months, until November 20. On November 15 the arrest of the former governor was once again extended, this time until February 20, 2022.

== Awards ==
- 2017 - Order of Honour
- 2010 - Medal of the Order of Merit for the Fatherland, II degree

In 2024 he was deprived of state awards by a court verdict.
