= Governor of Chelyabinsk Oblast =

Highest-ranking official in Chelyabinsk Oblast, Russia

- Coat of arms of Chelyabinsk Oblast

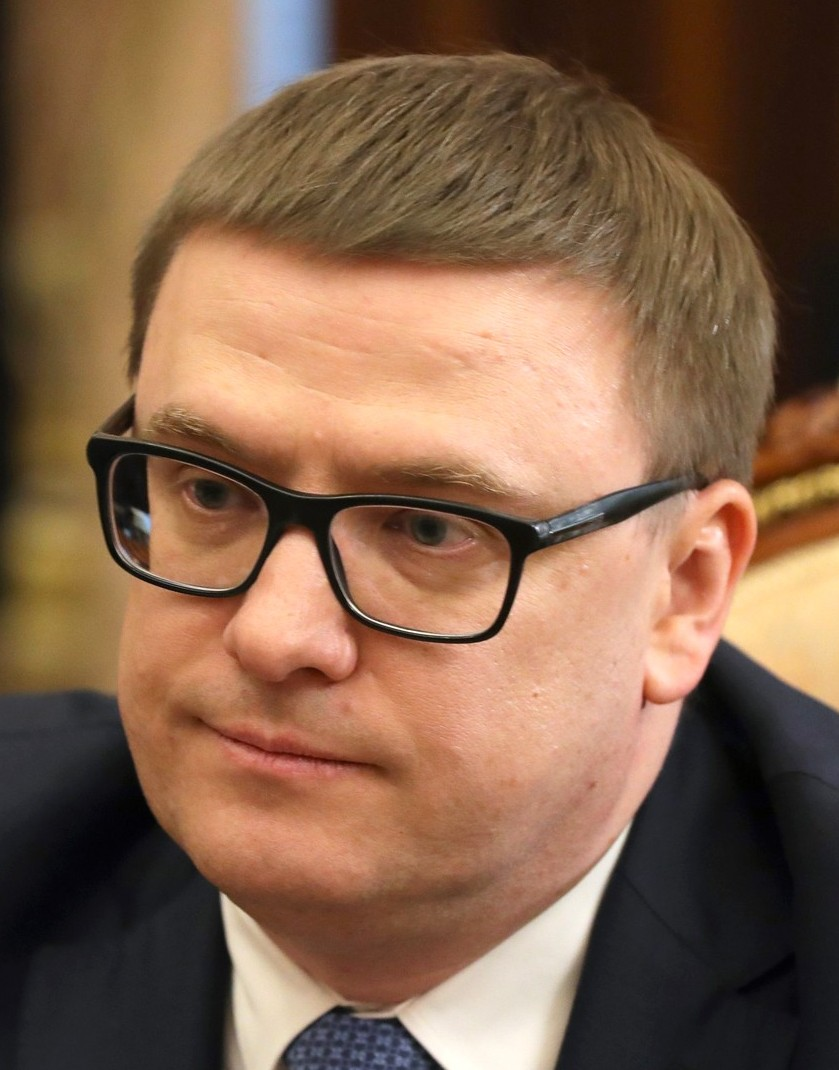
- Incumbent; Aleksey Teksler since 20 September 2019
- Residence: Chelyabinsk
- Term length: 5 years, one reelection possible
- Inaugural holder: Vadim Solovyov
- Formation: 1991
- Website: gubernator74.ru

The governor of Chelyabinsk Oblast (Russian: Губернатор Челябинской области) is the highest official of Chelyabinsk Oblast, a federal subject of Russia. The governor heads the executive branch in the region.

== History of office ==
In 1993 the first gubernatorial election was held in Chelyabinsk Oblast, after the Regional Council of People's Deputies passed a motion of no confidence against Head of Administration Vadim Solovyov. He immediately declared it illegal and refused to run. In June 1993 governor-elect Pyotr Sumin formed his own administration. It was recognized by most of the municipalities of Chelyabinsk Oblast, but not the federal government and president Boris Yeltsin, who reaffirmed Solovyov in office in October 1993.

In December 1996 Sumin won the election again, and was sworn in on 5 January 1997. In 2005 and 2010 governor was appointed by the Legislative Assembly from the candidates proposed by the President of Russia, as gubernatorial elections were abolished countrywide until 2012.

== List of officeholders ==
No.	Image	Governor	Tenure	Time in office	Party	Election
1		Vadim Solovyov (1947–2019)	24 October 1991 – 5 January 1997 (lost election)	5 years, 73 days	Independent	Appointed
–		Pyotr Sumin (1946–2011)	10 June 1993 – 22 October 1993 (in opposition)	134 days	Independent	1993
2		Pyotr Sumin (1946–2011)	5 January 1997 – 22 April 2010 (retired)	13 years, 107 days	Independent → United Russia	1996; 2000; 2005
3		Mikhail Yurevich (born 1969)	22 April 2010 – 15 January 2014 (resigned)	3 years, 268 days	United Russia	2010
–		Boris Dubrovsky (born 1958)	15 January 2014 – 24 September 2014	5 years, 63 days	United Russia	Acting
4		Boris Dubrovsky (born 1958)	24 September 2014 – 19 March 2019 (resigned)	5 years, 63 days	United Russia	2014
–		Aleksey Teksler (born 1973)	19 March 2019 – 20 September 2019	7 years, 172 days	Independent → United Russia	Acting
5		Aleksey Teksler (born 1973)	20 September 2019 – present	7 years, 172 days	Independent → United Russia	2019; 2024
