= Governor of the Jewish Autonomous Oblast =

Highest-ranking official in the Jewish Autonomous Oblast, Russia

- Coat of arms of the Jewish Autonomous Oblast

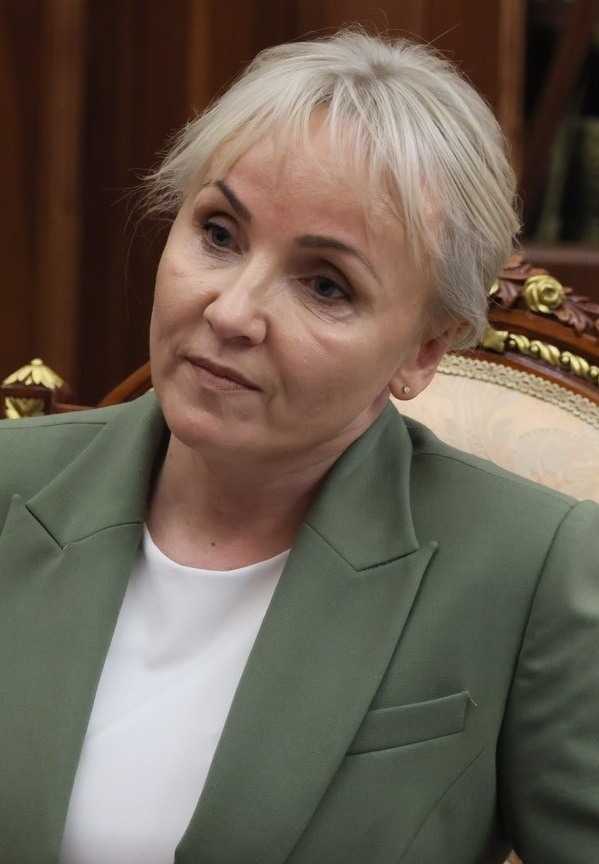
- Incumbent; Maria Kostyuk since 23 September 2025
- Residence: Birobidzhan
- Term length: Five years, renewable once
- Inaugural holder: Nikolay Volkov
- Formation: 1991
- Website: eao.ru

The Governor of the Jewish Autonomous Oblast (Russian: Губернатор Еврейской автономной области) is the head of executive branch for the Jewish Autonomous Oblast, considered as Prime Minister of the Jewish Autonomous Oblast.

The office of Governor is an elected position, for which elected officials serve four year terms. While individual politicians may serve as many terms as they can be elected to, Governors cannot be elected to more than two consecutive terms.

The official residence for the Governor is located in Birobidzhan. The current Governor is Maria Kostyuk. She was appointed as acting governor in November 2024 and elected by popular vote in September 2025 for full five-year term.

== Governors ==
No.	Image	Governor	Tenure	Time in office	Party	Election
1		Nikolay Volkov (born 1951)	14 December 1991 – 24 February 2010 (term end)	18 years, 72 days	Independent	Appointed 1996; 2000; 2005
1		Nikolay Volkov (born 1951)	14 December 1991 – 24 February 2010 (term end)	18 years, 72 days	United Russia	Appointed 1996; 2000; 2005
2		Alexander Vinnikov (born 1955)	24 February 2010 – 24 February 2015 (term end)	5 years, 0 days	United Russia	2010
—		Alexander Levintal (born 1957)	24 February 2015 – 22 September 2015	4 years, 291 days	United Russia	Acting
3		Alexander Levintal (born 1957)	22 September 2015 – 12 December 2019 (resigned)	4 years, 291 days	United Russia	2015
—		Rostislav Goldstein (born 1969)	12 December 2019 – 22 September 2020	4 years, 329 days	United Russia	Acting
4		Rostislav Goldstein (born 1969)	22 September 2020 – 5 November 2024 (resigned)	4 years, 329 days	United Russia	2020
—		Maria Kostyuk (born 1977)	5 November 2024 – 23 September 2025	1 year, 306 days	United Russia	Acting
5		Maria Kostyuk (born 1977)	23 September 2025 – present	1 year, 306 days	United Russia	2025

== Chairmen of Executive Committee (before 1991) ==
1. Iosif Liberberg (1934–1936)
2. Mikhail Kattel (1936–1937)
3. Miron Geller (1937–1938) (acting)
4. Nikolay Bigler (1938–1939) (acting)
5. Mikhail Zilbershteyn (1940–1947)
6. Mikhail Levitin (1947–1949)
7. Lew Benkovich (1949–1955)
8. F.T. Klimenko (1955–1961)
9. Grigory Podgayev (1961–1962)
10. Andrey Okovitov (1962–1971)
11. Sergey Duvakin (1971–1985)
12. Mark Kaufman (1985–1990)
13. Boris Korsunsky (1990–1991)

== Elections ==
=== 13 September 2020 ===
Candidates	Party	Votes	%
Rostislav Goldstein	self-nominated (supported by United Russia)	76,275	82.50
Vladimir Dudin	A Just Russia	6,533	7.07
Alexander Krupsky	Communist Party of Social Justice	3,957	4.28
Roman Kuzemsky	Patriots of Russia	1,171	1.27
Boris Tikhonov	Rodina	1,984	2.15

=== 13 September 2015 ===
Candidates	Party	Votes	%
Vladimir Dudin	A Just Russia	895	2.14
Konstantin Lazarev	Communist Party of the Russian Federation	6,018	14.37
Alexander Levintal	United Russia	31,577	75.42
Pavel Malyshev	Liberal Democratic Party of Russia	1,633	3.90
Tatyana Odyriy	Party of Pensioners' of Russia	682	1.63
