= 2012 in Russia =

- Decades: 1990s; 2000s; 2010s; 2020s
- See also: History of Russia; Timeline of Russian history; List of years in Russia

Events from the year 2012 in the Russia

== Incumbents ==
- President of Russia – Dmitry Medvedev (United Russia) (until 7 May), Vladimir Putin (United Russia) (from 7 May)
- Prime Minister of Russia – Vladimir Putin (United Russia) (until 7 May), Viktor Zubkov (7-8 May, acting), Dmitry Medvedev (United Russia) (from 8 May)

=== Governors ===
- Amur Oblast: Oleg Kozhemyako (ER)
- Arkhangelsk Oblast: Ilya Mikhalchuk (until January 13, ER), Igor Orlov (starting January 13, ER)
- Astrakhan Oblast: Alexander Zhilkin (ER)
- Belgorod Oblast: Yevgeny Savchenko (ER)
- Bryansk Oblast: Nikolay Denin (ER)
- Chelyabinsk Oblast: Mikhail Yurevich (ER)
- Irkutsk Oblast: Dmitry Mezentsev (until May 18, ER), Sergey Yeroshenko (starting May 18, ER)
- Ivanovo Oblast: Mikhail Men (ER)
- Kaliningrad Oblast: Nikolay Tsukanov (ER)
- Kaluga Oblast: Anatoly Artamonov (ER)
- Kemerovo Oblast: Aman Tuleyev (ER)
- Kirov Oblast: Nikita Belykh (Independent)
- Kostroma Oblast: Igor Slyunyayev (until April 13, ER), Sergey Sitnikov (starting April 13, ER)
- Kurgan Oblast: Oleg Bogomolov (ER)
- Kursk Oblast: Aleksandr Mikhailov (ER)
- Leningrad Oblast: Valery Serdyukov (until May 28, ER), Alexander Drozdenko (starting May 28, ER)
- Lipetsk Oblast: Oleg Korolyov (ER)
- Magadan Oblast: Nikolai Dudov (ER)
- Moscow Oblast: Boris Gromov (until May 11, ER), Sergey Shoygu (May 11–November 6, ER), Andrey Vorobyov (starting November 8, ER)
- Murmansk Oblast: Dmitry Dmitrienko (until April 4, ER), Marina Kovtun (starting April 4, ER)
- Nizhny Novgorod Oblast: Valery Shantsev (ER)
- Novgorod Oblast: Sergey Mitin (ER)
- Novosibirsk Oblast: Vasily Yurchenko (ER)
- Omsk Oblast: Leonid Polezhayev (until May 30, ER), Viktor Nazarov (starting May 30, ER)
- Orenburg Oblast: Yury Berg (ER)
- Oryol Oblast: Alexander Kozlov (ER)
- Penza Oblast: Vasily Bochkarev (ER)
- Pskov Oblast: Andrey Turchak (ER)
- Rostov Oblast: Vasily Golubev (ER)
- Ryazan Oblast: Oleg Kovalyov (ER)
- Sakhalin Oblast: Alexander Khoroshavin (ER)
- Samara Oblast: Vladimir Artemyakov (until May 10, ER), Nikolai Merkushkin (starting May 10, ER)
- Saratov Oblast: Pavel Ipatov (until March 23, ER), Valery Radaev (starting March 23, ER)
- Smolensk Oblast: Sergey Antufyev (until April 20, ER), Alexey Ostrovsky (starting April 20, LDPR)
- Tambov Oblast: Oleg Betin (ER)
- Tomsk Oblast: Viktor Kress (until March 17, ER), Sergey Zhvachkin (starting March 17, ER)
- Tula Oblast: Vladimir Gruzdev (ER)
- Tver Oblast: Andrey Shevelyov (ER)
- Tyumen Oblast: Vladimir Yakushev (ER)
- Ulyanovsk Oblast: Sergey Morozov (ER)
- Vladimir Oblast: Nikolay Vinogradov (CPRF)
- Volgograd Oblast: Anatoly Brovko (until January 17, ER), Sergey Bozhenov (starting January 22, ER)
- Vologda Oblast: Oleg Kuvshinnikov (ER)
- Voronezh Oblast: Alexey Gordeyev (ER)
- Yaroslavl Oblast: Sergey Vakhrukov (until April 28, ER), Sergey Yastrebov (starting April 28, ER)
- Jewish Autonomous Oblast: Alexander Vinnikov (ER)

== Events ==
=== January ===
- January 5 – Russia loses to Sweden 1–0 in overtime in the 2012 World Junior Ice Hockey Championship.
- January 9 – Insurgency in the North Caucasus: Clashes occur between the Russian forces and Islamist militants in the Vedensky District, Chechnya, with reportedly 8 killed and 16 wounded.
- January 15 – Russia's unmanned Fobos-Grunt space probe re-enters the Earth's atmosphere after a failed mission to the Martian moon Phobos. The 13-ton spacecraft disintegrates over the southern Pacific Ocean at approximately 16:45 UTC. China's first Mars probe, Yinghuo-1, which was launched together with Fobos-Grunt, is also destroyed.
- January 27 – Insurgency in the North Caucasus: 13 people are killed in three separate clashes between the Russian forces and Islamist militants in the Russian republics of Ingushetia, Dagestan, and Kabardino-Balkariya.

=== February ===
- February 13–17 – 2012 Nozhay-Yurtovsky District clashes.
- February 27 – The 2012 Astrakhan gas explosion occurs

=== March ===
- March 4 – The 2012 Presidential election is held.
- March 20–24 – The 2012 Russian Artistic Gymnastics Championships took place

=== April ===
- April 2 – UTair Flight 120 crashed
- April 26–29 – The 2012 European Judo Championships took place

=== May ===
- May 3 – The 2012 Makhachkala attack occurs
- May 7 – Putin was inaugurated as President
- May 8 – Medvedev appointed as Prime Minister and later he became leader of the United Russia Party
- May 21 – new cabinet was formed.

=== June ===
- June 3–4 – The European Union-Russia Summit in Saint Petersburg.
- June - Moscow courts enacted a hundred-year ban on gay pride parades.

=== July ===
- July – The Russian foreign agent law bill is introduced by legislators from the governing United Russia party.
- July 20 – The Russian foreign agent law is signed into law by President Vladimir Putin. The law requires non-profit organizations that receive foreign donations and engage in "political activity" to register and declare themselves as foreign agents
- Stavropol region has a ban on hijabs in schools. the first of its kind imposed by a region in the Russian federation. The ruling was upheld by Russia's Supreme Court in July 2013.

=== August ===
- August 22 – Russia became the 156th member of the World Trade Organization.

=== October ===
- October – The Donguz explosion occurs
- October 14 – A second round of regional elections were held

=== November ===
- November 4 – National unity day
- November 7 – The 2012 Moscow shooting occurs

=== December ===
- December 6–9 – The 2012–13 Grand Prix of Figure Skating Final took place
- December 13–16 – The 2012 Channel One Cup took place
- December 25–28 – The 2013 Russian Figure Skating Championships took place
- December 29 – Red Wings Airlines Flight 9268 crashed at Moscow Vnukovo Airport

== Notable deaths ==
Lyudmila Kasatkina

=== January ===
- January 2 – Anatoly Kolesov, 73, wrestler, Olympic gold medalist (1964), after long illness. (born 1938)
- January 2 – Ivan Calin, 76, Moldovan politician, Acting President of the Moldovan Parliament (2009).
- January 3 – Stepan Oshchepkov, 77, canoeist, Olympic gold medalist (1964). (born 1934)
- January 5 – Alexander Sizonenko, 52, Russian basketball player, world's tallest person (1991).
- January 8 – Dmitry Machinsky, 74, Russian archaeologist.
- January 9 – Pyotr Vasilevsky, 55, Belarusian football player and coach.
- January 14 – Zelemkhan Zangiyev, 37, Russian footballer.
- January 15 – Eduard Ivanov, 73, Soviet ice hockey player, World and Olympic champion.
- January 16 – Valentin Rusantsov, 72, Primate of the Russian Orthodox Autonomous Church (1996–2012).
- January 25 – Alexander Zhitinsky, 71, Russian writer.
- January 27 – Dzhamaleim Mutaliyev, 35, Russian rebel leader, shot.

=== February ===
- February 6 – Vitaly Gorelik, 44, Russian mountaineer, heart attack.
- February 11 – Sergey Kolosov, 90, Russian film director, People's Artist of the USSR.
- February 17 – Tatyana Golikova, 66, Russian ballerina (Bolshoi Ballet).
- February 20 –
  - Asar Eppel, 77, Russian translator, stroke.
  - Vitaly Vorotnikov, 86, Soviet politician, Chairman of the Presidium of the Supreme Soviet of the Russian SFSR (1988–1990).
- February 22 – Lyudmila Kasatkina, 86, Russian actress, People's Artist of the USSR.

=== March ===
- March 21 – Marina Salye, Russian geologist and politician.
- March 27 – Anatoly Kikin, Soviet and Russian footballer and coach.
- March 27 – Alim Zankishiev, Russian insurgent, leader in the Caucasus Emirate.
- March 28 – Eduard Steinberg, 76, Russian painter.
- March 28 – Sergey Solnechnikov, Russian military officer.
- March 30 – Viktor Kosichkin, Russian Olympic speed skating gold and silver medalist.
- March 30 – Leonid Shebarshin, Russian KGB interim Chairman.

=== June ===
- June 4 – Eduard Khil, 77, Russian baritone singer.

=== July ===
- July 13 – Raisa Belskikh, 78, Russian agronomist.

=== December ===
- December 11 – Galina Vishnevskaya, Russian opera soprano and Bolshoi Theatre soloist

== See also ==
- List of Russian films of 2012
