= 2022 Russian gubernatorial elections =

← 2021	11 September 2022	2023 →

15 heads of federal subjects

Gubernatorial elections were held in Russia on 11 September 2022 in 15 federal subjects. Seven incumbent governors were seeking re-election.

Three regions, namely Tambov, Vladimir and Yaroslavl oblasts, had their governors resigned in October 2021. On 10 May 2022, the incumbent governors of five other regions announced their resignations: Valery Radayev of Saratov Oblast and Sergey Zhvachkin of Tomsk Oblast finished their second term early, while Alexander Yevstifeyev of Mari El, Nikolay Lyubimov of Ryazan Oblast and Igor Vasilyev of Kirov Oblast resigned shortly before the end of the first five-year term.

== Race summary ==
=== Popular vote ===
Region	Incumbent	Status	Last race	Result
Buryatia	Alexey Tsydenov (UR)	Incumbent re-elected	2017: 87.4%	86.2%
Karelia	Artur Parfenchikov (UR)	Incumbent re-elected	2017: 61.3%	69.2%
Mari El	Alexander Yevstifeyev (IND)	Resigned	2017: 88.3%	—
Mari El	Yury Zaitsev (IND)	Acting Head elected to full term	—	82.4%
Udmurtia	Aleksandr Brechalov (UR)	Incumbent re-elected	2017: 78.2%	64.4%
Kaliningrad Oblast	Anton Alikhanov (UR)	Incumbent re-elected	2017: 81.0%	80.2%
Kirov Oblast	Igor Vasilyev (UR)	Resigned	2017: 64.0%	—
Kirov Oblast	Aleksandr Sokolov (UR)	Acting Governor elected to full term	—	71.9%
Novgorod Oblast	Andrey Nikitin (UR)	Incumbent re-elected	2017: 68.0%	77.0%
Ryazan Oblast	Nikolay Lyubimov (UR)	Resigned	2017: 80.1%	—
Ryazan Oblast	Pavel Malkov (UR)	Acting Governor elected to full term	—	84.6%
Saratov Oblast	Valery Radayev (UR)	Resigned	2017: 74.6%	—
Saratov Oblast	Roman Busargin (UR)	Acting Governor elected to full term	—	72.6%
Sverdlovsk Oblast	Yevgeny Kuyvashev (UR)	Incumbent re-elected	2017: 62.2%	65.8%
Tambov Oblast	Aleksandr Nikitin (UR)	Resigned	2020: 79.3%	—
Tambov Oblast	Maksim Yegorov (UR)	Acting Governor elected to full term	—	85.0%
Tomsk Oblast	Sergey Zhvachkin (UR)	Resigned	2017: 60.6%	—
Tomsk Oblast	Vladimir Mazur (UR)	Acting Governor elected to full term	—	84.9%
Vladimir Oblast	Vladimir Sipyagin (LDPR)	Resigned	2018: 31.2% (first round), 57.0% (second round)	—
Vladimir Oblast	Aleksandr Avdeyev (UR)	Acting Governor elected to full term	—	83.7%
Yaroslavl Oblast	Dmitry Mironov (UR)	Resigned	2017: 79.3%	—
Yaroslavl Oblast	Mikhail Yevrayev (IND)	Acting Governor elected to full term	—	82.3%

=== Vote in parliament ===
Region	Incumbent	Status	Last race	Result
Adygea	Murat Kumpilov (UR)	Incumbent re-elected	2017: 48/48	Murat Kumpilov 49 / 49

== See also ==
- Elections in Russia
