= 2022 Tomsk Oblast gubernatorial election =

- 10–11 September 2022
- Turnout: 30.93%
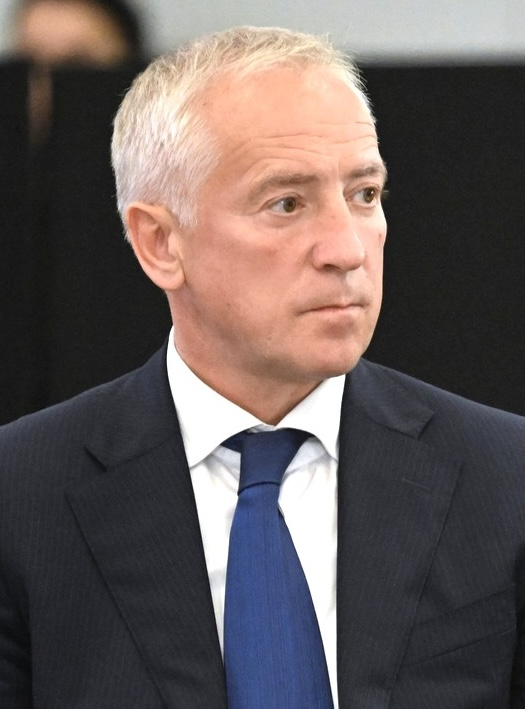

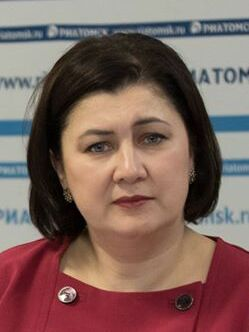

| Nominee | Vladimir Mazur | Galina Nemtseva | Andrey Petrov |
| Party | United Russia | SR-ZP | CPRF |
| Popular vote | 198,829 | 14,243 | 12,438 |
| Percentage | 84.94% | 6.08% | 5.31% |
Governor before election
Vladimir Mazur (acting)
United Russia
Governor
Vladimir Mazur
United Russia

The 2022 Tomsk Oblast gubernatorial election took place on 10–11 September 2022, on common election day. Acting Governor Vladimir Mazur was elected to a full term.

== Background ==
Sergey Zhvachkin was appointed Governor of Tomsk Oblast in 2012, when he replaced 21-year incumbent Viktor Kress in the position. Zhvachkin won his second term in 2017 election with 60.58% of the vote. Zhvachkin's "soft" style of governance heavily contrasted other heads of Russian regions, which allowed opposition to strengthen. In 2020, United Russia won only 11 seats out of 37 in the Tomsk Duma elections, while two members of Navalny's team were elected. In the 2021 Russian legislative election, United Russia won 32.70% in Tomsk Oblast, its 10th worst result nationally. On 10 May 2022, Zhvachkin asked for his resignation, Deputy Head of Presidential Office for Domestic Policy Vladimir Mazur was appointed acting Governor of Tomsk Oblast.

Due to the start of the Russian invasion of Ukraine in February 2022 and subsequent economic sanctions, the cancellation and postponement of direct gubernatorial elections was proposed. The measure was even supported by A Just Russia leader Sergey Mironov. Eventually, on 9 June Legislative Duma of Tomsk Oblast called the gubernatorial election for 11 September 2022.

== Candidates ==
Only political parties can nominate candidates for gubernatorial election in Tomsk Oblast, self-nomination is not possible. However, candidates are not obliged to be members of the nominating party. Candidate for Governor of Tomsk Oblast should be a Russian citizen and at least 30 years old. Each candidate in order to be registered is required to collect at least 10% of signatures of members and heads of municipalities (146 signatures). Also gubernatorial candidates present 3 candidacies to the Federation Council and election winner later appoints one of the presented candidates.

=== Registered ===
- Viktor Grinev (RPPSS), lawyer, chair of RPPSS regional office
- Vladimir Mazur (United Russia), acting Governor of Tomsk Oblast, former Deputy Head of Presidential Office for Domestic Policy (2020-2022)
- Galina Nemtseva (SR-ZP), Member of Legislative Duma of Tomsk Oblast, former Member of State Duma (2016)
- Andrey Petrov (CPRF), Deputy Chairman of Duma of Tomsk, former Member of Legislative Duma of Tomsk Oblast (2011-2015)

=== Eliminated at convention ===
- Viktor Kress (United Russia), Senator of Federation Council, former Governor of Tomsk Oblast (1991-2012)
- Ivan Pushkaryov (United Russia), Member of Legislative Duma of Tomsk Oblast, general director of Tomsk Electromechanical Factory
- Viktor Rulevsky (United Russia), Member of Legislative Duma of Tomsk Oblast, Rector of TUSUR

=== Declined ===
- Aleksey Didenko (LDPR), Member of State Duma, Chairman of the Duma Committee on Regional Policy and Local Government, 2017 gubernatorial candidate

=== Candidates for Federation Council ===
- Viktor Grinev (RPPSS):
  - Sergey Naumchik, entrepreneur
  - Sergey Semenyako, FSB pensioner
  - Larisa Shevtsova, pensioner
- Vladimir Mazur (United Russia):
  - Mikhail Kiselyov, Member of State Duma
  - Viktor Kress, incumbent Senator
  - Andrey Makarenko, Rector of Tomsk State Pedagogical University
- Galina Nemtseva (SR-ZP):
  - Yury Polonyankin, nonprofit executive
  - Aleksandr Rostovtsev, former Member of Legislative Duma of Tomsk Oblast (2016-2020), 2017 gubernatorial candidate
  - Marat Valeyev, Member of Legislative Duma of Tomsk Oblast
- Andrey Petrov (CPRF):
  - Natalya Baryshnikova, Member of Legislative Duma of Tomsk Oblast, 2017 gubernatorial candidate
  - Vladimir Cholakhyan, Member of Duma of Tomsk
  - Maksim Luchshev, Member of Legislative Duma of Tomsk Oblast

== Finances ==
All sums are in rubles.

| Financial Report | Source | Grinev | Mazur | Nemtseva | Petrov |
|---|---|---|---|---|---|
| First | | 21,000 | 66,000,000 | 50,000 | 20,000 |
| Final | | 13,121,000 | 66,001,000 | 1,731,000 | 1,770,000 |

== Results ==
Summary of the 10–11 September 2022 Tomsk Oblast gubernatorial election results
| Candidate | Party | Votes | % |
|---|---|---|---|
| Vladimir Mazur (incumbent) | United Russia | 198,829 | 84.94 |
| Galina Nemtseva | A Just Russia — For Truth | 14,243 | 6.08 |
| Andrey Petrov | Communist Party | 12,438 | 5.31 |
| Viktor Grinev | Party of Pensioners | 4,938 | 2.11 |
| Valid votes | | 230,448 | 98.45 |
| Blank ballots | | 3,621 | 1.55 |
| Total | | 234,069 | 100.00 |
| Turnout | | 234,069 | 30.93 |
| Registered voters | | 756,779 | 100.00 |

Incumbent Senator Viktor Kress (United Russia) was re-appointed to the Federation Council.

== See also ==
- 2022 Russian gubernatorial elections
