= 2022 Kirov Oblast gubernatorial election =

← 2017	10–11 September 2022	2027 →
- Turnout: 33.34%
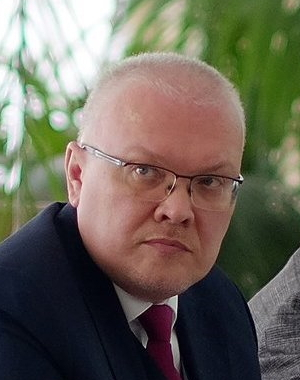

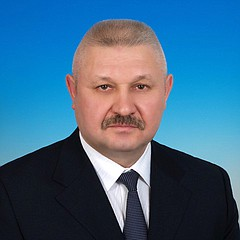
			LDPR
Nominee	Aleksandr Sokolov	Sergey Mamayev	Vladimir Ponaryev
Party	United Russia	CPRF	LDPR
Popular vote	243,492	45,469	20,773
Percentage	71.85%	13.42%	6.13%
Governor before election
Aleksandr Sokolov (acting)
United Russia
Elected Governor
Aleksandr Sokolov
United Russia

The 2022 Kirov Oblast gubernatorial election took place on 10–11 September 2022, on common election day. Acting Governor Aleksandr Sokolov was elected for a full term.

== Background ==
Rosreestr Head Igor Vasilyev was appointed Governor of Kirov Oblast in July 2016, replacing Nikita Belykh, who was arrested for taking a bribe. In September 2017 Vasilyev won the election with 64.03% of the vote.

Governor Vasilyev's single term was accompanied by poor management and "disastrous" personal ratings. Vasilyev's position was also weakened by a major corruption scandal in 2020, when Vice Governor Andrey Plitko, Vasliyev's trustee, and Ministry of Forestry Aleksey Shurgin were arrested for bribery. In the 2021 Russian legislative election United Russia scored only 29.54% of the vote in Kirov Oblast, party's 4th worst result nationally. Among rumoured candidates for replacement of Vasilyev were federal Minister of Health Mikhail Murashko, Deputy Presidential Envoy to the Volga Federal District Oleg Mashkovtsev, Rosatom top-manager Mikhail Sandalov and FSB First Deputy Director Sergey Korolev. On 10 May 2022 Igor Vasilyev asked for his resignation along four other governors, Presidential Administration official Aleksandr Sokolov was appointed acting Governor of Kirov Oblast.

Due to the start of the Russian invasion of Ukraine in February 2022 and subsequent economic sanctions the cancellation and postponement of direct gubernatorial elections was proposed. The measure was even supported by A Just Russia leader Sergey Mironov. Eventually, on 9 June Legislative Assembly of Kirov Oblast called gubernatorial election for 11 September 2022.

== Candidates ==
In Kirov Oblast candidates for Governor can be nominated by registered political parties or by self-nomination. Candidate for Governor of Kirov Oblast should be a Russian citizen and at least 30 years old. Candidates for Governor should not have a foreign citizenship or residence permit. Each candidate in order to be registered is required to collect at least 5% of signatures of members and heads of municipalities. In addition self-nominated candidates should collect 0.5% of signatures of Kirov Oblast residents (around 5,000 signatures). Also gubernatorial candidates present 3 candidacies to the Federation Council and election winner later appoints one of the presented candidates.

=== Registered ===
- Fyodor Luginin (Rodina), chairman of Rodina regional office
- Sergey Mamayev (CPRF), Member of Legislative Assembly of Kirov Oblast, former Member of State Duma (2011-2016), 2014 and 2017 gubernatorial candidate, 2015 Mari El head candidate
- Yury Moiseyev (Communists of Russia), Member of Tula Oblast Duma, 2021 Tula Oblast gubernatorial candidate
- Vladimir Ponaryev (LDPR), Member of Legislative Assembly of Kirov Oblast
- Aleksandr Sokolov (United Russia), acting Governor of Kirov Oblast, former Deputy Governor of Kostroma Oblast (2014-2017)

=== Did not file ===
- Anton Dolgikh (Independent), lawyer, 2017 gubernatorial candidate
- Ilya Ulyanov (Independent), Deputy Chairman of the Central Committee of Communists of Russia party, former Member of Supreme Council of the Republic of Khakassia (2013-2018), perennial candidate

=== Declined ===
- Vladimir Kostin (LDPR), Member of Legislative Assembly of Kirov Oblast
- Bagir Sharifov, businessman
- Nadezhda Surayeva (SR-ZP), Member of Kirov City Duma, deputy general director of Kirov Dairy Plant (switched to LDPR)

=== Candidates for Federation Council ===
- Sergey Mamayev (CPRF):
  - Vladimir Komoyedov, former Member of State Duma (2007-2016), retired Admiral
  - Zhanna Simonova, professor at Kirov State Medical University
  - Marina Sozontova, former Deputy Speaker of Legislative Assembly of Kirov Oblast (2011-2016)
- Vladimir Ponaryev (LDPR):
  - Vladimir Kostin, Member of Legislative Assembly of Kirov Oblast
  - Vladimir Malkov, coordinator of LDPR regional office
  - Olga Tyrykina, Member of Legislative Assembly of Kirov Oblast
- Aleksandr Sokolov (United Russia):
  - Viktor Bondarev, incumbent Senator, Chair of Council Committee on Defense and Security
  - Olesya Redkina (SR-ZP), Member of Legislative Assembly of Kirov Oblast, chief doctor at Kirov Infectious Diseases Hospital
  - Natalya Shedko, Deputy Chair of Civic Chamber of Kirov Oblast

== Finances ==
All sums are in rubles.

Financial Report	Source	Dolgikh	Luginin	Mamayev	Moiseyev	Ponaryev	Sokolov	Ulyanov
First		TBA	30,000	75,000	30,000	20,000	20,050,000	TBA
Final		TBD	49,319	1,260,000	30,000	1,471,000	45,000,000	13,000,000

== Results ==
Summary of the 10–11 September 2022 Kirov Oblast gubernatorial election results
Candidate	Party	Votes	%
Aleksandr Sokolov (incumbent)	United Russia	243,492	71.85
Sergey Mamayev	Communist Party	45,469	13.42
Vladimir Ponaryev	Liberal Democratic Party	20,773	6.13
Fyodor Luginin	Rodina	15,894	4.69
Yury Moiseyev	Communists of Russia	5,253	1.55
Valid votes		330,881	97.63
Blank ballots		8,017	2.37
Total		338,898	100.00
Turnout		338,898	33.34
Registered voters		1,016,583	100.00

Incumbent Senator Viktor Bondarev (Independent) was re-appointed to the Federation Council.

== See also ==
- 2022 Russian gubernatorial elections
