= 2026 Kirov Oblast legislative election =

Regional legislative election in Russia

- 18–20 September 2026

All 45 seats in the Legislative Assembly 23 seats needed for a majority
- Turnout: 49.43% ▲4.94 pp
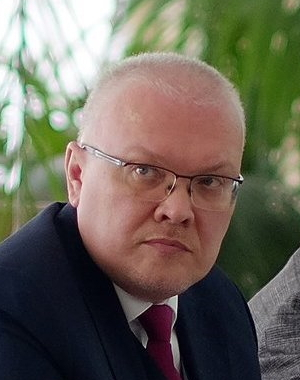

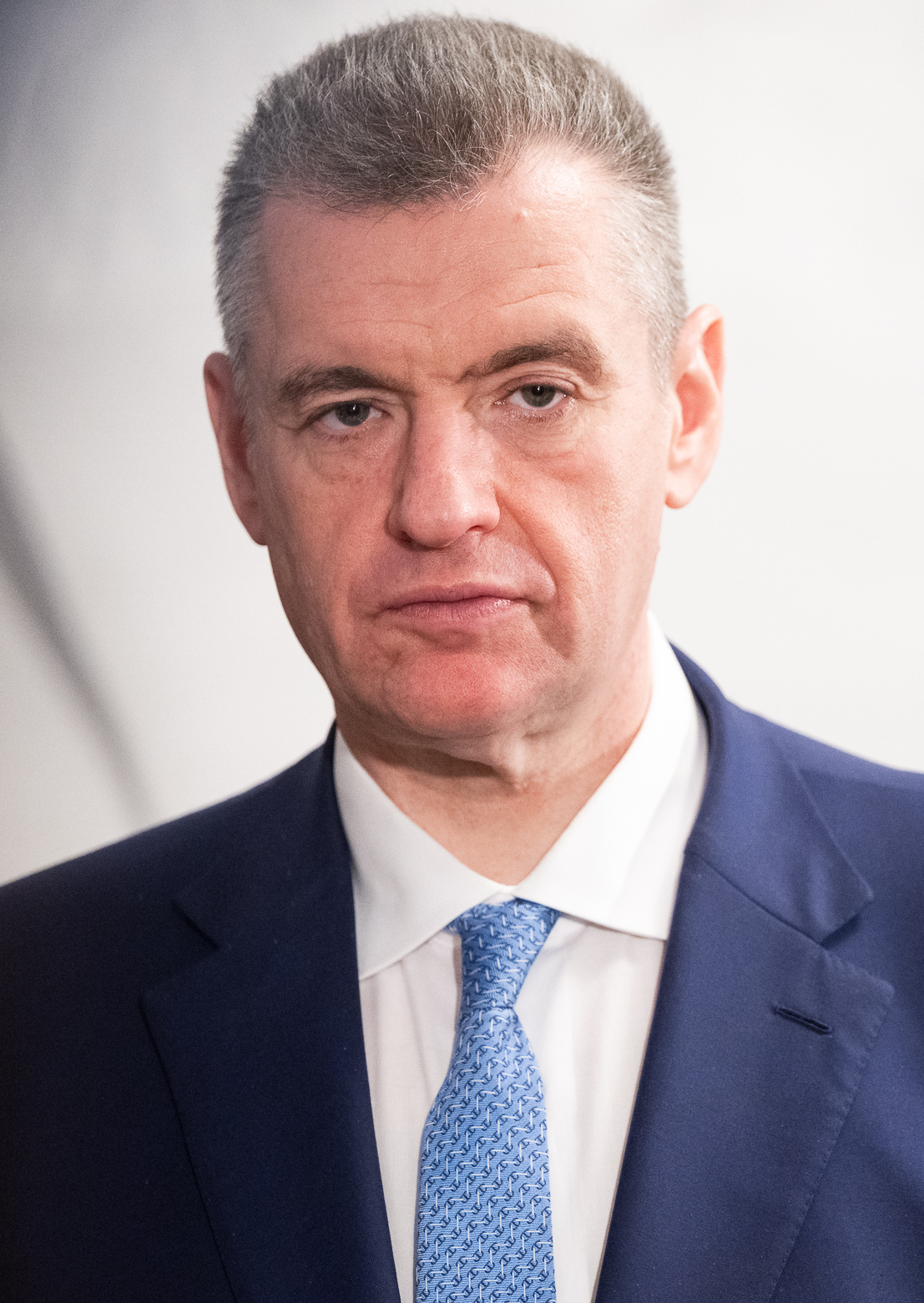

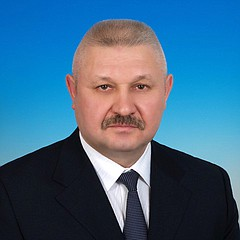
	Majority party	Minority party	Third party
Candidate	Aleksandr Sokolov	Leonid Slutsky	Sergey Mamayev
Party	United Russia	LDPR	CPRF
Last election	27.26%, 24 seats	13.78%, 3 seats	17.75%, 2 seats
Seats won	31	4	2
Seat change	▲7	▲1	Steady
Popular vote	162,676	94,150	78,984
Percentage	33.50%	19.39%	16.26%
Swing	▲6.24 pp	▲5.61 pp	▼1.49 pp
	Fourth party	Fifth party	Sixth party
	NL	SR	RPPSS
Candidate	Andrey Iglin	Yekaterina Kolotova	Aleksandr Markov
Party	New People	A Just Russia	Party of Pensioners
Last election	8.79%, 1 seat	19.68%, 9 seats	6.16%, 1 seat
Seats won	4	2	1
Seat change	▲3	▼7	Steady
Popular vote	58,335	40,515	25,559
Percentage	12.01%	8.34%	5.26%
Swing	▲3.22 pp	▼11.34 pp	▼0.90 pp
Chairman before election
Roman Beresnev
United Russia
Elected Chairman
Roman Beresnev
United Russia
Senator before election
Vyacheslav Timchenko
United Russia
Senator after election
Vyacheslav Timchenko
United Russia

The 2026 Legislative Assembly of Kirov Oblast election took place on 18–20 September 2026, on common election day, coinciding with the 2026 Russian legislative election. All 45 seats in the Legislative Assembly were up for re-election.

United Russia increased its majority in the Legislative Assembly, winning 33.5% of the vote and 25 single-mandate constituencies. A Just Russia suffered a major defeat, dropping from 2nd to 5th place in vote share and losing seven seats. New People gained one party-list seat and two single-mandate constituencies, while Liberal Democratic Party of Russia came in second and gained one seat.

== Electoral system ==
Under current election laws, the Legislative Assembly is elected for a term of five years, with parallel voting. 15 seats are elected by party-list proportional representation with a 5% electoral threshold (up from 13 seats in 2021), with the other part elected in 30 single-member constituencies by first-past-the-post voting (up from 27 seats in 2021). Seats in the proportional part are allocated using the Imperiali quota, modified to ensure that every party list, which passes the threshold, receives at least one mandate.

== Candidates ==
=== Party lists ===
To register regional lists of candidates, parties need to collect 0.5% of signatures of all registered voters in Kirov Oblast.

The following parties were relieved from the necessity to collect signatures:

- United Russia
- Communist Party of the Russian Federation
- Liberal Democratic Party of Russia
- A Just Russia
- New People
- Russian Party of Pensioners for Social Justice
- Communists of Russia

№	Party	Oblast-wide list	Candidates	Territorial groups	Status
1	Liberal Democratic Party	Leonid Slutsky • Pavel Dorofeyev • Olga Tyrykina	33	10	Registered
2	A Just Russia	Yekaterina Kolotova • Aleksandr Nikulin • Tatyana Yerdyakova	33	10	Registered
3	Party of Pensioners	Aleksandr Markov • Aleksandr Bushmakin • Larisa Strinadyuk	33	10	Registered
4	New People	Andrey Iglin • Aleksandr Balabanov • Anna Alminova	33	10	Registered
5	Communists of Russia	Sergey Malinkovich • Sergey Nikonov • Vladimir Badmayev	33	10	Registered
6	Communist Party	Sergey Mamayev • Yury Vylegzhanin • Yekaterina Selezneva	33	8	Registered
7	United Russia	Aleksandr Sokolov • Anastasia Bortsova • Vyacheslav Timchenko	33	10	Registered

=== Single-mandate constituencies ===
30 single-mandate constituencies were formed in Kirov Oblast, three additional constituencies in Kirov were created in 2025. To register candidates in single-mandate constituencies need to collect 3% of signatures of registered voters in the constituency.

Number of candidates in single-mandate constituencies
Party	Candidates	
Party	Nominated	Registered
United Russia	30	30
A Just Russia	28	26
Communist Party	29	28
Liberal Democratic Party	30	30
New People	29	28
Party of Pensioners	26	22
Communists of Russia	28	28
Independent	1	0
Total	201	192

== Results ==
=== Results by party lists ===
Summary of the 18–20 September 2026 Legislative Assembly of Kirov Oblast election results
Party	Party list					Constituency		Total	
Party	Votes	%	±pp	Seats	+/–	Seats	+/–	Seats	+/–
United Russia	162,676	33.50	▲6.24	6	▲2	25	▲5	31	▲7
Liberal Democratic Party	94,150	19.39	▲5.61	3	▲1	1	Steady	4	▲1
Communist Party	78,984	16.26	▼1.49	2	Steady	0	Steady	2	Steady
New People	58,335	12.01	▲3.22	2	▲1	2	New	4	▲3
A Just Russia	40,515	8.34	▼11.34	1	▼2	1	▼5	2	▼7
Party of Pensioners	25,559	5.26	▼0.90	1	Steady	0	New	1	Steady
Communists of Russia	11,057	2.28	▼0.92	0	Steady	0	Steady	0	Steady
Invalid ballots	14,336	2.95	▼0.43	—	—	—	—	—	—
Total	485,612	100.00	—	15	▲2	30	▲3	45	▲5
Turnout	485,612	49.43	▲4.94	—	—	—	—	—	—
Registered voters	982,436	100.00	—	—	—	—	—	—	—

Roman Beresnev (United Russia) was re-elected as Chairman of the Legislative Assembly, while incumbent Senator Vyacheslav Timchenko (United Russia) was re-appointed to the Federation Council.

=== Results in single-member constituencies ===
==== District 1 ====
Summary of the 18–20 September 2026 Legislative Assembly of Kirov Oblast election in Afanasyevsky constituency No.1
Candidate	Party	Votes	%
Andrey Mityashin	United Russia	4,760	35.88%
Danil Bykovsky	Communist Party	2,327	17.54%
Aleksandr Babikov	Liberal Democratic Party	2,102	15.84%
Natalya Kochkina	A Just Russia	1,171	8.83%
Anton Ovchinnikov	Party of Pensioners	962	7.25%
Yakov Solomennikov	New People	691	5.21%
Aleksandr Sorokin	Communists of Russia	623	4.70%
Total		13,267	100%

==== District 2 ====
Summary of the 18–20 September 2026 Legislative Assembly of Kirov Oblast election in Podosinovsky constituency No.2
Candidate	Party	Votes	%
Andrey Makarov	United Russia	5,636	38.19%
Antonina Klimova	Liberal Democratic Party	3,827	25.93%
Aleksandr Popov	Communist Party	1,702	11.53%
Marina Naumova	Communists of Russia	1,541	10.44%
Ilya Petrov	Party of Pensioners	793	5.37%
Roman Pysany	New People	678	4.59%
Total		14,759	100%

==== District 3 ====
Summary of the 18–20 September 2026 Legislative Assembly of Kirov Oblast election in Omutninsky constituency No.3
Candidate	Party	Votes	%
Aleksandr Utkin (incumbent)	United Russia	7,184	52.65%
Irina Laletina	Communist Party	2,515	18.43%
Sergey Shironin	Liberal Democratic Party	1,431	10.49%
Irina Pisnaya	New People	848	6.21%
Nikolay Saltykov	Party of Pensioners	807	5.91%
Ivan Trofimchenkov	Communists of Russia	329	2.41%
Total		13,645	100%

==== District 4 ====
Summary of the 18–20 September 2026 Legislative Assembly of Kirov Oblast election in Belokholunitsky constituency No.4
Candidate	Party	Votes	%
Nikolay Koyev	United Russia	11,153	54.65%
Aleksey Votintsev	Communist Party	2,325	11.39%
Aleksandr Kozlov	Liberal Democratic Party	1,949	9.55%
Igor Skryabin	A Just Russia	1,825	8.94%
Olga Bugrova	New People	1,585	7.77%
Elvira Ovsyannikova	Communists of Russia	1,101	5.39%
Total		20,408	100%

==== District 5 ====
Summary of the 18–20 September 2026 Legislative Assembly of Kirov Oblast election in Bogorodsky constituency No.5
Candidate	Party	Votes	%
Vladimir Shulayev (incumbent)	United Russia	7,273	41.99%
Aleksandra Alminova	New People	2,834	16.36%
Andrey Kazakov	Liberal Democratic Party	2,133	12.32%
Lyubov Maslennikova	Communist Party	2,016	11.64%
Denis Lobanov	A Just Russia	897	5.18%
Tatyana Kalitova	Party of Pensioners	797	4.60%
Galina Baklanova	Communists of Russia	745	4.30%
Total		17,319	100%

==== District 6 ====
Summary of the 18–20 September 2026 Legislative Assembly of Kirov Oblast election in Yuryansky constituency No.6
Candidate	Party	Votes	%
Aleksey Potapenko	United Russia	7,828	43.45%
Roman Rogov	Liberal Democratic Party	2,761	15.32%
Nikita Klyukin	A Just Russia	2,578	14.31%
Mikhail Stets	Communist Party	1,593	8.84%
Yelizaveta Schneider	New People	1,495	8.30%
Zinaida Sidorova	Communists of Russia	1,142	6.34%
Total		18,017	100%

==== District 7 ====
Summary of the 18–20 September 2026 Legislative Assembly of Kirov Oblast election in Slobodskoy constituency No.7
Candidate	Party	Votes	%
Konstantin Smolev	Liberal Democratic Party	5,158	27.81%
Roman Titov (incumbent)	United Russia	5,039	27.17%
Boris Portnykh	New People	2,395	12.91%
Andrey Yelkin	A Just Russia	2,181	11.76%
Valery Turulo	Communist Party	1,457	7.86%
Tatyana Tarasova	Party of Pensioners	790	4.26%
Larisa Leushina	Communists of Russia	789	4.25%
Total		18,546	100%

==== District 8 ====
Summary of the 18–20 September 2026 Legislative Assembly of Kirov Oblast election in Orlovsky constituency No.8
Candidate	Party	Votes	%
Sergey Krutikov	United Russia	6,487	39.07%
Yulia Khudyayeva	A Just Russia	3,433	20.68%
Andrey Norkin	Communist Party	2,400	14.46%
Vladimir Mokhov	Liberal Democratic Party	1,750	10.54%
Yelena Vopilova	Party of Pensioners	1,475	8.88%
Vasily Shemyakov	Communists of Russia	500	3.01%
Total		16,602	100%

==== District 9 ====
Summary of the 18–20 September 2026 Legislative Assembly of Kirov Oblast election in Kotelnichsky constituency No.9
Candidate	Party	Votes	%
Valery Slotin	United Russia	3,929	30.86%
Vladimir Ponaryev	Liberal Democratic Party	3,723	29.24%
Anna Manakova	Communist Party	1,266	9.94%
Ivan Vasilyev	A Just Russia	1,001	7.86%
Yury Churpinov	Communists of Russia	992	7.79%
Ulyana Kiseleva	New People	882	6.93%
Viktoria Zhuykova	Party of Pensioners	409	3.21%
Total		12,733	100%

==== District 10 ====
Summary of the 18–20 September 2026 Legislative Assembly of Kirov Oblast election in Orichevsky constituency No.10
Candidate	Party	Votes	%
Roman Beresnev (incumbent)	United Russia	9,123	54.75%
Denis Monako	Communist Party	1,973	11.84%
Nina Komissarova	A Just Russia	1,716	10.30%
Sergey Shulyatyev	Liberal Democratic Party	1,460	8.76%
Margarita Shamova	New People	1,093	6.56%
Darya Kochergina	Communists of Russia	904	5.43%
Total		16,662	100%

==== District 11 ====
Summary of the 18–20 September 2026 Legislative Assembly of Kirov Oblast election in Nolinsky constituency No.11
Candidate	Party	Votes	%
Nikolay Shabalin (incumbent)	United Russia	8,457	53.36%
Marina Vylegzhanina	Communist Party	2,053	12.95%
Aleksandr Ponaryev	Liberal Democratic Party	1,905	12.02%
Dmitry Arefyev	A Just Russia	860	5.43%
Polina Yushkova	New People	820	5.17%
Svetlana Selezneva	Communists of Russia	613	3.87%
Anastasia Guzhavina	Party of Pensioners	581	3.67%
Total		15,848	100%

==== District 12 ====
Summary of the 18–20 September 2026 Legislative Assembly of Kirov Oblast election in Yaransky constituency No.12
Candidate	Party	Votes	%
Vladimir Loginov	United Russia	9,531	54.39%
Vladimir Khorikov	A Just Russia	2,096	11.96%
Vasily Shastin	Liberal Democratic Party	1,727	9.86%
Nadezhda Nikonova	Communists of Russia	1,651	9.42%
Yevgenia Melnikova	Party of Pensioners	1,045	5.96%
Vyacheslav Tsepelev	New People	1,011	5.77%
Total		17,524	100%

==== District 13 ====
Summary of the 18–20 September 2026 Legislative Assembly of Kirov Oblast election in Sovetsky constituency No.13
Candidate	Party	Votes	%
Sergey Galkin	United Russia	7,906	48.54%
Ivan Kuzminykh	Communist Party	2,725	16.73%
Tamara Lelekova	Liberal Democratic Party	1,440	8.84%
Ivan Glukhikh	New People	1,152	7.07%
Yulia Katayeva	A Just Russia	951	5.84%
Galina Novikova	Communists of Russia	804	4.94%
Alevtina Yelsukova	Party of Pensioners	793	4.87%
Total		16,288	100%

==== District 14 ====
Summary of the 18–20 September 2026 Legislative Assembly of Kirov Oblast election in Urzhumsky constituency No.14
Candidate	Party	Votes	%
Igor Strabykin	United Russia	7,836	47.94%
Yelena Pakhomova	Liberal Democratic Party	2,779	17.00%
Tatyana Simonova	Communists of Russia	2,032	12.43%
Aleksandr Zaytsev	New People	1,625	9.94%
Pavel Koptyayev	A Just Russia	1,484	9.08%
Total		16,344	100%

==== District 15 ====
Summary of the 18–20 September 2026 Legislative Assembly of Kirov Oblast election in Vyatskopolyansky constituency No.15
Candidate	Party	Votes	%
Ravil Nurgaleyev (incumbent)	United Russia	10,964	65.43%
Irina Vekshina	Communist Party	2,820	16.83%
Timofey Sidorov	Liberal Democratic Party	1,285	7.67%
Aleksey Bogomolov	A Just Russia	1,174	7.01%
Total		16,757	100%

==== District 16 ====
Summary of the 18–20 September 2026 Legislative Assembly of Kirov Oblast election in Malmyzhsky constituency No.16
Candidate	Party	Votes	%
Aleksandr Balabanov	New People	6,704	39.15%
Ilgiz Burkhanov (incumbent)	United Russia	5,876	34.32%
Zulfia Salakhova	Communist Party	2,163	12.63%
Vladimir Goncharov	Liberal Democratic Party	1,010	5.90%
Aleksandr Pimenov	A Just Russia	889	5.19%
Total		17,123	100%

==== District 17 ====
Summary of the 18–20 September 2026 Legislative Assembly of Kirov Oblast election in Kirovo-Chepetsky constituency No.17
Candidate	Party	Votes	%
Aleksandr Ivanishin (incumbent)	United Russia	6,804	43.34%
Mikhail Kremlyov	Communist Party	2,415	15.38%
Viktor Savinykh	New People	1,537	9.79%
Ruslan Atakhanov	Liberal Democratic Party	1,524	9.71%
Sergey Mutnykh	A Just Russia	1,343	8.55%
Maria Ardasheva	Communists of Russia	975	6.21%
Dmitry Tiunov	Party of Pensioners	465	2.96%
Total		15,699	100%

==== District 18 ====
Summary of the 18–20 September 2026 Legislative Assembly of Kirov Oblast election in Kirovo-Chepetsky constituency No.18
Candidate	Party	Votes	%
Sergey Zavyalov	United Russia	9,007	45.84%
Denis Goloviznin	Liberal Democratic Party	2,512	12.79%
Aleksey Khamula	Communist Party	1,937	9.86%
Vyacheslav Tsaryuk	A Just Russia	1,927	9.81%
Maria Mikhaylova	New People	1,854	9.44%
Dmitry Shikhov	Communists of Russia	823	4.19%
Aleksandr Kuznetsov	Party of Pensioners	803	4.09%
Total		19,648	100%

==== District 19 ====
Summary of the 18–20 September 2026 Legislative Assembly of Kirov Oblast election in Kirovsky constituency No.19
Candidate	Party	Votes	%
Aleksandr Nikulin	A Just Russia	7,468	44.14%
Ruslan Tsukanov	United Russia	4,685	27.69%
Pavel Gnevashev	Communist Party	1,290	7.63%
Natalia Ashikhmina	Liberal Democratic Party	1,169	6.91%
Ivana Kasyanova	New People	1,043	6.17%
Svetlana Ivanova	Party of Pensioners	427	2.52%
Sergey Nikonov	Communists of Russia	377	2.23%
Total		16,917	100%

==== District 20 ====
Summary of the 18–20 September 2026 Legislative Assembly of Kirov Oblast election in Kirovsky constituency No.20
Candidate	Party	Votes	%
Sogomon Arakelyan (incumbent)	United Russia	4,971	37.27%
Olga Tyrykina	Liberal Democratic Party	2,738	20.53%
Vera Kalashnikova	Communist Party	1,703	12.77%
Yulia Oborina	New People	1,506	11.29%
Konstantin Parfenov	A Just Russia	941	7.05%
Valentina Vinogradova	Communists of Russia	513	3.85%
Lyudmila Fedyachkina	Party of Pensioners	509	3.82%
Total		13,339	100%

==== District 21 ====
Summary of the 18–20 September 2026 Legislative Assembly of Kirov Oblast election in Kirovsky constituency No.21
Candidate	Party	Votes	%
Nikita Solomennikov (incumbent)	United Russia	5,895	36.99%
Anastasia Vorobyova	Communist Party	2,766	17.36%
Aleksey Koykov	New People	2,189	13.74%
Larisa Chernyadyeva	Liberal Democratic Party	2,084	13.08%
Veronika Chekalkina	A Just Russia	987	6.19%
Yevgenia Akhrimenko	Communists of Russia	763	4.79%
Mikhail Sharapov	Party of Pensioners	705	4.42%
Total		15,937	100%

==== District 22 ====
Summary of the 18–20 September 2026 Legislative Assembly of Kirov Oblast election in Kirovsky constituency No.22
Candidate	Party	Votes	%
Irina Morozova (incumbent)	United Russia	4,832	32.29%
Aleksandr Kiselyov	Communist Party	2,732	18.26%
Yevgeny Maryinsky	New People	2,148	14.35%
Oleg Lodygin	Liberal Democratic Party	2,108	14.09%
Yekaterina Kolotova	A Just Russia	1,963	13.12%
Denis Maryin	Communists of Russia	594	3.97%
Total		14,964	100%

==== District 23 ====
Summary of the 18–20 September 2026 Legislative Assembly of Kirov Oblast election in Kirovsky constituency No.23
Candidate	Party	Votes	%
Anna Alminova	New People	3,347	25.43%
Yeremey Bushmelev	United Russia	2,771	21.05%
Olga Borisova (incumbent)	Liberal Democratic Party	2,312	17.57%
Tatyana Platunova (incumbent)	A Just Russia	1,861	14.14%
Dmitry Vokhmyanin	Communist Party	1,631	12.39%
Yulia Belova	Party of Pensioners	549	4.17%
Valeria Kostyuk	Communists of Russia	267	2.03%
Total		13,162	100%

==== District 24 ====
Summary of the 18–20 September 2026 Legislative Assembly of Kirov Oblast election in Kirovsky constituency No.24
Candidate	Party	Votes	%
Danil Zonov	United Russia	4,453	29.13%
Aleksandr Boyarintsev	Communist Party	2,382	15.58%
Oleg Koshkin	New People	2,260	14.78%
Artyom Kosnyrev	A Just Russia	1,943	12.71%
Rudolf Koshurnikov	Liberal Democratic Party	1,507	9.86%
Galina Metelyova	Party of Pensioners	1,162	7.60%
Sergey Bagayev	Communists of Russia	1,048	6.85%
Total		15,289	100%

==== District 25 ====
The election in the district was cancelled and postponed after some ballots had been printed without Ivan Piskunov (RPPSS) and Eduard Plastin (CPRF). All votes cast were declared void.

Summary of the 18–20 September 2026 Legislative Assembly of Kirov Oblast election in Kirovsky constituency No.25
Candidate	Party	Votes	%
Georgy Barminov	United Russia	0	0.00%
Anastasia Dolgikh	Communists of Russia	0	0.00%
Vadim Gilyazov	New People	0	0.00%
Natalya Kalinina	Liberal Democratic Party	0	0.00%
Ivan Piskunov	Party of Pensioners	0	0.00%
Eduard Plastin	Communist Party	0	0.00%
Tatyana Yerdyakova (incumbent)	A Just Russia	0	0.00%
Total		4,630	100%

==== District 26 ====
Summary of the 18–20 September 2026 Legislative Assembly of Kirov Oblast election in Kirovsky constituency No.26
Candidate	Party	Votes	%
Andrey Chernov	United Russia	4,839	33.34%
Yekaterina Mamayeva	New People	2,716	18.71%
Viktor Kozlov	Liberal Democratic Party	2,205	15.19%
Mikhail Papayev	Communist Party	2,025	13.95%
Nina Makarova	Party of Pensioners	1,278	8.80%
Denis Katayev	Communists of Russia	972	6.70%
Total		14,516	100%

==== District 27 ====
Summary of the 18–20 September 2026 Legislative Assembly of Kirov Oblast election in Kirovsky constituency No.27
Candidate	Party	Votes	%
Konstantin Pomaskin	United Russia	4,909	31.24%
Aleksey Kuzmin	Liberal Democratic Party	3,410	21.70%
Leisana Davletshina	New People	2,585	16.45%
Vadim Derbenev	Communist Party	2,433	15.48%
Veronika Permyakova	Party of Pensioners	1,077	6.85%
Nikita Kuklin	Communists of Russia	714	4.54%
Total		15,712	100%

==== District 28 ====
Summary of the 18–20 September 2026 Legislative Assembly of Kirov Oblast election in Kirovsky constituency No.28
Candidate	Party	Votes	%
Yaroslav Shulakov	United Russia	5,494	36.68%
Anna Vedernikova	New People	2,362	15.77%
Sergey Kalinin	Liberal Democratic Party	2,216	14.80%
Aleksandr Vorozhtsov	Communist Party	2,054	13.71%
Igor Zagoskin	A Just Russia	1,118	7.46%
Lyubov Mabatova	Party of Pensioners	606	4.05%
Dmitry Igumnov	Communists of Russia	593	3.96%
Total		14,977	100%

==== District 29 ====
Summary of the 18–20 September 2026 Legislative Assembly of Kirov Oblast election in Kirovsky constituency No.29
Candidate	Party	Votes	%
Ilya Lebedev	United Russia	5,555	37.08%
Albert Bikalyuk (incumbent)	Communist Party	2,548	17.01%
Pavel Sumachev	Liberal Democratic Party	2,415	16.12%
Kirill Pisny	New People	1,784	11.91%
Sergey Brandobovsky	A Just Russia	1,575	10.51%
Vladimir Badmayev	Communists of Russia	511	3.41%
Total		14,980	100%

==== District 30 ====
Summary of the 18–20 September 2026 Legislative Assembly of Kirov Oblast election in Kirovsky constituency No.30
Candidate	Party	Votes	%
Vadim Ralnikov	United Russia	4,955	34.48%
Sergey Vozhegov	Communist Party	2,352	16.37%
Yelena Voronina	New People	2,086	14.51%
Maksim Lisovsky	Liberal Democratic Party	2,056	14.31%
Mikhail Bokov	A Just Russia	1,065	7.41%
Nadezhda Ponomareva	Party of Pensioners	786	5.47%
Aleksey Iovlev	Communists of Russia	531	3.69%
Total		14,372	100%

=== Members ===
Incumbent deputies are highlighted with bold, elected members who declined to take a seat are marked with ~~strikethrough~~.

Constituency
No.	Member	Party
1	Andrey Mityashin	United Russia
2	Andrey Makarov	United Russia
3	Aleksandr Utkin	United Russia
4	Nikolay Koyev	United Russia
5	Vladimir Shulayev	United Russia
6	Aleksey Potapenko	United Russia
7	Konstantin Smolev	Liberal Democratic Party
8	Sergey Krutikov	United Russia
9	Valery Slotin	United Russia
10	Roman Beresnev	United Russia
11	Nikolay Shabalin	United Russia
12	Vladimir Loginov	United Russia
13	Sergey Galkin	United Russia
14	Igor Strabykin	United Russia
15	Ravil Nurgaleyev	United Russia
16	Aleksandr Balabanov	New People
17	Aleksandr Ivanishin	United Russia
18	Sergey Zavyalov	United Russia
19	Aleksandr Nikulin	A Just Russia
20	Sogomon Arakelyan	United Russia
21	Nikita Solomennikov	United Russia
22	Irina Morozova	United Russia
23	Anna Alminova	New People
24	Danil Zonov	United Russia
25	vacant	
26	Andrey Chernov	United Russia
27	Konstantin Pomaskin	United Russia
28	Yaroslav Shulakov	United Russia
29	Ilya Lebedev	United Russia
30	Vadim Ralnikov	United Russia

Party lists
Member	Party
~~Aleksandr Sokolov~~	United Russia
Anastasia Bortsova	United Russia
Vyacheslav Timchenko	United Russia
Lyudmila Nagovitsyna	United Russia
Oleg Valenchuk	United Russia
Irina Mikerina	United Russia
Evgeny Rylov	United Russia
~~Leonid Slutsky~~	Liberal Democratic Party
Pavel Dorofeyev	Liberal Democratic Party
Olga Tyrykina	Liberal Democratic Party
~~Aleksandr Kozlov~~	Liberal Democratic Party
~~Denis Pyrlog~~	Liberal Democratic Party
Vladimir Ponaryev	Liberal Democratic Party
Sergey Mamayev	Communist Party
Yury Vylegzhanin	Communist Party
Andrey Iglin	New People
Kirill Pisny	New People
Yekaterina Kolotova	A Just Russia
Aleksandr Markov	Party of Pensioners

== See also ==
- 2026 Russian regional elections
