= Governor of Tomsk Oblast =

Highest-ranking official in Tomsk Oblast, Russia

- Губернатор Томской области
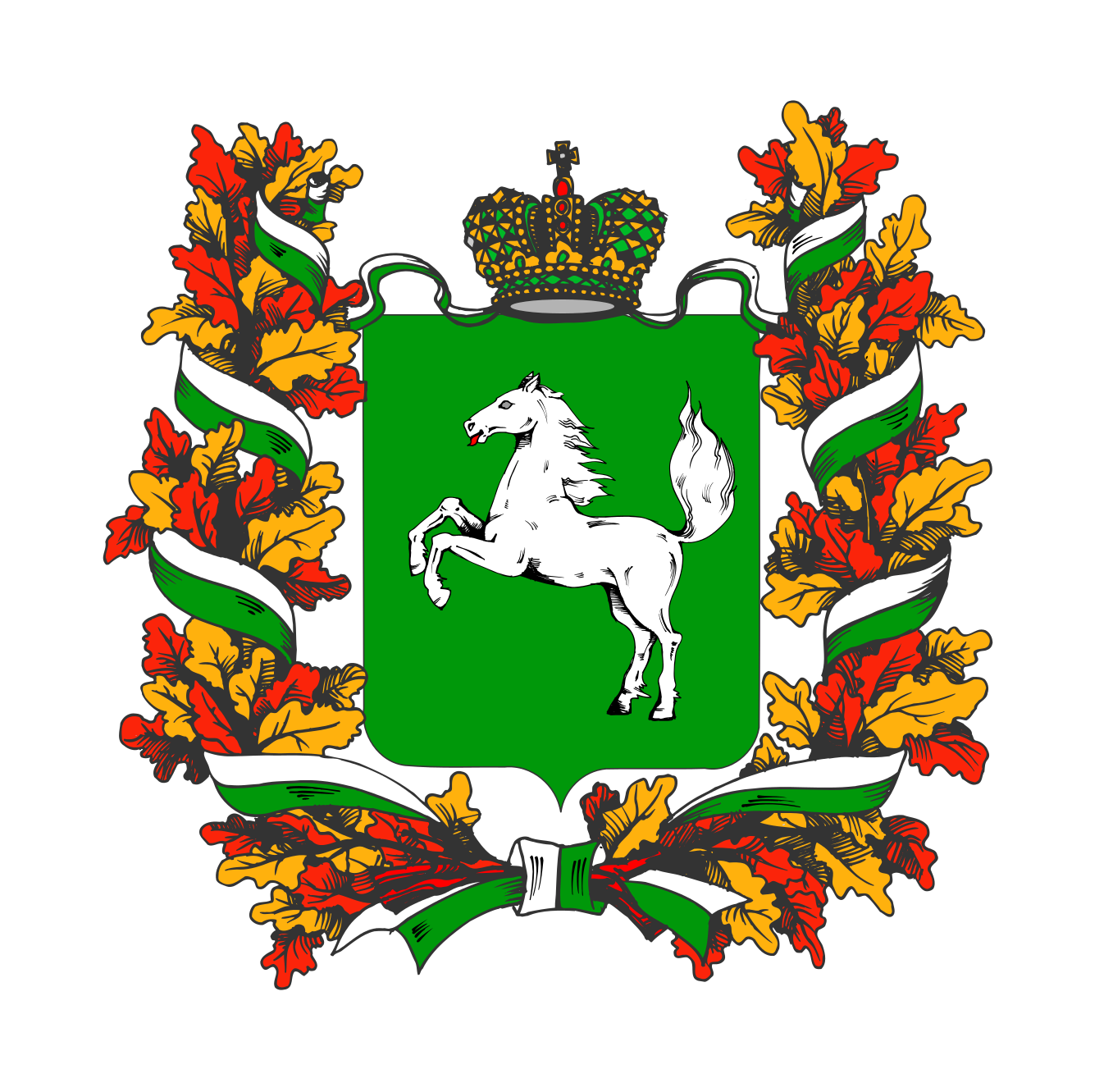
- Standard of the governor of Tomsk Oblast

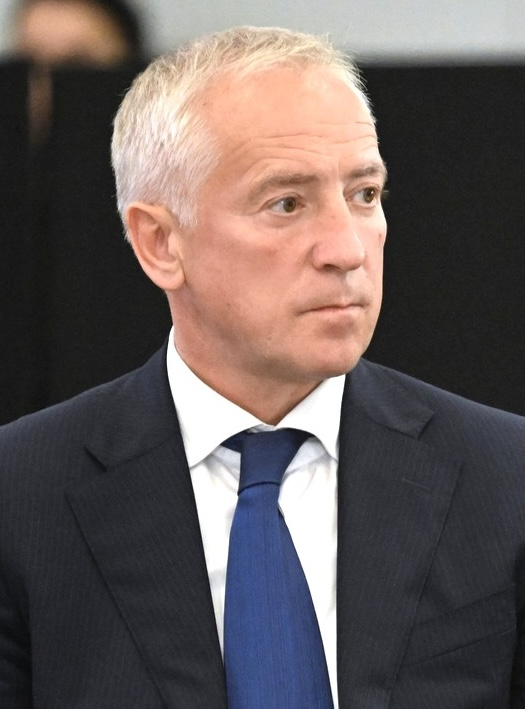
- Incumbent; Vladimir Mazur since 22 September 2022
- Seat: Tomsk
- Appointer: Popular vote
- Term length: Five years
- Constituting instrument: Charter of Tomsk Oblast, Section 5, Chapter 23
- Inaugural holder: Viktor Kress
- Website: en.tomsk.gov.ru

The Governor of Tomsk Oblast (Russian: Губернатор Томской области) is the highest official and the head of the executive power of Tomsk Oblast in Russia.

The term of the office is five years.

== List of governors ==
No.	Portrait	Name	Tenure	Time in office	Party	Election
1		Viktor Kress (born 1948)	20 October 1991 – 18 September 1999 (Note: In June 1999, Kress announced his intention to resign in order to hold a snap gubernatorial election. His resignation took effect on 18 September, one day before the vote.) (resigned)	7 years, 333 days	Independent	Appointed 1995
—		Vladimir Ponomarenko (born 1943)	18 September 1999 – 25 September 1999 (successor took office)	7 days	Independent	Acting
(1)		Viktor Kress (born 1948)	25 September 1999 – 17 March 2012 (retired)	12 years, 174 days (Note: Total: 20 years, 142 days.)	Independent → United Russia	1999; 2003; 2007 (Note: Appointed by the president of Russia with the consent of the State Duma of Tomsk Oblast.)
2		Sergey Zhvachkin (born 1957)	17 March 2012 – 21 February 2017 (resigned)	10 years, 54 days	United Russia	2012 (Note: Appointed by the president of Russia with the consent of the Legislative Duma of Tomsk Oblast.)
—		Sergey Zhvachkin (born 1957)	21 February 2017 – 18 September 2017	10 years, 54 days	United Russia	Acting
(2)		Sergey Zhvachkin (born 1957)	18 September 2017 – 10 May 2022 (resigned)	10 years, 54 days	United Russia	2017
—		Vladimir Mazur (born 1966)	10 May 2022 – 22 September 2022	4 years, 165 days	United Russia	Acting
3		Vladimir Mazur (born 1966)	22 September 2022 – present	4 years, 165 days	United Russia	2022
