= State Duma (disambiguation) =

State Duma may refer to:

- State Duma, the lower house of the Federal Assembly of Russia
- State Duma (Russian Empire), the lower house of the Russian Imperial parliament
- State Duma of Stavropol Krai, Russian regional parliament
- State Duma of Astrakhan Oblast, Russian regional parliament
- Legislative Duma of Tomsk Oblast, formerly State Duma of Tomsk Oblast, Russian regional parliament
- State Duma of Yaroslavl Oblast, Russian regional parliament
- State Duma of Yamalo-Nenets Autonomous Okrug, Russian regional parliament
