= Eppel =

Eppel is a surname. Notable people with the surname include:

- Asar Eppel (1935–2012), Russian writer and translator
- John Eppel (born 1947), Zimbabwean writer
- Márton Eppel (born 1991), Hungarian footballer
