= Aleksey Kuznetsov (politician) =

Russian politician

- Алексей Кузнецов

Governor of Kirov Oblast (acting)
- In office 27 June 2016 – 28 July 2016
- Preceded by: Nikita Belykh
- Succeeded by: Igor Vasilyev

Deputy Chairman of the Government of the Kirov Oblast
- In office 1 January 2012 – 15 September 2016

Personal details
- Born: Aleksey Borisovich Kuznetsov; 25 August 1971 (age 54) Gorky, Soviet Union
- Party: United Russia

Aleksey Borisovich Kuznetsov (Russian: Алексей Борисович Кузнецов; born on 25 August 1971), is a Russian statesman and manager, who is the First Deputy Director of the Industrial Development Fund since 2020.

He had served as the acting governor of Kirov Oblast in 2016, and had served as the vice governor of the region from 2012 to 2016.

== Biography ==
Aleksey Kuznetsov was born in Gorky (Nizhny Novgorod) on 25 August 1971.

From 1994 to 2004, he worked in the Volgo-Vyatka bank of Sberbank of Russia as he held the positions of engineer, and then the deputy director of the department of informatics and automation of banking operations.

From 2004 to 2005, he became the Head of the Banking Technologies Department of the Volgo-Vyatka Bank of Sberbank of Russia.

From 2005 to 2008, he became Director of the Internal Control Department for the Volgo-Vyatka Bank of Sberbank of Russia.

From 2008n to 2012, he became the Deputy Chairman of the Board of Volgo-Vyatskiy Bank, as was as the Manager of Kirov Branch No. 8612 of Sberbank of Russia.

On 1 January 2012, Kuznetsov became the Deputy Chairman of the Government of the Kirov Oblast.

On 27 June 2016, Kuznetsov became the acting governor of Kirov Oblast, after the previous governor, Nikita Belykh, was arrested under suspicion of bribery. He held that position for a month, before being officially replaced by Igor Vasilyev, on 28 July.

Since January 2017, he is the Senior Managing Director of UEC JSC (Sberbank Group).

Since February 2018, he is the managing director of the Industry Development Fund. In September 2019, he was promoted to the deputy director of the Industry Development Fund. Since March 2020, he was promoted to the First Deputy Director of the Industry Development Fund.
