= Governor of Kirov Oblast =

Highest-ranking official in Kirov Oblast, Russia

- Coat of arms of Kirov Oblast

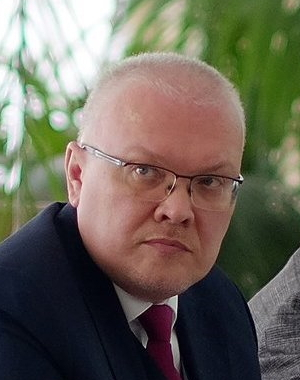
- Incumbent; Aleksandr Sokolov since 23 September 2022
- Residence: Kirov
- Term length: 5 years
- Inaugural holder: Vasily Desyatnikov
- Formation: 1991
- Website: kirovreg.ru

The Governor of Kirov Oblast (Russian: Губернатор Кировской области) is the governor of Kirov Oblast, a federal subject of Russia.

The title of Governor is given to the highest-ranking official and head of administration of the government of Kirov Oblast.

Aleksandr Sokolov became active governor on the 10 of May 2022 and assumed office on the 23 of September 2022, becoming the 6th Governor of the Kirov Oblast. Aleksandr Sokolov is also a member of the United Russia party.

== List of officeholders ==
No.	Portrait	Governor	Tenure	Time in office	Party	Election
1		Vasily Desyatnikov (1942–2023)	11 December 1991 – 1 November 1996 (lost election)	4 years, 326 days	Independent	Appointed
2		Vladimir Sergeyenkov (1938–2014)	1 November 1996 – 18 January 2004 (term-limited)	7 years, 78 days	Independent	1996; 2000
3		Nikolay Shaklein (1943–2023)	14 January 2004 – 14 January 2009 (was not renominated)	5 years, 0 days	Independent → United Russia	2003
4		Nikita Belykh (born 1975)	15 January 2009 – 14 January 2014 (term end)	7 years, 196 days	Independent	2008 (Note: Appointed by the president of Russia with the consent of the Legislative Assembly of Kirov Oblast.)
—		Nikita Belykh (born 1975)	14 January 2014 – 23 September 2014	7 years, 196 days	Independent	Acting
(4)		Nikita Belykh (born 1975)	23 September 2014 – 28 July 2016 (removed)	7 years, 196 days	Independent	2014
—		Aleksey Kuznetsov (born 1971)	27 June 2016 – 28 July 2016	31 days	United Russia	Acting for Belykh
—		Igor Vasilyev (born 1961)	28 July 2016 – 19 September 2017	5 years, 286 days	United Russia	Acting
5		Igor Vasilyev (born 1961)	19 September 2017 – 10 May 2022 (resigned)	5 years, 286 days	United Russia	2017
—		Aleksandr Sokolov (born 1970)	10 May 2022 – 23 September 2022	4 years, 120 days	United Russia	Acting
6		Aleksandr Sokolov (born 1970)	23 September 2022 – present	4 years, 120 days	United Russia	2022
