= Nikolay Shaklein =

Russian politician (1943–2023)

- Николай Шаклеин
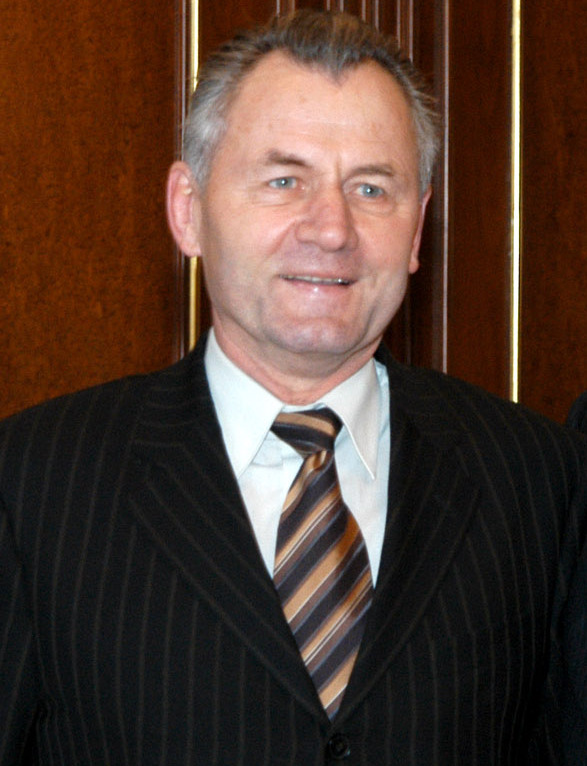
- Shaklein in 2005

Senator from Kirov Oblast
- In office 26 March 2009 – 19 December 2011
- Preceded by: Alexey Klishin
- Succeeded by: Svetlana Zhurova

3rd Governor of Kirov Oblast
- In office 14 January 2004 – 14 January 2009
- Preceded by: Vladimir Sergeyenkov
- Succeeded by: Nikita Belykh

Deputy Prosecutor General of Russia
- In office 27 April 1991 – 15 October 1993
- Prosecutor: Valentin Stepankov

Personal details
- Born: 20 December 1943 Korshunikha, Kirov Oblast, Russian SFSR, Soviet Union
- Died: 16 May 2023 (aged 79) Kirov, Kirov Oblast, Russia
- Education: Perm State University

Nikolay Ivanovich Shaklein (Russian: Николай Иванович Шаклеин; 20 December 1943 – 16 May 2023) was a Russian politician who served as governor of Kirov Oblast in Russia. He rose in the ranks of the state prosecution service, becoming the deputy general prosecutor of the Russian Federation by 1999.

Shaklein was a deputy of the State Duma. He was elected governor in a run-off on 21 December 2003, and was sworn in on 14 January 2004. Nikita Belykh succeeded him in 2008.

Shaklein died on 16 May 2023, at the age of 79.

== Biography ==
Shaklein was born on 20 December 1943 in the village of Korshunikha, Kirov Oblast. In 1959, at the age of 16 he started working as a turner and fitter at the Kirov plant. In 1973 he graduated from the Law Faculty of Perm State University.

From 1969 he worked as a legal adviser at the plant Mayak in Kirov. From 1971 he worked in the Kirov Prosecutor's Office as assistant prosecutor, in 1978 he was promoted to prosecutor of the Oktyabrsky District of Kirov. From August 1981, he worked as an instructor of the Kirov Regional Committee of the CPSU, then as deputy prosecutor of the Kirov Oblast.

In May 1986, he was appointed prosecutor of the Kirov oblast. In September 1987, he was transferred to Moscow as an instructor of administrative bodies of the CPSU Central Committee. In 1991-1993 he worked as Deputy Prosecutor-General of the Russian Federation under Valentin Stepankov. After that he worked as Deputy Head of the Kirov Oblast Administration.

On 23 March 1997, he was elected to the 2nd State Duma. Worked in the State Duma Committee on Legislation and Judicial and Legal Reform. He was a member of the Regions of Russia deputy group. On 19 December 1999 he was elected to the 3rd State Duma. Worked as deputy chairman of the State Duma Committee on Legislation.

From 2004 to 2009 served as the Governor of Kirov Oblast.

From 16 March to 25 September 2007 he was a member of the Presidium of the State Council of the Russian Federation.

From 2009 to 2011 — member of the Federation Council representing Kirov oblast.

From 16 January 2012 to May 2019 — Director of the Volgo-Vyatsky branch of the Kutafin Moscow State Law University in Kirov. Advisor to the rector of the Kutafin University since 2019.

Shaklein died after a long illness on 16 May 2023. He is buried at the Novomakarievsky cemetery of Kirov.
