= 2012 Nozhay-Yurtovsky District clashes =

Skirmish between Russian forces and Islamist extremists in Chechnya

- Part of the Insurgency in the North Caucasus
- Location of Nozhay-Yurtovsky District on the map of the Chechen Republic
Date	February 13–17, 2012
Location	Nozhay-Yurtovsky District, Chechnya (Russia)
Result	(Russia) Russian Victory

Belligerents
Russia	Caucasus Emirate

Commanders and leaders
Ramzan Kadyrov	Magarbi Timiraliyev †

Casualties and losses
17 killed and 24 wounded (government claim)	7 killed (government claim)

The 2012 Nozhay-Yurtovsky District clashes involving Russian Interior Ministry special forces supported by heavy weapons and military aircraft and Islamist militants occurred between February 13 and 17, 2012, reportedly leaving at least 24 people dead on both sides. The Nozhay-Yurtovsky District is a part of the Russian republic of Chechnya bordering Dagestan. According to the Chechen president Ramzan Kadyrov, mountains were being cleared of rebels because of a planned construction of a tourist complex in the area.

== Results ==
Initially, Kadyrov claimed that a group of 20 fighters led by Magarbi Timiraliyev ("Abudar") have been destroyed in a special operation, including 13 killed "earlier", and that 13 government troops were killed and 20 injured. However, in an official report for Russian president Dmitry Medvedev (as cited by the state agency ITAR-TASS), Russia's interior minister Rashid Nurgaliyev said that 17 troops have been killed and 24 wounded, and there are only seven confirmed killed members of an armed group; Nurgaliyev also said that the government forces had been ambushed.

According to unofficial Russian sources, at least 21 special policemen were killed and 36 injured while "completely" destroying Timiraliyev's armed group of an unreported size (presumably around seven members). There is also actually no information about the fate of Timiraliyev himself. Kavkazcenter confirmed five rebel deaths, citing the number of bodies shown on TV.
