= Vyacheslav Timchenko (politician) =

Russian politician (born 1955)

- Вячеслав Тимченко
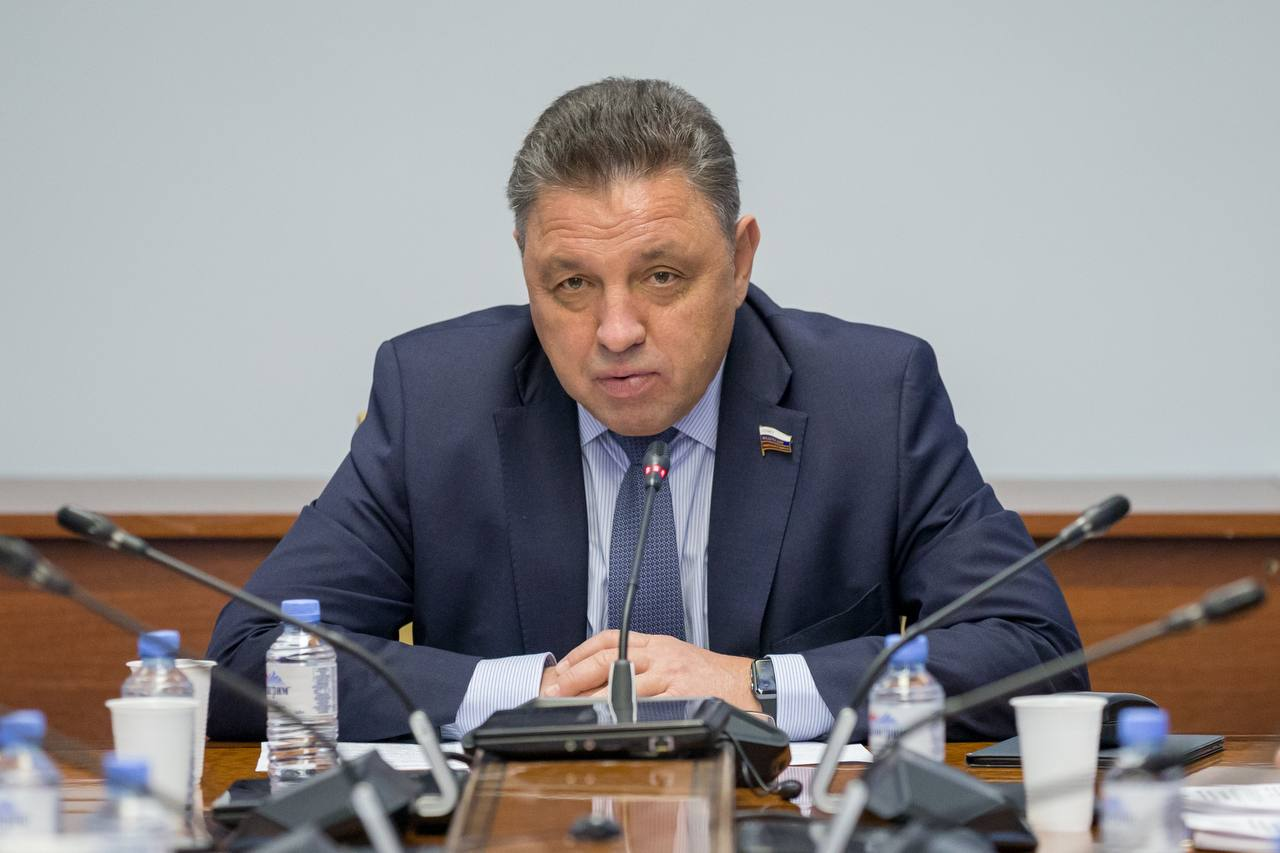
- Timchenko in 2023

Senator from Kirov Oblast on legislative authority
- Incumbent
- Assumed office 6 October 2016
- Preceded by: Oleg Kazakovtsev

Senator from Kirov Oblast on legislative authority
- In office 24 September 2014 – September 2016
- Preceded by: Yury Isupov
- Succeeded by: Oleg Kazakovtsev

Member of the State Duma
- In office 2003 – 24 September 2014

Personal details
- Born: Vyacheslav Stepanovich Timchenko; 20 November 1955 (age 70) Novoshakhtinsk, Rostov Oblast, Russian Soviet Federative Socialist Republic, Soviet Union
- Party: United Russia
- Education: South Russian State Polytechnic University

Vyacheslav Stepanovich Timchenko (Russian: Вячеслав Степанович Тимченко; born 20 November 1955) is a Russian politician serving as a senator from Kirov Oblast since 2014, currently serving on legislative authority as of 2016.

He also served as member of the State Duma from 2003 to 2014.

== Career ==
Vyacheslav Timchenko was born on 20 November 1955 in Novoshakhtinsk, Rostov Oblast. In 1978, he graduated from the South Russian State Polytechnic University. Afterward, he worked as design engineer of the department of non-standard equipment of the Kolomna Locomotive Works. From 1981 to 1983, he served in the Soviet Armed Forces. In July 1985, Timchenko was appointed for a position at the Central Committee of the Komsomol. I

In 2003, Timchenko was elected a member of parliament, a deputy of the State Duma. He was reelected in December 2007.

In 2008, he was the Chairman of the All-Russian Council of Local Self-Government. On 4 December 2011, Timchenko got re-elected as deputy of the 6th State Duma. Since 2014, he has served as the senator from Kirov Oblast.

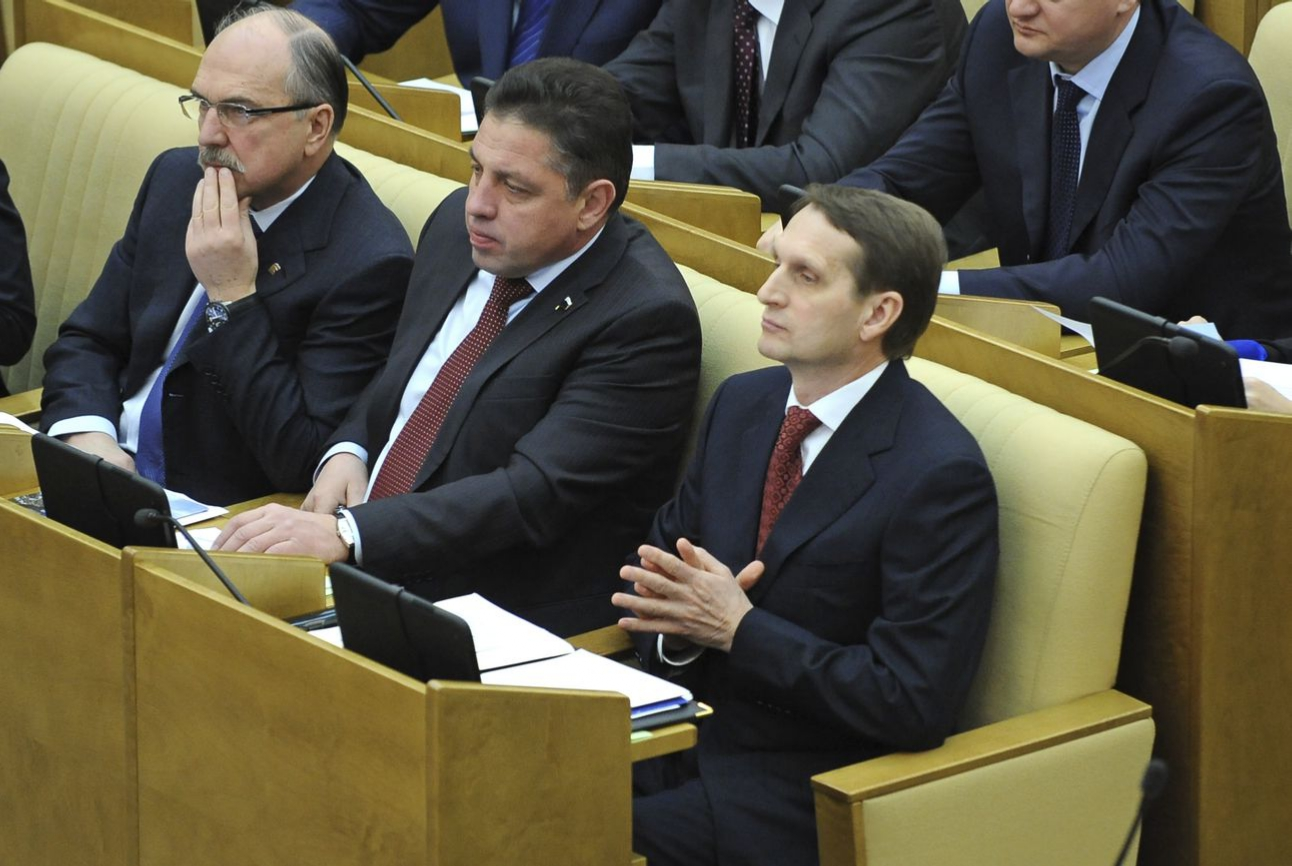
Timchenko (center) in 2011

== Sanctions ==
Vyacheslav Timchenko is under personal sanctions introduced by the European Union, the United Kingdom, the United States, Canada, Switzerland, Australia, Ukraine, New Zealand, for ratifying the decisions of the "Treaty of Friendship, Cooperation and Mutual Assistance between the Russian Federation and the Donetsk People's Republic and between the Russian Federation and the Luhansk People's Republic" and providing political and economic support for Russia's annexation of Ukrainian territories.
