= Sergey Solnechnikov =

Russian military officer (1980–2012)

- Born: 19 August 1980; Potsdam, GDR
- Died: 28 March 2012 (aged 31); Belogorsky District, Amur Oblast
- Military career
- Allegiance: Russia
- Service years: 1997–2012
- Rank: Major
- Unit: 54th command brigade
- Commands: signal battalion
- Awards: Hero of the Russian Federation

Sergey Alexandrovich Solnechnikov (Russian: Серге́й Александрович Солнечников, 19 August 1980 – 28 March 2012) was a Russian military officer, who at the cost of his own life saved his subordinates covering a grenade. During training exercises on March 28, 2012 at a military base near the town of Belogorsk, Major Solnechnikov pushed a soldier away from an unsuccessfully thrown grenade and threw himself over it after it bounced back into the trench they were in with dozens of soldiers standing nearby. Solnechnikov received serious injuries and died. He was honored as a Hero of the Russian Federation, posthumously.

== See also ==
- List of Heroes of the Russian Federation
