= Vladimir Mazur =

Russian politician

- Владимир Мазур
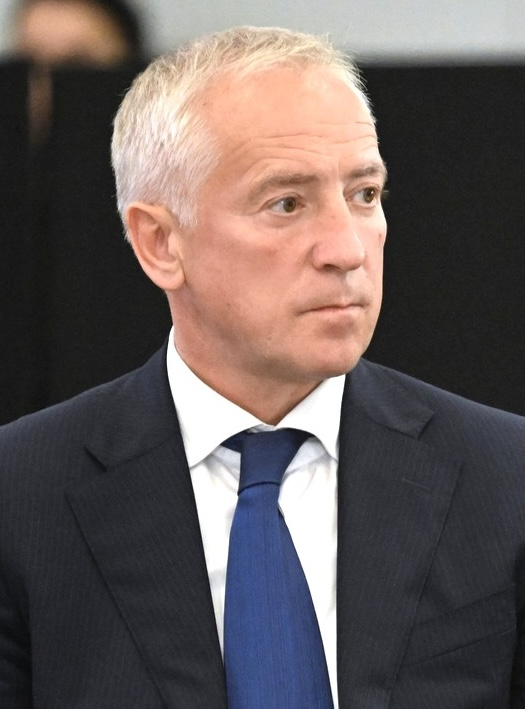
- Mazur in 2023

3rd Governor of Tomsk Oblast
- Incumbent
- Assumed office 22 September 2022
- Preceded by: Sergey Zhvachkin

First Deputy Governor of Kaluga Oblast
- In office 23 December 2019 – 1 June 2020
- Preceded by: Dmitry Denisov

First Deputy Governor of Kaluga Oblast
- In office 28 May 2019 – 23 December 2019

Head of Administration of Tobolsk
- In office 28 May 2019 – 23 December 2019
- Preceded by: Ivan Olenberg
- Succeeded by: Maksim Afanasyev

Personal details
- Born: 19 June 1966 (age 60) Krutolozhnoye, Pervomaysky District, Tomsk Oblast, RSFSR, Soviet Union
- Party: United Russia (since 2011)
- Other political affiliations: Russian Party of Life (before 2006)

Vladimir Vladimirovich Mazur (Russian: Владимир Владимирович Мазур; born 19 June 1966) is a Russian statesman, who is currently serving as the 3rd governor of Tomsk Oblast in since 22 September 2022.

Mazur was born in 1966 in Krutolozhnoye, Pervomaysky District, Tomsk Oblast. In 1992 he graduated from Tomsk State University. He worked as a lawyer in various enterprises of Tomsk, Kemerovo and Moscow.

From 2004 to 2007 Vladimir Mazur served as deputy mayor of Tomsk for information policy, chairman of the public relations committee of the city administration. Since July 2011 he was deputy governor of Tyumen Oblast for investment policy, ecology and subsoil use. From October 2012 to April 2019 he served as a city manager in Tobolsk. From May 2019 to June 2020 he served as deputy governor of Kaluga Oblast.

Since June 2020, Mazur has been deputy head of the president's office for domestic policy within the Presidential Administration of Russia. On 10 May 2022 he was appointed acting governor of his home region, Tomsk Oblast, after Sergey Zhvachkin resigned from the post. Mazur is a member of Vladimir Putin's United Russia party and is expected to run instead of Zhvachkin in an upcoming election in September 2022.

On 11 September 2022, Mazur was elected the governor of Tomsk Oblast with 84,94% of the votes. In September 22, he was inaugurated.

In October of the same year, Mazur supported the idea to abolish direct mayoral elections in the region.

On 1 December 2022, he headed the regional branch of United Russia Party.

Mazur is married. He has five children.

According to Mazur's tax declaration, in 2021, his total income was 5,798,707 rubles. His also owned a 2010 Jaguar XJ and 653,000 rubles on his bank accounts. His wife earned 724,000 rubles in the same year. Yet, she also had about 9.5 million rubles in her accounts. Moreover, Mazur's wife owned more than 160,000 common shares of Inter RAO, Lukoil, Novolipetsk Metallurgical Combinate, and Sberbank. Her assets also included over 2500 depositary receipts issued by BNY Mellon for Etalon Group, Ozon Holding and X5 Retail. The total amount of these assets was over one million rubles.
