= 2017 Kirov Oblast gubernatorial election =

- 10 September 2017
- Turnout: 30.37%
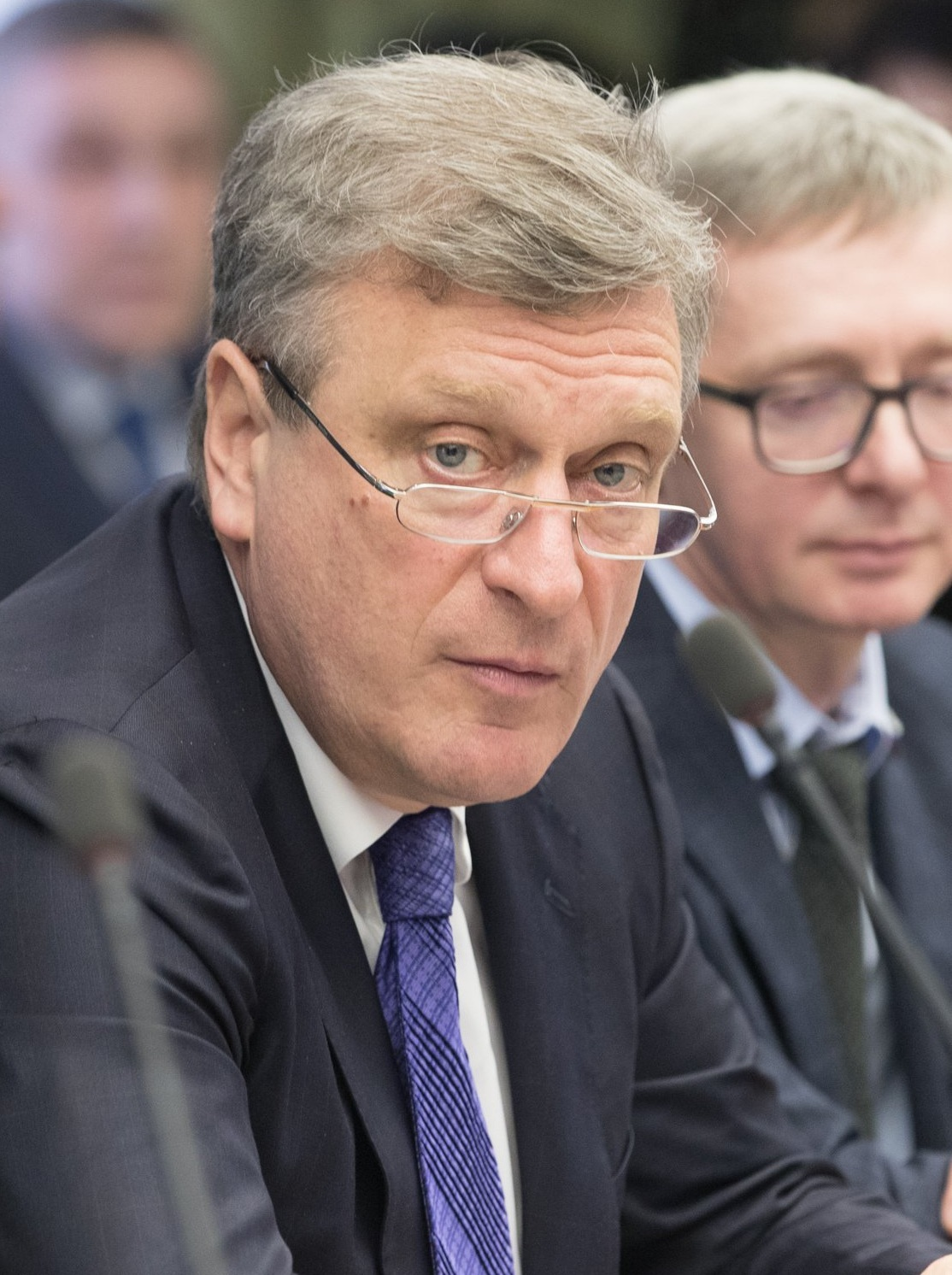

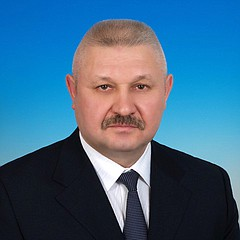
Nominee	Igor Vasilyev	Sergey Mamayev
Party	United Russia	CPRF
Popular vote	209,402	62,132
Percentage	64.03%	18.99%
- Election result by district
Acting Governor before election
Igor Vasilyev
United Russia
Elected Governor
Igor Vasilyev
United Russia

Snap gubernatorial election was held in Kirov Oblast on 10 September 2017 as part of the 2017 Russian regional elections. Acting governor Igor Vasilyev was elected for a full term in office.

== Background ==
The previous election in 2014 was won by Nikita Belykh, who led the region since 2009 as appointed governor. His second term was due to expire in September 2019.

On 24 June 2016 Nikita Belykh was arrested in Moscow at reception of a bribe. On 25 June Investigative Committee of Russia has charged Belykh with receiving a bribe in especially large size. On the same day, the Basmanny District Court of Moscow, he was arrested for two months. After his arrest, the duties of the governor of the Kirov region was performed by his deputy Alexey Kuznetsov.

July 28, 2016, Russian president Vladimir Putin dismissed Nikita Belykh from the post of Governor of the Kirov region with the formulation "in connection with loss of trust". Acting governor until the election appointed Igor Vasilyev.

== Candidates ==
Candidates on the ballot:

Candidate	Party	Office
Nikolay Barsukov; Born 1975 (age 42)	Communists of Russia	Member of Yuryansky District Duma
Igor Vasilyev; Born 1961 (age 56)	United Russia	Incumbent acting Governor
Sergey Mamayev; Born 1958 (age 59)	Communist Party	Assistant to the Member of the State Duma
Kirill Cherkasov; Born 1967 (age 50)	Liberal Democratic Party	Member of the State Duma

== Opinion polls ==
Date	Poll source	Vasilyev	Mamayev	Cherkasov	Barsukov	Undecided	Abstention	Spoil the Ballot
10-20 August 2017	WCIOM	49%	6%	5%	2%	27%	9%	1%
14 September 2014	election result	—	15.99%	9.92%	—	—	—	1.56%

== Result ==
Candidate	Party	Votes	%
Igor Vasilyev	United Russia	209,402	64.03%
Sergey Mamayev	Communist Party	62,132	18.99%
Kirill Cherkasov	Liberal Democratic Party	32,814	10.03%
Nikolay Barsukov	Communists of Russia	13,956	4.27%
Invalid ballots		8,711	2.66%
Total		327,015	100%
Registered voters/turnout		1,076,750	30.37%

== See also ==
- 2017 Russian gubernatorial elections
