= Asar Eppel =

Russian writer and translator (1935–2012)

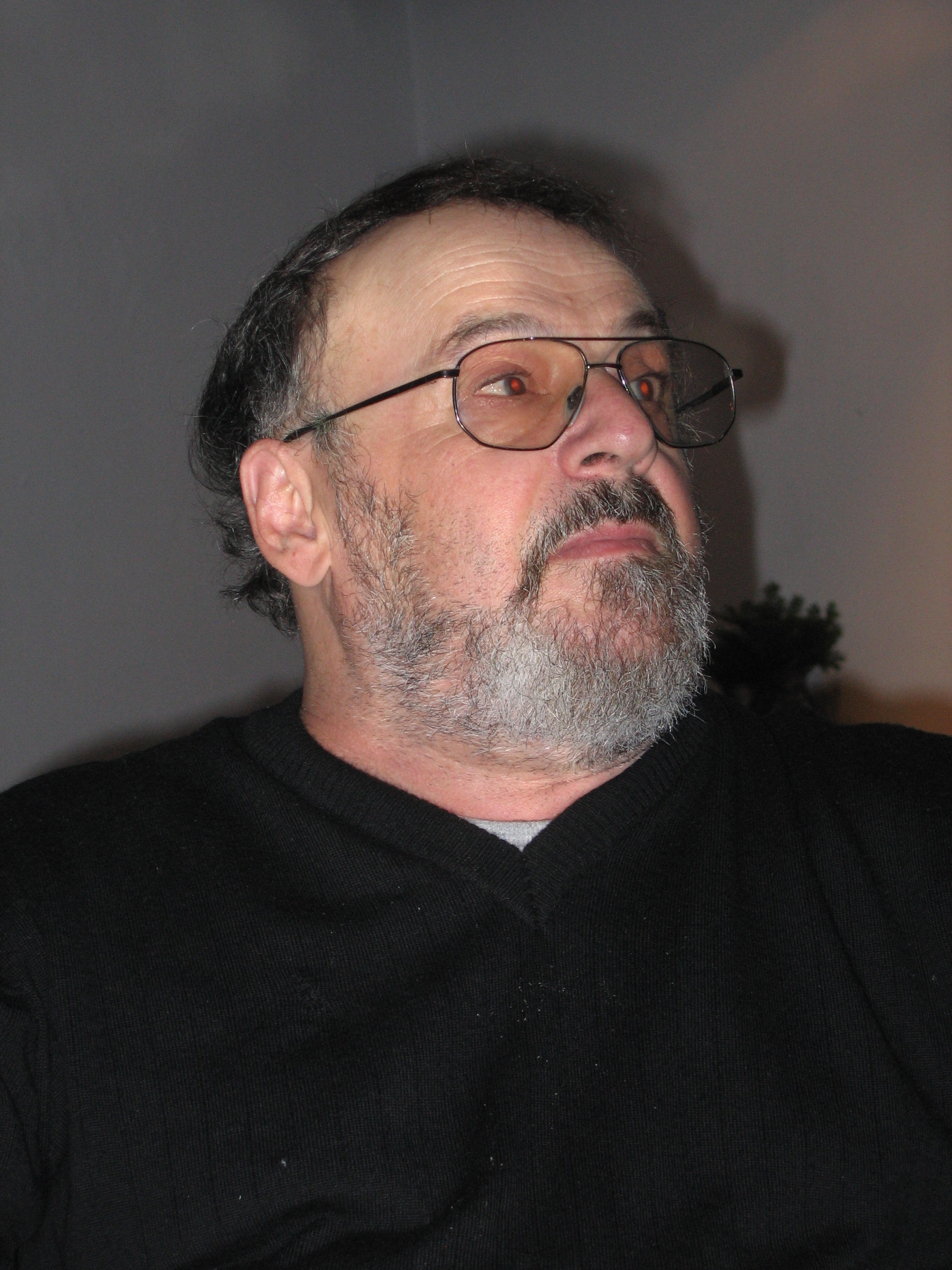
- Born: 11 January 1935; Moscow, Soviet Union
- Died: 20 February 2012 (aged 77); Moscow, Russia
- Writing career
- Notable works: The Grassy Street; Red Caviar Sandwiches

Asar Isayevich Eppel (Russian: Аса́р Иса́евич Э́ппель; 11 January 1935 – 20 February 2012) was a Russian writer and translator.

== Biography ==
Eppel was born in Ostankino, a suburb of Moscow. He studied architecture at the Institute of Civil Engineering. He worked as a translator in the Soviet Union, being unable to publish his fictional works under the Soviet Government. He translated Bruno Schulz and Wisława Szymborska from Polish, the foreign language he is most proficient in, and poems from Petrarch, Boccaccio, Rudyard Kipling and Berthold Brecht.

His works of fiction include the story The Grassy Street (1996) and the novel The Mushroom of My Life (2001).

Eppel died, aged 77, in Moscow.

== English translations ==
- The Grassy Street, The GLAS Series, Vol 18, 1998.
- Red Caviar Sandwiches, Russian Short Stories from Pushkin to Buida, Penguin Classics, 2005.
