= 2017 Tomsk Oblast gubernatorial election =

- 10 September 2017
- Turnout: 25.8%
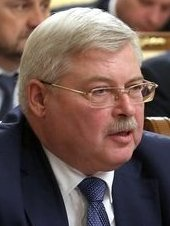

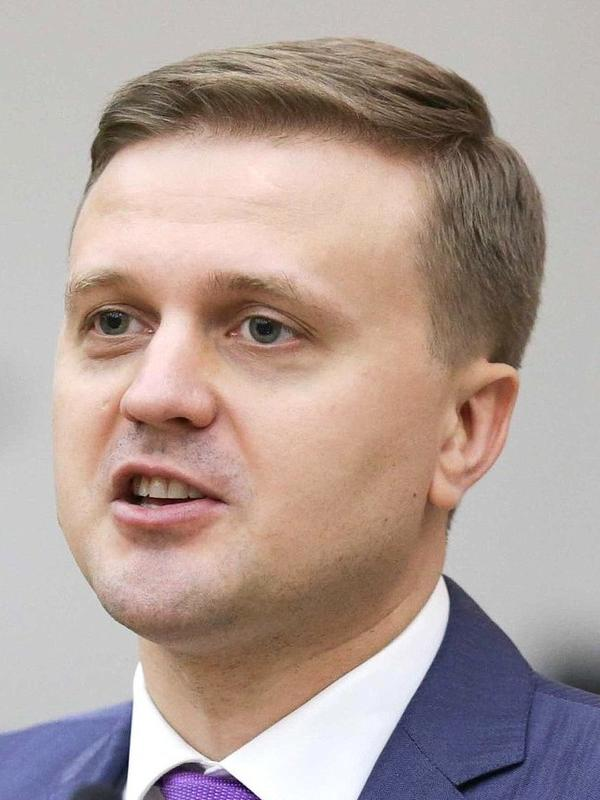
Nominee	Sergey Zhvachkin	Alexei Didenko
Party	United Russia	LDPR
Popular vote	120,441	38,541
Percentage	60.58%	19.38%
	CPRF	SR
Nominee	Natalia Baryshnikova	Alexander Rostovtsev
Party	CPRF	A Just Russia
Popular vote	23,024	12,536
Percentage	11.58%	6.31%
- 2017 Tomsk Oblast gubernatorial election results by municipality
Governor before election
Sergey Zhvachkin
United Russia
Elected Governor
Sergey Zhvachkin
United Russia

Gubernatorial Election in Tomsk Oblast were held on 10 September 2017.

== Candidates ==
Candidates on the ballot:

Candidate	Party	Office
Natalia Baryshnikova; Born 1971 (age 45)	Communist Party	Member of the Legislative Duma of Tomsk Oblast
Alexei Didenko; Born 1983 (age 34)	Liberal Democratic Party	Member of the State Duma
Sergey Zhvachkin; Born 1957 (age 60)	United Russia	Incumbent Governor
Alexander Rostovtsev; Born 1963 (age 54)	A Just Russia	Member of the Legislative Duma of Tomsk Oblast

== Opinion polls ==
Date	Poll source	Zhvachkin	Didenko	Baryshnikova	Rostovtsev	Undecided	Abstention	Spoil the Ballot
10-20 August 2017	WCIOM	44%	12%	5%	3%	20%	14%	1%

== Result ==
Candidate	Party	Votes	%
Sergey Zhvachkin	United Russia	120,441	60.58%
Alexei Didenko	Liberal Democratic Party	38,541	19.38%
Natalia Baryshnikova	Communist Party	23,024	11.58%
Alexander Rostovtsev	A Just Russia	12,536	6.31%
Invalid ballots		4,280	2.15%
Total		198,822	100%

== See also ==
- 2017 Russian gubernatorial elections
