= Igor Vasilyev (politician) =

Russian politician (born 1961)

- Игорь Васильев
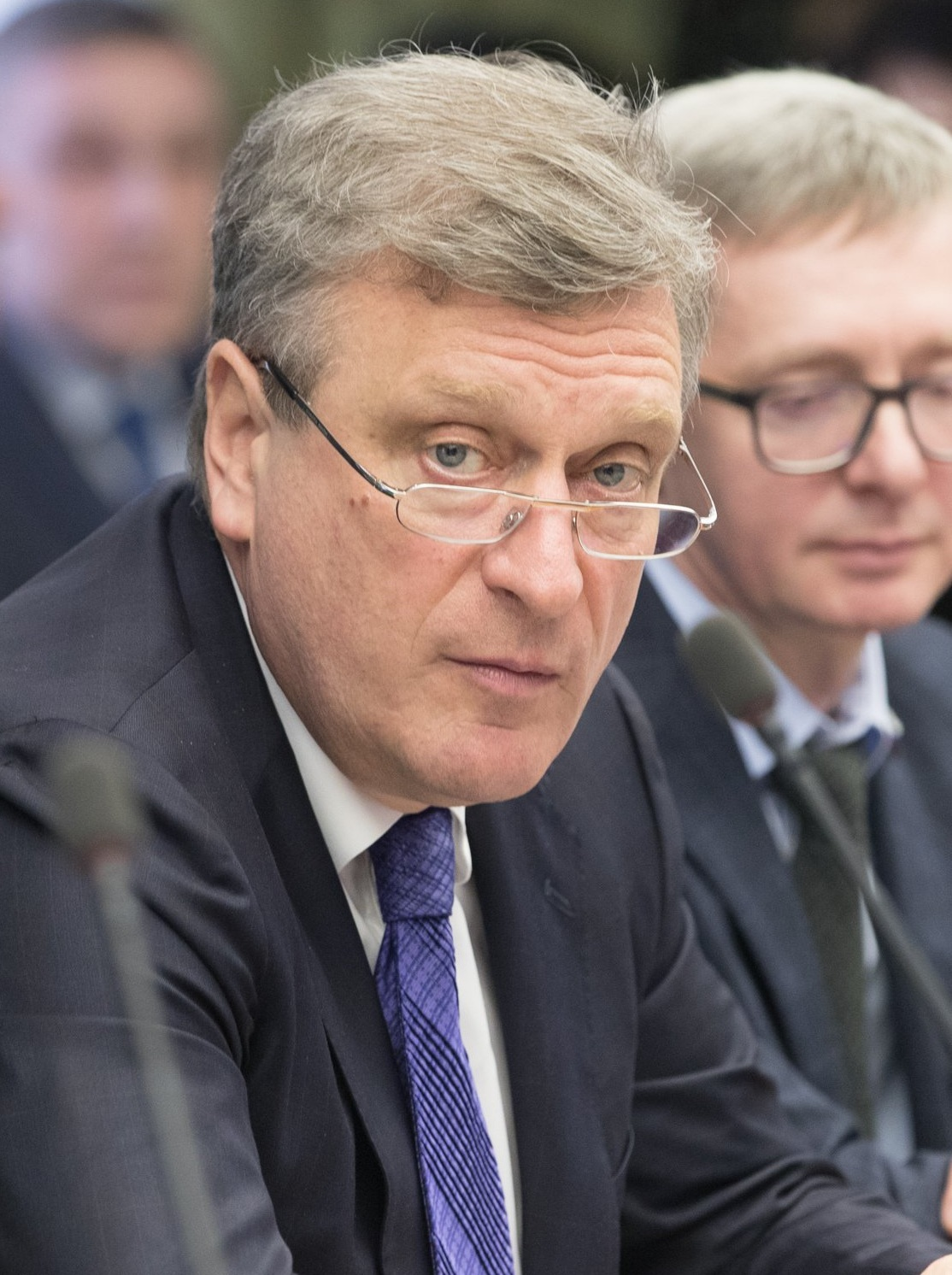
- Vasilyev in 2017

5th Governor of Kirov Oblast
- In office 19 September 2017 – 10 May 2022
- Preceded by: Alexei Kuznetsov (acting); Nikita Belykh
- Succeeded by: Alexander Sokolov

Governor of Kirov Oblast (acting)
- In office 28 July 2016 – 19 September 2017

Head of Rosreestr
- In office 27 March 2014 – 27 June 2016
- Prime Minister: Dmitry Medvedev
- Preceded by: Natalia Antipina
- Succeeded by: Andrew Pridankin (acting); Victoria Abramchenko

Auditor of the Accounts Chamber of Russia
- In office 13 May 2010 – 25 September 2013

Russian Federation Senator from the Komi Republic
- In office 28 October 2004 – 3 March 2010
- Preceded by: Alexei Grishin
- Succeeded by: Vladimir Torlopov

Personal details
- Born: Igor Vladimirovich Vasilyev; 31 May 1961 (age 65) Leningrad, Soviet Union
- Party: United Russia
- Spouse: Lilia Valentinovna
- Education: Leningrad State University

Igor Vladimirovich Vasilyev (Russian: Игорь Владимирович Васильев; born 31 May 1961), from September 19, 2017 to May 10, 2022 was the 5th Governor of the Kirov Oblast.

From 2014 to 2016, he was the Head of the Federal Service for State Registration, Cadastre and Cartography (Rosreestr), and from 2010 to 2013, he was the Auditor of the Accounts Chamber of Russia. From 2004 to 2010, Vasilyev was a member of the Federation Council from the executive body of the Komi Republic. He is a member of the Supreme Council of the United Russia party, and the Secretary of the Kirov regional branch of the United Russia party since 8 November 2019.

== Biography ==
Igor Vasilyev was born on 31 May 1961 in Leningrad. His father, Vladimir, was a military and polar pilot, his mother was a librarian. Vasilyiev graduated from the Physics and Mathematics School, in 1983 - the Faculty of Applied Mathematics and Control Processes of the Leningrad State University, and in 1990 - the Yu. V. Andropov Red Banner Institute. After that, he served for nine years in the artillery troops and in the KGB of the USSR (from 1985 to 1988 - employee of the Directorate of the KGB of the USSR for Leningrad and the Leningrad Region, from 1988 to 1992 - employee of the First Main Directorate of the KGB of the Soviet Union). In the course of his political career, Vasilyev never commented on his work in the authorities, but it is known that for some time he served in the same department as Vladimir Putin.

From 1992 to 2003, Vasilyev worked in various commercial enterprises; what kind of firms they were is not reported in any biographical note. In 2003, he graduated from the Higher School of Business of Moscow State University with a degree in management, from 2003 to 2004 he headed the Investment Department of the Central Executive Committee of the United Russia party, then transferred to the civil service.

From 2004 to 2010, Vasilyev represented the Komi Republic in the Federation Council.

He was a member of the Federation Council committees on financial markets and money circulation, on affairs of the north and small peoples, and was the deputy chairman of the commission for interaction with the Accounts Chamber. On 13 May 2010, the Federation Council appointed Vasilyev as an auditor of the Accounts Chamber, as he was in charge of tax and customs services, the Federal Property Management Agency. on 25 September 2013 he was dismissed as the auditor.

From 2014 to 2016, Vasilyev was the head of Rosreestr.

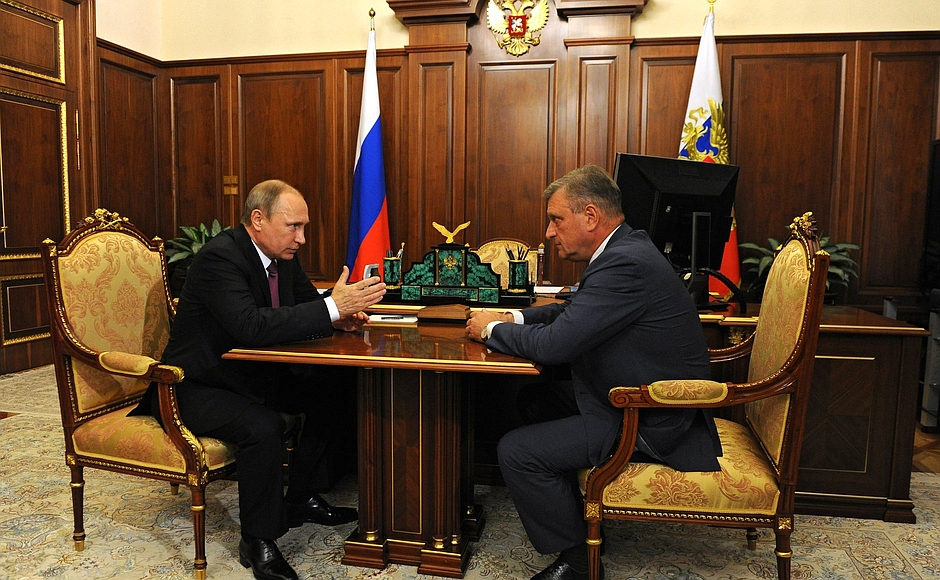
Meeting with President of Russian Federation Vladimir Putin, July 2016

For three times, in 2006, 2010 and 2013, Vasilyev was considered as a candidate for the head of the Komi Republic. However, both times the presidential administration chose a different option.

=== Governor of Kirov Oblast ===
On July 28, 2016, President Putin dismissed the governor of the Kirov Oblast, Nikita Belykh, who was suspected of bribery, and appointed Vasilyev as the interim head of this region.

United Russia nominated Vasilyev for early elections. His competitors were initially Nikolai Barsukov from the Communists of Russia party and the self-nominated candidate Anton Dolgikh, but Dolgikh later withdrew his candidacy, and the candidates Sergei Mamaev from the Communist Party of the Russian Federation and Kirill Cherkasov from the Liberal Democratic Party were added. On 10 September 2017, Vasilyev was elected governor, receiving 64.03% of the votes. On 19 September, Vasilyev took office for a 5-year term.

On 8 December 2018, on the basis of the decision taken by the delegates of the XVIII Congress of the political party "United Russia", Vasilyev was inducted into the Supreme Council of the party.

Since 21 December 2020, he is a member of the Presidium of the State Council of Russia.

In September 2021, Vasilyev was elected to the State Duma of the VIII convocation on the regional party list of United Russia. He was number one on the list, and the party scored the worst ever result of 29.57%. He however refused to be a deputy, as he handed over his mandate to Maria Butina, who was not elected to the State Duma.

On May 10, 2022, Igor Vasilyev announced the resignation of the governor in connection with the end of his term of office.

== Personal life ==
Igor Vasiliev graduated from music school, he plays the guitar. He plays hockey. Igor loves animals, he keeps pets like cats and dogs.

=== Family ===
Vasiliev's wife, Vasilieva Lilia Valentinovna, is, according to official data from the website of the government of the Kirov region, she used to work at MGIMO. In 2017 she entered the top 10 richest wives of the heads of regions.

The exact information about what she was doing now is not publicly available. Meanwhile, her income for 2016 (prior to her husband's election as governor) amounted to 17.3 million rubles, and her husband's income was only 3.8 million. A year later, Vasilyev's income fell to 2.1 million, and his wife's fell to 2.5 million.

They have a daughter, Olga, who graduated from MGIMO.

== Criticism ==
On the eve of the gubernatorial elections, the Civil Initiatives Committee stated in its report that during the year Vasilyev, being the interim head of the region, had been indirectly campaigning in his favor. In particular, the pro-government media actively covered the opening of new hospitals by Vasilyev, although they were built under the Belykhs. LDPR candidate for governor Kirill Cherkasov said on the air of Echo of Moscow: “The team of the interim governor Igor Vasilyev consists of non-professionals who absolutely do not understand the problems of the Kirov region. Key positions in the current regional government are occupied by the Vikings. Obviously, Igor Vasiliev did not fulfill his promise to rely on local personnel."
