= Viktor Kress =

Russian politician (born 1948)

- Виктор Кресс
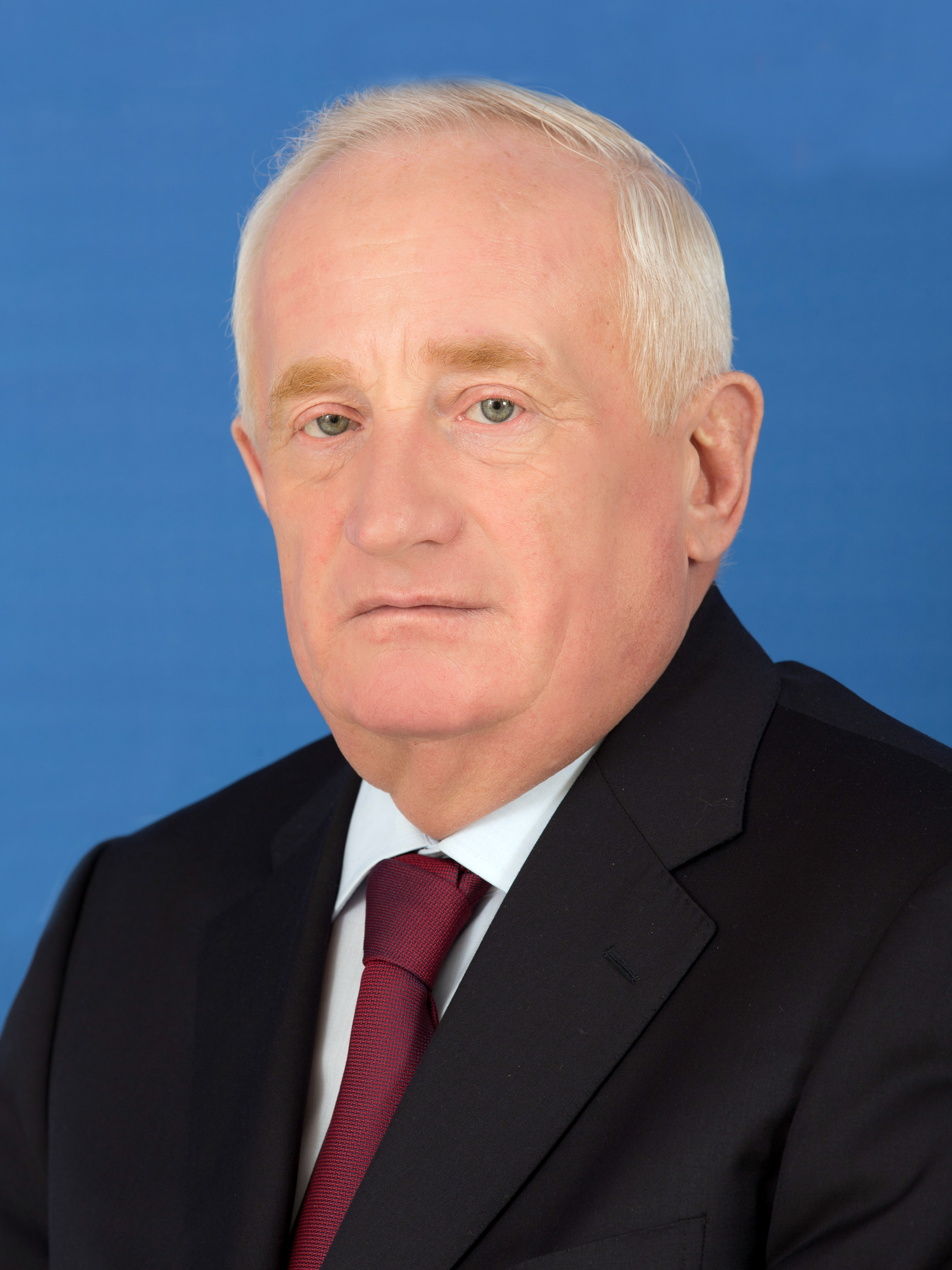

Russian Federation Senator from Tomsk Oblast
- Incumbent
- Assumed office 17 May 2012
- Preceded by: Aleksandr Suvorov

1st Governor of Tomsk Oblast
- In office 29 October 1991 – 17 March 2012
- Succeeded by: Sergey Zhvachkin

Personal details
- Born: Viktor Melkhiorovich Kress; 16 November 1948 (age 77) Vlasovo-Dvorino, Antropovsky District, Kostroma Oblast, RSFSR, Soviet Union
- Political party: United Russia (2004-)

Viktor Melkhiorovich Kress (Russian: Виктор Мельхиорович Кресс; born 16 November 1948) is a Russian politician. He is best known for serving five terms as governor of Tomsk Oblast, Russia from 1991 to 2012.

== Biography ==
Kress was born into a peasant family with five brothers and a sister. Both of his parents were ethnic Germans. During his education he also worked on the farm at the village of Yashkino in Kemerovo Oblast.

Kress graduated from Novosibirsk Agricultural Institute in 1971 as an agricultural economist and worked as an agronomist in Siberia eventually becoming head of the Rodina Sovkhoz near Tomsk. In 1987, he rose to the position of First Secretary of the CPSU committee of Pervomayskoye rayon, Tomsk Oblast. In 1990, Kress was elected and served as speaker of the Tomsk Oblast Soviet. In 1991, after the Dissolution of the Soviet Union, President Boris Yeltsin appointed him as governor of Tomsk Oblast. Kress won re-election by popular vote three times, in 1995, 1999 and 2003. In 2007, President Vladimir Putin, who had ended the direct election of governors, nominated him for a fifth term, which he won by a vote of the Regional Duma. On March 17, 2012, Kress resigned as governor.

On May 17, 2012, Kress' successor, Governor Sergey Zhvachkin, appointed him to the Federation Council as the representative of Tomsk Oblast. He serves as the Deputy Chairman of the Committee on Science, Education, Culture and Information Policy.

Kress became a member of the United Russia party in 2004.

== Books ==
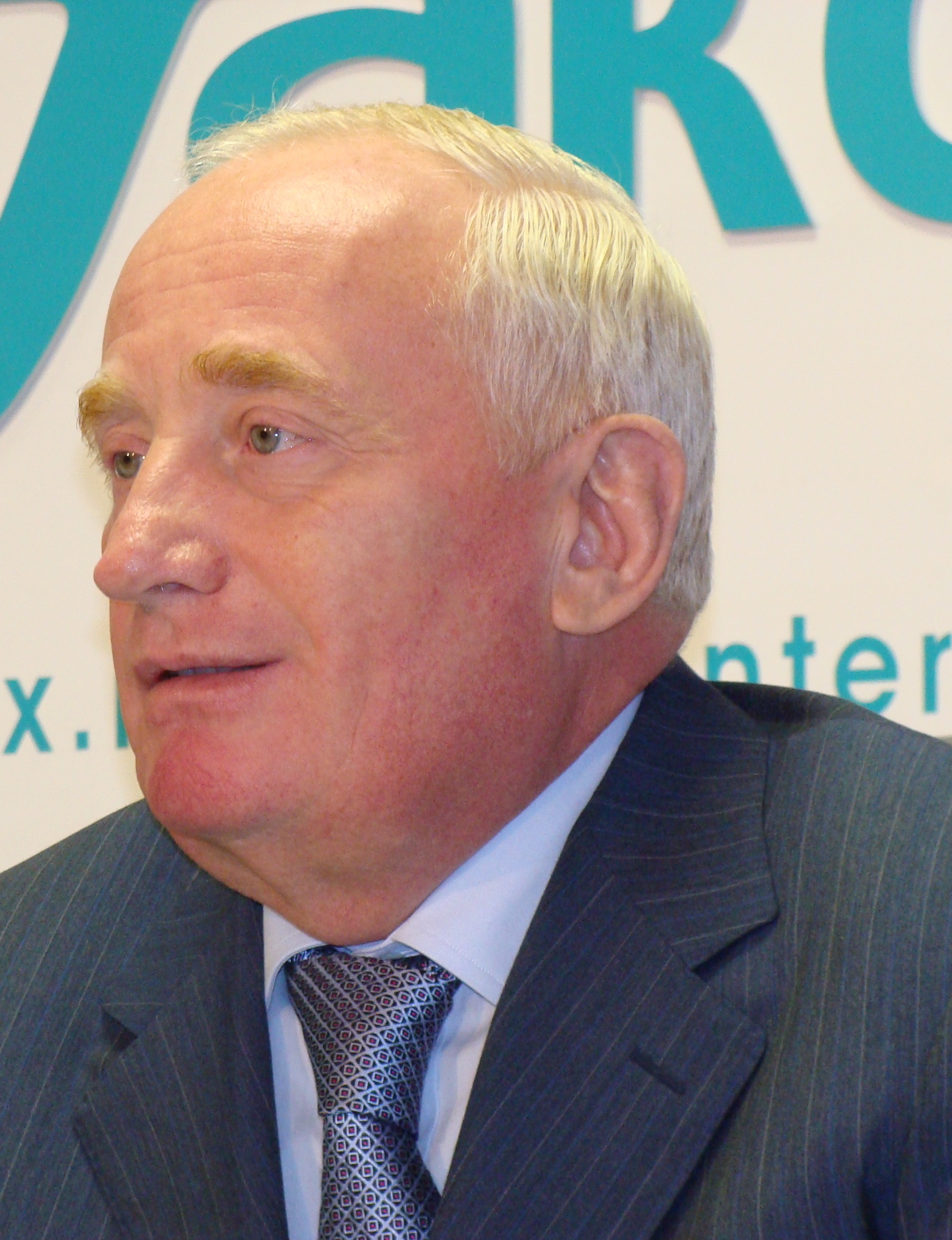
Viktor Kress on an Interfax press-conference (2008)

Kress has also authored five books

1. Difficult Times of Russia: A Look at the Provinces (1998)
2. Tomsk Oblast: Today and Tomorrow (1999)
3. Tomsk Oblast at the Crossroads of the Centuries (1999)
4. Tomsk Oblast: The Start of the 21st Century (2002)
5. Direct Answers to Complex Questions (2003)

== Personal life ==
Kress is married to Lyudmila Kress and has two children, His daughter Elena is a cardiologist and his son Vyacheslav is judge at the Seventh appellant arbriage court. He has four grandchildren.

=== Sanctions ===
Kress was sanctioned by the British government and the European Union in 2022 as a result of the Russian invasion of Ukraine.

== Honours and awards ==
- Order of Merit for the Fatherland;
  - 3rd class (16 November 2008) - for his great personal contribution to the socio-economic development of the field and many years of diligent work
  - 4th class (13 November 1998) - for services to the state and a major contribution to socio-economic development of the region
- Order of the Badge of Honour
- Medal "For Labour Valour"
- Diploma of the President of the Russian Federation (12 December 2008) - for active participation in the drafting of the Constitution and a great contribution to the democratic foundations of the Russian Federation
- Order of Holy Prince Daniel of Moscow, 1st class (Russian Orthodox Church, 2002)
- Breastplate of the Foreign Ministry of Russia "for contribution to international cooperation" (2008) - for active international activity for the development of international co-operation of Tomsk region with the European Union, Southeast Asia, Israel, United States
- Honorary Citizen of the Tomsk region (2008) - for outstanding contribution to the objectives of socio-economic development of the Tomsk region, many years of fruitful work
- Honorary citizen of Tomsk (2004)
- Badge "For Services to the Tomsk region" (26 February 2004) - for his great personal contribution to the socio-economic development, successful management of the area during the period of political and economic reforms, stability, peace and harmony on earth
- Badge of Honour "for his services in promoting the Olympic Movement in Russia" (2004, R & D)
- Order of St. Sergius, 1st class (2008, Russian Orthodox Church)
- Order of Merit of the Federal Republic of Germany - November 23, 2010
