= Sergey Zhvachkin =

Russian politician (born 1957)

- Сергей Жвачкин
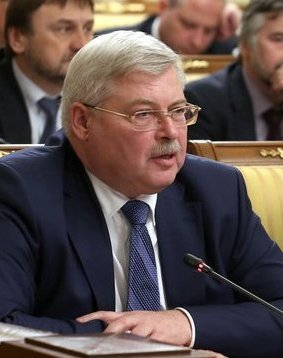
- Zhvachkin in 2014

2nd Governor of Tomsk Oblast
- In office 17 March 2012 – 10 May 2022 (acting 21 February 2017-10 September 2017)
- President: Dmitry Medvedev; Vladimir Putin
- Preceded by: Viktor Kress
- Succeeded by: Vladimir Mazur

Personal details
- Born: Sergey Anatolyevich Zhvachkin; 20 January 1957 (age 69) Molotov (now Perm), Perm Krai, RSFSR, Soviet Union
- Party: United Russia
- Website: Official Biography

Sergey Anatolyevich Zhvachkin (Russian: Сергей Анатольевич Жвачкин; born 20 January 1957) is a Russian politician and a member of United Russia. From 1999 to 2007, he was a deputy in the Legislative Duma of Tomsk Oblast, from 2012 to 2022 he served as the 2nd Governor of Tomsk Oblast. Prior to entering politics, he was a manager in the oil and gas industry.

== Biography ==
Sergey Zhvachkin was born on 20 January 1957 in the city of Molotov, Soviet Union, which is now known as Perm. He graduated from Tyumen State University of Engineering and Construction in 1979 and the Gorky Institute of Engineering and Construction in 1983. In the 1980s and 1990s he was a manager in various capacities at oil and gas companies in Tomsk Oblast. In 1991, he graduated from an economics institute in Kiel, Germany.

In 1999, he was elected to the Tomsk Duma. He served on the economic policy committee as well as the committee for natural resources, oil and gas industry and energy. He was appointed as the general director of Kubangazprom, a subsidiary of Gazprom in 2004, but continued to serve on the Tomsk Duma. In 2007, he was appointed at the head of Gazprom-TransGaz-Krasnodar, which coincided with the end of his term in the Duma.

From 1999 to 2012, he was also the President of the soccer team, FC Tom Tomsk.

In 2012, Viktor Kress stepped down and was appointed to the Federation Council (Russia). In accordance with the procedure at the time, the Legislative Duma of Tomsk presented three candidates to Russian President Dmitry Medvedev, including Zhvachkin, the Duma speaker Sergey Ilinykh and the rector of Tomsk Polytechnic University Petr S. Chubik. Medvedev nominated Zhvachkin and presented him to the Duma for confirmation on 2 February 2012. The Duma of Tomsk confirmed him in his position on 15 February 2012. He assumed the governorship on 17 March 2012.

On 21 February 2017, ahead of the direct election for governors, Zhvachkin resigned and was immediately appointed as acting governor by Vladimir Putin. On 10 September 2017, Zhvachkin won a full term in the 2017 gubernatorial election with 60.58% of the vote. By 10 May 2022 Sergey Zhvachkin has resigned.
