= Aleksandr Sokolov (politician, born 1970) =

Russian politician

- Александр Соколов
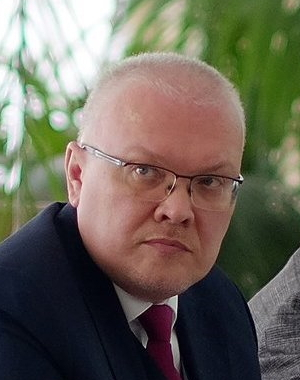
- Sokolov in 2022

6th Governor of Kirov Oblast
- Incumbent
- Assumed office 23 September 2022
- Preceded by: Igor Vasilyev

Personal details
- Born: 4 August 1970 (age 55) Kostroma, Soviet Union
- Party: United Russia

Aleksandr Valentinovich Sokolov (Russian: Александр Валентинович Соколов; born 4 August 1970) is a Russian politician serving as the governor of Kirov Oblast since 23 September 2022; previously he served as acting governor from 10 May 2022.

== Biography ==
Aleksandr Sokolov was born in Kostroma on 4 August 1970.

He graduated from Moscow State Institute of International Relations, and started as a history teacher. He worked as the first deputy governor of the Kostroma Oblast for domestic policy, in addition, he oversaw culture, cultural heritage and youth.

He was marked with gratitude from the President of Russia in 2000.

In 2014 Sokolov was appointed the Deputy Governor of Kostroma Oblast for Domestic Policy, then promoted to First Deputy Governor.

In 2017 he left the service in the Kostroma authorities and moved to the position of assistant in the Presidential Administration in the department for ensuring the activities of the State Council of Russia.

He was awarded with the Acting State Councilor Class III in 2018.

On 10 May 2022 Sokolov became the acting governor of Kirov Oblast.

== Awards ==
2006 – Honorary Member of the Russian Youth Union

2010 – A trusted representative of Russian presidential candidate Vladimir Putin

2011 – Candidate of Political Sciences
