= Nikita Belykh =

Russian politician (born 1975)

- Никита Белых
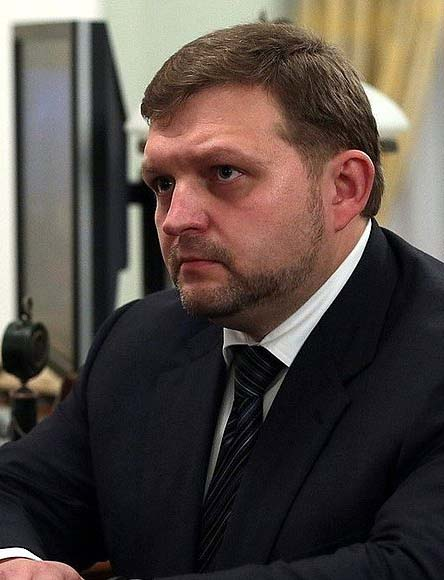
- Belykh in 2013

4th Governor of Kirov Oblast
- In office January 15, 2009 – July 28, 2016
- Preceded by: Nikolay Shaklein
- Succeeded by: Aleksey Kuznetsov (acting); Igor Vasilyev

Leader of the Union of Right Forces
- In office May 28, 2005 – September 26, 2008
- Preceded by: Viktor Nekrutenko
- Succeeded by: Leonid Gozman (acting)

Personal details
- Born: June 13, 1975 (age 51) Perm, Russian SFSR, Soviet Union
- Party: Union of Right Forces (2001–2008)
- Education: Perm State University

Nikita Yuryevich Belykh (Russian: Ники́та Ю́рьевич Белы́х, born June 13, 1975) is a Russian politician and former leader of the Union of Rightist Forces party. He was a member of the Legislative Assembly of Perm Krai until 2008, and the governor of Kirov Oblast from January 2009 until his arrest in July 2016.

== Biography ==
Nikita Belykh was born on June 13, 1975. He graduated from Perm State University. In 1998, he became vice president of the Perm Financial-Industrial Group. In 2001, Belykh was first elected to the Legislative Assembly of the Perm Oblast, where he became chairman of the committee on economic policy and taxation.

In December 2003, Belykh was a parliamentary candidate for the Union of Right Forces, which failed to pass the nationwide 5% threshold required for entering the State Duma. In March 2004, he was appointed Deputy Governor of the Perm Oblast.

On May 28, 2005, Belykh was elected leader of the Union of Right Forces, a leading opposition party, succeeding Boris Nemtsov. He thereby resigned as Deputy Governor of the Perm Oblast. As party leader, Belykh adopted a line of strict opposition to Russian President Vladimir Putin and launched coalition talks with the Yabloko party.

As a result of the agreement between Belykh and Grigory Yavlinsky reached in October 2005, the Union of Right Forces and Yabloko formed a coalition, Yabloko-United Democrats, to contest the Moscow City Duma elections on December 4, 2005. The coalition won 11% of the vote and became one of only three parties (along with United Russia and the Communist Party) to enter the new Moscow legislature.

In December 2006 the Union of Right Forces received 16% of the vote in the regional legislative elections in Perm Krai. Belykh, who headed the party list, was elected to the Legislative Assembly.

In September 2008 Belykh announced that he had resigned from his position and left the Union of Right Forces in connection with its likely merger with a couple of pro-Kremlin parties.

On December 8, 2008, Belykh was nominated governor of Kirov Oblast after a personal meeting with Dmitry Medvedev. (From July 2009 till June 2011 Maria Gaidar was an official responsible for socio-economic development in the Kirov Oblast.)

=== Detention ===
On June 24, 2016, Belykh was arrested in a bar by the Russian Investigative Committee, allegedly for receiving a bribe of €400,000. While under investigation he faced up to 15 years of jail time. He denied taking bribes or any other wrongdoing. According to Dmitry Peskov, Vladimir Putin was not consulted about making the arrest. Belykh was convicted of bribery in February 2018 and sentenced to eight years in prison, a 48.5 million ruble ($866,000) fine, and was barred from holding public office for three years. Belykh was released on June 21, 2024, having served his sentence in full.

== Present time ==
Since August 2024 Nikita Belykh has held the position of vice CEO for corporate affairs of JSC Confectionery Factory Permskaya.

== Awards ==
- 2010 — Breastplate "For the Merits" of the Federal Drug Control Service
- 2012 — Medal "For Merits in conducting the all-Russian Population Census of 2010"
- 2015 — Badge of the Ministry of Foreign Affairs of the Russian Federation "For contribution to international cooperation"
