= Legislative Assembly of Kirov Oblast =

Regional parliament of Kirov Oblast, Russia

Legislative Assembly of Kirov Oblast Законодательное собрание Кировской области
- 7th legislature

Type
- Type: Unicameral

Leadership
- Chairman: Roman Beresnev, United Russia since 2021

Structure
- Seats: 40
- Political groups: United Russia (24) SRZP (9); LDPR (3); CPRF (2); New People (1) RPPSJ (1)

Elections
- Voting system: Mixed
- Last election: 19 September 2021
- Next election: 2026

Meeting place
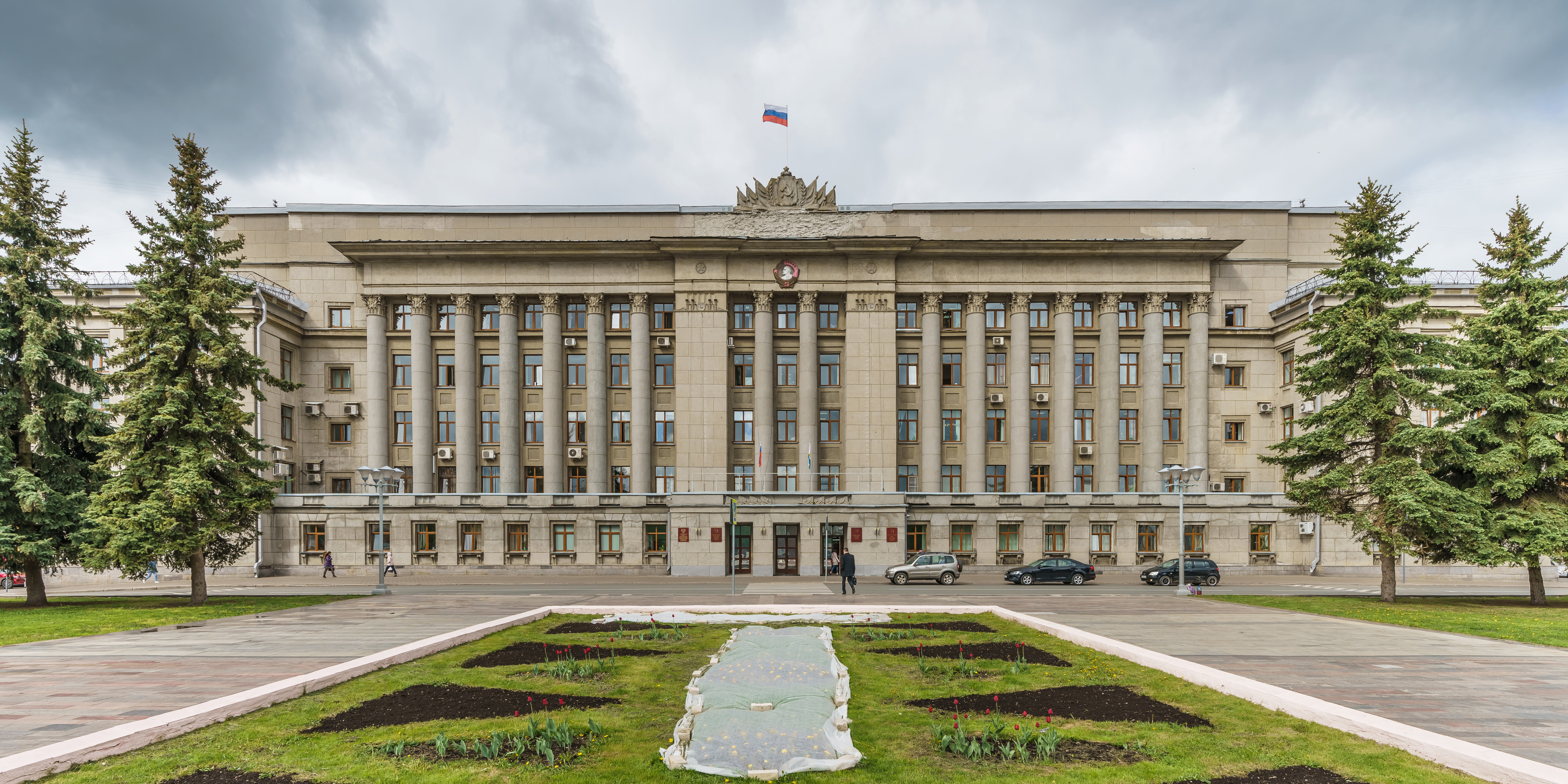
- 69 Karl Liebknecht Street, Kirov

Website
- zsko.ru

The Legislative Assembly of Kirov Oblast (Russian: Законодательное собрание Кировской области, romanized: Zakonodatel'noye sobraniye Kirovskoy oblasti) is the regional parliament of Kirov Oblast, a federal subject of Russia. A total of 40 deputies are elected for five-year terms.

== Elections ==
=== 2021 ===
Party	%	Seats
United Russia	27.26	24
A Just Russia — For Truth	19.68	9
Communist Party of the Russian Federation	17.75	2
Liberal Democratic Party of Russia	13.78	3
New People	8.79	1
Russian Party of Pensioners for Social Justice	6.16	1
Registered voters/turnout	44.49	
