= Legislative Duma of Tomsk Oblast =

Regional parliament of Tomsk Oblast, Russia

Legislative Assembly of Tomsk Oblast Законодательная дума Томской области (Russian)

Leadership
- Chairwoman: Oksana Kozlovskaya

Structure
- Seats: 42
- Political groups: United Russia (27); CPRF (7); LDPR (3); SRZP (3); New People (2)

Elections
- Last election: 19 September 2021
- Next election: 2026

Meeting place
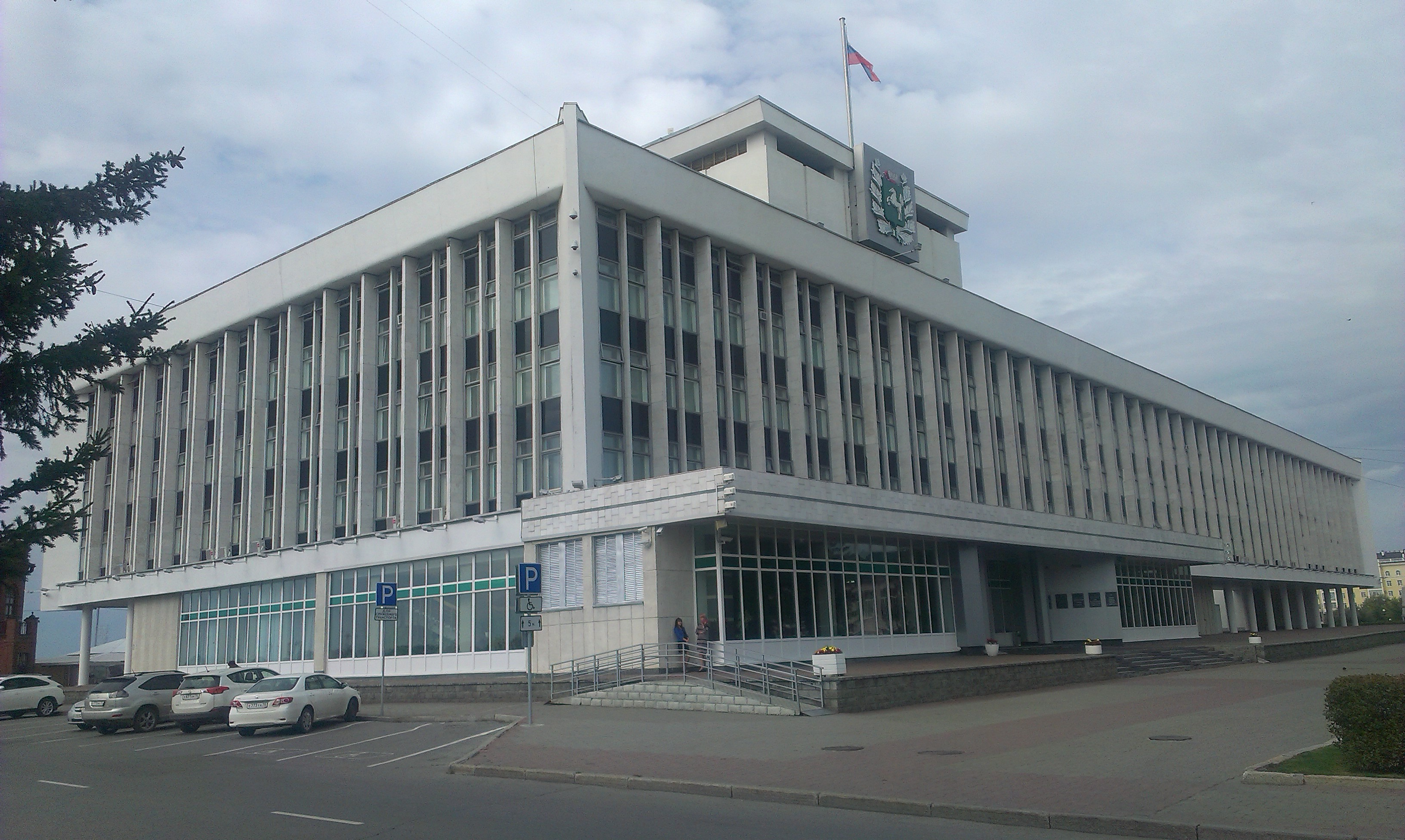
- 6 Lenin Square, Tomsk

Website
- http://duma.tomsk.ru/

The Legislative Duma of Tomsk Oblast (formerly State Duma of Tomsk Oblast) is the standing regional legislative parliament of the government of Tomsk Oblast, a single-chamber body of 42 deputies.

== Overview ==
Half of the 42 deputies are elected by a proportional system and the other half by single-member constituencies. Deputies are elected by the population of the region on the basis of universal, equal and direct suffrage by secret ballot for a period of 5 years.

The Duma adopts laws, resolutions, statements, appeals and also conducts control activities. Funded from the regional budget.

Legislative elections were held in 1994, 1997, 2001, 2007, 2011 and 2016. The last elections took place in September 2016.

Every year the Regional Duma organizes a competition for the title “Laureate of the Prize of the Legislative Duma of the Tomsk Region for young scientists and young talents”; also, outstanding Tomsk citizens are encouraged by a whole system of regional awards.

For a long time, a democratic (with minimal moderation of outright vandalism) discussion forum operated on the official website, including the 43rd deputy with a section of people's legislative proposals. The purpose of the Forum is a discussion of site visitors on issues of lawmaking and on expressing opinions on the main burning issues of the region and country. The names of the topics and their content were not subjected to special political censorship. The main condition for the existence of a topic or message on the forum was the rule of consistency with the legislation of the Russian Federation. The topic of communication was not strictly regulated, but it was assumed that it should correspond to the informational focus of the site and help the deputies navigate the mood of the electorate, indicate the Tomsk topical problems. In the spring of 2013, the forum was closed for reconstruction.

== Chairpersons of the Legislative Duma of Tomsk Oblast ==
| Name | Period |
|---|---|
| Boris Maltsev | 1994–2011 |
| Oksana Kozlovskaya | 2011–Incumbent |

== Structure ==
The Legislative Duma of Tomsk Oblast is a permanent acting supreme and only legislative (representative) body of state power of Tomsk Oblast.

Legislative, representative and supervising functions of The Duma are determined by the Charter (Principal Law) of Tomsk Oblast and other laws of Tomsk Oblast in accordance with the Constitution of the Russian Federation and federal laws.

Before January 2011, this body was called the State Duma of Tomsk Oblast. Before the State Duma of Tomsk Oblast, it was called the Tomsk Oblast Duma. In turn, this was the successor of the Tomsk Oblast Council of People's Deputies.

The 6th Legislative Duma of Tomsk Oblast has 5 currently working committees:

- Committee on Budget and Finance
- Committee on Legislation, State Structure and Security
- Committee on Construction, Infrastructure and Environmental Management
- Committee on Labor and Social Policy
- Committee on Economic Policy

The powers of the Legislative Duma of Tomsk Oblast: The Legislative Duma of Tomsk Oblast is authorized to: –adopt the Charter (Principal Law), laws and other normative legal acts of Tomsk Oblast; –approve the regional budget and report on its implementation; –approve the social and economic development strategy of Tomsk Oblast; –establish regional taxes and regional tax exemptions; –establish the procedure for the privatization of property in Tomsk Oblast, and the procedure for the management and disposal of property in the Oblast; –hear the annual reports of the governor of Tomsk Oblast on the performance results of the executive body of state power of Tomsk Oblast, including with regard to matters raised by the Legislative Duma of Tomsk Oblast; – resolve matters of the administrative and territorial system of the Oblast; – submit draft federal laws to the State Duma of the Federal Assembly of the Russian Federation; – identify the procedure for elections to the Legislative Duma of Tomsk Oblast, and elections of the governor of Tomsk Oblast; – fix the elections to the Legislative Duma of Tomsk Oblast and elections of the governor of Tomsk Oblast; – establish the procedure for elections to local government bodies in Tomsk Oblast; – determine the procedure for regional and local referendums; – decide to call a regional referendum; – empower the member of The Council of The Federation of the Federal Assembly of the Russian Federation representing the Legislative Duma of Tomsk Oblast; – appoint justices of the peace; – approve the concept of the General Prosecutor of the Russian Federation on the appointment of the Oblast's prosecutor; – appoint the Ombudsman for Human Rights in Tomsk Oblast and the Ombudsman for Children's Rights in Tomsk Oblast; to nominate a candidate for the position of Business Rights Commissioner in Tomsk Oblast to The governor of Tomsk Oblast; – appoint half of the members of the Election Commission of Tomsk Oblast; – appoint the chairman, deputy chairman, and auditors of the Chamber of Control and Accounts of Tomsk Oblast; – adopt laws on administrative offenses; – establish liability for the violation of laws and other normative legal acts of the Oblast published with respect to issues within its competence; – exercise other powers in accordance with the Constitution of the Russian Federation, federal constitutional laws, federal laws, the Charter (Principal Law) and other laws of Tomsk Oblast.

The Duma oversees observance and execution of laws and other regional normative legal acts, regional budget, usage of credit resources and allocations from the budget of the Russian Federation and regional budget, budgetary means of local State non-budgetary fund, and the implementation of the social and economic development strategy of the Oblast.

It also oversees the disposal of the regional, federal and other property transferred in management to the state power bodies of the Oblast, and performs other oversight functions in accordance with federal and regional laws.

== Composition ==
=== 2016 ===
| Party | Seats |
|---|---|
| United Russia | 31 |
| Liberal Democratic Party of Russia | 5 |
| Communist Party of Russian Federation | 4 |
| A Just Russia | 2 |
| Civic Platform | 0 |

=== 2021 ===
| Party | Seats |
|---|---|
| United Russia | 27 |
| Communist Party of Russian Federation | 7 |
| Liberal Democratic Party of Russia | 3 |
| A Just Russia | 3 |
| New People | 2 |
