= 2022 Yaroslavl Oblast gubernatorial election =

← 2017	9–11 September 2022	2027 →
- Turnout: 26.65%
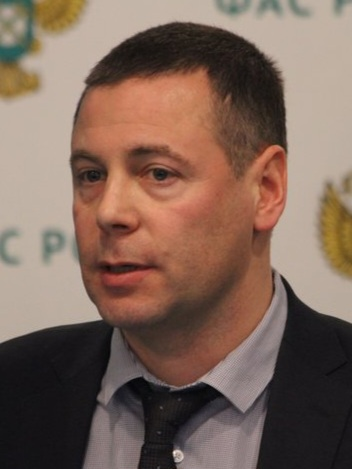
		CPRF
Nominee	Mikhail Yevrayev	Mikhail Paramonov
Party	Independent	CPRF
Popular vote	217,995	16,263
Percentage	82.31%	6.14%
Governor before election
Mikhail Yevrayev (acting)
Independent
Elected Governor
Mikhail Yevrayev
Independent

The 2022 Yaroslavl Oblast gubernatorial election took place on 9–11 September 2022, on common election day. Acting Governor Mikhail Yevrayev was elected to a full term.

== Background ==
Deputy Minister of Internal Affairs Dmitry Mironov was appointed acting Governor of Yaroslavl Oblast in July 2016, replacing first term incumbent Sergey Yastrebov. Mironov won election for a full term as United Russia candidate in 2017 with 79.32% of the vote. Aleksey Dyumin became the first of "Putin's adjutants" – a group of Russian governors appointed in 2016–2018 who previously served in Federal Protective Service for President Putin, besides Dyumin, this group consists of former acting Kaliningrad Oblast Governor Yevgeny Zinichev (2016) and former acting Astrakhan Oblast Governor Sergey Morozov (2018–2019). In the 2021 Russian legislative election in Yaroslavl Oblast, United Russia suffered notable defeat, as it scored inly 29.72% of the vote (5th worst result nationally), while both single-mandate constituencies were won by SR-ZP candidates – Anatoly Greshnevikov and Anatoly Lisitsyn. On 12 October 2021, Assistant to the President Anatoly Seryshev was appointed Presidential Envoy to the Siberian Federal District, while Dmitry Mironov received Seryshev's position. The same day, former Deputy Head of the Federal Antimonopoly Service Mikhail Yevrayev was appointed acting Governor of Yaroslavl Oblast.

Due to the start of the Russian invasion of Ukraine in February 2022 and subsequent economic sanctions, the cancellation and postponement of direct gubernatorial elections was proposed. The measure was even supported by A Just Russia leader Sergey Mironov. Eventually, on 7 June, the Yaroslavl Oblast Duma called the gubernatorial election for 11 September 2022.

== Candidates ==
Until 2022 only political parties can nominate candidates for gubernatorial election in Yaroslavl Oblast, however, in May 2022 Yaroslavl Oblast Duma passed a law, allowing self-nomination in the gubernatorial elections. Candidate for Governor of Yaroslavl Oblast should be a Russian citizen and at least 30 years old. Each candidate in order to be registered is required to collect at least 5% of signatures of members and heads of municipalities (52 signatures). Self-nominating candidates in addition should collect signatures of 9,980 registered voters. Also gubernatorial candidates present three candidacies to the Federation Council and election winner later appoints one of the presented candidates.

=== Registered ===
- Igor Miloradov (Communists of Russia), aide to Yaroslavl Oblast Duma member
- Mikhail Paramonov (CPRF), former Member of Yaroslavl Oblast Duma (2008–2013, 2016–2018), 2017 gubernatorial candidate
- Vladimir Smirnov (LDPR), Member of Yaroslavl Oblast Duma
- Konstantin Tukeyev (RPPSS), engineer
- Mikhail Yevrayev (Independent), acting Governor of Yaroslavl Oblast, former Deputy Head of Federal Antimonopoly Service (2018–2021)

=== Did not file ===
- Aleksey Antipov (Independent), auto repairer
- Sergey Balabayev (Yabloko), former Member of Yaroslavl Oblast Duma (2013–2018), 2017 PARNAS gubernatorial candidate

=== Declined ===
- Denis Dobryakov (United Russia), former mayor of Rybinsk
- Anatoly Greshnevikov (SR-ZP), Member of State Duma
- Tina Kandelaki, journalist
- Anatoly Lisitsyn (SR-ZP), Member of State Duma, former Governor of Yaroslavl Oblast (1991–2007)
- Yevgeny Prilepin (SR-ZP), Co-chairman of A Just Russia — For Truth, writer, former Member of State Duma (2021)

=== Candidates for Federation Council ===
Incumbent Senator Sergey Beryozkin was not renominated.

- Igor Miloradov (Communists of Russia):
  - Dmitry Garbul, self-employed, former Yaroslavl Oblast Duma staffer
  - Maria Lebedeva, dietician
  - Viktor Perunov, obstetrician
- Mikhail Paramonov (CPRF):
  - Natalya Bobryakova, Member of Yaroslavl Municipal Council
  - Yelena Kuznetsova, Member of Yaroslavl Oblast Duma
  - Elkhan Mardaliyev, Member of Yaroslavl Oblast Duma
- Vladimir Smirnov (LDPR):
  - Irina Lobanova, Member of Yaroslavl Oblast Duma
  - Marina Savelyeva, employment service specialist
  - Aleksandr Yerofeyev, engineer
- Mikhail Yevrayev (Independent):
  - Nikolay Burlyayev (SR-ZP), Member of State Duma
  - Viktor Kostin, Chief Federal Inspector for Moscow, former First Deputy Chairman of the Government of Yaroslavl Oblast (2016–2018)
  - Aleksandr Rusakov, Rector of Yaroslavl State University

== Results ==
Summary of the 9–11 September 2022 Yaroslavl Oblast gubernatorial election results
Candidate	Party	Votes	%
Mikhail Yevrayev (incumbent)	Independent	217,995	82.31
Mikhail Paramonov	Communist Party	16,263	6.14
Vladimir Smirnov	Liberal Democratic Party	11,055	4.17
Igor Miloradov	Communists of Russia	9,059	3.42
Konstantin Tukeyev	Party of Pensioners	5,538	2.09
Valid votes		259,910	98.13
Blank ballots		4,943	1.87
Total		264,854	100.00
Turnout		264,854	26.65
Registered voters		993,990	100.00

Yaroslavl State University Rector Aleksandr Rusakov (United Russia) was appointed to the Federation Council, replacing incumbent senator Sergey Beryozkin (Independent).

== See also ==
- 2022 Russian gubernatorial elections
