= Mikhail Yevrayev =

Russian politician

- Михаил Евраев
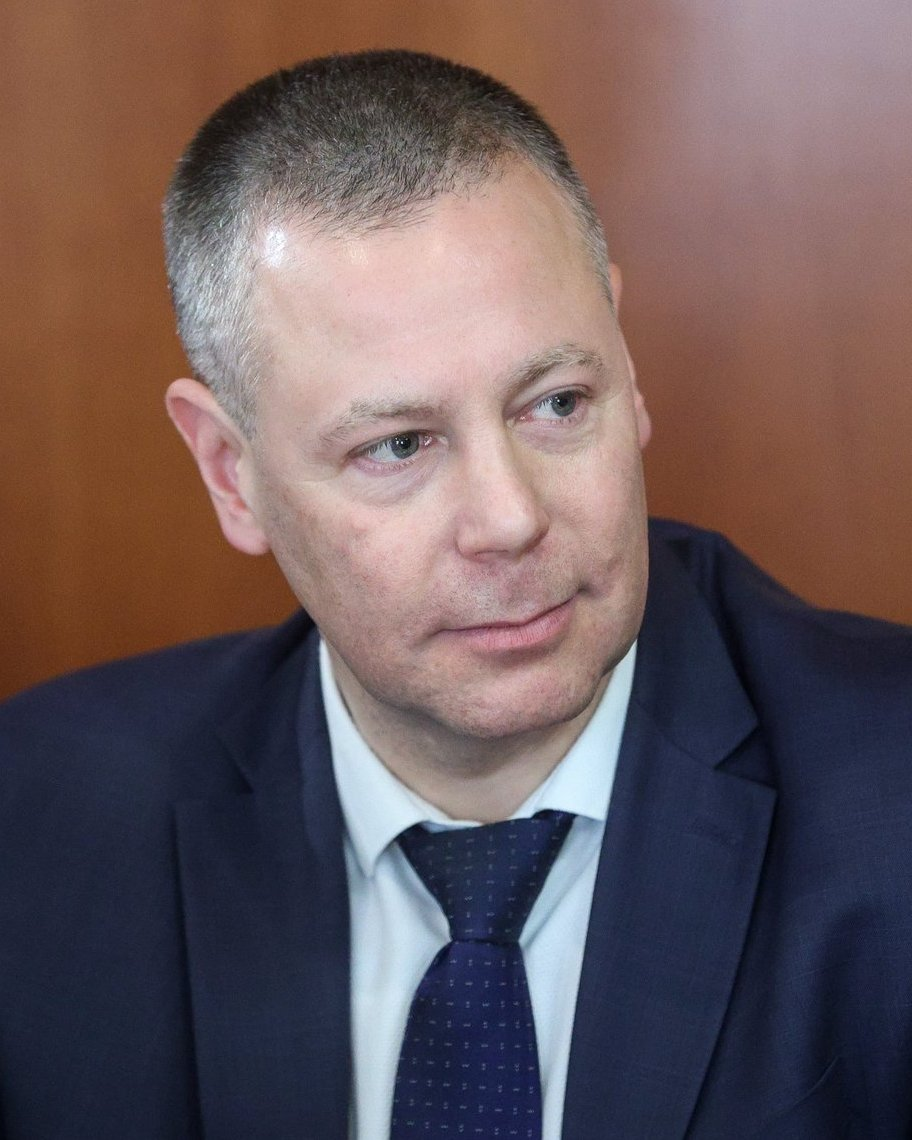
- Yevrayev in 2024

Governor of Yaroslavl Oblast
- Incumbent
- Assumed office 12 October 2021
- Preceded by: Dmitry Mironov

Deputy Head of Federal Antimonopoly Service
- In office 27 November 2018 – 12 February 2021
- Prime Minister: Dmitry Medvedev; Mikhail Mishustin
- Head: Igor Artemyev; Maksim Shaskolsky

Deputy Minister of Communications and Mass Media
- In office 24 December 2012 – 24 July 2018
- Prime Minister: Dmitry Medvedev
- Minister: Nikolay Nikiforov; Konstantin Noskov

Deputy Minister of Regional Development
- In office 11 October 2012 – 24 December 2012
- Prime Minister: Dmitry Medvedev
- Minister: Oleg Govorun; Igor Albin

Personal details
- Born: 21 April 1971 (age 55) Leningrad, Russian SFSR, Soviet Union
- Party: nonpartisan (since 2018), Yabloko (1999-2018)
- Children: 2
- Education: Saint Petersburg State University of Economics

Mikhail Yakovlevich Yevrayev (Russian: Михаил Яковлевич Евраев; born 21 April 1971) is a Russian politician and Governor of Yaroslavl Oblast.

== Biography ==
Mikhail Yevrayev was born on 21 April 1971 in Leningrad, Russian SFSR (now Saint Petersburg). Until 1988, Yevrayev worked as a turner at the Kalinin Plant.

In 1988, he enrolled at Leningrad Financial-Economic Institute, where he studied at the faculty of "scientific labour organisation" (graduated in 1993). During his student years he also was a member of a construction brigade, which worked on the Baikal–Amur Mainline. In 1991–2000, Yevrayev worked as an expert, head of finance and legal and director for economy and finance at an unspecified firm. In 1999, Yevrayev graduated Saint Petersburg State University with a degree in law.

Yevrayev joined Yabloko in 1999. Since 2001, Yevrayev served as chairman of the party's Vasilyevsky Island territorial organisation. In 2002 he was elected as vice chairman for economic policy of Yabloko Saint Petersburg office. Simultaneously, Yevrayev was a member of expert council of Yabloko faction in the State Duma.

In 2000-2004 Mikhail Yevrayev worked in the Fund of Economic and Political Researches "EPITsentr", led by State Duma member Igor Artemyev. In EPITsentr Yevrayev led the department of social-economic programs, where he took part in development and implementation of anti-crisis programs in Artyom, Tomsk and Baltiysk. Mikhail Yevrayev also developed a platform for Artemyev's 2000 gubernatorial campaign in Saint Petersburg.

In March 2004 Igor Artemyev was appointed as Head of Federal Antimonopoly Service. Mikhail Yevrayev also joined FAS in April 2004, where he worked as Head of Department for Monitoring and Oversight in Real Estate, Local Monopolies, and Communal Utilities. In January 2007 Yevrayev was appointed as Head of Department for Monitoring of Government Contracting.

In 2006-2012 Mikhail Yevrayev was a member of the Federal Bureau of Yabloko.

On 11 October 2012 Mikhail Yevrayev was appointed as Deputy Minister of Regional Development of Russia, where he worked for just 2 months, as on 24 December 2012 he became Deputy Minister of Communications and Mass Media of Russia. In the Ministry of Communications Yevrayev oversaw the Russian Post and took part in creation of Post Bank, development of GIS ZhKKh, GIS "Independent Operator", register of national software, optimisation of departmental enterprises' procurement activities and drafting legislation in mobile number transfer between operators (MNP). On 24 July 2018 Yevrayev left the Ministry.

On 27 November 2018 Mikhail Yevrayev returned to the Federal Antimonopoly Service, where he was appointed as Deputy Head of FAS. In FAS Yevrayev oversaw government contracting, the division he worked in during 2007–2012. In November 2020 Igor Artemyev resigned as the Head of Federal Antimonopoly Service and was replaced by Maksim Shaskolsky. During cabinet reshuffle Mikhail Yevrayev resigned from the post of Deputy Head of FAS on 12 December 2012, at his own request.

Several staff appointments on 12 October 2021 resulted in Anatoly Seryshev becoming Presidential Envoy to the Siberian Federal District (the position was vacant since April 2021), while Seryshev's post as Assistant to the President was given to Yaroslavl Oblast Governor Dmitry Mironov. The vacated post of Governor of Yaroslavl Oblast was awarded to Mikhail Yevrayev, who graduated so called "school of governors" in 2019. (Note: a special administrative course for training of Presidential pool at the Russian Presidential Academy of National Economy and Public Administration)

== Personal life ==
Yevrayev is married and has a daughter and a son.

Among Mikhail Yevrayev's hobbies are chess, boxing and mountain skiing.

== Honours ==
- Medal of the Order "For Merit to the Fatherland" II class (2008)
- Letter of Gratitude of the Government of Russia (2011)
- Active State Advisor II class (2017)
