= Governor of Yaroslavl Oblast =

Highest-ranking official in Yaroslavl Oblast, Russia

- Seal of Governor of Yaroslavl Oblast

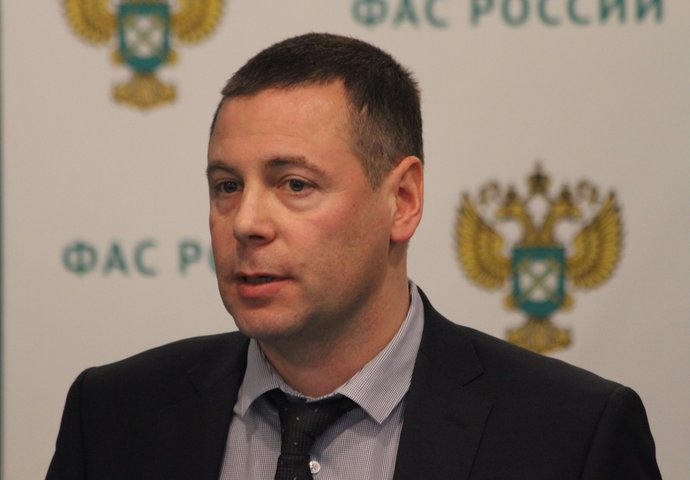
- Incumbent; Mikhail Yevrayev since 19 September 2022
- Status: Head of Federal Subject
- Seat: Yaroslavl
- Nominator: Political parties or self-nomination
- Term length: 5 years
- Formation: 1991
- First holder: Anatoly Lisitsyn
- Website: yarregion.ru

The Governor of Yaroslavl Oblast (Russian: Губернатор Ярославской области) is the highest official of Yaroslavl Oblast. The oblast government is headed by the chairman of the government of Yaroslavl Oblast, a post separated from that of the governor in 2012.

The position of governor was established on 3 December 1991. Currently the governor is elected by direct election for a five-year term.

The fourth governor Dmitry Mironov was elected in the elections on 10 September 2017.

== List of governors ==
No.	Portrait	Governor	Tenure	Time in office	Party	Election
—		Anatoly Lisitsyn (born 1947)	3 December 1991 – 10 September 1992	16 years, 16 days	Independent → United Russia	Acting
1		Anatoly Lisitsyn (born 1947)	10 September 1992 – 19 December 2007 (resigned)	16 years, 16 days	Independent → United Russia	Appointed 1995; 1999; 2003; 2006
—		Sergey Vakhrukov (born 1958)	19 December 2007 – 25 December 2007	4 years, 131 days	United Russia	Acting
2		Sergey Vakhrukov (born 1958)	25 December 2007 – 28 April 2012 (resigned)	4 years, 131 days	United Russia	2007
—		Sergey Yastrebov (born 1954)	28 April 2012 – 5 May 2012	4 years, 91 days	Independent	Acting
3		Sergey Yastrebov (born 1954)	5 May 2012 – 28 July 2016 (resigned)	4 years, 91 days	Independent	2012
—		Dmitry Mironov (born 1968)	28 July 2016 – 10 September 2017	5 years, 76 days	Independent	Acting
4		Dmitry Mironov (born 1968)	10 September 2017 – 12 October 2021 (resigned)	5 years, 76 days	Independent	2017
—		Mikhail Yevrayev (born 1971)	12 October 2021 – 19 September 2022	4 years, 330 days	Independent	Acting
5		Mikhail Yevrayev (born 1971)	19 September 2022 – present	4 years, 330 days	Independent	2022
