= Anatoly Seryshev =

Russian politician (born 1965)

- Анатолий Серышев
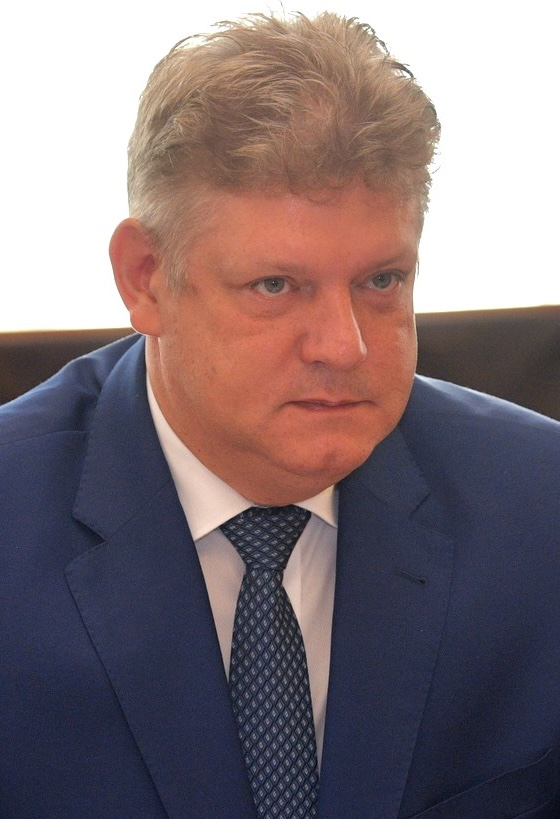
- Seryshev in 2019

6th Presidential Envoy to the Siberian Federal District
- Incumbent
- Assumed office 12 October 2021
- President: Vladimir Putin
- Preceded by: Sergey Menyaylo

Aide to the President of Russia
- In office 13 June 2018 – 12 October 2021
- President: Vladimir Putin
- Succeeded by: Dmitry Mironov

Deputy Director of the Federal Customs Service
- In office 2016–2018

Personal details
- Born: Anatoly Anatolyevich Seryshev; 19 July 1965 (age 61) Koblyakovo, Russian SFSR, Soviet Union

Anatoly Anatolyevich Seryshev (Russian: Анатолий Анатольевич Серышев; born 19 July 1965) is a Russian politician. He is currently the Presidential Envoy to the Siberian Federal District, incumbent since 12 October 2021.

Seryshev was previously an Aide to the President of Russia from 2018 to 2021.

== Biography ==
Anatoly Seryshev was born on 29 July 1965 in the village of Koblyakovo, Bratsky District, Irkutsk Oblast. In 1988, he graduated from the Irkutsk Institute of National Economy with a degree in economics. In 1990, he graduated from the Higher Courses of the KGB of the Soviet Union with a degree in officer with higher specialized education. From 1988 to 2016 he served in the security agencies.

Seryshev later held the position of Head of the Directorate of the Federal Security Service in the Republic of Karelia from 2011 to 2016, and the deputy director of the Federal Customs Service from 2016 to 2018. On 13 June 2018 he was appointed Aide to the President of Russia.

On 12 October 2021, Seryshev was appointed as the 6th Presidential Envoy to the Siberian Federal District.

== Income ==
According to the data posted in the declaration containing information on income, expenses, property and property obligations of persons holding government positions in Russia, in 2018, Seryshev earned 7,790,316 rubles. The income of his wife for the same period amounted to 3,198,924 rubles.

=== Sanctions ===
He was sanctioned by the UK government in 2022 in relation to the Russo-Ukrainian War.

In response to the 2022 Russian invasion of Ukraine, on 6 April 2022 the Office of Foreign Assets Control of the United States Department of the Treasury added Seryshev to its list of persons sanctioned pursuant to Executive Order 14024.
