= 2017 Yaroslavl Oblast gubernatorial election =

← 2003	10 September 2017	2022 →
- Turnout: 33.86%
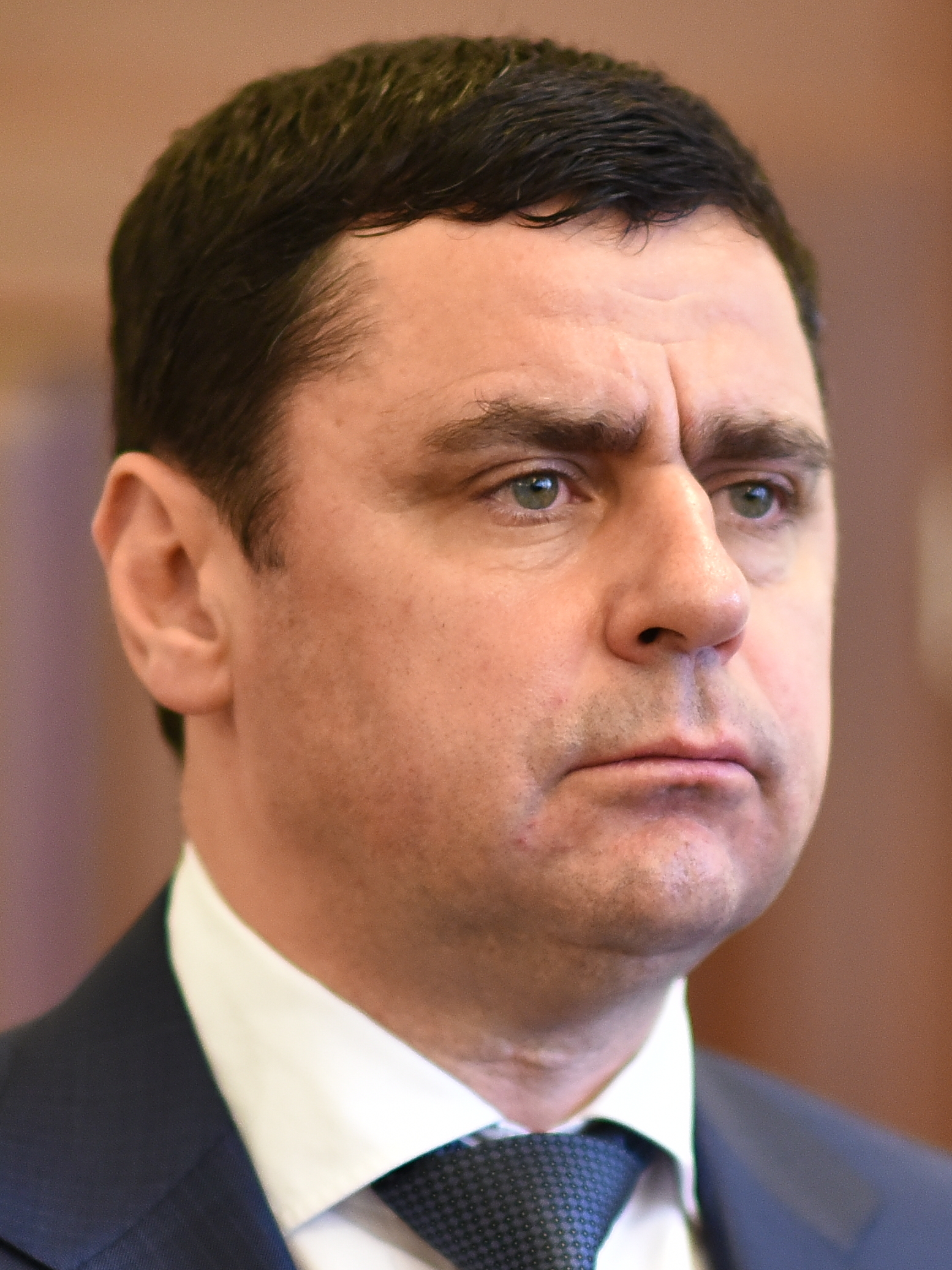
		CPRF	PARNAS
Nominee	Dmitry Mironov	Mikhail Paramonov	Sergey Balabayev
Party	United Russia	CPRF	People's Freedom Party
Popular vote	274,328	29,763	20,328
Percentage	79.32%	8.61%	5.88%
- 2017 Yaroslavl Oblast gubernatorial election results by municipality
Acting Governor before election
Dmitry Mironov
United Russia
Elected Governor
Dmitry Mironov
United Russia

The 2017 Gubernatorial Election in Yaroslavl Oblast was held on 10 September 2017.

== Background ==
28 July 2016, the Governor Sergey Yastrebov, went into early retirement. The acting Governor was appointed Dmitry Mironov.

== Candidates ==
=== Registered ===
Candidate	Party	Office	Candidates to the Federation Council
Sergey Balabayev; Born 1968 (age 45)	People's Freedom Party	Member of Yaroslavl Oblast Duma	Victor Tyabus; Lyubov Charkina; Sergey Skovorodkin
Andrey Vatlin; Born 1986 (age 31)	Liberal Democratic Party	Member of Board of representatives of Pereslavsky District	Yevgeniya Tishkovskaya; Yevgeny Mayne; Alexander Kovalev
Dmitry Mironov; Born 1968 (age 48)	United Russia	Incumbent acting Governor of Yaroslavl Oblast	Igor Ghahramanyan; Alexander Gribov; Alexander Rusakov
Kirill Panko; Born 1980 (age 37)	Communists of Russia	Unemployed	
Mikhail Paramonov; Born 1955 (age 61)	Communist Party	Member of Yaroslavl Oblast Duma	Alexander Vorobyov; Elkhan Madaliev; Yelena Kuznetsova

=== Not registered ===
- Oleg Vinogradov (Yabloko) — former Vice Governor of Yaroslavl Oblast.

== Opinion polls ==
Date	Poll source	Dmitry Mironov	Mikhail Paramonov	Sergey Balabayev	Andrey Vatlin	Kirill Panko	Other	Undecided	Abstention	Spoil the Ballot
10-20 August	WCIOM	55%	3%	2%	1%	0%	1%	24%	13%	1%

== Result ==
Candidate	Party	Votes	%
Dmitry Mironov	United Russia	274,328	79.32%%
Mikhail Paramonov	Communist Party	29,763	8.61%
Sergey Balabayev	People's Freedom Party	20,328	5.88%
Andrey Vatlin	Liberal Democratic Party	10,053	2.91%
Kirill Panko	Communists of Russia	7,966	1.23%
Invalid ballots		7,145	2.07%
Total		345,867	100%

== See also ==
- 2017 Russian gubernatorial elections
