= Russian competition law =

Antitrust law in Russia

Emblem of the Federal Antimonopoly Service, the premier antitrust body in Russia

Antitrust issues in Russia are regulated by one law: Federal Law No. 135-FZ, “On the Protection of Competition", which entered into force on 26 October 2006. The “3rd antimonopoly package”, which entered into force in January 2012, is indicative of a general trend of liberalization of antimonopoly regulation. Indeed, its stated aim was to bring Russia more in line with European competition regulations.

== History ==
Russian competition law was ratified by the Supreme Soviet of the USSR in March 1991. In the final stages of glasnost and the deteriorating tethering of the USSR, the various member soviet republics saw the need for regulation and stabilisation of trade. The representatives to the Supreme Soviet of the USSR ratified the Law on Competition and Limitation of Monopolistic Activity in Goods Market in March 1991 which became anti-monopoly policies within Russia after secession from the USSR. The Law on the Protection of Competition of 2006 is legislation pursued to translate those policies back into law.

== Federal Law No. 135-FZ ==
Federal Law No. 135-FZ, “On the Protection of Competition", was legislated on July 26, 2006, and entered into force on October 26, 2006.

=== Federal Antimonopoly Service ===
The law was "initiated and developed" by the Federal Antimonopoly Service of Russia (FAS) (Russian: Федеральная антимонопольная служба России, ФАС России), the federal-level executive governmental organ that controls the execution of antitrust and competition. Headed by Igor Artemyev, it had been established by the Decree of President of Russia №314 on March 9, 2004.

The law also gives the FAS authority over approval of company mergers stipulating various combinations of thresholds of assets of merging companies, an excess of which would require prior approval from the FAS. The scope of regulation of the FAS is focused on the commodity market and financial services with mandates over operations and transactions not just within the Russian Federation but also those taking place outside the boundaries of Russia which would have anti-competitive effects on the Russian market place. As with the trend in the United States and the European Union, the FAS has also taken Microsoft to task for anti-competitive behaviour by bringing Microsoft to court on 4 June 2009. In 2021, the FAS fined search engine corporation Google for allegedly violating Russian advertising law.

=== Dominance ===
Beyond western European competition laws against dominance, the Competition Law in Russia expressly presumes the existence of dominance by defining thresholds.

- A company is "presumed dominant" if it has more than 50% of market share
- Dominance must be established by FAS if a company has more than 35% of market share
- A company with less than 35% of market share is generally not considered dominant unless FAS establishes a case for dominance based on factors like analyses of competition on the market and stability of market share
- Collective dominance exists if the market share of each entity exceeds 8% and the aggregate market share:
  - Exceeds 50% for not more than 3 entities
  - Exceeds 75% for not more than 5 entities
- A safe harbour margin of up to 20% market share per company for agreements between companies of different segments of a supply chain

=== Other provisions ===
The law also places restrictions on aids from, and public procurement policies of, federal, provincial, or municipal governments that otherwise would encourage anti-competition.

In addition to a distinct competition law, the Code of Administrative Offences has also been amended to increase liability of anti-competitive practices. Punitive measures against anti-competitive practices are meted out in terms of percentages of revenues of a company. Company directors can be criminally liable in cases of a repeated abuse—e.g., establishing high monopoly or low monopoly prices, unjustified evasion from the execution of contracts with individual customers, creation of obstacles for other entities entering the market—and can be sentenced to up to 7 years in prison.

== See also ==
- Copyright in Russia
- Federal Antimonopoly Service of Russia
- Law of the Russian Federation
