= Yuri Ushakov =

Russian diplomat (born 1947)

- Юрий Ушаков
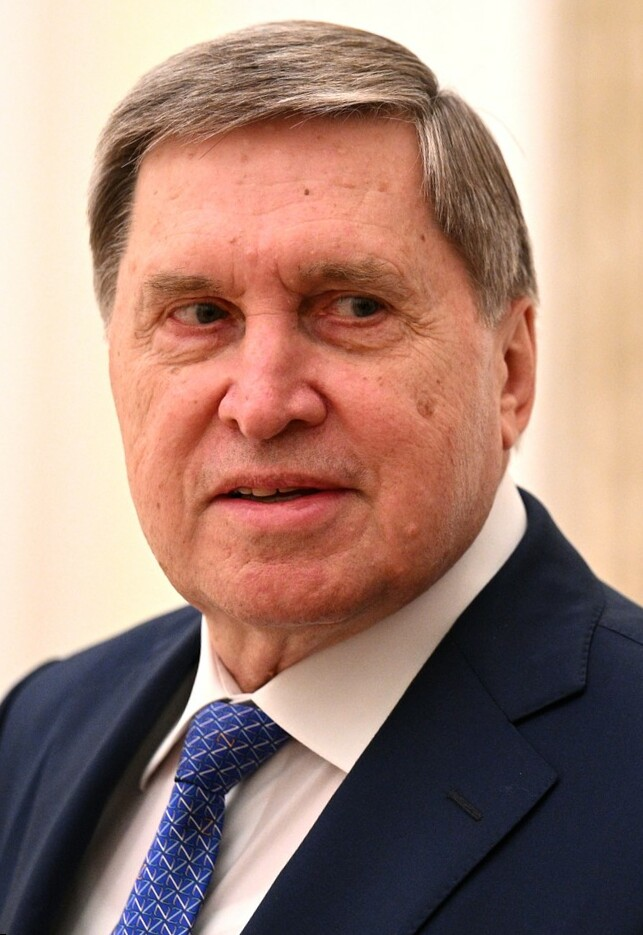
- Ushakov in 2023

Aide to the President of Russia
- Incumbent
- Assumed office 21 May 2012
- President: Vladimir Putin
- Preceded by: Sergey Prikhodko

Ambassador of Russia to the United States
- In office 22 January 1999 – 31 May 2008
- President: Boris Yeltsin; Vladimir Putin; Dmitry Medvedev
- Preceded by: Yuli Vorontsov
- Succeeded by: Sergey Kislyak

Deputy Minister of Foreign Affairs
- In office 28 January 1998 – 2 March 1999
- Minister: Yevgeny Primakov; Igor Ivanov
- Preceded by: Vasily Sidorov
- Succeeded by: Sergei Ordzhonikidze

Personal details
- Born: 13 March 1947 (age 79) Moscow, Soviet Union
- Citizenship: Soviet Union (1947–1991); Russia (from 1991)
- Children: 1
- Education: Moscow State Institute of International Relations; Diplomatic Academy of the Ministry of Foreign Affairs of the Soviet Union
- Occupation: Diplomat

Yuri Viktorovich Ushakov (Russian: Юрий Викторович Ушаков; born 13 March 1947) is a Russian senior diplomat who has served as the Aide to the President of Russia on foreign policy issues since 2012. From 1998 to 2008, he was the Russian ambassador to the United States. He has the federal state civilian service rank of 1st class Active State Councillor of the Russian Federation.

== Early career ==
Ushakov is a graduate of Moscow State Institute of International Relations (MGIMO) and entered the service of the Soviet Ministry of Foreign Affairs in 1970. In the same year he was sent to the Soviet Embassy, Copenhagen. Returning to Moscow, he worked in the Department of the Scandinavian Countries, in the General Secretariat. He completed advanced training courses at the Diplomatic Academy, defended his Candidate of Sciences (Ph.D. equal) thesis on the foreign policy of the countries of Northern Europe.

From 1986 to 1992, he was Counsellor-Envoy of the Embassy of the Soviet Union and then Russia in Denmark. From 1992 to 1996, he headed the Department of European Cooperation of the Russian Foreign Ministry. He was the Russian Ambassador to the Organization for Security and Co-operation in Europe (OSCE) from 1996 to 1998. From January 1998 to March 1999, he was the Deputy Foreign Minister for cooperation with the United Nations, legal and humanitarian issues.

== Envoy to Washington ==
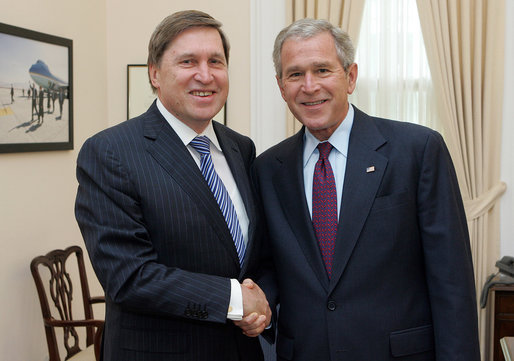
Ushakov with the US President George W. Bush, 6 June 2008

He was appointed Russia's ambassador to the United States and permanent observer to the Organization of American States in December 1998.

He commented on the Beslan school massacre in North Ossetia-Alania, Russia:

It is already clear that terrorists will never stop killing us if they are not stopped and eliminated with all the power and might of our nation and that of the civilized world.

He served until President Dmitry Medvedev replaced him with Sergey Kislyak on 31 May 2008.

== In government ==
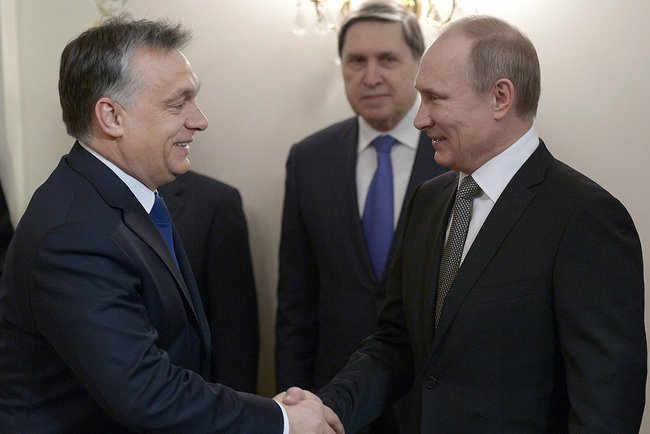
Ushakov and Putin welcoming Hungarian Prime Minister Viktor Orbán in Moscow, Russia, 14 January 2014

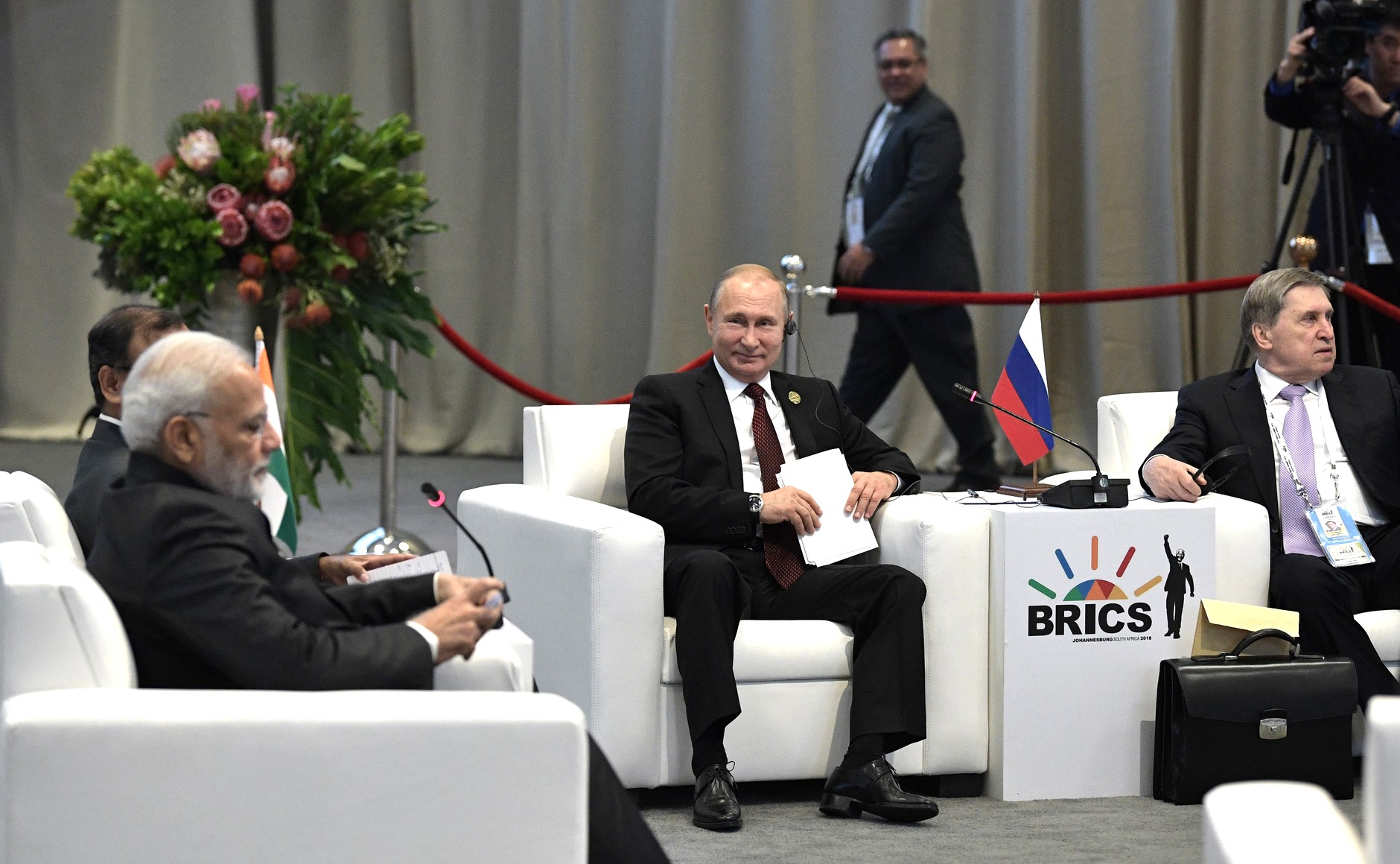
Ushakov with Putin and Indian Prime Minister Narendra Modi at the 10th BRICS summit in Johannesburg, South Africa, 27 July 2018

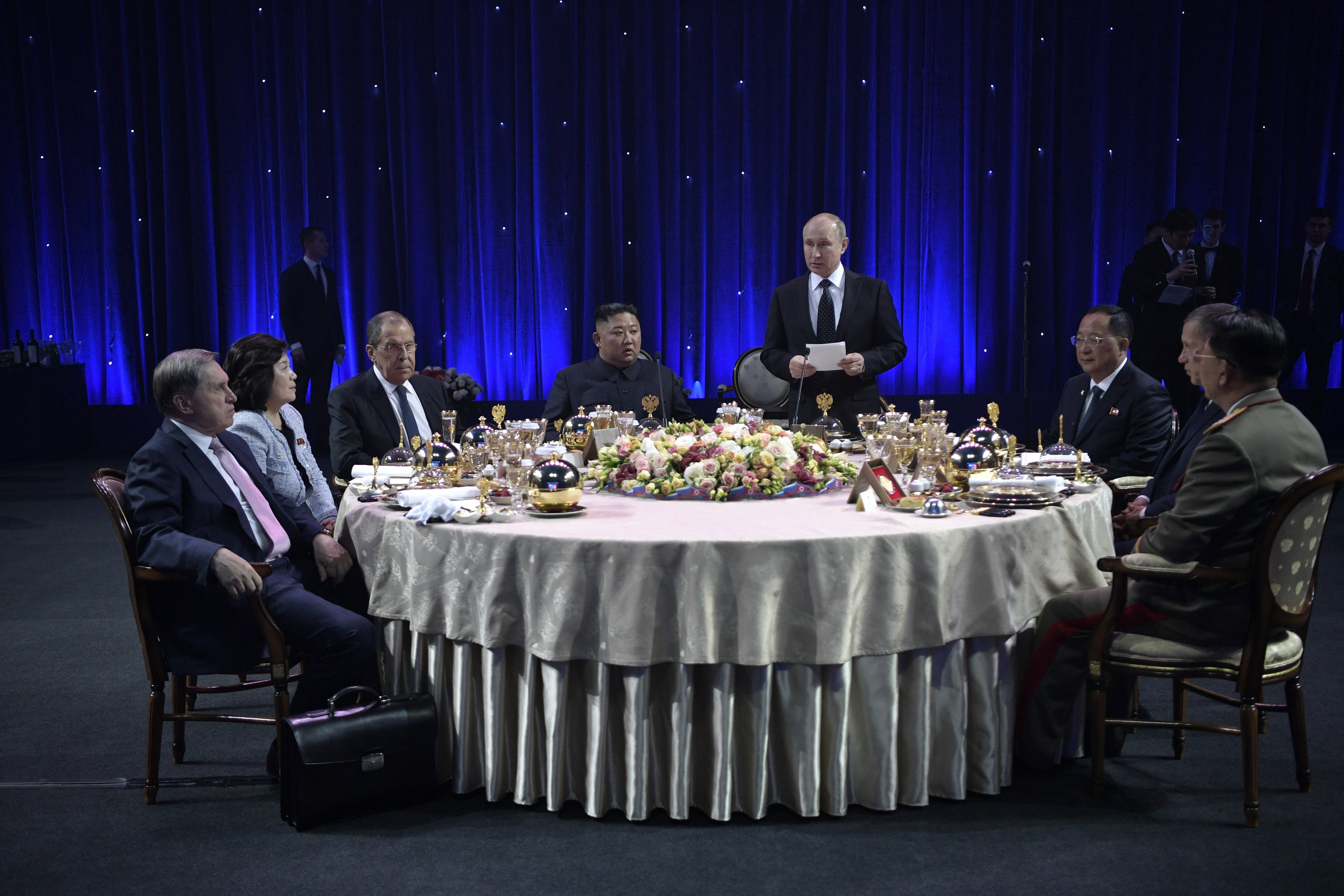
Ushakov (left) with Putin and North Korean Supreme Leader Kim Jong Un in Vladivostok, Russia, 25 April 2019

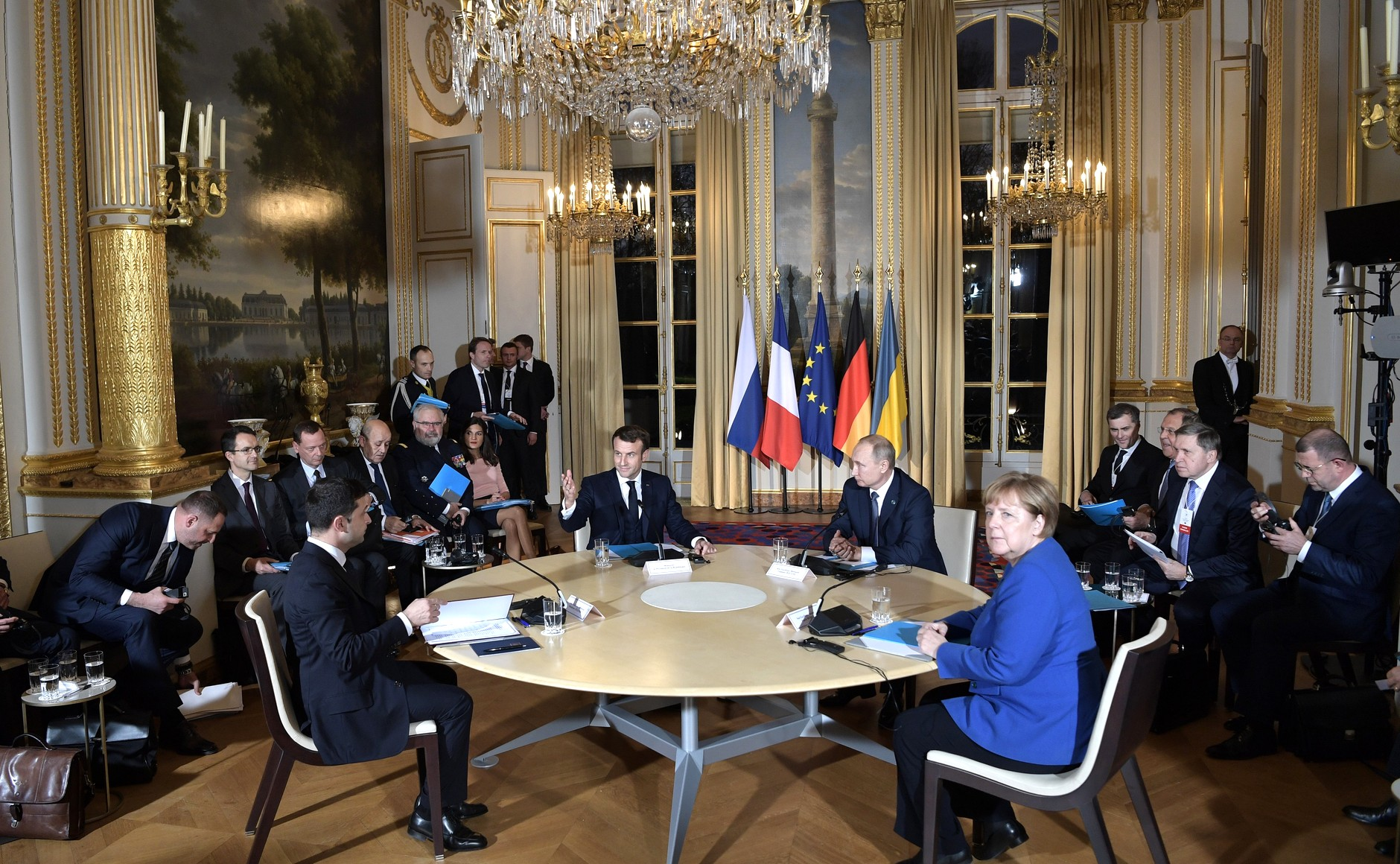
The October 2019 "Normandy Format" talks in Paris, France where Ushakov sits aside Sergey Lavrov

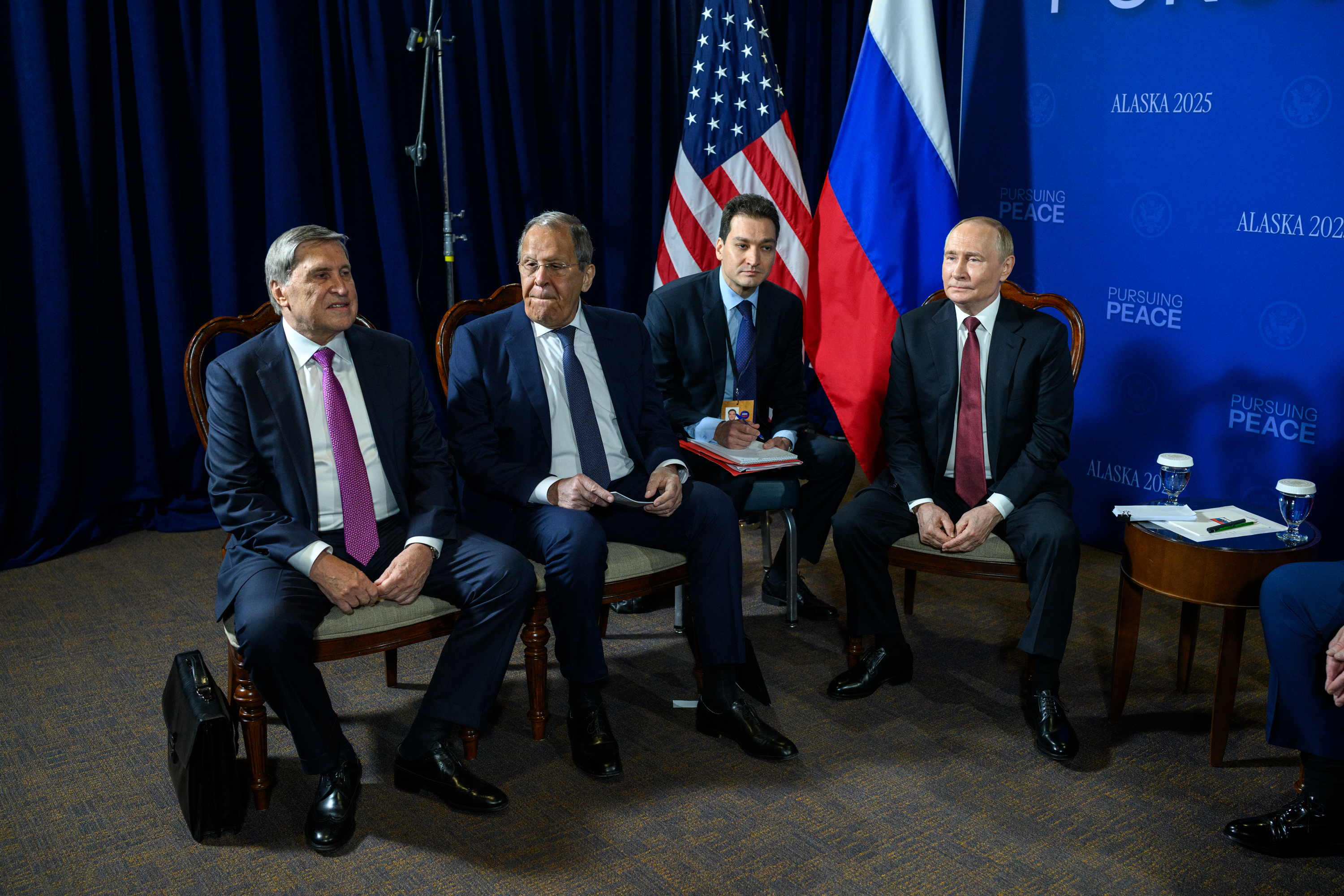
Ushakov, Lavrov and Putin during the 2025 Russia–United States Summit in Anchorage, Alaska, 15 August 2025

From June 2008 to May 2012 Ushakov was Deputy Chief of Staff of the Russian government. Since May 2012 he has been Aide to the President of Russia responsible for international affairs in the Presidential Administration.

In June 2019, Ushakov said that Russian President Vladimir Putin and Chinese President Xi Jinping would sign a new declaration on their "global partnership and strategic cooperation, which are entering a new era", saying that "the positions of Russia and China are very close or coincide completely on most international issues."

In February 2022, he dismissed US warnings that Russia was planning to invade Ukraine, saying: "We don't understand why they are spreading clearly false information about Russian intentions."

In July 2023, Ushakov told Russian media that 49 out of 54 African states had confirmed the participation of their delegations at the 2023 Russia–Africa Summit in St. Petersburg.

== Personal life ==
Ushakov's family consists of him, his wife, and a daughter. According to his income declaration, Ushakov earned 8,736,043 rubles in 2018, while his spouse earned 214,527 rubles during the same period. In 2022, an investigation by the "Metla" publication revealed that the Ushakov family owned real estate valued at over 700 million rubles. Additionally, Yuri Ushakov is fluent in English and Danish.

== Honors ==
=== Russian honors ===
- Badge of the Ministry of Foreign Affairs "For Contribution to International Cooperation" (2017)
- Medal "For Contribution to the Creation of the Eurasian Economic Union" 1st class (2015)
- Order of Seraphim of Sarov, 2nd class (2013)
- Order of Friendship (2008)
- Order of Merit for the Fatherland, 4th class (2007)
- Honored Worker of the Diplomatic Service of the Russian Federation (2006)
- Medal of the Order of Honour (2004)
- Medal of the Order "For Merit to the Fatherland", 2nd class (1996)
- Honorary Worker of the Ministry of Foreign Affairs of the Russian Federation

=== Foreign honours ===
- Order of Manas, 3rd class (Kyrgyzstan, 2017)
- Order of Friendship, 2nd class (Kazakhstan, 2019)
- Order of the Serbian Flag, 2nd class (Serbia, 2019)

=== Diplomatic rank ===
- Extraordinary and Plenipotentiary Ambassador, 1st Class (March 18, 1992)
- Extraordinary and Plenipotentiary Ambassador (November 10, 1995)

Diplomatic posts
Preceded by Yuli Vorontsov	Russian Ambassador to the United States; 22 January 1999 – 31 May 2008	Succeeded by Sergey Kislyak
