= Sergey Vakhrukov =

Russian politician

- Сергей Вахруков
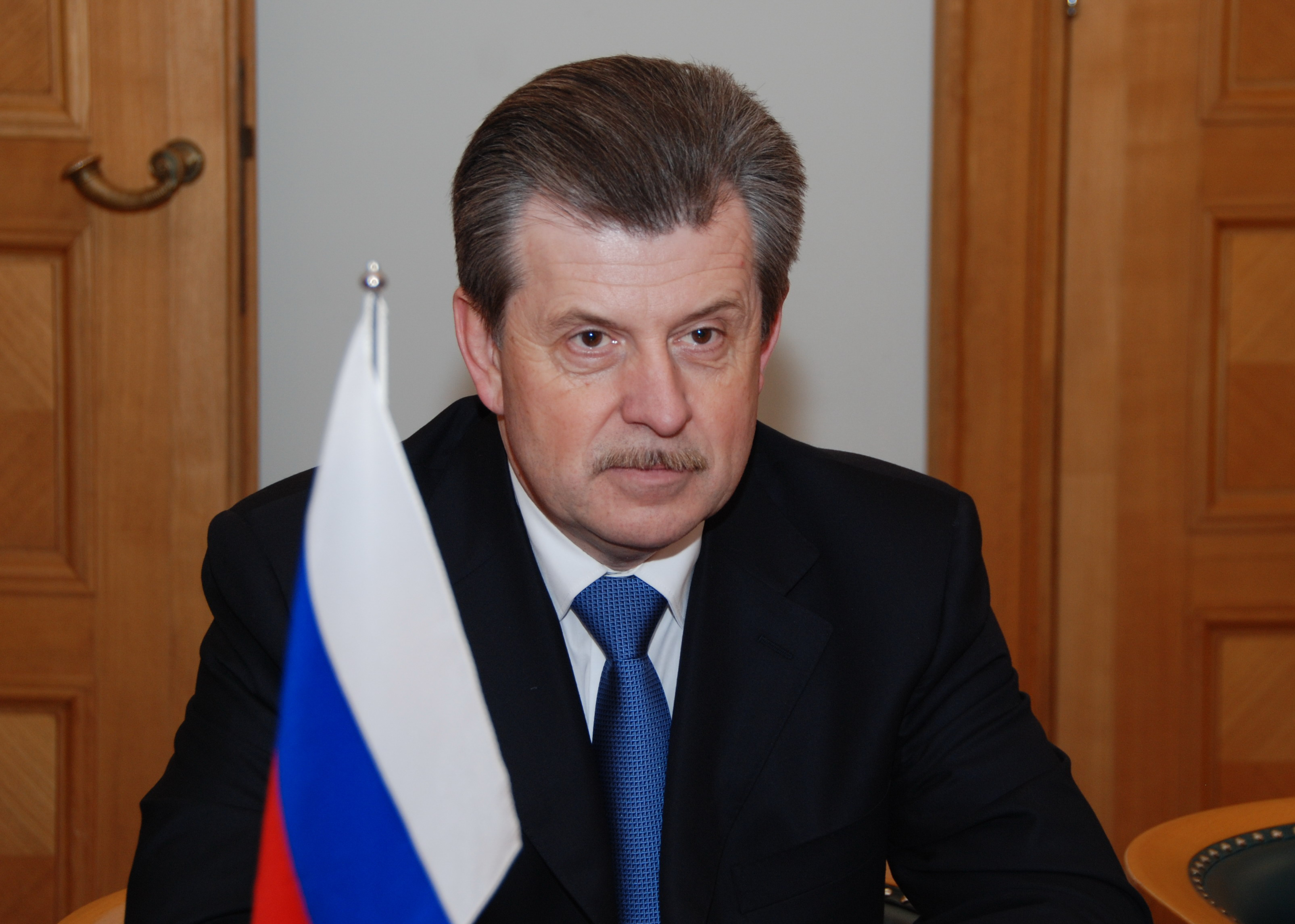
- Vakhrukov in 2011

2nd Governor of Yaroslavl Oblast
- In office 25 December 2007 – 28 April 2012
- Preceded by: Anatoly Lisitsyn
- Succeeded by: Sergey Yastrebov

Chairman of the State Duma of Yaroslavl Oblast
- In office 26 March 1996 – 25 April 2000
- Preceded by: Valentin Melekhin
- Succeeded by: Andrey Krutikov

Personal details
- Born: June 20, 1958 (age 67) Rybinsk, RSFSR, Soviet Union

Sergey Alexeyevich Vakhrukov (Russian: Сергей Алексеевич Вахруков, born 20 June 1958) is a Russian politician, and is a former governor of Yaroslavl Oblast (2007-2012).

On 25 December 2007, Vakhrukov was appointed to the position of governor by Russian president Vladimir Putin. His tenure ended on 25 August 2012, and Sergey Yastrubov succeeded him beginning 28 August 2012. Yastrubov's term of governorship ended on 28 July 2016, and he was followed by Dmitry Mironov, who entered office on the same day.
