= Ruslan Edelgeriev =

Russian politician (born 1974)

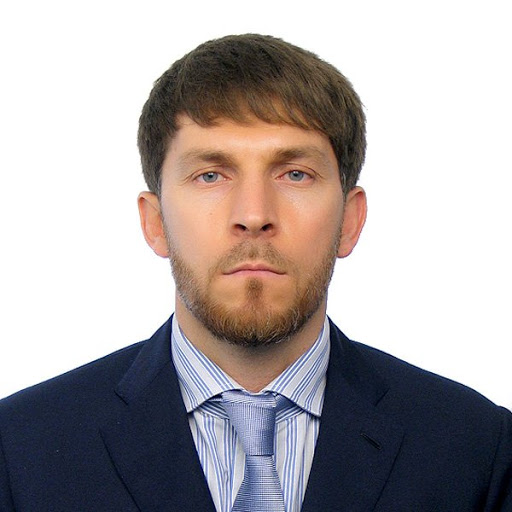
Official Kremlin portrait, 2020

Ruslan Abubakar Said-Khusainovich Edelgeriev (Russian: Русла́н Абубакар Сайд-Хуса́йнович Эдельгери́ев; born 4 December 1974) is a Russian politician, currently serving as Aide to the President of Russia since 14 May 2024.

Edelgeriev has also served as Presidential Advisor on Climate Change and as Chairman of the Government of the Chechen Republic from 24 May 2012 to 25 June 2018. Edelgeriev is a member of United Russia, serving as Secretary of the Chechen Regional Office from July 2012 to December 2019.

== Biography ==
Edelgeriev was born on 4 December 1974 in Akhmat-Yurt in Checheno-Ingush Autonomous Soviet Socialist Republic. Edelgeriev's mother, Vera Afanasievna Deryabina, was a school teacher of Ramzan Kadyrov, head of the Chechnya. Edelgeriev served in the Russian Armed Forces from 1992 to 1994.

From April 1994 to February 2004, Edelgeriev served in the Russian Interior Ministry in Slavyansk-na-Kubani. In 2002, Edelgeriev graduated from the Krasnodar Law Institute with a degree in jurisprudence. From February 2004 to May 2007, Edelgriev served as a police officer in Kurchaloyevsky District of Chechnya.

Edelgeriev entered politics in 2007, serving as First Deputy Minister of Agriculture of the Chechen Republic (December 2007 - January 2008) before becoming Minister of Agriculture in January 2008. Edelgeriev served in the agriculture ministerial role until 24 May 2012, when he was promoted to Prime Minister of the Chechen Republic.

Since 22 June 2018, Edelgeriev has served as Adviser to the President of the Russian Federation of climate change issues. On 18 July 2018, Edelgeriev was made Special Representative of the President of the Russian Federation on climate issues.
