= Larisa Brychyova =

Russian jurist and politician

- Лариса Брычёва
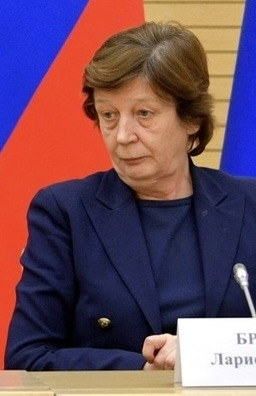
- Brychyova in 2020

Aide to the President of Russia
- Incumbent
- Assumed office 27 March 2004
- President: Vladimir Putin; Dmitry Medvedev

Head of the Presidential State-Legal Directorate
- Incumbent
- Assumed office 12 May 1999
- President: Boris Yeltsin; Vladimir Putin; Dmitry Medvedev
- Preceded by: Ruslan Orekhov

Personal details
- Born: 26 May 1957 (age 69) Moscow, Russian SFSR, Soviet Union
- Education: Moscow State University (1981); Institute of State and Law (1985)
- Awards: Honoured Lawyer of Russia

Larisa Igorevna Brychyova (Russian: Лариса Игоревна Брычёва; born 26 May 1957) is a Russian jurist and politician. She is Aide to the President of Russia and head of the Presidential State-Legal Directorate. She has the federal state civilian service rank of 1st class Active State Councillor of the Russian Federation.

== Biography ==
Born on May 26, 1957, in Moscow.

Graduated from the law faculty of Moscow State University in 1981, and completed post-graduate studies at the Institute of State and Law of the USSR Academy of Sciences in 1985. Holds a PhD in law. Honoured Lawyer of the Russian Federation.

She began working in 1974 as a consultant at the State Arbitration court at the Moscow Oblast Executive Committee, and later as a legal consultant and senior legal consultant at a number of Moscow enterprises and organizations.

1985–1987: Research assistant at the Institute of State and Law of the USSR Academy of Sciences.

1987–1992: Department Editor; Deputy Editor of the magazine "Soviet State and Law".

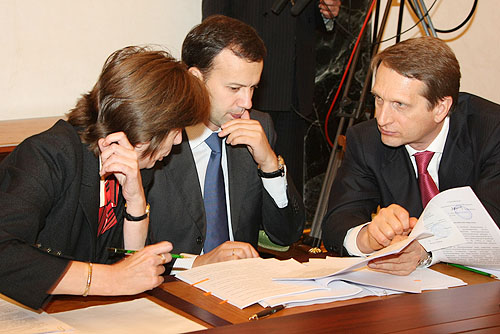
Larisa Brychyova consults with Arkady Dvorkovich and Sergei Naryshkin at a meeting of the "Anti-Corruption Council" 2008.

1992–1993: Head specialist of the Legislation Committee of the Supreme Soviet of Russia; sector head of the Commission of the Republic Council on economic reform of the Supreme Council of the Russian Federation.

1993-1999: Occupied important state positions of state service of the Russian Federation: Head of department in the Russian Federation Presidential Executive Office; Head of Staff of the Presidential Plenipotentiary in the Federal Assembly; Deputy Head of the Main State Legal Department of the President of the Russian Federation.

In 1999, she was appointed Head of the Main State Legal Department of the President of the Russian Federation.

In March 2004, she was appointed Aide to the President, and Head of the State Legal Directorate in the Presidential Executive Office.

=== Sanctions ===
She was sanctioned by the UK government in 2023 in relation to the Russo-Ukrainian War.

== Sources ==
- Official biography

This article incorporates material from the website of the President of Russia and is used under the Creative Commons and Attribution 4.0 International , 8 April 2015 - on Attribution 3.0 Unported Licence.
