= Koblyakovo =

Koblyakovo Кобляково
- Village
- Location within Irkutsk Oblast Location within Russia
- Coordinates: 56°35′N 101°26′E
- Country: Russia
- Region: Irkutsk Oblast
- District: Bratsky District
- Time zone: UTC+8:00

Koblyakovo (Russian: Кобляково) is a rural locality (a selo) in Bratsky District, Irkutsk Oblast, Russia. Population: 788 (2010 census);

== Geography ==
This rural locality is located 50 kilometres (31 mi) from Bratsk (the district's administrative centre), 509 kilometres (316 mi) from Irkutsk (capital of Irkutsk Oblast) and 3,909 kilometres (2,429 mi) from Moscow. Sakhorovo is the nearest rural locality.
