= Aide to the President of Russia =

Aide to the President of the Russian Federation (Russian: Помощник президента Российской Федерации) is an official in the Presidential Executive Office appointed by the President of Russia with the responsibility to aid him as a personal assistant. Senior staff within the Presidential Executive Office have the rank of aide to the president alongside specific area of responsibility, and the number of aides is determined by the President of Russia. Since December 1991, more than 40 assistants have been appointed. Their functions are among other things to:

- Prepare proposals for the President on the implementation of his powers.
- Prepare analytical, reference, and informational materials for the President.
- Prepare proposals for long-term and current work plans of the President.
- Prepare draft instructions and implement individual instructions of the President.

The position was created by the order of President Boris Yeltsin on May 8, 1992. Viktor Ilyushin was the inaugural Aide to the President, serving as "First Assistant to the President".

== Current aides to the President of Russia ==
Photo	Name	Term Start	Area(s) of responsibility and other roles
	Larisa Brychyova	27 March 2004	Head of the Presidential State-Legal Directorate of the President
	Aleksey Dyumin	14 May 2024	Defense Industry and Sports Secretary of the State Council of the Russian Federation
	Dmitry Kalimulin	13 June 2018	Head of the Presidential Speechwriting Office
	Vladimir Medinsky	24 January 2020	Culture and Historical Heritage Chairman of the Union of Writers of Russia
	Dmitry Mironov	12 October 2021	Civil Service and Personnel Policy
	Nikolai Patrushev	14 May 2024	Shipbuilding and Maritime Policy Chairman of the Maritime Collegium of Russia
	Yuri Ushakov	21 May 2012	Foreign Policy Issues
	Andrei Fursenko	21 May 2012	Scientific and Educational Policy
	Dmitry Shalkov	13 June 2018	Head of the Control Directorate of the President
	Ruslan Edelgeriev	14 May 2024	Climate Change Issues

The last appointments and reappointments took place on May 14, 2024 following the Fifth inauguration of Vladimir Putin and alongside the formation of Mikhail Mishustin's Second Cabinet.
