= Sergey Yastrebov =

Russian politician

- Сергей Ястребов
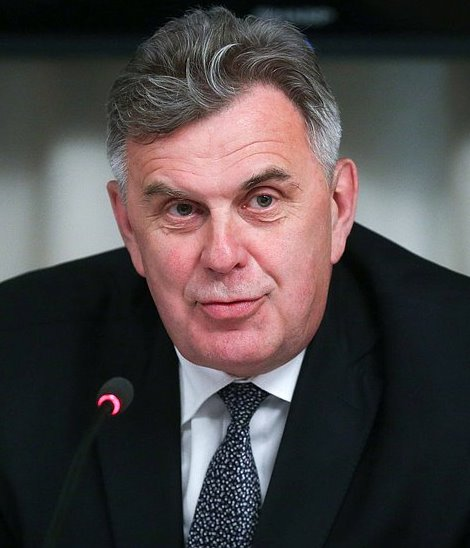
- Yastrebov in 2019

Deputy Minister of Natural Resources and Environment of Russia
- In office 23 January 2017 – 1 June 2022

3rd Governor of Yaroslavl Oblast
- In office 28 April 2012 – 28 July 2017
- Preceded by: Sergey Vakhrukov
- Succeeded by: Dmitry Mironov

Personal details
- Born: Sergey Nikolayevich Yastrebov; 30 June 1954 (age 72) Shcherbakov, Russia, Soviet Union
- Party: Independent
- Education: Rybinsk Aviation Technological Institute
- Awards: Order of Honour

Sergey Nikolayevich Yastrebov (Russian: Сергей Николаевич Ястребов; born 30 June 1954), is a Russian politician, who is last served as the Deputy Minister of Natural Resources and Environment of the Russia from 2017 to 2022. He served as the 3rd Governor of the Yaroslavl Oblast from 2012 to 2016.

== Biography ==
Sergey Yastrebov was born on 30 June 1954.

In 1976, he graduated from the Rybinsk Aviation Technological Institute, after which he worked at the Stupino Metallurgical Plant in Moscow Oblast. After serving in the army in 1978, he got a job at the Rybinsk motor production association, where he worked first as a designer, then as a senior engineer and secretary of the Komsomol committee.

In 1982, he moved to work in the Rybinsk city committee of the Komsomol, where he first held the post of second and then first secretary. From 1985 to 1988, he was the Second Secretary of the Yaroslavl Regional Committee of the Komsomol. From 1988 to 1990, he was the Second Secretary of the Frunzensky District Committee of the CPSU in Yaroslavl. From 1990 1992, he was the Chairman of the Frunzensky District Executive Committee of Yaroslavl. From 1992 to 1998, he was the Head of the Administration of the Frunzensky District of Yaroslavl. From June 1998 to April 2004, he was head of the administration of the Kirovsky district of the city of Yaroslavl.

In April 2004, Yatsrebov was transferred to work in the city administration as the first deputy mayor of Yaroslavl for urban issues. In June 2007, he was transferred to the post of first deputy mayor for the implementation of projects and programs for the 1000th anniversary of the city, and in January 2009 - to the position of first deputy for social and economic development and the 1000th anniversary of the city, and from January 2011 - to the position First Deputy for Social and Economic Development of the city. Since September 2011, the position held by Yastrebov is called the first deputy mayor of Yaroslavl for urban planning and socio-economic development of the city.

In December 2011, primaries of candidates from the United Russia party for the post of mayor of Yaroslavl, Yastrebov won, but he did not take part in the elections. as Governor of Yaroslavl Oblast, Sergey Vakhrukov made a bet on businessman Yakov Yakushev, who lost the election to opposition candidate Yevgeny Urlashov. Russian President Dmitry Medvedev noted on 27 April 2012 that such a situation, when one person wins the primaries and another is sent to the polls, is "unacceptable".

On 19 March 2012, Yastrebov was appointed Deputy Governor of Yaroslavl Oblast. Yastrebov's powers included coordination of the activities of the regional state bodies, structural units of the regional government apparatus responsible for the implementation of state policy in the field of local self-government, state orders, interaction with compatriots, implementation of state policy in the field of migration. Yastrebov was also functionally subordinate to the local government department and the regional department of state order.

On 28 April 2012, by the Decree of the President of the Russian Federation, Yastrbov was appointed Acting Governor of Yaroslavl Oblast to replace Vakhrukov, who had retired.

On 4 May 2012, Medvedev submitted Yastrebov's candidacy to the Yaroslavl Oblast Duma for his approval as governor of the Yaroslavl Oblast.

On 5 May, the Yaroslavl Oblast Duma approved Yastrebov as the governor of the Yaroslavl Oblast.

On 28 July 2016, he voluntarily resigned from the post of governor.

On 23 January 2017, Yastrebov was appointed Deputy Minister of Natural Resources of the Russian Federation.
