= Igor Artemyev =

Russian politician and government official (born 1961)

- Игорь Артемьев
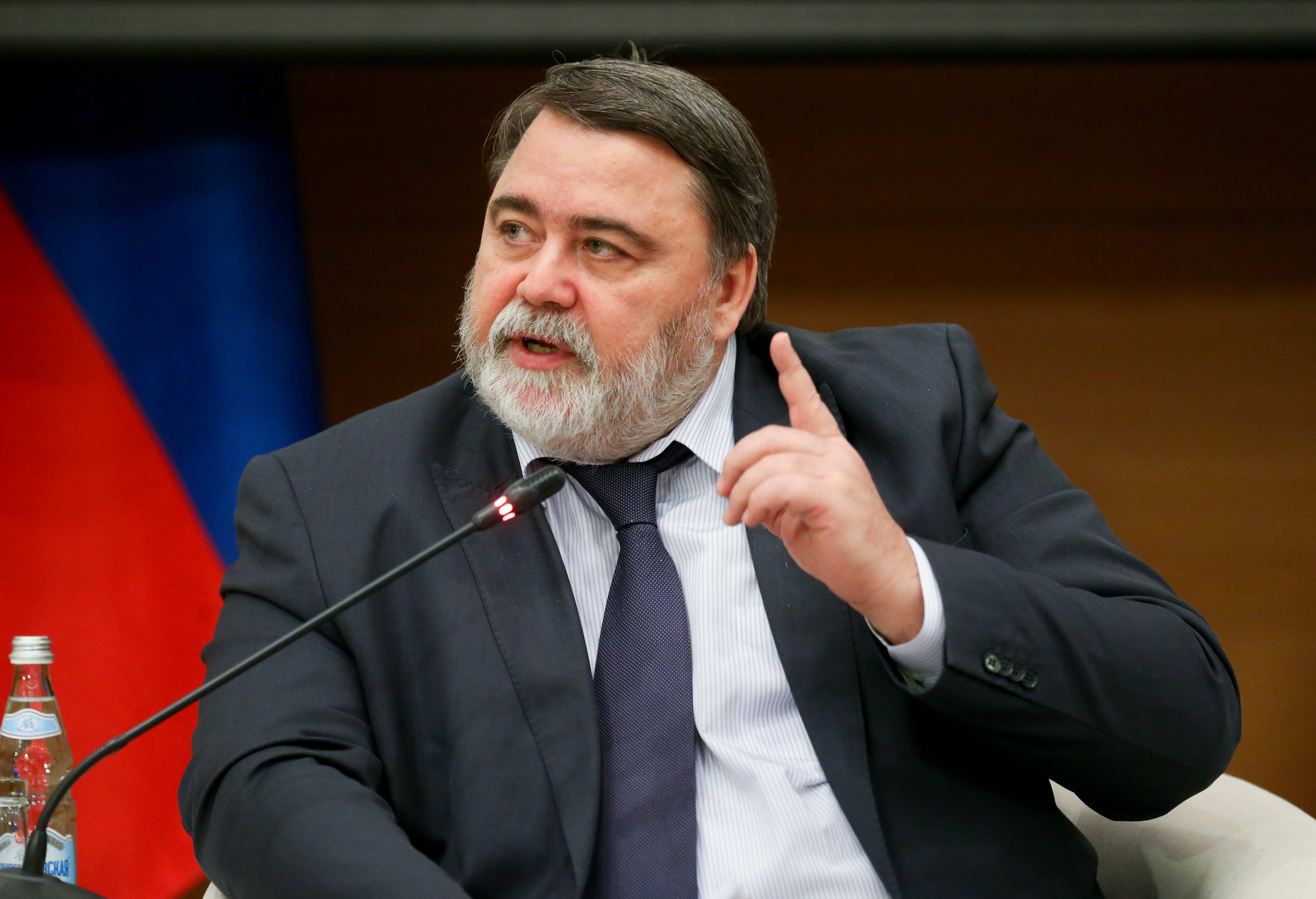
- Artemyev in 2018

Head of the Federal Antimonopoly Service of Russia
- In office 10 March 2004 – 11 November 2020
- Succeeded by: Maksim Shaskolsky

Personal details
- Born: 27 November 1961 (age 64) Leningrad, Soviet Union (now Russia)

Igor Yurievich Artemyev (Russian: Игорь Юрьевич Артемьев; born 27 November 1961) is a Russian politician and government official. He has the federal state civilian service rank of 1st class Active State Councillor of the Russian Federation.

== Biography ==
Artemyev graduated from the Leningrad State University Faculty of Biology and from the Faculty of Law of the St. Petersburg State University. According to former opposition leader Marina Salye, Artemyev worked for the KGB during the Soviet era.

On 10 March 2004, Artemyev was appointed the head of the Federal Antimonopoly Service of Russia (FAS) by President Vladimir Putin through presidential decree No. 329-р. He served in this role for 16 years, retiring in 2020. Artemyev was replaced in this capacity by Maksim Shaskolsky, the former vice governor of Saint Petersburg.

After this, Artemyev became an assistant to Russian prime minister Mikhail Mishustin. He worked in this position until the fall of 2023. In November, he resigned of his own free will, after which he took over as head of Saint-Petersburg International Mercantile Exchange.
