= Federal Antimonopoly Service =

Russian government organization

Federal Antimonopoly Service of Russia
- Федеральная Антимонопольная Служба Российской Федерации
- Emblem of Federal Antimonopoly Service

- Flag of Federal Antimonopoly Service

Agency overview
- Formed: March 9, 2004
- Employees: 864 (central office), 2572 (territorial bodies)
- Agency executive: Maxim Shaskolsky
- Website: fas.gov.ru
- Building details
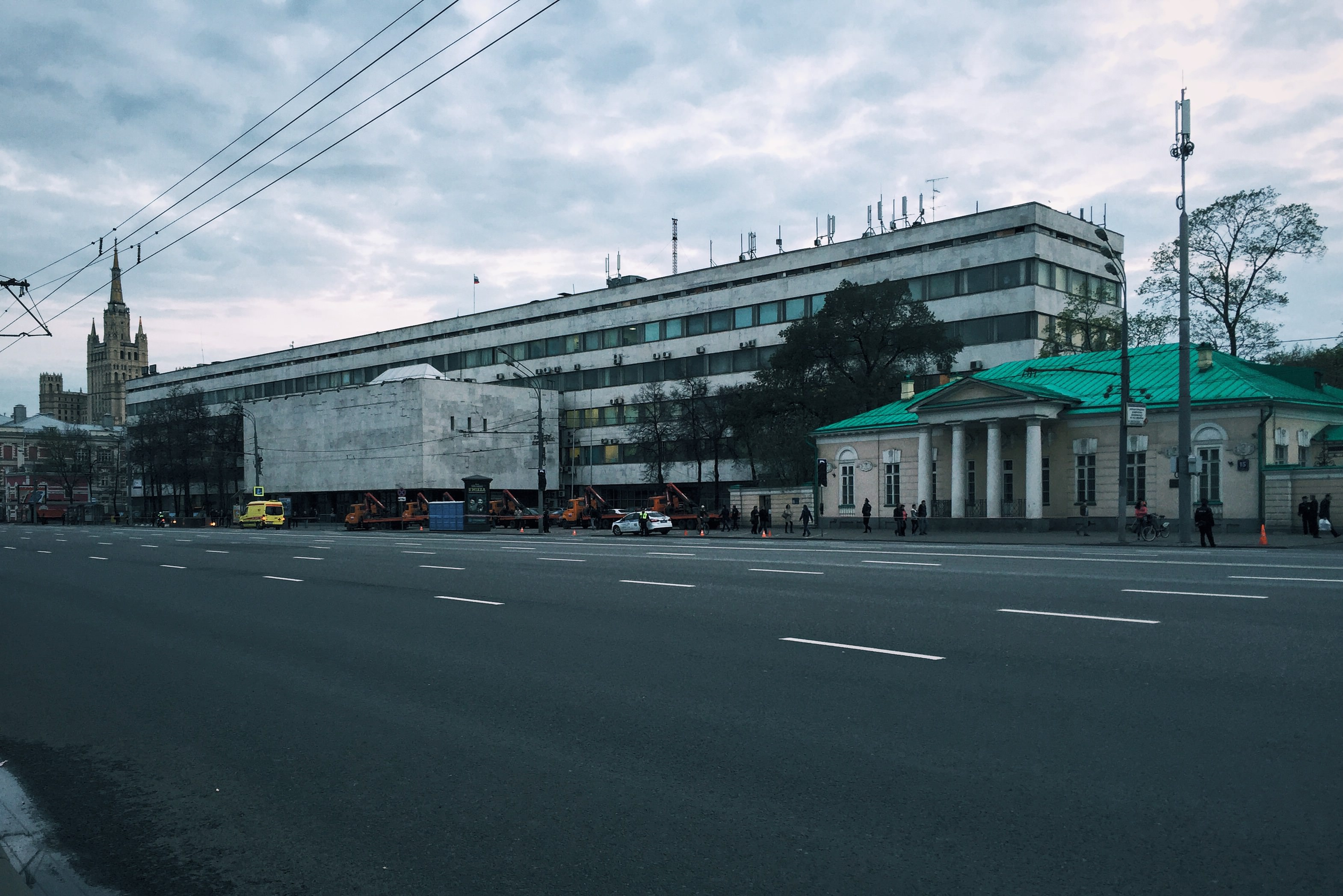
- Headquarters of the service

The Federal Antimonopoly Service of Russia (FAS) (Russian: Федеральная антимонопольная служба России, ФАС России) is the federal-level executive governmental organ that controls the execution of the antitrust law and related areas.

The FAS was established by President Vladimir Putin through Decree #314, which was issued on March 9, 2004. The agency was led from its inception in 2004 to 2020 by Igor Artemiev. He has since been replaced in this capacity by Maksim Shaskolsky, the former vice governor of Saint Petersburg.

== History ==
The predecessor of the Federal Antimonopoly Service is the RSFSR State Committee on Antimonopoly Policy and Support for New Economic Structures, formed in accordance with the RSFSR Law of July 14, 1990 “On Republican Ministries and State Committees of the RSFSR”. Valery Chernogorodsky was appointed Chairman of the Committee. The staff of the apparatus was determined to be 150 units in accordance with the Provisional Regulation on the Civil Code of Russia was introduced, which was approved by Resolution of the Council of Ministers of the RSFSR of September 10, 1990 No. 344.

In July 2015, on a proposal of the Prime Minister of Russia Dmitry Medvedev, President Vladimir Putin approved the merger of the Federal Tariffs Service with the FAS Russia, adding thus to the competences of the latter mandate with price and tariff regulation, regulation of electricity tariffs, gas prices and certain other tariffs and some functions of natural monopoly regulation.

== Organization ==
Among the departments of the FAS Central authority there are:

- Department for Control over Construction and Natural Resources
- Department for Industry Control
- Department for Regulation over Electric Power Industry
- Department for Regulation of Telecommunications and Information Technologies
- Department for Control over Financial Markets
- Department for Control over Advertising and Unfair Competition
- Department for Control over Foreign Investment
- Anti-Cartel Department
- Department for Control over Army and Naval Armaments, Military Communications Equipment
- and others

== International cooperation ==
The FAS of Russia cooperates with international organizations and foreign authorities in the sphere of the antimonopoly policy, combating unfair competition practices and governmental regulation of natural monopolies.

The FAS of Russia has established ties and participates in the work of the Organization of Economic Cooperation and Development (OECD), Interstate Council for Antimonopoly Policy (ICAP) uniting 10 CIS Countries and Ukraine, United Nations Conference on Trade and Development (UNCTAD), Eurasian Economic Union (EEU), International Competition Network (ICN), BRICS, European Union (basing on the Agreement on partnership and cooperation between Russia and the EU entered into force in 1997), Asia-Pacific Economic Cooperation (APEC), Energy Regulators Regional Association (ERRA).

To enhance international cooperation in the competition field, the FAS of Russia holds annually the event “Russian Competition Week” which in 2015 gathered heads of competition authorities of the countries all across the globe and was attended by Vladimir Putin.

== Prominent cases ==
=== Google ===
On September 14, 2015 the FAS of Russia's Commission arrived to the conclusion on abuse by the Google group of companies of its dominant position on the market of pre-installed application stores, based on investigating the case against Google Inc, Google Ireland Ltd., Google Ltd., following the Russian Internet company Yandex' complaint that Google’s search engine was compulsorily installed as the default on mobile devices and that its icons enjoyed preferential placement on the screen. To restore competition on the market, Google, in accord with the FAS Russia's determination, must adjust its contracts with mobile devices vendors within a month – exclude anticompetitive requirements from the contracts that restrict installing applications and services of other vendors. In 2021, the FAS fined Google once again on the grounds of alleged violations of advertising law.

== See also ==
- Russian competition law
- Federal Trade Commission
