= Dmitry Mironov (politician) =

Russian politician, Yaroslavl Oblast governor

- Дмитрий Миронов
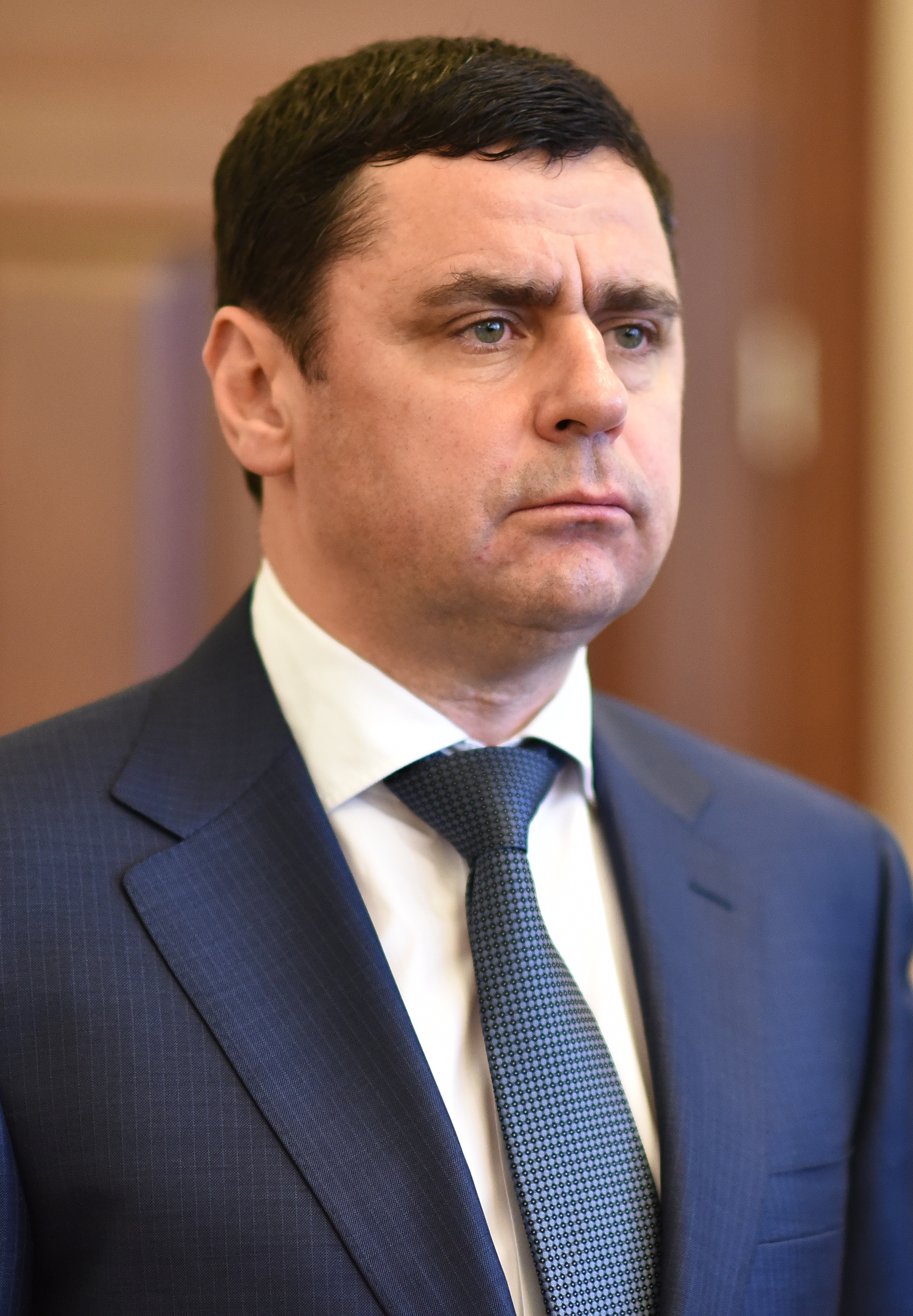
- Mironov in 2016

Aide to the President of Russia
- Incumbent
- Assumed office 12 October 2021
- President: Vladimir Putin

Governor of Yaroslavl Oblast
- In office 10 September 2017 – 12 October 2021; Acting: 28 July 2016 – 10 September 2017
- Preceded by: Sergey Yastrebov
- Succeeded by: Mikhail Yevrayev

Deputy Minister of the Interior of the Russian Federation
- In office 23 December 2015 – 28 July 2016

Personal details
- Born: 13 October 1968 (age 58) Khabarovsk, RSFSR, Soviet Union
- Children: 1
- Education: Moscow Higher Combined Arms Command School

Military service
- Allegiance: Soviet Union; Russia
- Branch/service: KGB; Federal Security Service; Ministry of Internal Affairs
- Years of service: 1990-2016
- Rank: Colonel general

Dmitry Yuryevich Mironov (Russian: Дмитрий Юрьевич Миронов; born 13 October 1968) is a Russian politician, currently serving as an Aide to the President of Russia.

Mironov served as governor of Yaroslavl Oblast between 10 September 2017 and 12 October 2021, and had previously been acting governor of the oblast from 28 July 2016 to 10 September 2017). He has been head of the working group on youth policy of the State Council of the Russian Federation since 2018. He is a former employee of Federal Protective Service and the Ministry of Internal Affairs, and has the rank of a police colonel general.

== Biography ==
Mironov was born into a military family on 13 October 1968 in Khabarovsk.

Mironov graduated from the Moscow Higher Military Command School, having received a diploma and the rank of lieutenant in a festive atmosphere on Moscow's Red Square. Since 1990, he served in the KGB of the USSR, and after its reorganization in 1991, he served in the state security bodies of the Russian Federation. He was awarded the Order "For Merit to the Fatherland" IV degree. In 2010, he was responsible for the safety of Prime Minister Vladimir Putin on his trip from Khabarovsk to Chita.

=== Service in the Ministry of Internal Affairs ===
In 2013, Mironov joined the Ministry of Internal Affairs, where he became an assistant to the Minister of the Interior Vladimir Kolokoltsev. On 18 February 2014, by decree of the President of Russia, he was appointed First Deputy Head of the Main Directorate of Criminal Investigation of the Ministry of Internal Affairs of the Russian Federation, Viktor Golovanov. Mironov was also awarded the title of Major General of the Police. At the same time, many high-ranking policemen were fired or arrested.

On 12 May 2014, Mironov was appointed head of the Main Directorate of Economic Security and Anti-Corruption. Previously, this post was held by Denis Sugrobov. On the same day, Vladimir Putin's head of security, the deputy director of the FSO, Viktor Zolotov, was appointed to the post of first deputy Vladimir Kolokoltsev.

On 1 September 2014, by order of President Vladimir Putin, Mironov was included in the Interdepartmental Working Group on Combating Illegal Financial Transactions, which involved representatives of the Security Council, the General Prosecutor's Office, the Investigative Committee, the FSB, the Ministry of Internal Affairs, the Federal Tax Service, the Federal Customs Service, Rosnarkokontrol, and the Ministry of Finance, Federal Service for Financial Monitoring, Ministry of Economic Development, Central Bank.

=== Deputy Minister of the Interior ===
On 23 December 2015, Mironov was appointed Deputy Minister of Internal Affairs of Russia Vladimir Kolokoltsev. On 16 February 2016, by order of the President, he was appointed Executive Secretary of the Working Group on Monitoring and Analysis of Law Enforcement Practices in the Field of Entrepreneurship. On February 20, 2016, by Presidential Decree he received the next special rank of Lieutenant General of the Police.

=== Head of the Yaroslavl region ===
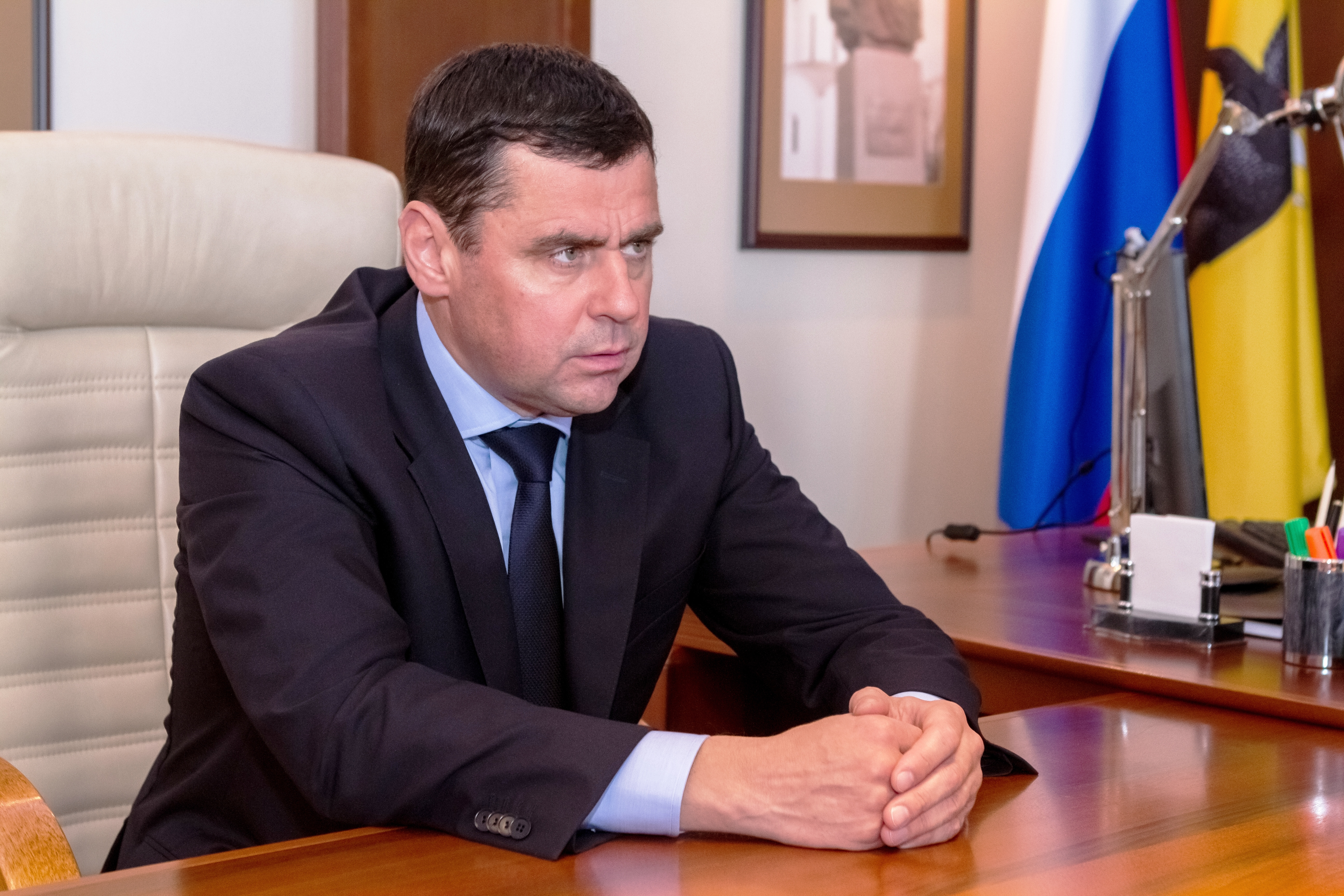
Dmitry Mironov in the office of the governor of the Yaroslavl Oblast.

On 27 July 2016, Dmitry Mironov was summoned to a meeting with Russian President Vladimir Putin, after which he was appointed Acting governor of Yaroslavl Oblast until the September 2017 election. The newspaper Kommersant noted that Mironov, like the new governor of Tula Oblast, Aleksey Dyumin, came from the guard of Vladimir Putin and “was one of the adjutants of the head of state”.

In June 2017, the United Russia party nominated Dmitry Mironov as a candidate for governor of Yaroslavl Oblast. At the regional elections on 10 September 2017, Mironov received 79% of the vote in the 2017 Yaroslavl Oblast gubernatorial election. He took up his five-year term of office on 19 September.

Mironov became head of the working group on youth policy of the State Council of the Russian Federation on 27 December 2018. Mironov resigned as governor on 12 October 2021, and was immediately appointed an Aide to the President of Russia.

=== Aide to the President of Russia ===
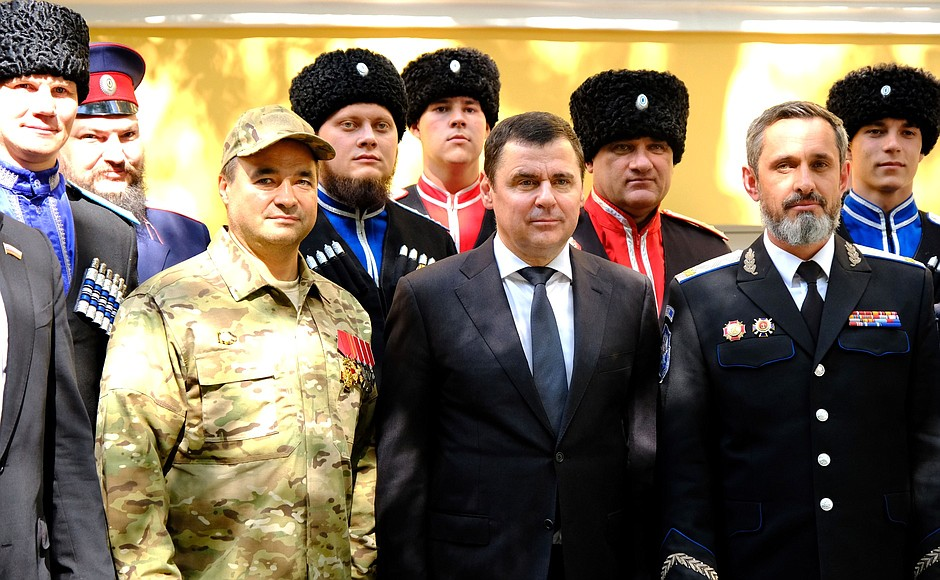
Dmitry Mironov at the Opening of the Central Museum of Russian Cossacks.

Mironov was appointed as an Aide to the President of Russia on 12 October 2021 and reappointed 14 May 2024.

Since 25 October 2021 he has served as Chairman of the Presidential Council for Cossack Affairs. On 2 June 2022 he was appointed Chairman of the Presidential Commission on Civil Service and Management Reserve. He is also Chairman of the Commission on State Awards, Citizenship Commission, and Commission on Personnel Policy in Certain Federal Government Bodies. He sits on the Commission for Preliminary Consideration of Issues of Appointment of Judges and Termination of Their Powers. Since October 2021 he has been a member of the Presidential Council for Combating Corruption.

== Hobbies ==
Mironov is fond of hockey, and participates in matches of the Night Hockey League. He and Vladimir Putin usually play on opposing teams.

Dmitry Mironov is active on social media; accounts are regularly updated. The governor's accounts on Instagram and Vkontakte are the most popular: almost 25 thousand subscribers and 29 thousand subscribers, respectively.

The journalist of Komsomolskaya Pravda, Alexander Gamov, found out that Mironov has good relations with a native of the Yaroslavl region, the world's first female astronaut, State Duma deputy Valentina Tereshkova. In an interview published on 11 November 2016, Gamov notes that the governor (at that time - acting) travelled around Yaroslavl in an unmarked car, and without security.

== Family ==
In 2018, Dmitry Mironov got married, but he did not advertise it anywhere. The press became aware of the marriage from the declaration of income and property of the governor, which is published on the website of the regional government, where a column appeared about the spouse. His wife is Tatyana Lyai, a former model who as of 2024 was receiving a salary from Peton Khimtek, an oil and gas developer for Gazprom. His father is Yuri Alexandrovich Mironov, a graduate of the Military Institute of Physical Culture who has served in the Central Sports Club of the Army(CSKA) since 1972 and has since 2014 served as an advisor. His brother, Evgeny runs a business tied to Gazprom. In early March 2020, Dmitry Mironov told reporters that he recently had a son. His maternal grandfather is Colonel Timofey Karmatsky, a recipient of the Hero of the Soviet Union, Order of Lenin, and Order of the Red Banner.
