= Yaroslavl Oblast Duma =

Regional parliament of Yaroslavl Oblast, Russia

Yaroslavl Oblast Duma Ярославская областная дума
- 7th legislature

Type
- Type: Unicameral

Leadership
- Chairman: Mikhail Borovitsky, United Russia since 16 February 2021

Structure
- Seats: 46
- Political groups: United Russia (38) CPRF (2); New People (2); SR—ZP (1); LDPR (1); RPPSJ (1) Independent (1)

Elections
- Voting system: Mixed
- Last election: 8-10 September 2023
- Next election: 2028

Meeting place
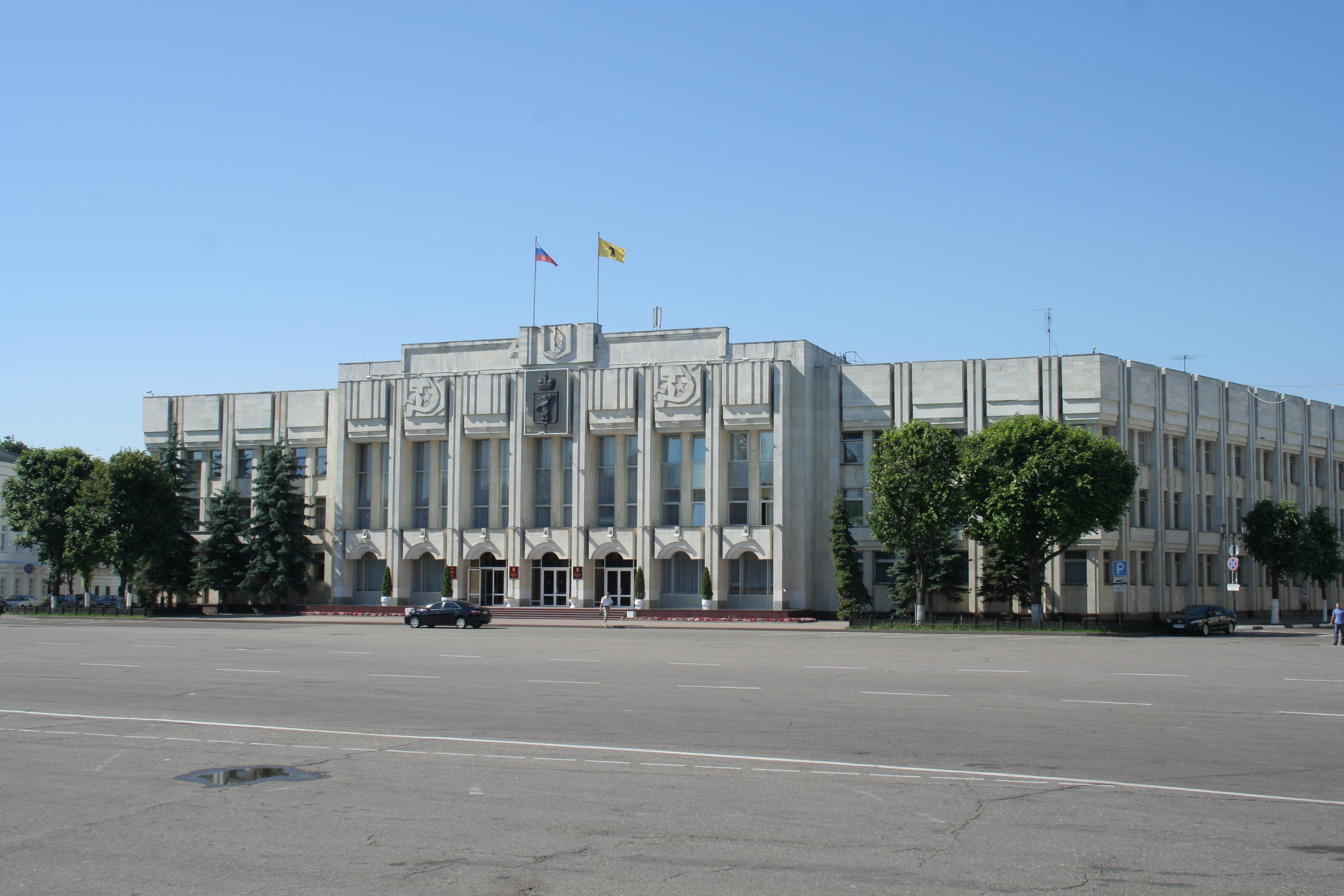

Website
- yarduma.ru

The Yaroslavl Oblast Duma (Russian: Ярославская областная дума, romanized: Yaroslavskaya oblastnaya duma) is the regional parliament of Yaroslavl Oblast, a federal subject of Russia. A total of 46 deputies are elected for five-year terms.

== Elections ==
=== 2018 ===
| Party | % | Seats |
|---|---|---|
| United Russia | 38.43 | 32 |
| Communist Party of the Russian Federation | 24.03 | 11 |
| Liberal Democratic Party of Russia | 12.97 | 3 |
| A Just Russia | 10.26 | 3 |
| Communists of Russia | 6.63 | 1 |
| Registered voters/turnout | 28.51 | |

=== 2023 ===
| Party | % | Seats |
|---|---|---|
| United Russia | 46.60 | 38 |
| Communist Party of the Russian Federation | 11.27 | 2 |
| A Just Russia | 11.19 | 1 |
| Liberal Democratic Party of Russia | 11.14 | 1 |
| New People | 7.39 | 2 |
| RPPSJ | 7.39 | 2 |
| Independent | | 1 |
| Registered voters/turnout | 27.35 | |

== Chairmen ==
The chairman of Yaroslav Oblast Duma is the presiding officer of the duma.

- Valentin Melekhin 1994–1995
- Vladimir Komov 1995–1996
- Sergey Vakhrukov 1996–2000
- Valery Shamin 2000
- Andrey Krutikov 2000–2008
- Victor Rogotsky 2008–present
