= 2014 in Russia =

- Decades: 1990s; 2000s; 2010s; 2020s
- See also: History of Russia; Timeline of Russian history; List of years in Russia

The following lists events that happened in 2014 in Russia.

== Incumbents ==
- President of Russia: Vladimir Putin
- Prime Minister of Russia: Dmitry Medvedev

=== Governors ===
- Amur Oblast: Oleg Kozhemyako (ER)
- Arkhangelsk Oblast: Igor Orlov (ER)
- Astrakhan Oblast: Alexander Zhilkin (ER)
- Belgorod Oblast: Yevgeny Savchenko (ER)
- Bryansk Oblast: Nikolay Denin (until September 9, ER), Alexander Bogomaz (starting September 9, ER)
- Chelyabinsk Oblast: Mikhail Yurevich (until January 15, ER), Boris Dubrovsky (starting January 15, ER)
- Irkutsk Oblast: Sergey Yeroshenko (ER)
- Ivanovo Oblast: Pavel Konkov (ER)
- Kaliningrad Oblast: Nikolay Tsukanov (ER)
- Kaluga Oblast: Anatoly Artamonov (ER)
- Kemerovo Oblast: Aman Tuleyev (ER)
- Kirov Oblast: Nikita Belykh (Independent)
- Kostroma Oblast: Sergey Sitnikov (ER)
- Kurgan Oblast: Oleg Bogomolov (until February 14, ER), Alexei Kokorin (starting February 14, ER)
- Kursk Oblast: Aleksandr Mikhailov (ER)
- Leningrad Oblast: Alexander Drozdenko (ER)
- Lipetsk Oblast: Oleg Korolyov (ER)
- Magadan Oblast: Vladimir Pechnyony (ER)
- Moscow Oblast: Andrey Vorobyov (ER)
- Murmansk Oblast: Marina Kovtun (ER)
- Nizhny Novgorod Oblast: Valery Shantsev (ER)
- Novgorod Oblast: Sergey Mitin (ER)
- Novosibirsk Oblast: Vasily Yurchenko (until March 18, ER), Vladimir Gorodetsky (starting March 18, ER)
- Omsk Oblast: Viktor Nazarov (ER)
- Orenburg Oblast: Yury Berg (ER)
- Oryol Oblast: Alexander Kozlov (until February 26, ER), Vadim Potomsky (starting February 26, CPRF)
- Penza Oblast: Vasily Bochkarev (ER)
- Pskov Oblast: Andrey Turchak (ER)
- Rostov Oblast: Vasily Golubev (ER)
- Ryazan Oblast: Oleg Kovalyov (ER)
- Sakhalin Oblast: Alexander Khoroshavin (ER)
- Samara Oblast: Nikolai Merkushkin (ER)
- Saratov Oblast: Valery Radaev (ER)
- Smolensk Oblast: Alexey Ostrovsky (LDPR)
- Tambov Oblast: Oleg Betin (ER)
- Tomsk Oblast: Sergey Zhvachkin (ER)
- Tula Oblast: Vladimir Gruzdev (ER)
- Tver Oblast: Andrey Shevelyov (ER)
- Tyumen Oblast: Vladimir Yakushev (ER)
- Ulyanovsk Oblast: Sergey Morozov (ER)
- Vladimir Oblast: Svetlana Orlova (ER)
- Volgograd Oblast: Sergey Bozhenov (until April 2, ER), Andrey Bocharov (starting April 2, ER)
- Vologda Oblast: Oleg Kuvshinnikov (ER)
- Voronezh Oblast: Alexey Gordeyev (ER)
- Yaroslavl Oblast: Sergey Yastrebov (ER)
- Jewish Autonomous Oblast: Alexander Vinnikov (ER)

== Events ==
=== January ===
- 9 January – Russian authorities investigate six suspicious deaths and at least one car explosion in southern Russia's Stavropol territory, about 300 miles from Sochi, the site of next month's Winter Olympics.
- 14 January – Russia expels American journalist David Satter from the country in the first such case since 1982.
- 17 January – Vladimir Putin cautions gay people should not "spread gay propaganda" when visiting the host city of Sochi.
- 18 January – Seven suspected militants are killed by Russian security forces in a shootout near Makhachkala in Dagestan.
- 20 January
  - An Islamist group claims responsibility for the bombings and threatens attacks on the 2014 Winter Olympic Games to be held in Sochi.
  - Mike Rogers accuses Edward Snowden of collaborating with Russia.
- 23 January – Supreme Court of Russia releases Platon Lebedev, a business partner of Russian magnate and former head of Yukos Mikhail Khodorkovsky, after he spent more than 10 years in jail.
- 29 January – Largest Russian TV providers disconnected leading independent TV Rain channel. The previous days the channel was criticised by Vladimir Putin's press secretary and Russian parliament members.

=== February ===
- 3 February – Two people are shot and killed and 29 students are taken hostage at a high school in Moscow. The suspected shooter, a 15-year-old student at the school, surrenders to authorities. It is one of the first school shootings to occur in Russia.
- 7 February
  - Russia's Foreign Ministry calls new US sanctions against Iran a "direct violation of the Geneva deal" and "unacceptable".
  - 2014 Winter Olympics:
    - The opening ceremony is held in Sochi.
    - A man attempts to hijack a Pegasus Airlines flight from Kharkiv, Ukraine, and demands to be flown to Sochi; the pilots turned off the inflight monitors and landed in Istanbul, Turkey, where the passenger was arrested.
- 9 February – A gunman kills two people at a Russian Orthodox cathedral in Yuzhno-Sakhalinsk, Sakhalin.
- 12 February
  - Russia says it will veto a U.N. resolution on humanitarian aid access in Syria, claiming that the draft is an effort to prepare for military strikes against President Bashar al-Assad's regime.
  - Russians Tatiana Volosozhar and Maxim Trankov win the gold in pairs figure skating, becoming the first to do on home ice since Maxi Herber and Ernst Baier at the 1936 Winter Olympics.
- 13 February
  - Egypt–Russia relations:
    - During a two-day visit by an Egyptian delegation in Moscow, Russian Foreign Minister Sergey Lavrov said that Moscow and Cairo have agreed to speed up work on drafting agreements on military-technological cooperation. Russian Defense Minister Sergey Shoigu added that this could include joint military exercises and training of Egyptian officers in Russian military academies.
    - Russian President Vladimir Putin says he supports Egyptian Defense Minister Abdel Fattah el-Sisi's bid for the upcoming presidential election in Egypt.
- 17 February – Iran's ambassador to Russia says that Russia could build a second reactor at Iran's Bushehr nuclear power plant in exchange for Iranian oil, under an oil-for-goods deal being negotiated that has alarmed the United States.
- 19 February – Nadezhda Tolokonnikova and Maria Alyokhina, former members of Pussy Riot, are arrested and subsequently released after protesting during the 2014 Winter Olympics in Sochi.
- 20 February
  - Alpine skier Bogdana Matsotska of the Ukraine Olympic team decides to pull out of the Winter Games in Sochi, as widespread anti-government protests back home leave dozens dead and hundreds injured.
  - Adelina Sotnikova wins the gold at the Olympics, giving Russia its first Olympic gold medal in ladies' singles figure skating.
- 23 February
  - Former Ukrainian President Viktor Yanukovych is blocked by Ukraine's customs in Donetsk from taking a plane to Russia.
  - The Winter Olympics in Sochi officially concludes.
- 24 February – Police arrested over 400 people in Manege Square hours after picking up some 200 people outside the court where the Bolotnaya square case defendants were being tried.
- 25 February – Russia's leading opposition activists Boris Nemtsov, Alexei Navalny, Ilya Yashin are jailed for 7–10 days for disobeying a police officer while protesting against the Bolotnaya square case. The previous day, in Moscow police detained over 400 people, including Nadezhda Tolokonnikova and Maria Alyokhina.
- 26 February – The President of Russia, Vladimir Putin, orders snap military exercises near the Ukraine border.
- 27 February
  - 2014 Crimean crisis:
    - The Parliament of Ukraine's Autonomous Republic of Crimea announces a referendum to determine the region's future and ousts the regional government.
    - Ousted President Viktor Yanukovich, whose whereabouts remained unknown before he turned up in Russia, issues a statement saying that he is still the legitimate president and "ready to fight to the end" to fulfill his deal with the opposition.
    - Around 50 armed men bearing Russian national symbols seize the building of the Supreme Council of Crimea following clashes between the ethnic Tatar and Russian protesters. The interim authorities of Ukraine put security forces on alert.
    - The Autonomous Republic of Crimea has announced that it plans to hold a referendum for independence the same day as the elections in Ukraine.
- 28 February
  - 2014 Crimean crisis:
    - Members of the Russian Parliament propose new laws that would make it easier for Russia to incorporate parts of Ukraine.
    - Russia finally confirms that it has moved troops in Ukraine's Crimea region to protect its own interests.
    - Acting General Prosecutor General Oleh Makhnitskyi formally calls on Russia to extradite ousted President Viktor Yanukovych along with 10 other figures; the list includes former Prosecutor General Viktor Pshonka, former Interior Minister Vitaliy Zakharchenko, Yanukovich aide Andriy Klyuyev, and former Justice Minister Olena Lukash.
    - Interim President of Ukraine Oleksandr Turchynov says the Russian military is "directly involved" in the crisis in Crimea, while Interior Minister Arsen Avakov describes the events as "a military invasion and occupation".
    - News agency Interfax-Ukraine reports that armed pro-Russian men have taken over control of two airports, among which Simferopol International Airport, and raised the Russian Navy flag.
  - Russian businessman and oppositionist Gleb Fetisov, a co-chair of the Alliance of Greens and Social Democrats, detained in Moscow.
  - The leader of the People's Alliance opposition party Alexei Navalny placed under house arrest.

=== March ===
- 1 March
  - 2014 Crimean crisis:
    - Russian President Vladimir Putin formally asks the Federation Council of the Russian Parliament for approval to use armed forces in Ukraine. He receives unanimous support. The council also demands for President Putin to recall the Russian Federation ambassador to the United States.
    - US President Barack Obama warns Russia, saying that any violation of Ukraine's sovereignty and territorial integrity would be "deeply destabilizing," and that "the United States will stand with the international community in affirming that there will be costs for any military intervention in Ukraine."
    - De facto Prime Minister of Crimea Sergey Aksyonov claims control of all military, police and other forces in Crimea and asks the President of Russia Vladimir Putin for assistance.
    - Russian Federation ambassador to the United Kingdom is summoned by the British Secretary of State William Hague.
    - The U.N. Security Council is to be summoned for the second time in just two days.
- 2 March
  - 2014 Crimean crisis:
    - Ukraine's Navy commander-in-chief, Denis Berezovsky who was appointed only 1 March, defects to the Russia-backed Crimea government.
    - Ukraine's acting president Oleksandr Turchynov says Ukraine's airspace has been closed to any non-civilian aircraft.
  - In Russia, police detained several hundred anti-war protesters in Moscow.
- 3 March
  - 2014 Crimean crisis:
    - The commander of the Ukrainian frigate Hetman Sahaydachniy reportedly confirms that the ship never defected to Russia as reported in Russian media.
    - Ireland's deputy leader Eamon Gilmore responds by summoning his Russian ambassador for talks.
    - The Lithuanian and Polish presidents call for NATO treaty Article 4 consultations on the basis that Russia is executing military maneuvers in Kaliningrad, close to the borders with Lithuania and Poland.
    - Reuters reports that armed men have seized a ferry checkpoint between Crimea and Russia.
- 4 March
  - 2014 Crimean crisis:
    - Russian President Vladimir Putin holds a press conference, saying that “force isn't needed right now” after deploying roughly 16,000 troops to Crimea.
    - Swedish foreign secretary Carl Bildt compares the ousted Ukraine President Viktor Yanukovych to Norwegian traitor Vidkun Quisling after Yanukovych asked Russia to intervene to restore "law and order" in the country.
    - Russia's UN ambassador says to the UN Security Council that Ukraine's fugitive former President Viktor Yanukovych requested Russian soldiers in the strategic Crimea region "to establish legitimacy, peace, law and order," contradicting the president's own comments last week.
    - Vladimir Putin orders troops near the Ukraine border to return to their bases with Kremlin spokesman Dmitry Peskov calling the military exercises a "success".
- 5 March
  - 2014 Crimean crisis:
    - UN Envoy Robert Serry is ordered to leave Crimea at gunpoint after being threatened by 10–15 armed men.
    - Saying she cannot be part of a network that "whitewashes the actions of Russian President Vladimir Putin", Washington-based anchor Liz Wahl resigns on-air from the Russian government-backed news channel RT.
- 6 March – A special referendum date is moved again. Now it becomes 16 March 2014 instead of the previously announced 30 March. Voters will be asked whether they wish to stay part of Ukraine or join the Russian Federation.
- 7 March
  - 2014 Crimean crisis:
    - Armed men – thought to be Russian – attempt to seize a Ukrainian military base in Sevastopol, withdrawing soon afterwards.
    - Turkey scrambles fighter jets after a Russian surveillance plane flew along its Black Sea coast.
- 10 March – A pro-Russian military force of just about a dozen men take control of the Ukrainian naval base near the town of Bakhchysarai.
- 12 March – Russia says planned U.S. financial aid to Ukraine is illegal.
- 13 March
  - 2014 Crimean crisis:
    - Leaders in the Ukrainian Kherson Oblast threaten to shut off all power and water to Crimea if the referendum goes forward.
    - Russia masses its military near the Ukrainian border again as new military operations are announced.
- 14 March – United States Secretary of State John Kerry and Russian Foreign Affairs Minister Sergey Lavrov meet in London, United Kingdom, to discuss the current Crimean crisis.
- 15 March – The March of Peace took place in Russia a day before the Crimean referendum. 30,000 people participated in anti-war protests in Moscow.
- 16 March – Voters in Crimea vote overwhelmingly to leave Ukraine and rejoin Russia. Ukraine, the European Union, and the United States condemn the referendum, which did not give voters the option of the status quo.
- 17 March
  - President of the United States Barack Obama announces that the United States will sanction Russian officials that contributed to the current Crimean crisis.
  - The Republic of Crimea is declared.
- 18 March
  - A Ukrainian military serviceman is killed in an attack on a base in Crimea's main city, Simferopol.
  - 2014 Crimean crisis:
    - Japan announces it will fall in line with American sanctions against Russia for its role in promoting the secession of Crimea from Ukraine.
    - The parliaments of Russia and Crimea sign an accession treaty.
    - Transnistria formally requests to join the Russian Federation.
- 19 March – Russian forces overrun the Ukrainian Navy headquarters in Sevastopol and another naval base.
- 20 March
  - 2014 Crimean crisis:
    - The Chancellor of Germany, Angela Merkel, announces the possibility of further sanctions from the European Union against Russia for the invasion and annexation of Crimea.
    - The President of the United States, Barack Obama, announces further sanctions against Russia in response to the annexation of Crimea.
- 21 March
  - 2014 Crimean crisis:
    - The Russian Federation Council, the upper house of the Federal Assembly, approves the annexation of Crimea.
    - The President of Russia Vladimir Putin signs the legislation completing the annexation of Crimea.
  - Ukraine signs an association accord with the European Union in defiance of Russia.
- 22 March – Russian troops capture Novofedorivka, an airbase of the Ukrainian Navy in the western region of the Crimean Peninsula.
- 24 March
  - 2014 Crimean crisis:
    - The interim President of Ukraine Olexander Turchynov orders Ukrainian forces to withdraw from Crimea.
    - UK Prime Minister David Cameron says the planned 40th G8 summit scheduled to be held in Sochi will not take place because of Russia's actions in Crimea.
- 27 March – The General Assembly of the United Nations passes a motion condemning the Russian annexation of Crimea.
- 28 March – Russia announces that it will raise the price Ukraine pays for Russian natural gas by 80%.
- 29 March – Sergei Lavrov, the Foreign Minister of Russia, says that Russia has no intention of invading Ukraine.

=== April ===
- 1 April – NATO suspends "all practical civilian and military cooperation" with Russia as a result of the annexation of Crimea, and no sign that Russian troops have withdrawn from the Ukrainian border.
- 4 April – McDonald's suspends work at all restaurant locations in Crimea.
- 6 April
  - Pro-Russian demonstrators seize an administrative headquarters in the eastern Ukrainian city of Donetsk.
  - Communist Party of the Russian Federation candidate Anatoly Lokot was elected mayor of the third-largest city of Novosibirsk, defeating ruling United Russia party candidate.
- 7 April – Pro-Russian activists occupying a government building in the eastern Ukrainian city of Donetsk have proclaimed the creation of a sovereign Donetsk People's Republic independent of the capital Kyiv.
- 8 April
  - Pro-Russian protests in Ukraine:
    - Ukrainian police detain about 70 people in Kharkiv in an "anti-terrorist" operation that clear government buildings seized by pro-Russian protesters in Kharkiv.
    - United States Secretary of State John Kerry accuses Russian agents and special forces on Tuesday of stirring separatist unrest in eastern Ukraine.
    - Russia warns Ukraine that any use of force in eastern Ukraine could lead to a civil war.
- 9 April – Over 50 people leave a Ukrainian security service building in Luhansk that is currently occupied by pro-Russian separatists. Acting Interior Minister of Ukraine Arsen Avakov states that the unrest will be resolved by force or talks in 48 hours.
- 10 April
  - The Parliamentary Assembly of the Council of Europe suspends Russia's right to vote and take part in election observations as a consequence to its annexation of Crimea.
  - Five Russian lawmakers have asked the Prosecutor General of Russia, Yury Chaika, to investigate whether former Soviet leader Mikhail Gorbachev should face charges for his role in the breakup of the Soviet Union.
- 11 April
  - 2014 Crimean crisis:
    - Montenegro, Norway, Iceland and Albania join the list of countries supporting sanctions including asset freezings and travel bans directed at Russian individuals.
    - Secretary General of NATO Anders Fogh Rasmussen visits Bulgaria and meets with President Rosen Plevneliev, during his visit he calls on Russia to withdraw their troops from the Ukrainian border.
- 12 April – Gunmen gain control of a police department in the town of Slaviansk in the eastern Ukraine.
- 13 April – Ukraine launches a "full-scale anti-terrorist operation" against pro-Russian protesters who have captured police and security forces buildings in the town of Slaviansk.
- 14 April – Pro-Russian gunmen storm another police station, in the town of Horlivka, Donetsk Oblast.
- 15 April
  - 2014 pro-Russian unrest in Ukraine:
    - Shots are fired at Kramatorsk air base as Ukrainian Ground Forces are dispatched to take on separatists. Unconfirmed reports state that 4 pro-Russian militants have been killed and 2 people have been injured. Some reports claim up to 10 deaths.
    - Ukraine's acting President Olexander Turchynov has announced the start of an "anti-terrorist operation" against pro-Russian separatists.
- 16 April – Six armored personnel carriers belonging to the Ukrainian military are captured by pro-Russian protesters amid rising tensions between the protestors and the military.
- 17 April
  - 2014 pro-Russian unrest in Ukraine:
    - Russia and Ukraine together with the United States and the European Union sit down for emergency talks in Geneva. All four agree that "illegal military formations in Ukraine" must be dissolved, and that everyone occupying buildings must be disarmed and leave them. There would be an amnesty for all anti-government protesters under the agreement.
    - A skirmish on the Ukrainian military base in Mariupol by pro-Russian militants results in the deaths of 3 of the militants, the wounding of another 13, and the capture of 63 others.
    - The Ukrainian Army unit whose armoured vehicles were seized by pro-Russian forces is disbanded and its members charged with crimes.
    - Russian President Vladimir Putin admits having sent Russian forces to Crimea last month to protect its military equipment there.
- 18 April – Pro-Russian separatists in Donetsk say they will not leave the government buildings, defying the Kyiv authorities and threatening a new international deal on Ukraine.
- 19 April
  - Ukraine suspends operations against pro-Russian militants in the east of the country over Easter.
  - A suspected meteorite explosion has been recorded over Murmansk.
- 20 April – Three people are killed in an attack on check post in Eastern Ukraine manned by pro-Russian supporters.
- 21 April
  - According to pro-Russian militants, the bodies of two pro-Russian militants are pulled from the Seversky Donets River in Sloviansk, Ukraine, with both having multiple stab wounds. The claim could not be independently verified.
  - Vladimir Putin signs a law greatly easing the granting of Russian citizenship to citizens of the countries formerly comprising the Soviet Union.
- 22 April
  - Russian-born American-Israeli journalist Simon Ostrovsky is reportedly abducted in Sloviansk by the militia of the separatist pro-Russian leader Vyacheslav Ponomarev.
  - Russian political activist Alexei Navalny is ordered to pay 300,000 rubles (US$8,400) in a libel suit by a municipal deputy who Navalny called a drug addict.
- 23 April
  - 2014 pro-Russian unrest in Ukraine:
    - Ukrainian security officials discover that the Assumption Monastery Lavra of the Moscow Patriarchate in Sviatohirsk served as a military base for pro-Russian insurgents who have besieged the region.
    - Ukraine's Deputy Prime Minister Vitaly Yarema announces that pro-Russian militants will be targeted in four eastern cities, Kramatorsk, Slaviansk, Donetsk and Luhansk, as they refuse to vacate government buildings they previously seized, defying the international deal made in Geneva.
- 24 April
  - 2014 pro-Russian unrest in Ukraine:
    - The Ukrainian government says it's regained control of the city hall in the eastern port of Mariupol from pro-Russian separatists. Administrative buildings have been taken over in at least a dozen towns in Eastern Ukraine.
    - Washington accuses Moscow of fomenting unrest in the east, with Obama threatening the possibility of applying additional sanctions on Russia.
    - Russian Foreign Minister Sergei Lavrov accuses the United States of being behind the political upheaval in Ukraine, and said Russia would respond if its interests came under attack.
    - A battle between pro-Russian separatists and Ukrainian troops in Sloviansk, Ukraine, leaves 5 pro-Russian militants dead.
- 25 April – A Ukrainian military helicopter is destroyed after being hit by a rocket-propelled grenade at a base near the town of Kramatorsk in Eastern Ukraine.
- 27 April
  - Pro-Russian rebels in Ukraine free a Swedish observer, but not the other seven European monitors they have been holding for three days.
  - Eight people are killed by a fire in a medical facility in Russia's eastern Altai region.
- 28 April
  - 2014 pro-Russian unrest in Ukraine:
    - Pro-Russian gunmen seize the town of Kostyantynivka, the latest in a string of towns in the eastern Ukraine.
    - The United States imposes a third round of sanctions against Russia, reportedly in response to Russia encouraging rebellion in eastern Ukraine.
    - Two thousand people holding a peaceful demonstration in Donetsk for a united Ukraine are attacked with bats and teargas by pro-Russians.
- 29 April – Pro-Russian militants in the eastern Ukrainian city of Luhansk seize the regional administration's headquarters, resulting in a tense standoff with the militants and security personnel.

=== May ===
- 1 May
  - Pro-Russian militants seize the regional prosecutor's office in the eastern Ukrainian city of Donetsk.
  - The People's Republic of China and Russia announce plans to hold joint naval exercises in the East China Sea in late May amid regional tensions about islands and airspace.
- 2 May – The Armed Forces of Ukraine launch a military operation against separatists in the city of Sloviansk with claims of many deaths and two Ukrainian Army helicopters downed. In the port city of Odesa, violent clashes kill at least 42 people, as pro-Ukrainians set the pro-Russian headquarters on fire.
- 4 May – Pro-Russian activists attack the police headquarters in Odesa, forcing the release of several people held over deadly violence two days before.
- 5 May – Russian media reveals that President Vladimir Putin secretly signed a decree (No. 279) honoring more than 300 journalists for their "objective coverage" of Crimea's seizure from Ukraine.
- 6 May
  - Russian foreign minister Sergei Lavrov rules out any fresh talks in Geneva to defuse the crisis unless pro-Russian groups are also involved.
  - Russian President Vladimir Putin signs into law a bill that bans profanity at arts, cultural and entertainment events.
- 7 May
  - 2014 pro-Russian unrest in Ukraine:
    - Pro-Russian militants recapture the city hall of the southern Ukrainian city of Mariupol hours after the Ukrainian government forces took control of the building from the militants.
    - Five pro-Russian militants are killed and fifteen more are captured during clashes with the Ukrainian military in the outskirts of the southern city of Mariupol.
    - Russian President Vladimir Putin says that Ukraine's presidential election on 25 May is a step "in the right direction", calling on pro-Russian protesters to postpone an 11 May federalization referendum. Putin also added qualifying conditions.
- 8 May – Pro-Russian rebels push forward with plans for a referendum on 11 May ignoring Putin's statement to delay the vote.
- 9 May
  - 2014 Crimea crisis:
    - Russian President Vladimir Putin visits Crimea for the first time since the annexation, arriving in Sevastopol for Victory Day celebrations.
    - Russia test fired several nuclear delivery systems on the Victory day celebrations and also sent a naval flotilla led by the Russian aircraft carrier Admiral Kuznetsov through the English Channel.
- 12 May – Pro-Russian insurgents in Donetsk and Luhansk declare the cities independent states whilst on choosing to join Russia after controversial hastily arranged referendums.
- 13 May – Another 13 individuals, including Russian President Vladimir Putin's first deputy chief of staff, Vyacheslav Volodin and the self-declared mayor of Sloviansk, Vyacheslav Ponomaryov, and two legal entities are added to the EU sanctions list for "undermining or threatening" Ukraine's sovereignty.
- 14 May – Talks to end the crisis in Ukraine begin, without representatives of pro-Russian separatist groups.
- 16 May
  - Pro-Russian rebels quickly withdraw from Mariupol as dozens of unarmed pro-Ukraine steelworkers with some employed by System Capital Management joined by the police start to patrol the city.
  - A Russian Proton-M rocket carrying a communications satellite veers off its intended path and burns up in the atmosphere.
- 19 May
  - 2014 pro-Russian unrest in Ukraine:
    - Russia's President Vladimir Putin says he ordered troops in the Rostov, Belgorod and Bryansk regions to withdraw and return to their permanent bases.
    - NATO secretary general, Anders Fogh Rasmussen, says the Western allies had not seen any sign of a withdrawal of Russian forces.
- 20 May – The President of Russia Vladimir Putin arrives in the People's Republic of China for a state visit.
- 21 May
  - Graham Phillips, a British national and reporter for the Russian TV network RT, is detained in Mariupol by the SBU.
  - Xi Jinping and Vladimir Putin sign a massive 30-year natural gas export contract worth $400 billion.
- 22 May
  - 2014 pro-Russian unrest in Ukraine:
    - At least 11 Ukrainian Army soldiers are killed and 30 injured when pro-Russian separatists attack a military checkpoint.
    - Luhansk People's Republic in eastern Ukraine declares martial law and asks Russia to send peacekeeping troops to protect civilians.
    - The unrecognised Federal State of New Russia confederation is declared and agreements were signed between leaders of two self-proclaimed republics.
  - Negotiations between Iran and Russia regarding the building of two additional nuclear reactors at Iran's Bushehr power plant take place.
- 23 May
  - Russian President Vladimir Putin announces that he will respect the outcome of Ukraine's presidential election.
  - Russia and China veto a U.N. Security Council resolution that would have asked the International Criminal Court to investigate war crimes in Syria.
  - Research shows that the Chelyabinsk meteor was the remnants of an asteroid that collided with another asteroid 290 million years before entering the Earth's atmosphere over Russia in February of last year.
- 26 May
  - 2014 pro-Russian unrest in Ukraine:
    - Pro-Russian militants force the closure of Donetsk International Airport a day after preventing any voters in the city of Donetsk from casting a vote in the Ukrainian presidential election.
    - The Ukrainian Air Force conducts airstrikes on Donetsk International Airport while paratroopers drop in to fight pro-Russian separatists.
- 27 May
  - 2014 pro-Russian unrest in Ukraine:
    - At least thirty pro-Russian separatists have died in fighting over control of Donetsk International Airport; the Ukrainian government claims to have total control of the airport following the clashes with the separatists.
    - The newly elected President of Ukraine Petro Poroshenko vows to continue Kyiv's anti-terrorist operation against pro-Russian militants in the east.

=== July ===
- 15 July – Moscow Metro derailment.
- 17 July – Malaysia Airlines Flight 17 (MH17) was shot down by a surface-to-air missile in Eastern Ukraine controlled by pro-Russian separatists.

=== August ===
- 2 August – Russia has said that any further escalation of the Armenian-Azerbaijani clashes is unacceptable.

=== September ===
- 1 September
  - 2014 pro-Russian unrest in Ukraine:
    - Ukrainian forces battle pro-Russian rebels near Luhansk International Airport. The area is encircled by the pro-Russian forces for over 3 weeks.
    - Valeriy Heletey, Ukraine's Defence Minister, accuses Russia of launching a "great war".
- 3 September
  - 2014 pro-Russian unrest in Ukraine:
    - The RIA Novosti news agency reports that Russian photojournalist Andrey Stenin has been found dead in Ukraine. It was discovered that he died 4 weeks ago.
    - Ukraine claims that the President of Ukraine Petro Poroshenko and the President of Russia Vladimir Putin have agreed to a "permanent ceasefire". Russia later denies these claims.
    - France halts delivery of the first of two Mistral-class amphibious assault ships to the Russian Navy due to circumstances in Ukraine.
- 4 September – The two-day NATO summit in Newport, Wales, begins. Leaders agree to apply further sanctions on Russia. NATO sources claim that there are "several thousand" Russian troops inside Ukraine.
- 5 September – The government of Ukraine and pro-Russian rebels agree to a cease-fire, fighting continues after the announcement.
- 6 September – In an official statement, Patriarch Filaret, who heads the Ukrainian Orthodox Church of the Kyivan Patriarchate, says that Russian President Vladimir Putin has fallen under the spell of Satan and faces eternal damnation to hell unless he repents.
- 8 September – Pro-Russian rebels release 1,200 prisoners under ceasefire deal.
- 12 September – The Government of Ukraine and pro-Russian separatists exchange dozens of prisoners agreed to as part of a ceasefire a week ago. Both sides still hold thousands of prisoners.
- 14 September – Heavy fighting resumes between Ukraine forces and rebels near Donetsk International Airport with at least six people dead.
- 15 September – Heavy shelling on the city of Donetsk leaves 6 people dead and 15 wounded.
- 16 September – Russian billionaire Vladimir Yevtushenkov is placed under house arrest for alleged money laundering.
- 17 September – A rocket attack by pro-Russian separatists in eastern Ukraine kills 10 civilians and injures 12 others in the village of Nyzhnya Krynka near Donetsk.
- 21 September
  - More than 26,000 people in Moscow participate in the largest demonstration so far against Russian president Vladimir Putin and the war in Donbas.
  - Rallies in support of Ukraine and against the war in Donbas take place in Boston, New York, Sydney, Dublin, Madrid, London, Paris, Oslo, Tallinn, Limassol, Istanbul, Antalya, Cologne, Milan, Rome, Vienna, Munich, Prague, Berlin, Moscow, Volgograd, Yekaterinburg, Perm, Krasnoyarsk, Novosibirsk, Berlaul and Petropavlovsk-Kamchatsky.
- 23 September – President of Russia Vladimir Putin warns in a letter to his Ukrainian counterpart Petro Poroshenko that Moscow will restrict Ukraine's access to Russian markets if Kyiv implements any part of a trade agreement with the European Union.
- 24 September – A law is signed that limits foreign ownership stakes in any Russian media assets to 20% by early 2017.
  - Japan imposes additional sanctions on Russia due to the Ukraine conflict and a visit by an aide of the President of Russia Vladimir Putin to a contested island off the coast off northern Japan.
- 29 September – Renewed clashes around the Donetsk International Airport between the pro-Russian rebels and Ukrainian government troops kill at least 12 people in the worst flareup of violence since the ceasefire accord earlier in September.
- 30 September – The Ukrainian military say they have repelled a renewed assault by the pro-Russian forces on the Donetsk International Airport. The airport has been under sustained assaults for over 2 weeks despite an official ceasefire.

=== October ===
- 5 October – Four police officers are killed and four others wounded in a suicide bombing in Grozny, the capital of Russia's North Caucasian republic of Chechnya.
- 16 October – Swedish Military caught a Russian signal from Stockholm archipelago going to Kaliningrad. The signal was sent between a transmitter in Kanholmsfjärden and a transmitter in Kaliningrad. Tomas Reis from the Försvarshögskolan in Sweden confirms that it is a Russian Submarine. The Swedish military also caught a distress call coming from the submarine. Swedish military is hunting down the sub.
- 17 October – Vladimir Putin, the President of Russia, and Petro Poroshenko, the President of Ukraine, will meet at the sidelines of the Asia–Europe Meeting in Milan, Italy to discuss the conflict and supplies of natural gas.
- 21 October A so-called Russian Submarine Mothership is closing in on Sweden. The ship named Professor Logachev was seen from Gotland and was headed north. At the same time, another Russian ship, NS Concord was leaving Swedish waters. It supposedly had a "Hangar for small underwater operations".

=== November ===
- 2 November – Voters in break away "people's republics" (Donetsk People's Republic and Lugansk People's Republic respectively) in Donetsk and Luhansk go to the polls for parliamentary and presidential elections. Rebel leaders Alexander Zakharchenko (Donetsk) and Igor Plotnitsky (Luhansk) appear set for victory in early counting in elections which will be recognised in Russia but not elsewhere. International observers noted a very high turnout.
- 12 November – NATO claims that Russian Army troops and military equipment have entered Ukraine.
- 14 November – Russia plans an "alternative Wikipedia".
- 16 November – The Russian Presidential Library announces plans to establish a Russian version of Wikipedia stating that it would provide more "detailed and accurate" information about the country.
- 26 November – At least three people die in a new round of fighting between the Armed Forces of Ukraine and pro-Russian separatists.
- 27 November – The election commission of Moldova bans the new pro-Russian party Homeland from competing in the elections because of financial support from abroad.

=== December ===
- 1 December
  - A search continues for 52 people missing from a South Korean fishing vessel, the Oriong-501, that sank early in the morning in bad weather in the Bering Sea off Chukotka Autonomous Okrug. Eight people have been rescued including one person who subsequently died.
  - Russia abandons its plans for the South Stream pipeline to Bulgaria due to European Union objections instead looking at a pipeline to Turkey.
  - Russia launches a new national defense facility in Moscow meant to monitor threats to national security in peacetime but take control of the country in wartime.
- 4 December – Islamic insurgents kill three state police at a traffic circle before taking an empty school and a "press house" in Grozny. Ten state forces die with 28 injured in gun battles ending with ten insurgents killed.
- 13 December – India and Russia sign deals on infrastructure, nuclear energy, and defence.
- 16 December
  - 2014 Russian financial crisis:
    - The Bank of Russia announces an increase of its key interest rate, the Russian weekly repo rate, from 10.5 to 17 percent as an emergency move to halt the collapse of the ruble's value and, thereby, stabilize the Russian economy.
    - Despite rate hike, the ruble falls to PP 65+ per US dollar and PP 80+ per Euro.
- 18 December – The European Union imposes sanctions on Russian-annexed Crimea by banning investments and tourism in the region and halting oil explorations.
- 19 December – US President Barack Obama imposes additional sanctions on Russian-controlled Crimea by an executive order forbidding exports of US goods and services to the region.

== Deaths ==
=== January ===
- 4 January – Sergey Kozlov, 53, Russian football player and coach.
- 9 January – Yuri Golov
- 15 January – Gennadi Matveyev
- 16 January – Zoya Krasnova
- 23 January – Yuri Izrael
- 24 January – Igor Badamshin
- 31 January – Alexander Ivashkin

=== February ===
- 1 February – Vasily Ivanovich Petrov
- 13 February – Georgy Martyniuk
- 18 February – Margarita Stāraste-Bordevīka
- 19 February – Valeri Kubasov
- 27 February – Chuner Taksami

=== April ===
- 20 April – Benedikt Sarnov, author and critic

=== August ===
- 2 August – Olga Voronets
- 5 August – Dmitri Anosov
- 5 August – Yakov Yakovlevich Etinger
- 5 August – Vladimir Orlov
- 6 August – Andrey Stenin
- 11 August – Nadezhda Andreyeva
- 20 August – Anton Buslov
- 20 August – Boris Dubin

=== September ===
- 13 September – Dmitry Sakunenko
- 14 September – Boris Khimichev
- 15 September – Nicholas Romanov, Prince of Russia
- 18 September – Oleg Ivanovsky
- 21 September – Sergey Klyashtorny
- 21 September – Galina Konovalova
- 22 September – Alexey Chervonenkis
- 23 September – Anatoly Eiramdzhan

== See also ==
- List of Russian films of 2014
- Outline of the Russo-Ukrainian War
