= We Still Say Grace =

2020 American film by Brad Helmink and John Rauschelbach

- Promotional release poster.
- Directed by: Brad Helmink; John Rauschelbach
- Written by: Brad Helmink; John Rauschelbach
- Produced by: Mark Sonoda
- Starring: Bruce Davison; Holly Taylor; Rita Volk; Arianne Zucker; Dallas Hart; Frankie Wolf; Xavier J. Watson
- Cinematography: Douglas Quill
- Edited by: Sydney Marineau; Devon Marineau
- Music by: Mel Elias
- Production companies: Lexicon Entertainment; Dauntless Studios; Room In The Sky Films; Clouds Rest Ventures; Brothers Shamus Pictures
- Distributed by: 101 Films
- Release date: December 11, 2020 (VOD)
- Running time: 94 minutes
- Country: United States
- Language: English

We Still Say Grace is a 2020 American horror-thriller and coming-of-age film written and directed by Brad Helmink and John Rauschelbach. (Note: Helmink and Rauschelbach also directed a minor horror flick, The Lodge (2008), in which a young couple are victimized by a man purporting to be caretaker of the secluded holiday lodge they had rented.) Starring Bruce Davison and Holly Taylor, the film was digitally released on VOD on December 11, 2020.

== Plot ==
Harold is a religious fanatic who gives his family, consisting of his wife Betty and daughters Maggie and Sarah, an unknown liquid to drink. After revealing it to be poison, Maggie is the only one to become frightened with the thought of dying, and Harold later reveals it was merely a test of faith for a future suicide pact.

The following day, Harold's family is visited by three strangers: Fisher, Randy, and Luke who ask for help replacing a flat tire. After Harold invites them in, he tells them that his family lives several miles away from civilization without a phone. Offering to help, Harold allows the group to stay at his house for another day, but also throws away their beer and criticizes them for using foul language.

At dinner, Fisher establishes himself as the most respectful of the group and tells Harold's family that he is moving to California from Chicago. After asking to use the restroom, Randy sneaks into Harold's room to snoop around. Harold becomes suspicious and searches for Randy before calling for his family, where they find Randy suffering a seizure.

Harold tells the group that their best option is to stay at his place while Randy recovers, and Maggie begins to grow feelings for Fisher. Anxious about the stay, Luke wakes up at night and spots Harold taking a bath with Sarah. In the morning, Luke also finds that Harold lied about having a car and the group uses its tires to fix their vehicle. While doing so, Fisher shows Maggie the inside of the car, where the pair take an instant photograph together that Maggie keeps.

After departing, the group suffers another flat tire and returns to the house. After going on a rant and accusing Harold of molesting Sarah, Luke is kicked out. Before he leaves, Sarah hands him a bottle of poisoned lemonade, and he dies after discovering a spike strip that caused both of their car accidents. At home, Maggie notices that Randy has also died.

Maggie finds a note stating that she is from Nebraska. Fisher also finds several photographs of Maggie and Sarah from the past, where the pair are with other people. Together, Maggie and Fisher realize that Harold and Betty kidnapped the girls as their own after killing their parents. Inside, Betty overhears Sarah and Harold talking about their intimate relationship, and Fisher discovers Randy's body. Harold arrives and knocks Fisher out with chloroform.

At home, Betty commits suicide. Tied up in a basement, Fisher is rescued by Maggie and the pair share a kiss and try to escape, finding a crucified Randy and Luke, before Fisher is shot and killed by Sarah and also crucified. Burning the bodies, Harold says the group served as a sacrifice for god. Discovering Maggie, Harold decides it is time for his family to complete their suicide pact. After handing his daughters a glass of poisoned wine, Sarah willingly drinks it and dies. Maggie, on the other hand, refuses and sees Harold drink from an unpoisoned glass, before hitting him with the wine bottle. Armed with a handgun, Harold searches for Maggie, who cuts his ankles and slashes his neck. The following morning, Maggie looks across the horizon.

== Cast ==
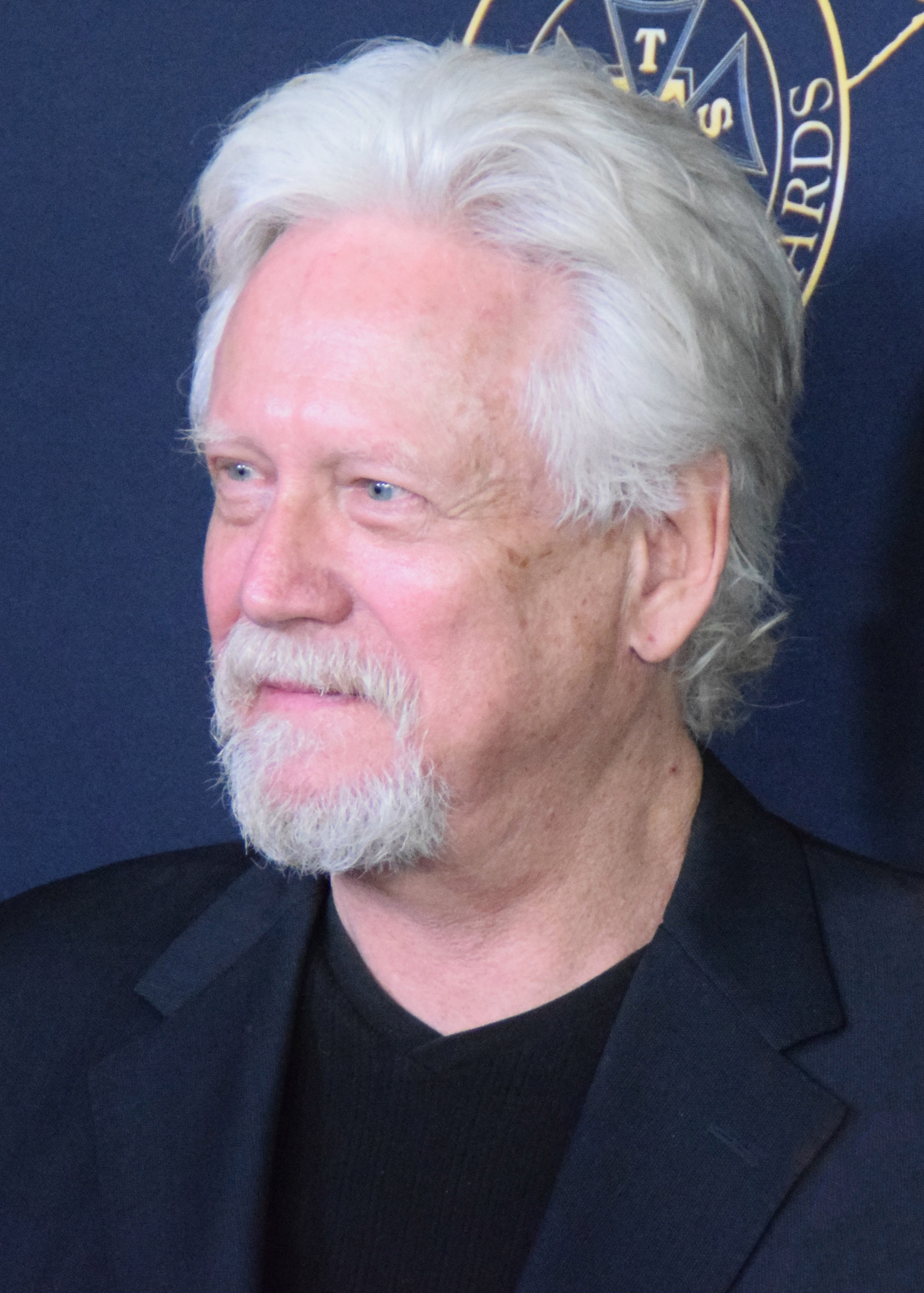
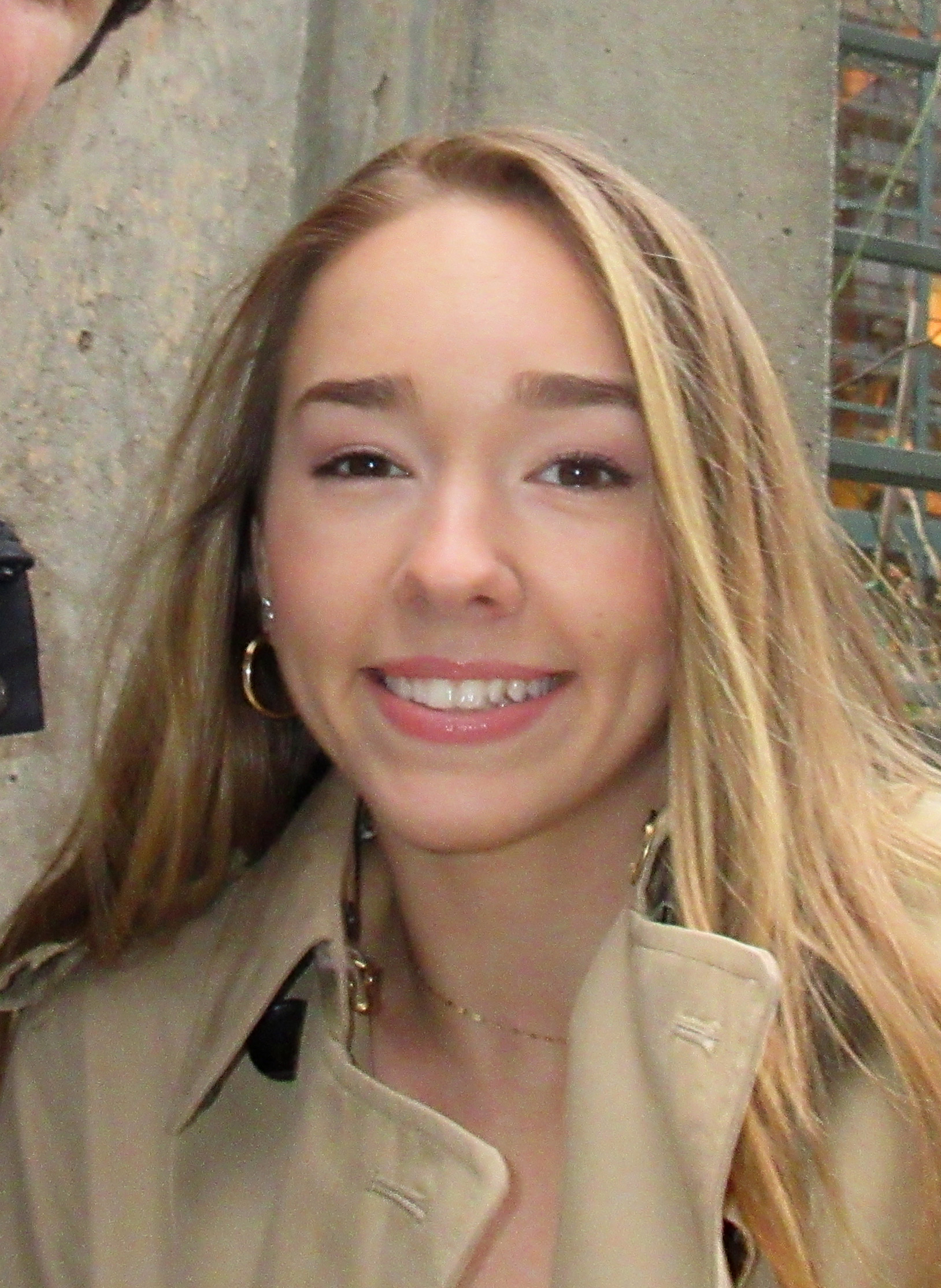
Bruce Davison and Holly Taylor portray Harold and Maggie, respectively.
- Bruce Davison as Harold
- Holly Taylor as Maggie
- Rita Volk as Sarah
- Arianne Zucker as Betty
- Dallas Hart as Fisher
- Frankie Wolf as Randy
- Xavier J. Watson as Luke

== Production ==
Location scouting for We Still Say Grace began in 2017. Filming commenced in November 2018, and concluded the following year in March. According to executive producer Mark Mathias Sayre, most of the film was shot in Agua Dulce, California.

== Reception ==
From The Guardian, Cath Clarke gave the film two stars out of five. While giving positive remarks to the opening scene, Clarke found the acting and story to be unconvincing and "not remotely scary", comparing Bruce Davison's performance to the "likable Jeff Bridges" and suggesting that it should have been written as a black comedy. Writing for HeyUGuys, Sam Inglis gave a more positive review with three stars, and gave praise to the directing, shot framing, and Holly Taylor's performance. However, he also wrote that "what it lacks is ultimately that one thing to make it truly stand out, to push it over the edge from something you'll likely watch and enjoy to something that will linger long in your mind."
