= Swedish submarine incidents =

Incidents involving foreign submarines near Sweden

The submarine hunts or submarine incidents were a series of several incidents involving foreign submarines that occurred in Swedish territorial waters during the Cold War, attributed in Swedish media to the Soviet Union.

On October 27, 1981, the Soviet submarine U 137 became stranded deep inside Swedish waters. The Swedish Navy responded aggressively to these perceived threats, increasing patrols in Swedish waters, mining and electronically monitoring passages, and repeatedly chasing and attacking suspected submarines with depth charge bombs, but no hits or casualties were ever recorded. This incident encouraged development of incident weapons to increase security of future submarine incidents.

Reports of new submarine sightings and television imagery of Swedish Navy helicopters firing depth charges into coastal waters against suspected intruders became commonplace in the mid- to late 1980s. They remain, for many Swedes, one of the iconic images of the Cold War and of the Swedish relation to the Soviet Union—for some underlining what was considered a major threat to Swedish sovereignty, while for others illustrating the tense atmosphere of the time. However, reports of these incidents are contested, and an intensive debate emerged early on. This debate unfolded somewhat, but far from exclusively, along leftwing/rightwing lines, and became tied up with the larger issues of relations to Moscow and Swedish armed neutrality. The Soviet Union consistently denied that it was responsible for violating Swedish waters, and claimed that the U 137 had only crossed the border because of navigational faults. Russia today maintains this stance. While the submarine sightings subsided with the fall of the Soviet Union, the debate about these events has reemerged sporadically. They have been the subject of a number of government investigations in Sweden, and continue to attract media attention.

== List of major reported incidents ==
=== During the cold war ===
1962
During a military exercise, a submarine is discovered by radar and hydrophone, north of Fårö, Gotland. It retreated only after repeated depth charge strikes.
October 1–24, 1966
At 0500 a submarine was reported being sighted in Gullmarsfjorden and warning shots were fired by nearby forces. Other sightings followed by warning shots were repeated during the following days.
On October 24 at mid day a submarine turret conning tower was spotted outside the naval depot ÖGull, deep inside Gullmarsfjorden. Two fishing-type minesweepers from the minesweeping division at Lysekil immediately went out and managed to establish sonar contact with an object standing still at 10 meters below surface. After having established the exact position of the underwater object, the minesweeper Hasslö was called in to fire warning shots at the location, while the other minesweepers kept contact with their sonar. Contact was lost briefly due to stirred up water and the sweeper's propeller wake.
After two hours since the first sighting one of the minesweepers managed to position itself on top of the located object. It then lowered a cable with a 100kg weight attached to confirm the existence of a solid underwater object. The wire slacked at a depth of 10m. As the sweeper moved forwards the weight was dragged on top of the object for a while and then fell down, stretching the wire as it did so.
Immediately after this, the other sweepers both noticed water turbulence, a possible sign of submarine propellers in motion. The sweeper Hasslö then dropped a depth charge 300m away from the echo location and soon after got a radar contact from an object having breached the surface and went down again. Another depth charge was dropped, this time on the exact target location. The echo now disappeared and was not found again despite the search going on through the night followed by helicopters joining in the morning. At dawn (now the 25th) Hasslö moved southwards and after a while its crew spotted a submarine periscope above the surface. The helicopter group was scrambled to the location, managed to establish contact with the submarine and attacked with depth charges. After that the contact with the submarine was lost.
Autumn 1969
During a naval drill on the coast of Norrland, the Swedish submarine Springaren comes into contact with a foreign submarine in Swedish waters; it leaves the scene.
1974
A submarine periscope is spotted by the Swedish Coast Guard near Kappelhamnsviken on Gotland. A destroyer is sent to the scene and establishes contact, at which point the foreign submarine leaves Swedish waters.
Autumn 1976
During a naval drill in the Stockholm Archipelago, a Soviet Type W submarine exposes itself by using radar, outside Swedish territorial waters. A Swedish submarine monitors the Soviet vessel entering Swedish waters, and records sounds from it. When Swedish submarine-hunting helicopters and destroyers arrive, it speeds out towards international waters and disappears.
September 18 – October 6, 1980
The Swedish Marine tugboat Ajax discovers the conning tower of a submarine outside Utö in the Stockholm Archipelago. Submarine hunting helicopters are dispatched to the scene, establish contact, and fire warning shots. The submarine does not leave the area, but attempts to avoid capture, and a prolonged submarine hunt began. This lasted for several weeks, during which time the submarine is repeatedly sighted.
October 27, 1981 (confirmed Soviet violation)
The U 137 incident. On the evening of October 28, 1981, a fisherman residing in the eastern part of the Karlskrona archipelago phoned in to the Swedish Coast Guard and reported that a submarine had run aground in Gåsefjärden, 30 km from the town centre of Karlskrona. Originally, it was not taken seriously because of its location, as Gåsefjärden is a very difficult terrain to navigate in, as well as being a "dead end". Nevertheless, the fisherman was right, and the vessel was found to be of Soviet origin. The grounded submarine generated intense media interest, and Swedish military forces were put on high alert following suspicions that the Soviet Union would try to recapture the vessel. After several rounds of interrogation, the conservative/Liberal government led by Thorbjörn Fälldin decided to release both the vessel and its crew. This marked the beginning of the "submarine hunts" (ubåtsjakter), as nicknamed by Swedish media.
October 1–13, 1982 (established violation, later questioned)

After a long period of submarine incidents, the Swedish Navy set a trap by sealing off an area with mines and sensors. A foreign submarine was then recognized to have entered the trap, and the navy responded in force with major forces stationed nearby. A reported 44 depth charges and 4 naval mines were detonated, trying to sink the submarine, but it was later determined that it avoided the trap or fled at an early stage. This incident triggered the appointment of a parliamentary committee under the leadership of Sven Andersson, which—partly due to the efforts of Carl Bildt—blamed the Soviet Union, thereby escalating tension with Moscow. Later research has cast doubt on many of the conclusions of the committee, with some of the sound recordings from the purported submarine now believed to have come from a civilian ship. The entire incident is now hotly disputed, with some arguing the submarine may have been of NATO origin.
May 4, 1983 (unlikely violation)
A suspected submarine is reported in Törefjärden, North of Luleå, and mines are detonated.
May 1983
Submarine hunt outside Sundsvall. Helicopters establish contact with a foreign submarine, but are unable to fire, reportedly because civilian journalists have entered the safety area.
Summer 1983 (unlikely violation)
Submarine hunt in Töreviken.
August 1983 (unlikely violation)
Submarine hunt in the harbor area of Karlskrona and in the adjoining archipelago. Depth charges are fired inside Karlskrona harbor.
February 9–29, 1984 (unlikely violation)
Another submarine hunt in Karlskrona. 22 depth charges are fired against a suspected submarine.
Early summer 1986 (established violation according to the submarine Commission but not the Swedish Defense Forces in 2001)
A "mysterious object" is reported "diving into the water" in Klintehamnsviken on Gotland. The sea floor is examined, and double-track trace is discovered, allegedly from a submarine vehicle, extending 1100 meters.
1 July 1987 (unlikely violation)
Another submarine hunt in Törefjärden.
Summer 1987 (established violation)
While examining the magnetic sensors of a minefield in Kappelshamnsviken on Gotland, the military discovers "clear traces on the bottom from a tracked submarine vehicle".
Early summer 1988 (established violation)
A suspected foreign submarine is noticed in Hävringebukten outside Oxelösund. Submarine sounds and air venting is said to have been recorded.
February 1, 1990 (confirmed West German submarine)
A West German submarine which, after finding that it had entered the Swedish territory at Simrishamn, reported the mistake in navigation. West Germany has diplomatically deplored the violation.

=== After the cold war ===
Autumn 1992 (established submarine)
In the Hävring bay outside Oxelösund, sonar observation leads to torpedo efforts by Sweden's new submarine force, which, however, risked sinking its own corvette.
April 13, 2011 (incorrect observation)
A possible foreign submarine is noticed in Baggensfjärden in Nacka. The Swedish Armed Forces' Naval Tactical intelligence service, MTS-M2 investigated the incident. Later it was confirmed that the object was really a raft frozen in moving ice.
September 11, 2011
An eyewitness contacts the Swedish armed forces after seeing something outside the harbor of Gothenburg that possibly could have been a foreign submarine. The Swedish Navy deployed several surface warships in an attempt to locate the unknown object.
October 17–24, 2014 (established but later questioned observation)
A large military operation is launched to search for an allegedly damaged submarine in Kanholmsfjärden in the Stockholm archipelago. Encrypted transmissions sent on an emergency radio frequency used by Russian units were recorded. The sources of the transmissions were identified as a submarine and a military site in the Kaliningrad region. On October 19 the military said there had been three separate sightings and released a picture of the unidentified submarine to the public. There were also suggestions that the Russian oil tanker NS Concord was involved as a mother-ship for smaller underwater vehicles as it maintained a pattern of criss-crossing outside Stockholm during the investigation. A Russian research ship equipped with a submarine holding bay, R/V Professor Logachev, was also in the area and turned off its location transponder. Several days later, the hunt was still on as officials were certain that foreign underwater operations were still ongoing. More than 100 sightings were now reported, said Supreme Commander Göransson. Paul Schwartz at Center for Strategic and International Studies, CSIS, said the photograph could be a Russian Lada-class submarine. Sources later said it was certainly at least one mini-submarine and that advanced image analysis "reveales part of a submarine superstructure with two masts behind it". In April 2015, Rear Admiral Anders Grenstad has told Swedish newspapers that the Armed Forces reported to the Swedish government that at least one of the reports of a suspected underwater vessel was in fact only a civilian "working boat," but that the initial suspected vessel is still believed to be foreign.

== Alternative theory ==
Swedish researcher Ola Tunander attributes the majority of these incursions to be of NATO origin:

Following the stranding of a Soviet Whiskey-class submarine in 1981 on the Swedish archipelago, a series of massive submarine intrusions took place within Swedish waters. However, the evidence for these appears to have been manipulated or simply invented. Classified documents and interviews point to covert Western, rather than Soviet activity. This is backed up by former US Secretary of Defense Caspar Weinberger, who stated that Western "testing" operations were carried out regularly in Swedish waters with Swedish cooperation. Royal Navy submarine captains have also admitted to top-secret operations.

Mattias Göransson, the author of the book “The Bear Comes”, which details previously suspected submarine violations that in hindsight proved to be something else, such as minks or shoals of fish, described the 2014 submarine chase as a “political meltdown”.

He said the Swedish media had “about ten thousand chances” to learn to be more critical of claims of foreign powers’ submarines in Swedish waters. He said: “Over the past 40 years, about the same number of underwater intrusions were reported by the population. Despite this, the Navy has failed to present a single bit of sustainable proof of a single conscious Russian submarine infringement.”

== Cultural influence ==
The incursions during 1982 and 1983 form a basis for the plot of The Troubled Man (Den orolige mannen), the final Kurt Wallander novel written by Swedish author Henning Mankell and published in 2009. Mankell considered the incursions to be one of the worst scandals in Swedish political history. Mankell's play Politik debuted in autumn 2010 and dealt with the submarine incidents.

In 1984 a Finn living in Sweden published the satirical Finnish novel Probable Submarine (Todennäköinen sukellusvene) under the pen-name Klaus Viking. The work was later translated to Swedish as Sannolik u-båt by Paul Jansson. The novel is an examination of Swedish culture and politics as seen through the eyes of a Finnish immigrant who takes it upon himself to create some excitement by constructing a sham submarine and towing it through a restricted military area of the archipelago. It reflects a certain degree of amusement with which some segments of Sweden's neighbor populations regarded the country's recurrent searches for submarine violations of its territorial integrity.

The Swedish roleplaying game Expert Partisan, published in 2024, lets the U-137 incident trigger a full-scale Warsaw Pact invasion of Sweden. The game focuses on the civilian resistance in a rural southern province occupied by the East German army. Six months have passed and the war is still going on elsewhere in Sweden.

== See also ==
- 2024 Baltic Sea submarine cable disruptions
- Øresund drone incident

== Bibliography ==
- Leitenberg, Milton (1987). Soviet Submarine Operations in Swedish Waters: 1980-1986. Praeger. ISBN 0275928411.
- Tunander, Ola (2004). The Secret War Against Sweden – US and British Submarine Deception in the 1980s. Routledge. ISBN 978-0-7146-5322-8.
