= A200 LCAW torpedo =

A200 LCAW
- Type: Miniature torpedo
- Place of origin: Italy

Service history
- Used by: Italy, Germany, Norway

Production history
- Manufacturer: Leonardo
- Produced: 1992-present
- Variants: A200, A200/A, A200/N, A202

Specifications
- Mass: 11.3 to 16 kg or greater
- Length: 883 mm to >2 m
- Diameter: 123.8 mm
- Warhead: PBX shaped charge
- Warhead weight: 2.5 kg
- Detonation mechanism: Impact or proximity
- Engine: Contra-rotating direct-drive brushless electric motor
- Propellant: Silver-zinc battery
- Operational range: A200: 700 m (2,300 ft); A200/A: 2 km (1.1 nmi); A200/N: 8 km (4.3 nmi)
- Maximum depth: ≥300 m (980 ft)
- Maximum speed: 18 kn (33 km/h)
- Guidance system: Acoustic homing
- Launch platform: Aerial, surface, submarine

A200 LCAW (Low Cost Antisubmarine Weapon) is a miniature torpedo developed by Whitehead Alenia Sistemi Subacquei S.p.A. (WASS).

== Description ==
The LCAW is a miniature active-sonar homing torpedo originally developed to assist in the classification of targets. In order to deal with a potentially hostile submarine target, either a depth charge or a torpedo would be launched at it, either to kill it or cause it to flee, thus confirming it as a hostile submarine. With the obsolescence of conventional depth charges and the high cost of homing torpedoes, an intermediate solution was developed. The LCAW is intended to fill the gap between conventional depth charge and torpedoes, in the area where depth charges lack propulsion and guidance, while the cost of conventional torpedoes is increasingly becoming prohibitive. The program initially began in 1987, and was completed in 1992. In 1993, the weapon was adopted by Germany and Norway for their low cost antisubmarine weaponry program when the LCAW proved to meet the German and Norwegian requirement of a maximal underwater attack range of 500 m from the point of entry into the water. Norway subsequently developed its own upgraded variant.

In addition to regular deployment, LCAW is also used by Italian naval special forces. The air-dropped version is deployed from NATO standard size A aerial sonobuoy dispensers; moving aircraft can deploy it from an altitude between 45–600 m (148–1,969 ft) and at aircraft speeds of 50–200 kn (93–370 km/h), and helicopters can additionally deploy it while hovering at altitudes of as little as 15 m (49 ft). This allows a single ASW aircraft to carry a considerable number of units. The weapon is primarily designed to engage targets in shallow water, especially midget submarines, diver propulsion vehicles, human torpedoes, sabotage or espionage-related equipment hauled by frogmen, and other hostile entities engaged in underwater special operations.

In 2014, an improved version of the LCAW was presented at the Euronaval 2014 trade show, titled "Black Scorpion". The Black Scorpion became available in 2021.

== Variant ==
All of LCAW variants share the same operating depth, from 15 to 300 meters, and the same diameter, 123.8 mm. The same 2.5 kg PBX shaped charge warhead is adopted by air-launched variants while a tandem charge is shared by surface-launched variants. At least five variants have been developed, including:

- A200: The basic version, 883.4 mm long, weighing 12 kg, with a range of 700 to 1000 meters at 17 kt. Endurance is limited to 2 minutes. An improved version increased speed to 18 kt.
- A200/P: A practice variant of the A200, which incorporates an acoustic pinger and inflatable bag system for recovery, an onboard non-volatile data acquisition system, and a synchronized acoustic transmitter which allows the torpedo to be tracked on a 3D tracking range during exercises.
- A200/A: An air-launched variant, 914.4 mm long, weighing 12.5 kg. Has a rotary air stabilizer. Maximum range of 2 km at 18 kt.
- A200/N: A heavy version for launch by surface ships, 2036 mm long, weighing 32.7 kg, with a range of 8 km at 18 kt, with a stated 70% to 85% probability of hitting a hostile submarine traveling at 8 knots. The ship-launched configuration can also be equipped with a low-cost rocket booster.
- A202: A 16 kg variant for use by frogmen, launched from a man-portable launcher called Medusa, first adopted by the Italian naval special forces.

== Operators ==
Italy
Germany
Norway

== See also ==
- Black Scorpion - Italian torpedo, successor to the A200 LCAW
- Incident weapon - class of weapons designed to interdict potentially hostile vehicles with less-lethal force
