= Spike strip =

Device used to stop wheeled vehicles

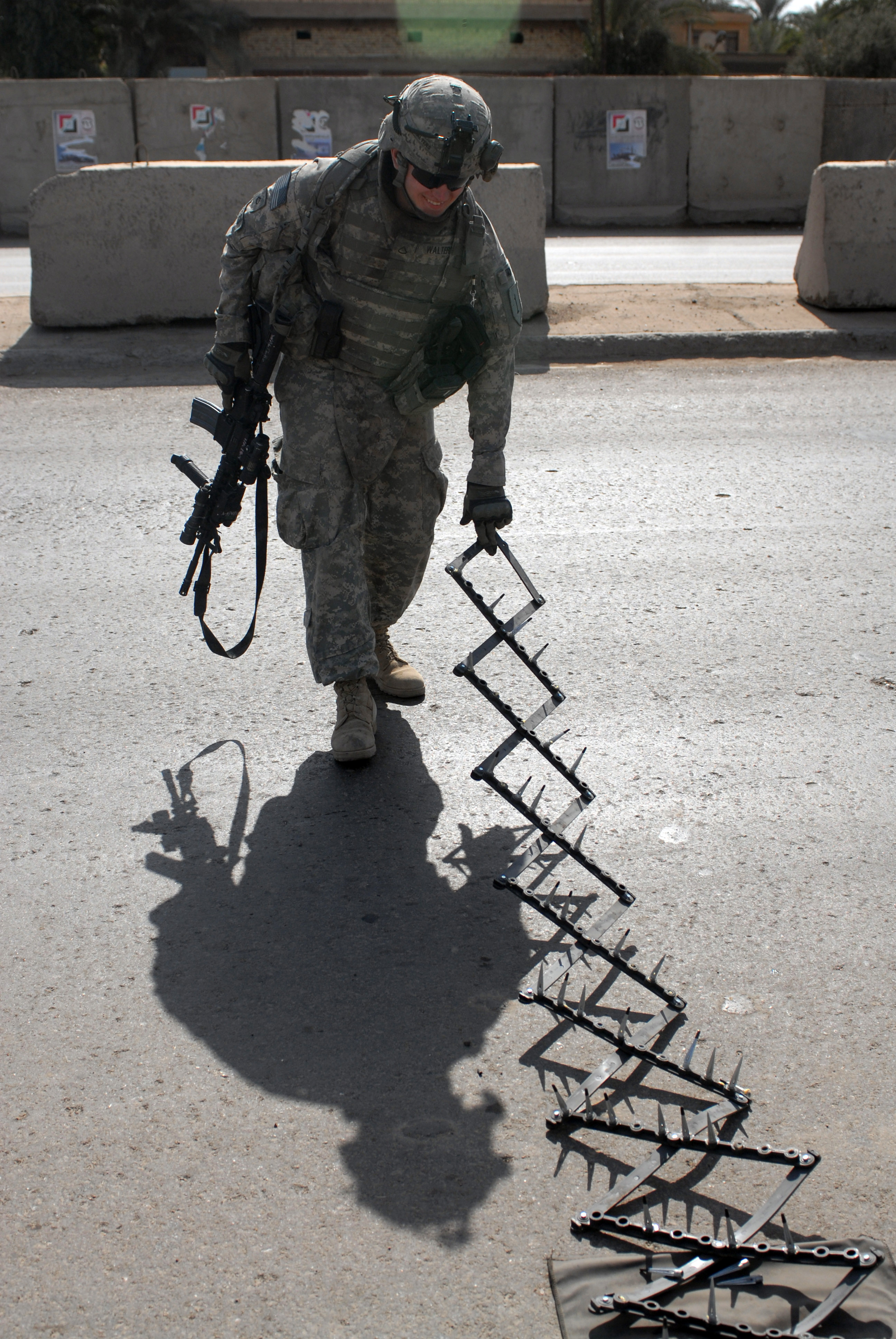
A U.S. Army soldier deploying a stinger at a vehicle checkpoint in Iraq

A spike strip (also referred to as a spike belt, road spikes, traffic spikes, tire shredders, stingers, stop sticks, by the trademark Stinger or formally known as a Tire Deflation Device or TDD) is a device or incident weapon used to impede or stop the movement of wheeled vehicles by puncturing their tires.

Generally, the strip is composed of a collection of 35-to-75-millimetre-long (1 1/2 to 3 in) metal barbs, teeth or spikes pointing upward. The spikes are designed to puncture and flatten tires when a vehicle is driven over them; they may be portable, as a police weapon, or strongly secured to the ground, as those found at security checkpoint entrances in certain facilities. Permanently-secured models usually have retractable spikes and do not cause damage when a vehicle drives over them from the proper direction. They also may be detachable, with new spikes fitted to the strip after use. The spikes may be hollow or solid; hollow ones are designed to detach and become embedded in the tires, allowing air to escape at a steady rate to reduce the risk of the driver losing control and crashing. They are historically a development of the caltrop, with anti-cavalry and anti-personnel versions being used as early as 331 BC by Darius III against Alexander the Great at the Battle of Gaugamela in Persia.

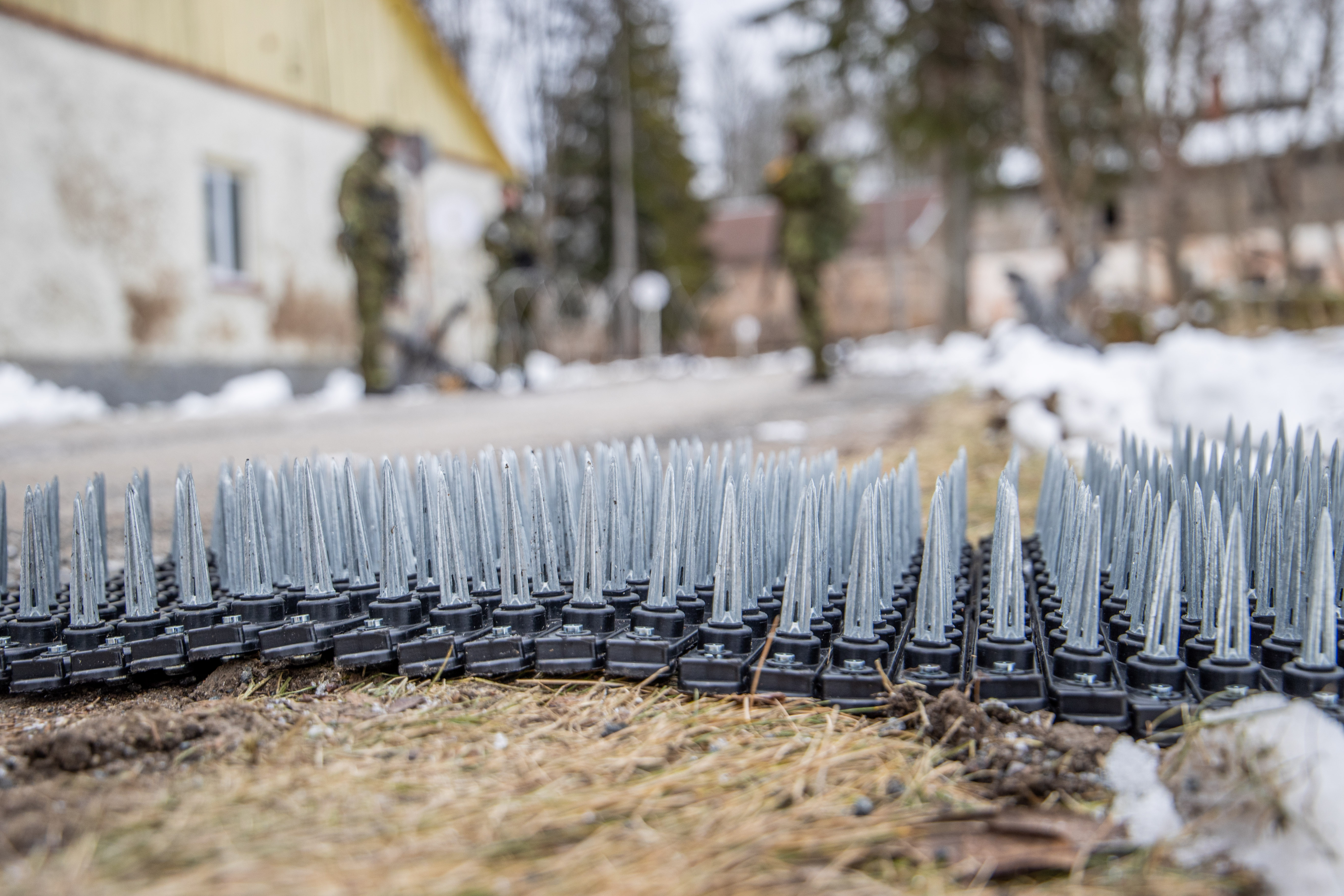
A spike strip used by the Estonian Defence Forces

In the United States, five officers were killed deploying spike strips in 2011, having been struck by fleeing vehicles. Dallas, Texas police are among those banned from using them, in response to the hazards.

Remotely deployable spike strips have been invented to reduce the danger to police officers deploying them.

Private possession of spike strips was banned in New South Wales, Australia in 2003 after a strip cheaply constructed from a steel pipe studded with nails was used against a police vehicle. John Watkins, a member of New South Wales Legislative Assembly, stated they would be added to the New South Wales prohibited weapons list.

Following the rise in terrorist vehicle attacks whereby a vehicle is driven at speed into pedestrians, a net with steel spikes that can be deployed by two people in less than a minute, reported able to stop a vehicle of up to 17 tonnes, was developed for preventive use at public events in the UK, with the name "Talon". It has steel spikes to puncture tires, and becomes entangled around the front wheels, halting the vehicle. It is designed to reduce risk to crowds by making the vehicle skid in a straight line without veering unpredictably. It was first deployed to protect a parade on 11 September 2017.

== See also ==
- Car chase
