= Black Scorpion torpedo =

Black Scorpion
- Type: Miniature torpedo
- Place of origin: Italy

Service history
- Used by: Italy, Cyprus, United Kingdom, UAE

Production history
- Manufacturer: Leonardo
- Produced: 2014-present

Specifications
- Mass: <20 kg
- Length: 1.1 m
- Diameter: 127 mm
- Warhead: PBX shaped charge
- Warhead weight: 2.8 kg
- Detonation mechanism: Impact or proximity
- Engine: Contra-rotating direct-drive brushless electric motor
- Propellant: Thermal battery
- Operational range: Unknown
- Maximum depth: ≤200 m (660 ft)
- Maximum speed: >15 kn (28 km/h)
- Guidance system: Acoustic homing
- Launch platform: Aerial, surface, submarine

Black Scorpion is a miniature torpedo developed by Leonardo S.p.A.

== Description ==
The Black Scorpion is a miniature active-sonar homing torpedo developed from the A200 LCAW, which in turn was originally developed to assist in the classification of targets. In order to deal with a potentially hostile submarine target, either a depth charge or a torpedo would be launched at it, either to kill it or cause it to flee, thus confirming it as a hostile submarine. With the obsolescence of conventional depth charges and the high cost of homing torpedoes, an intermediate solution was developed. The Black Scorpion is a full-featured acoustic homing torpedo with greater speed and endurance than its predecessor. Shallow-water performance has been enhanced, with normal operational depth stated as ranging from 30 to 200 meters when deployed from an aircraft, and a speed of at least 15 knots.

The weapon is capable of launch from surface, underwater, and aerial launch tubes. The air-dropped version is deployed from NATO standard size A aerial sonar buoy dispensers, allowing a single helicopter to carry a considerable number of units and deploy them in rapid succession. Aside from target classification as described above, the weapon is also effective at engaging small underwater targets, such as midget submarines, diver propulsion vehicles, human torpedoes, sabotage or espionage-related equipment hauled by frogmen, and other hostile entities engaged in underwater special operations.

The Black Scorpion was initially presented at the Euronaval 2014 trade show. Following a period of development and testing, the Black Scorpion became available in 2021. The weapon was showcased at the NAVDEX 2023 trade show in Abu Dhabi in 2023. Leonardo S.p.A. is developing a military UUV capable of carrying two Black Scorpion torpedoes.

== Variant ==
Information about specific variants of the Black Scorpion is not yet available. The basic version presented at trade shows has a body diameter of 127 mm, is 1.1 m long, and carries a 2.8 kg shaped charge warhead composed of PBX. The weapon shares many design similarities with the Leonardo MJTE (Mobile Jammer Target Emulator) self-propelled acoustic decoy. Aside from the size A sonobuoy dispenser, the weapon is designed to be compatible with the B534 submarine launch tube, and the B537 canister when used with the B538 launch tube - which can be clustered, similar to smoke and flare launch tubes. Midget submarines can carry the Black Scorpion externally mounted in drop collars. Unlike its predecessor, the weapon uses a thermal battery, which suggests much greater propulsive endurance. The weapon's seeker head features many elements of signal processing and acoustic signal handling developed for the heavyweight Black Shark.

== Operators ==
- Italy - original developer
- Cyprus - obtained by Swarmly Ltd.
- United Kingdom - obtained by Kraken Technology Group
- United Arab Emirates - obtained by Highland Systems

== See also ==
- A200 LCAW - Italian torpedo, predecessor to the Black Scorpion
- Northrop Grumman VLWT (Very Lightweight Torpedo) program
- USN CRAW (Compact Rapid Attack Weapon) program
- Incident weapon - class of weapons designed to interdict potentially hostile vehicles with less-lethal force
