= Incident weapon =

Submarine-disabling or tracking device

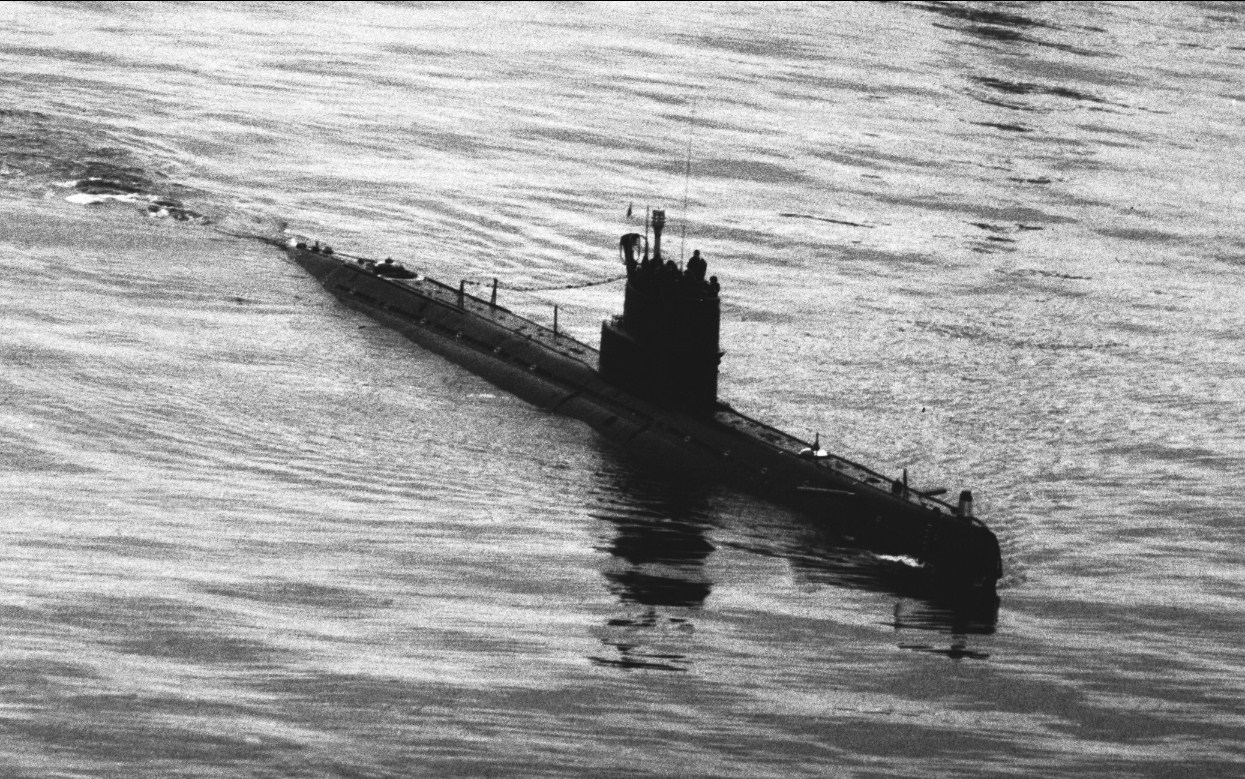
A Whiskey-class submarine similar to the one whose grounding encouraged development of Swedish incident weapons

An incident weapon is typically an anti-vehicle device intended to inflict disabling damage or prevent escape without killing the vehicle operators. Incident weapons were used by military personnel during the Cold War to discourage clandestine use of submarines within territorial waters without causing casualties which might escalate into warfare.

== Historical use ==
The Baltic Sea was a vital access route for Soviet shipping to reach the Atlantic Ocean. Both Warsaw Pact and NATO had a strategic interest in possible blockades of that access. The western shore of the Baltic was controlled by then neutral Sweden. Swedish submarine incidents occurred as foreign submarines explored Swedish territorial waters to assess the feasibility of evading future blockading warships and naval mine fields.

== Examples ==
A variety of nonlethal and less-lethal antisubmarine weapons were implemented in the incident weapon role, some of them being ad-hoc implementations of existing systems such as active sonar and practice depth charges, and others being dedicated, purpose-oriented devices.

=== Active sonar ===
Active sonar pings can be used to communicate with underwater targets in a hostile manner, due to the significant energy of the acoustic pulses. A warship which intercepts an interloper submarine can follow it closely and actively ping it, which causes a highly unpleasant nuisance to the submarine's crew. Active sonar can deafen, incapacitate, or even kill human divers, depending on how powerful it is and how close it is to the target; in a 2023 incident, the Chinese destroyer Ningbo used its active sonar to injure Australian navy divers clearing entangled fishing nets from the screws of the frigate HMAS Toowoomba.

=== Signaling depth charge ===
Depth charges with reduced explosive yield have been used during the Cold War to aggressively communicate with interloper submarines, particularly to communicate that the interloper is detected and vulnerable, and to command the interloper to surface and identify themselves. Such weapons have been variously called SDCs (signaling depth charges) or PDCs (practice depth charges). The use of such charges has been noted in several noteworthy incidents, such as the interception of submarines B-59 and B-130 during the Cuban Missile Crisis. Sweden deployed several incident weapons in 1983 to discourage such exploration after Soviet submarine S-363 ran aground while exploring Swedish waters in 1981.

PDCs were specialized depth charges of comparable size and yield to hand grenades, employed by the United States Navy during the Cold War. Despite the name, they were not used for educational purposes, but instead designed as dedicated incident weapons, to be dropped in clusters over an underwater target in order to harass or lightly damage it. Examples include the American Mark 40 and Mark 155, and the Dutch AX Mark 3, also employed by the United Kingdom.

The United States also developed a modified Hedgehog projectile substituting a magnet and clapper for the explosive charge. If the magnet stuck to the submarine hull, flow along the hull as the submarine moved through the water caused the clapper to oscillate, hammering against the hull.

==== Elma ====
Elma was a small bomb intended to be dropped by aircraft or ships in patterns similar to Hedgehog. If one of these bombs landed on the submerged submarine, a magnet would position it on the hull to focus a shaped charge capable of making a small hole in the pressure hull. The amount of water entering the submarine in shallow coastal waters was intended to encourage the submarine to surface.

==== Malin ====
Malin was similar to Elma, but substituted an acoustic transmitter for the shaped charge to simplify tracking under difficult sonar conditions in coastal waters.

==== Cardoen AS-228 ====
One of the last remaining conventional depth charge systems, still in production during the late 20th century, was the inexpensive Chilean Cardoen AS-228 depth charge, deployable in any variety of methods such as rollers or catapults, or aerial platforms like patrol helicopters. The AS-228 was purchased by the United States and United Kingdom for use as an incident weapon. The weapon possessed a pressure-activated fuze which could be set at anywhere from 30 to 500 m (98 to 1,640 ft), short of the test depth of many submarines of the era. Against submarines of the late Cold War, conventional depth charges were obsolescent and instead saw use as SDCs.

=== Modified lightweight torpedo ===
The standard Swedish Torped 42 40 cm (16 in) anti-submarine torpedo warhead was replaced by a smaller explosive charge intended to merely damage submarine propellers or rudders after acoustic homing.

=== Miniature torpedo ===
Miniature torpedoes possess small warheads and have been developed as a less-lethal alternative to full-size ones. When used against oceangoing submarines, the damage caused by them would be minimal. Some have been developed for feasible use as incident weapons. As an example, the A200 LCAW is a miniature torpedo introduced in 1992 by Whitehead Alenia Sistemi Subacquei (WASS). Designed to be deployable from sonobuoy dispensers, one of the design goals was to have a weapon which bridges the gap between obsolete depth charges and much more expensive full-size torpedoes. With a top speed of less than 18 knots, most submarines would have no difficulty escaping the LCAW, which is part of the functional concept: forcing an unknown underwater target to react and take evasive action, revealing that it's a interloper submarine. The A200 LCAW has been developed into the Black Scorpion, made available in 2021. Both weapons are also potentially lethal against small underwater targets, such as midget submarines, diver propulsion vehicles, human torpedoes, sabotage or espionage-related equipment hauled by frogmen, and the like.

== See also ==
- Defense against swimmer incursions
