= Galina Konovalova =

Konovalova as Avdotya in Children of the Sun (1968)

Galina Lvovna Konovalova (Russian: Галина Львовна Коновалова; 1 August 1916 – 21 September 2014) was a Russian actress known for her work at the Vakhtangov Theatre in Moscow. In 2012, Konovalova debuted in a production of Uncle Vanya on London's West End. Her London performances, which occurred when she was 97 years old, drew new attention to her career, which spanned from the 1930s to 2014.

== Biography ==
Konovalova was born in 1916. She enrolled at the Boris Shchukin Theatre Institute in Moscow when she was 17 years old. Konovalova joined the Vakhtangov Theatre, the parent theater company of Schukin, in 1938. She remained at Vakhtangov for the rest of her career. During World War II, a bomb struck the Vakhtangov Theatre, heavily damaging the building and killing several actors. Konovalova and the rest of the theater's surviving actors were relocated to the Siberian city of Omsk for the next two years. In a 2012 interview with Holly Williams of The Independent, Konovalova fondly recalled her time in Omsk, "I still consider it the best period of my entire life...We were always hungry, we were always cold, but despite all these things we performed there our best performances." Life was so spartan for the actors, that they reported hide wine, cheese and fruit under their clothing during a New Year's Eve Party for the Regional Communist Party Committee in 1942. Konovalova next endured several decades in which Soviet authorities dictated the productions performed at the Vakhtangov. Konovalova stated that, "It was a 'recommendation' from above; a strong recommendation!," but the Vakhtangov "managed to remain, during all those years, a highly intellectual part of society," according to her. Restrictions on theater productions were relaxed in the mid-1950s, while the General Directorate for the Protection of State Secrets in the Press (Glavlit) was abolished in 1991, allowing for more artistic freedom.

Beginning in 2007, Konovalova finally achieved fame with the arrival of a new Lithuanian director, Rimas Tuminas, at the Vakhtangov Theatre. Tuminas cast Konovalova as Marina, a nurse, in his 2009 production of Anton Chekhov's Uncle Vanya when she was 95 years old. Prior to her 2009 casting, Konovalova had performed background roles for most of her career. She told The Independent in 2012, "Before Rimas came, I had an entirely different life...He saw the character in me and gave me work and of course I'm grateful...I have lived all my life in this theatre, spent my youth and all my days here, and my feeling of success does not depend on this success – it depends on everything I have done here. They were maybe tiny, small parts, but I admired every single thing I did." In 2012, Tuminas and Vakhtangov Theatre opened a limited-run production of Uncle Vanya in London's West End. The play was performed in Russian with English subtitles. Galina Konovalova, who was 97 years old at the time, reprised her role of Marina in the London production. She achieved attention for her work on Uncle Vanya in both the United Kingdom and Russia. The Independent noted that her swift success during her late 90s was "still pretty rare to get your big break after 70 years." She expressed no interest in retirement.

Galina Konovalova died on 21 September 2014, at the age of 98. Her late husband, actor Vladimir Osenev, also acted until his death in 1977.
