= Yuri Golov =

Russian footballer

Yuri Golov Юрий Голов
Personal information
- Full name: Yuri Vasilyevich Golov
- Date of birth: 22 July 1937
- Place of birth: Gorky, Russian SFSR, Soviet Union
- Date of death: 9 January 2014 (aged 76)
- Place of death: Nizhny Novgorod, Russia
- Position: Forward

Yuri Vasilyevich Golov (Russian: Юрий Васильевич Голов; 22 July 1937 – 9 January 2014) was a Russian footballer who primarily played as a forward.

Golov played in the Soviet Top League and Soviet First League with FC Volga Gorky. He also played in the Soviet First League with FC Avangard Zhovti Vody and FC Metallurg Kuibyshev.

== Biography ==
Yuri Golov debuted as a professional footballer in 1961 at the age of 25 with the club Raketa Gorky. Three years later, at Volga Gorky, in his first match against FC Dinamo Moscow, he scored the winning goal, at the Dynamo Stadium, against Lev Yashin. He is also the ninth player with the most goals in the club's history, with 26. After four seasons and 156 games played, he was transferred to FC Avanhard for one season. Finally, Yuri Golov retired in 1972 at the age of 36.

Yuri Golov died following a long illness on 9 January 2014, aged 77, in his hometown of Nizhny Novgorod, Russia.

== Clubs ==
Club	Country	Year	Games	Goals
Raketa Gorky	Soviet Union	1961–1963	57	16
Volga Gorky	Soviet Union	1963–1967	156	26
FC Avanhard	Soviet Union	1967–1968	38	5
FC Volga Ulyanovsk	Soviet Union	1968–1971	27	13
