= Benedikt Sarnov =

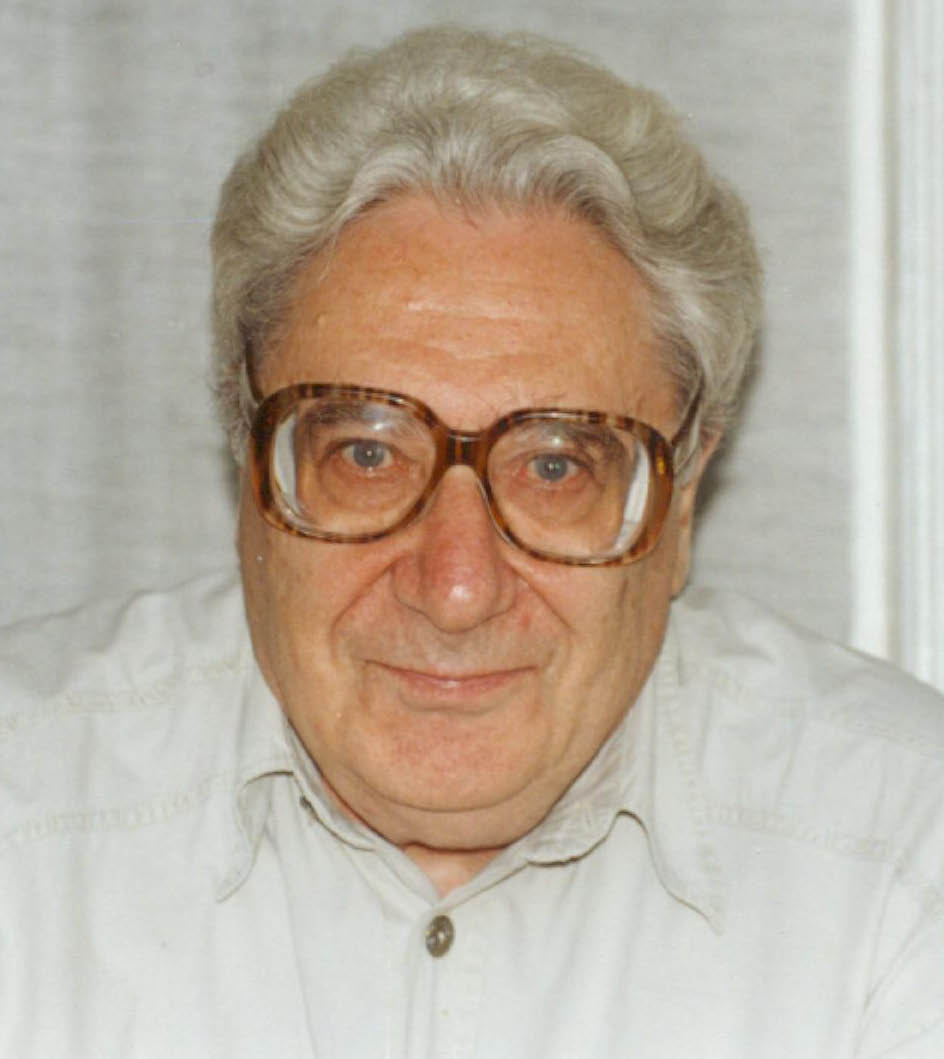
- Benedikt Sarnov, Russian writer
- Born: January 4, 1927; Moscow, Russian SFSR
- Died: April 20, 2014 (aged 87); Moscow, Russia

Benedikt Sarnov (Russian: Бенеди́кт Миха́йлович Сарно́в; January 4, 1927 – April 20, 2014) was a Moscow literary critic, historian of Soviet literature, and writer.

== Biography ==
After graduating from Maxim Gorky Literature Institute in 1951, he became a member of Union of Soviet Writers in 1960. He worked in the magazine Literaturnaya Gazeta, created a popular literary radio program and authored a column about Russian prose in Ogonek. In 1990s he became Secretary of the Moscow Writers' Union, a part of Union of Russian Writers. He has published over twenty books, and hundreds of articles and reviews, and continued to be active in the post-Soviet period. His most recent books were about relationships of Stalin and Soviet writers and other intellectuals He died in 2014.

== Bibliography ==
- Наш советский новояз. Маленькая энциклопедия реального социализма. (Our Soviet Newspeak: A Short Encyclopedia of Real Socialism.) (Moscow: 2002) ISBN 5-85646-059-6
- Перестаньте удивляться: непридуманные истории (Moscow: 1998) has been translated into English and was published under the title Stop Being Surprised! Vignettes from Soviet Literary and Other Life by Infinity Publishing in 2004, ISBN 0-7414-2208-5.
