= Kanholmsfjärden =

Bay in the Stockholm archipelago

Coordinates: 59°20′N 18°47′E

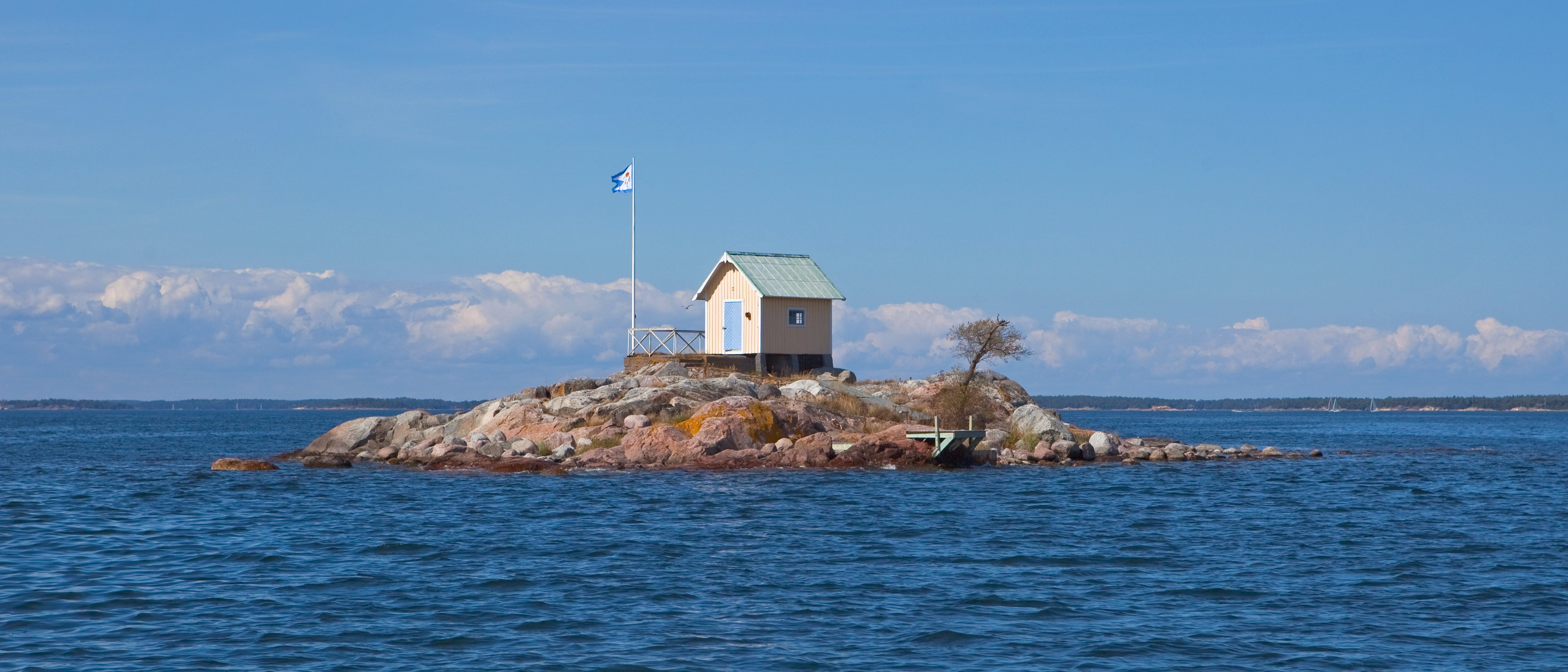
Lilla Gastholmsgrund, located in Kanholmsfjärden.

Kanholmsfjärden is a major bay in the Stockholm archipelago. In October 2014, it was the location where the Swedish Armed Forces conducted a search for an alleged damaged foreign submarine.
