= NS Concord =

Russian oil tanker

History
- Name: NS Concord
- Owner: SCF Novorossiysk Shipping Company, Novorossiysk, Russia
- Port of registry: Liberia
- Builder: Hyundai Heavy Industries, South Korea
- Laid down: 2005
- Launched: 1 February 2005
- Acquired: 20 April 2005
- Identification: Call sign: A8FD7; IMO number: 9299692; MMSI number: 636012382

General characteristics
- Type: Aframax C-Class oil tanker
- Tonnage: 105,902 DWT
- Length: 243.97 m (800 ft 5 in)
- Beam: 42.03 m (137 ft 11 in)
- Depth: 21.00 m (68 ft 11 in)
- Speed: 15 knots (28 km/h; 17 mph)

MV NS Concord is a Russian-owned, Liberian-flagged oil tanker that gained notoriety in 2014 after it was allegedly connected to the submarine search in the Stockholm archipelago.

The oil tanker arrived in the area on 4 October but was later charted as zigzagging across the seas, as if searching for something. The vessel "could be a mothership for a possible submarine," according to Stefan Ring, an expert on military strategies at The Swedish National Defence College. "It is possible to use a ship like this as a mothership for mini submarines. Sailing under another flag could be to hide what they really are doing," Ring said. However, Anders Nordin from the Swedish Coastguard told the news agency TT that NS Concord's movements were consistent with normal tanker movements.

NS Concord belongs to the Russian shipping company SCF Novoship, based in Novorossiysk on the Black Sea. The company is in turn part of the state-owned OAO Sovcomflot, one of the world's largest oil transport companies, whose CEO, Sergei Frank, is a close confidant of Russian president Vladimir Putin.
