= 2022 in Russia =

- Decades: 2000s; 2010s; 2020s
- See also: History of Russia; Timeline of Russian history; List of years in Russia

2022 in Russia is the 31st year of the Russian Federation.

== Leadership ==
- President of Russia: Vladimir Putin
- Prime Minister of Russia: Mikhail Mishustin
- Chairman of the Federation Council: Valentina Matvienko
- Chairman of the State Duma: Vyacheslav Volodin

=== Governors ===
- Amur Oblast: Vasily Orlov (ER)
- Arkhangelsk Oblast: Alexander Tsybulsky (ER)
- Astrakhan Oblast: Igor Babushkin (ER)
- Belgorod Oblast: Vyacheslav Gladkov (ER)
- Bryansk Oblast: Alexander Bogomaz (ER)
- Chelyabinsk Oblast: Alexey Teksler (ER)
- Irkutsk Oblast: Igor Kobzev (ER)
- Ivanovo Oblast: Stanislav Voskresensky (ER)
- Kaliningrad Oblast: Anton Alikhanov (ER)
- Kaluga Oblast: Vladislav Shapsha (ER)
- Kemerovo Oblast: Sergey Tsivilyov (ER)
- Kirov Oblast: Igor Vasilyev (until May 10, ER), Alexander Sokolov (starting May 10, ER)
- Kostroma Oblast: Sergey Sitnikov (ER)
- Kurgan Oblast: Vadim Shumkov (ER)
- Kursk Oblast: Roman Starovoyt (ER)
- Leningrad Oblast: Alexander Drozdenko (ER)
- Lipetsk Oblast: Igor Artamonov (ER)
- Magadan Oblast: Sergey Nosov (ER)
- Moscow Oblast: Andrey Vorobyov (ER)
- Murmansk Oblast: Andrey Chibis (ER)
- Nizhny Novgorod Oblast: Gleb Nikitin (ER)
- Novgorod Oblast: Andrey Nikitin (ER)
- Novosibirsk Oblast: Andrey Travnikov (ER)
- Omsk Oblast: Alexander Burkov (A Just Russia)
- Orenburg Oblast: Denis Pasler (ER)
- Oryol Oblast: Andrey Klychkov (CPRF)
- Penza Oblast: Oleg Melnichenko (ER)
- Pskov Oblast: Mikhail Vedernikov (ER)
- Rostov Oblast: Vasily Golubev (ER)
- Ryazan Oblast: Nikolay Lyubimov (until May 10, ER), Pavel Malkov (starting May 10, Independent / ER ally)
- Sakhalin Oblast: Valery Limarenko (ER)
- Samara Oblast: Dmitry Azarov (ER)
- Saratov Oblast: Valery Radaev (until May 10, ER), Roman Busargin (starting May 10, ER)
- Smolensk Oblast: Alexey Ostrovsky (LDPR)
- Tambov Oblast: Maxim Egorov (ER)
- Tomsk Oblast: Sergey Zhvachkin (until May 10, ER), Vladimir Mazur (starting May 10, ER)
- Tula Oblast: Alexey Dyumin (Independent / ER ally)
- Tver Oblast: Igor Rudenya (ER)
- Tyumen Oblast: Aleksandr Moor (ER)
- Ulyanovsk Oblast: Alexey Russkikh (CPRF)
- Vladimir Oblast: Alexander Avdeyev (ER)
- Volgograd Oblast: Andrey Bocharov (ER)
- Vologda Oblast: Oleg Kuvshinnikov (ER)
- Voronezh Oblast: Alexander Gusev (ER)
- Yaroslavl Oblast: Mikhail Yevrayev (ER)
- Jewish Autonomous Oblast: Rostislav Goldstein (ER)

== Events ==
Ongoing: Russo-Ukrainian war, COVID-19 pandemic in Russia (initially)

- 28 January – 20th Russian Golden Eagle Awards ceremony
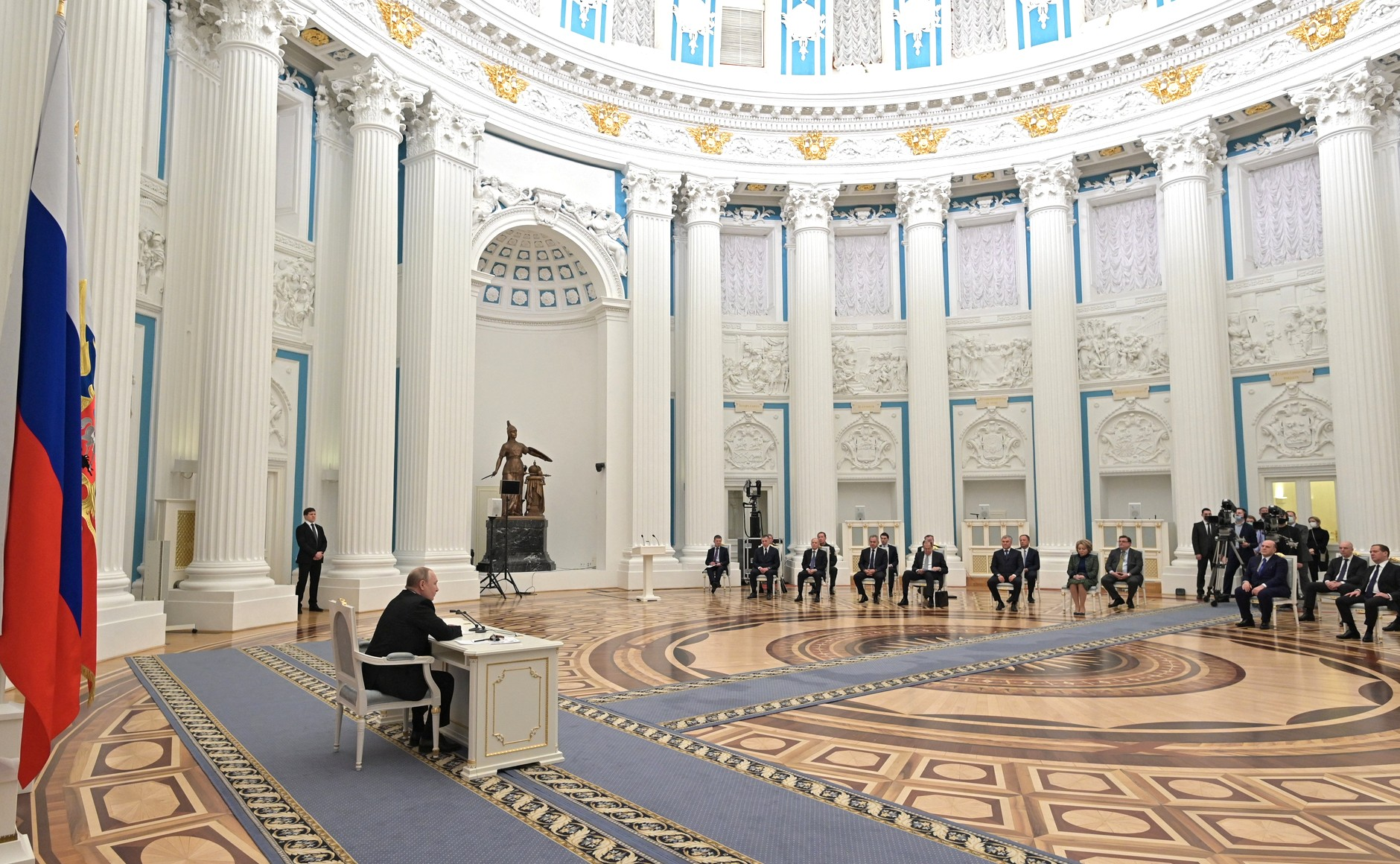
  The Security Council meeting on 21 February 2022
- 3 February – in retaliation to Germany's broadcasting regulator's decision to ban transmission of the Russian state-run RT Deutsch channel over a lack of a broadcasting license, the Russian foreign ministry said that it would shut down Deutsche Welle's Moscow bureau, strip all DW staff of their accreditation and terminate broadcasting of DW in Russia. It also stated that it would begin the procedure of designating DW as a "foreign agent".
- 15 February – The Russian State Duma votes to ask President Vladimir Putin to recognize the self-declared Donetsk and Luhansk People's Republics in Ukraine as independent nations. The bill was proposed by the Communist Party.
- 21 February – Putin announces that Russia has recognized the self-declared Donetsk and Luhansk People's Republics in Ukraine as independent nations. This came after the Duma asked for it a week ago.
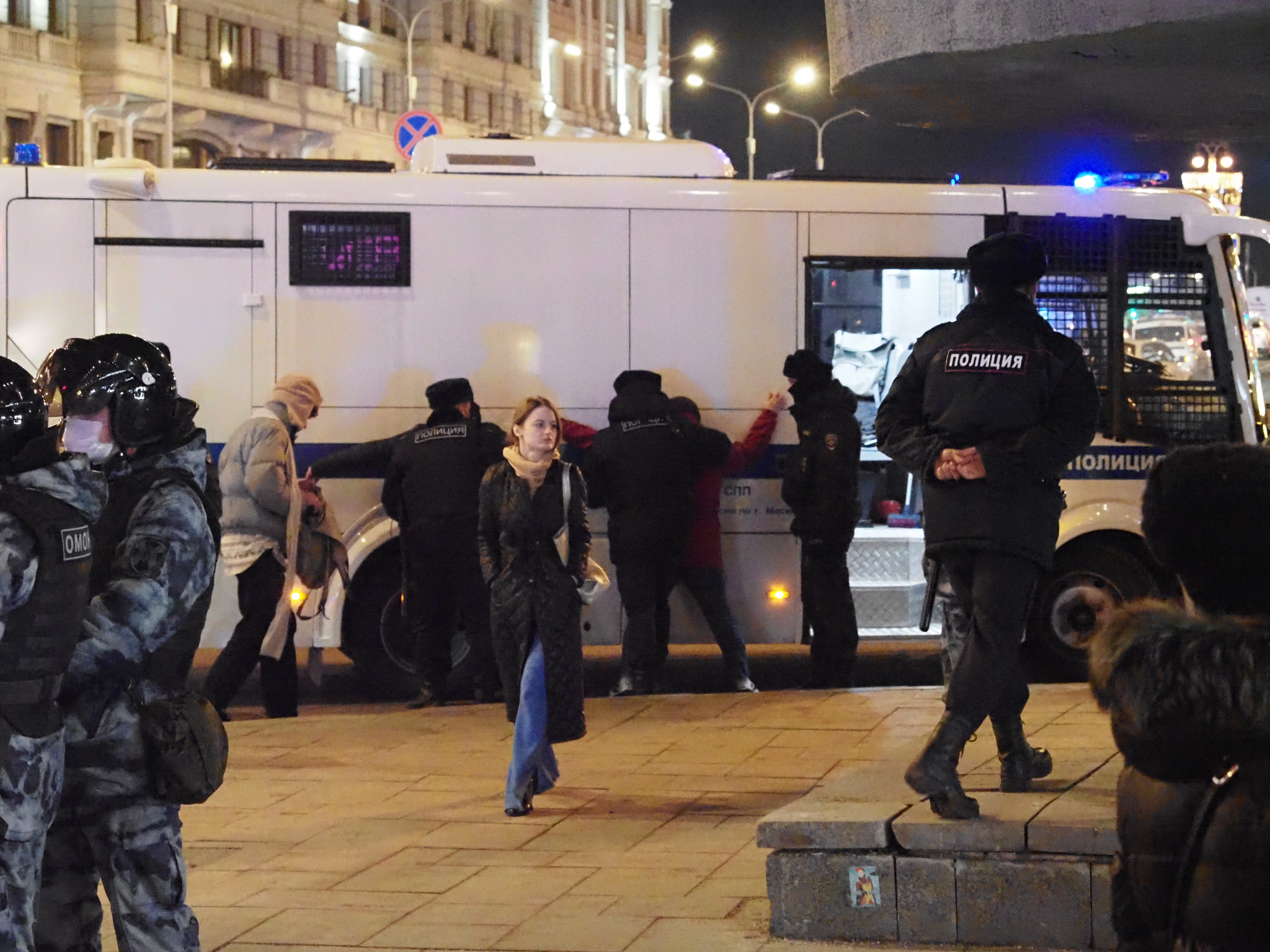
  Arrests at an anti-war protest in Moscow, 24 February 2022
- 24 February – Russia launches a large-scale invasion of Ukraine from Crimea and Belarus.
- 10 March - After Russia was suspended from the Council of Europe in the wake of its 2022 invasion of Ukraine, and subsequently announced its intention to withdraw from the organization, former President (2008–2012) and Prime Minister (2012–2020) Dmitry Medvedev endorsed restoring the death penalty in Russia.
- 16 March 2022 – Russian socialite and food blogger Veronika Belotserkovskaya became the first individual charged under the Russian 2022 war censorship laws.
- 22 March 2022 – Russian television journalist Alexander Nevzorov was charged under the "war censorship" law after he published information that Russian forces shelled a maternity hospital in Mariupol.
- 27 March – Leonid Pasechnik leader of the LPR said that the Luhansk People's Republic may hold a referendum to join Russia in the near future.
- 30 March - A few days later South Ossetian President Anatoly Bibilov announced his intention to begin legal proceedings in the near future to integration with the Russian Federation.
- 22 April 2022 – Russian opposition politician Vladimir Kara-Murza was charged by a Russian court for spreading of false information about the Russian military, due to his 15 March speech to the Arizona House of Representatives, in which he denounced the Russo-Ukrainian war.
- 26 April - Veshkayma kindergarten shooting
- 09 May - President Vladimir Putin presided over the Victory Day parade in Moscow. The parade was scaled down compared to previous years but was conducted to justify and underline the invasion of Ukraine by Russia.
- 16 May - After temporarily closing its restaurants, McDonald's in Russia company decided to exit Russia altogether. the company announced that it would sell all of its restaurants in Russia. It would be replaced by the Russian Vkusno i tochka.
- 8 July – Russian opposition politician Alexei Gorinov was sentenced to 7 years in prison for criticizing the Russo-Ukrainian war.
- 2 August - The Russian Supreme Court declare the Azov Regiment as a terrorist organization.
- 18 August - Russia revives the Soviet-era Mother Heroine award for women with 10 children.
- 21 August - A car bomb kills Darya Dugina, daughter of Alexander Dugin, an ideological advisor of Putin, who was due to travel in the same car.
- 24 August 2022 - Russian opposition politician Yevgeny Roizman was detained by police who said he was being charged with discrediting the military. He had previously been fined three times under the same law.
- 31 August – War-related emigration since the start of Russo-Ukrainian war reached 500,000.
- 18–19 September – A small but significant tornado outbreak affects Ukraine and Russia, killing three people.
- 9 September 2022 - seven council members from Smolninsky District Council in St. Petersburg passed a resolution which called on the State Duma to impeach president Putin for high treason due to his handling of the war in Ukraine. Subsequently, the council was dissolved and the deputies charged with discrediting Russia's military.
- 19 September - the public chambers of the Donetsk People's Republic and Luhansk People's Republic appealed to their heads of state with a request to "immediately" hold a referendum on joining Russia.
- 20 September - the People's Council of the Luhansk People's Republic scheduled a referendum on the republic's entry into Russia as a federal subject for 23–27 September. Soon after, the People's Council of the Donetsk People's Republic announced that the referendum on the entry of the DPR into the Russian Federation would be held on the same date.
- 21 September - President Vladimir Putin announced the 2022 Russian mobilization.
- 26 September - Izhevsk school shooting
- 27 September - 2022 annexation referendums in Russian-occupied Ukraine
  Russian-occupied territories of Ukraine as of 30 September 2022 at the time their annexation was declared
  - According to the results released by Russian occupation authorities in Ukraine, the Donetsk People's Republic, the Luhansk People's Republic, as well as occupied parts of Zaporizhzhia and Kherson Oblasts overwhelmingly vote in favor of annexation, with 99.23%, 98.42%, 93.11% and 87.05% of support, respectively. Turnout exceeded 75% in each region and exceeded 97% in Donetsk Oblast. However, the voting has been widely dismissed as a sham referendum.
- 30 September - President Vladimir Putin signed decrees recognizing the Kherson and Zaporozhye regions as independent territories.
  - Putin announced in a speech that Russia had annexed the four regions occupied during the conflict.
- 5 October - The last native speaker of the Mednyj Aleut language, Gennady Yakovlev, dies at 86 in Kamchatka, making the language extinct.
- 17 October - 2022 Yeysk military aircraft crash
- 23 October - 2022 Irkutsk military aircraft crash
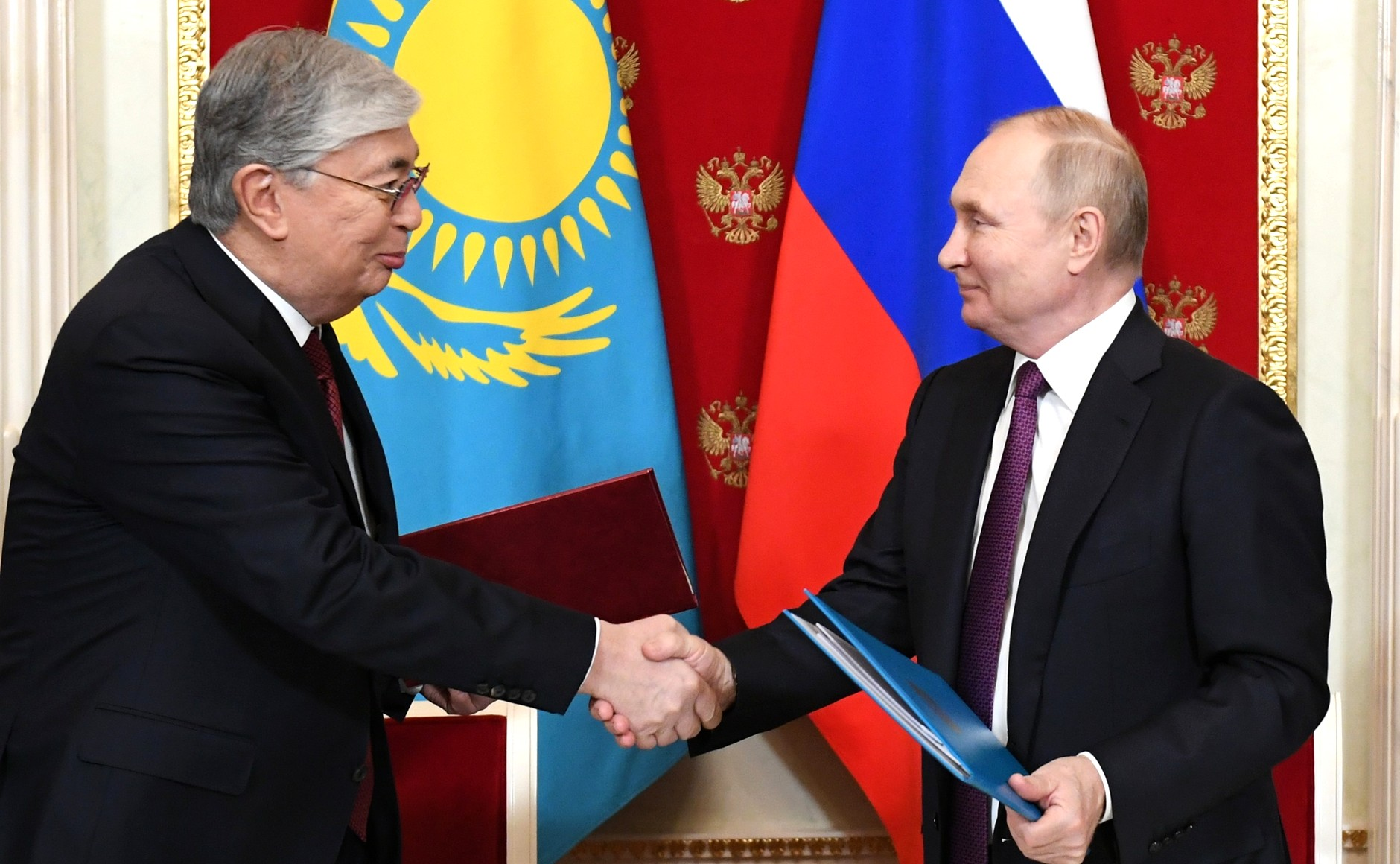
  Vladimir Putin with Kazakh President Kassym-Jomart Tokayev, 28 November 2022
- 27 October - The State Duma unanimously gives preliminary approval to a bill strengthening a law against "propaganda of non-traditional sexual relations". The bill will expand the ban on "propaganda" to all ages, and will outlaw media and online resources, including films, books, and theater productions.
- 5 November - Kostroma café fire
- 24 November - The State Duma passes a bill strengthening a law against "propaganda of non-traditional sexual relations". The bill will expand the ban on "propaganda" to all ages, and will outlaw media and online resources, including films, books, and theater productions.
- 5 December - President Vladimir Putin signs into law the "propaganda of non-traditional sexual relations."
- 8 December - Viktor Bout–Brittney Griner prisoner exchange
- 23 December - 2022 Kemerovo nursing home fire

== Deaths ==
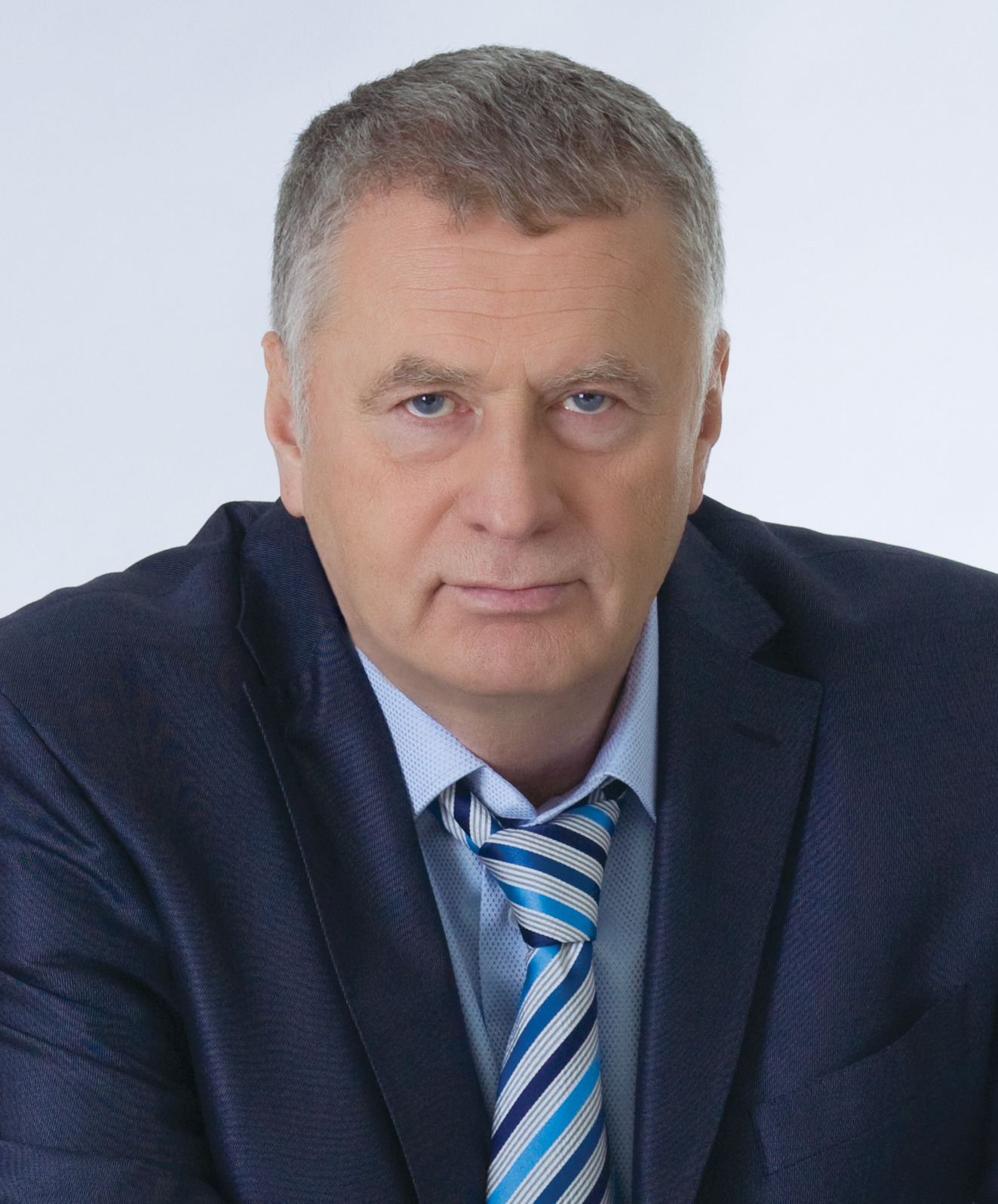
Vladimir Zhirinovsky

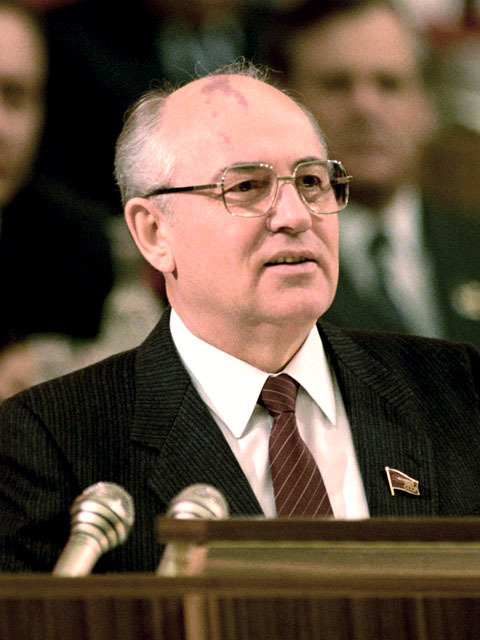
Mikhail Gorbachev

=== January ===
- 3 January – Olga Gavrilova, 64, Russian javelin thrower.
- 5 January – Filza Khamidullin, 86, Russian economist and politician, senator (2003–2005).
- 6 January – Vladimir Gudev, 81, Russian diplomat, Soviet ambassador to Iran (1987–1993), Egypt (1995–2000) and Georgia (2000–2002).
- 7 January –
  - Anatoly Kvashnin, 75, Russian military officer, chief of the general staff (1997–2004), COVID-19.
  - Alexander Timofeevskiy, 88, Russian writer, songwriter and screenwriter (The Stone Flower).
- 8 January –
  - Aleksandr Lebedev-Frontov, 61, Russian painter, collagist, and musician.
  - Viktor Mazin, 67, Russian weightlifter, Olympic champion (1980).
  - Nina Rocheva, 73, Russian cross-country skier, Olympic silver medallist (1980).

=== February ===
- 8 February – Valentina Polukhina, literary scholar (b. 1936).

=== March ===
- 1 March – Alevtina Kolchina, 91, Russian cross-country skier, Olympic champion (1964).
- 4 March – Valentin Knysh, 84, Russian politician, deputy (1995–2003).
- 7 March – Vasily Astafyev, 102, Russian Soviet army colonel.

=== April ===
- 6 April – Vladimir Zhirinovsky, leader of the nationalist far-right party Liberal Democratic Party of Russia (b. 1946).

=== May ===
- 2 May – Yuri Vasenin, 73, Russian football player (Zaria Voroshilovgrad, Soviet Union national team) and manager (Baltika Kaliningrad).
- 4 May – Yuliya Voyevodina, 50, Russian Olympic racewalker (2004).
- 7 May – Yuri Averbakh, 100, Russian chess grandmaster and author.

=== June ===
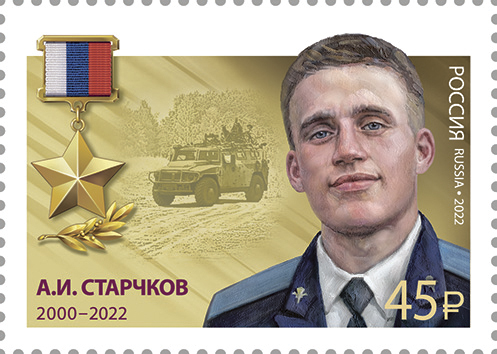
Russian postage stamp honoring a soldier killed during the Russian invasion of Ukraine

- 1 June – Aleksandr Berketov, 46, Russian footballer (Rotor Volgograd, CSKA Moscow).
- 2 June –
  - Andrey Gaponov-Grekhov, 95, Russian physicist.
  - Anatoly Pokrovsky, 91, Russian vascular surgeon.

=== July ===
- 1 July –
  - Yuri Khaliullin, 78, Russian naval officer.
  - Stanislav Leonovich, 63, Russian Olympic figure skater (1980).
- 2 July –
  - Dmitry Kolker, 54, Russian physicist, pancreatic cancer.
  - Leonid Shvartsman, 101, Russian animator (Cheburashka, 38 Parrots, The Scarlet Flower).

=== August ===
- 1 August – Mikhail Golovatov, 72, Russian intelligence officer (KGB).
- 2 August – Nikolay Yefimov, 89, Russian journalist.
- 30 August – Mikhail Gorbachev, the 8th and final leader and 10th and last President of the Soviet Union, Nobel Peace Prize recipient (b. 1931).

=== September ===
- 1 September – Ravil Maganov, 67, Russian petroleum executive (Lukoil), fall.
- 4 September – Boris Lagutin, 84, Russian boxer, Olympic champion (1964, 1968).

=== October ===
- 2 October – Vladimir Kuts, 94, WW II Veteran
- 10 October– Viktor Logunov, 78, Russian track cyclist, Olympic silver medalist (1964).
- 17 October – Yury Klimov, 82, Russian handball player and coach, Olympic champion (1976).

== See also ==
- Outline of the Russo-Ukrainian War
