= Knysh =

Knysh (Ukrainian: Книш) is a Ukrainian-language surname derived from the name of knysh, a traditional pastry. Notable people with this surname include:

- Danylo Knysh (born 1996), Ukrainian football midfielder
- Myhaylo Knysh (born 1983), Ukrainian sprinter
- Olha Knysh (born 1995), Ukrainian alpine skier
- Renald Knysh (1931–2019), Soviet and Belarusian coach in artistic gymnastics
- Valentin Knysh (1937–2022), Russian politician
- Volodymyr Knysh (born 1970), Soviet and Ukrainian footballer
