= Astafyev =

Astafyev is a Russian surname. Notable people with the surname include:

- Maksim Astafyev (born 1982), Russian football player
- Mikhail Astafyev (born 1946), Russian politician
- Vasily Astafyev (1919–2022), Soviet military personnel
- Viktor Astafyev (1924–2001), Soviet and Russian writer of short stories and novels

== See also ==
- 11027 Astafʹev, main-belt asteroid
- Serafina Astafieva
