= 2022 Yeysk Su-34 crash =

Plane crash in Russia

2022 Yeysk military aircraft crash
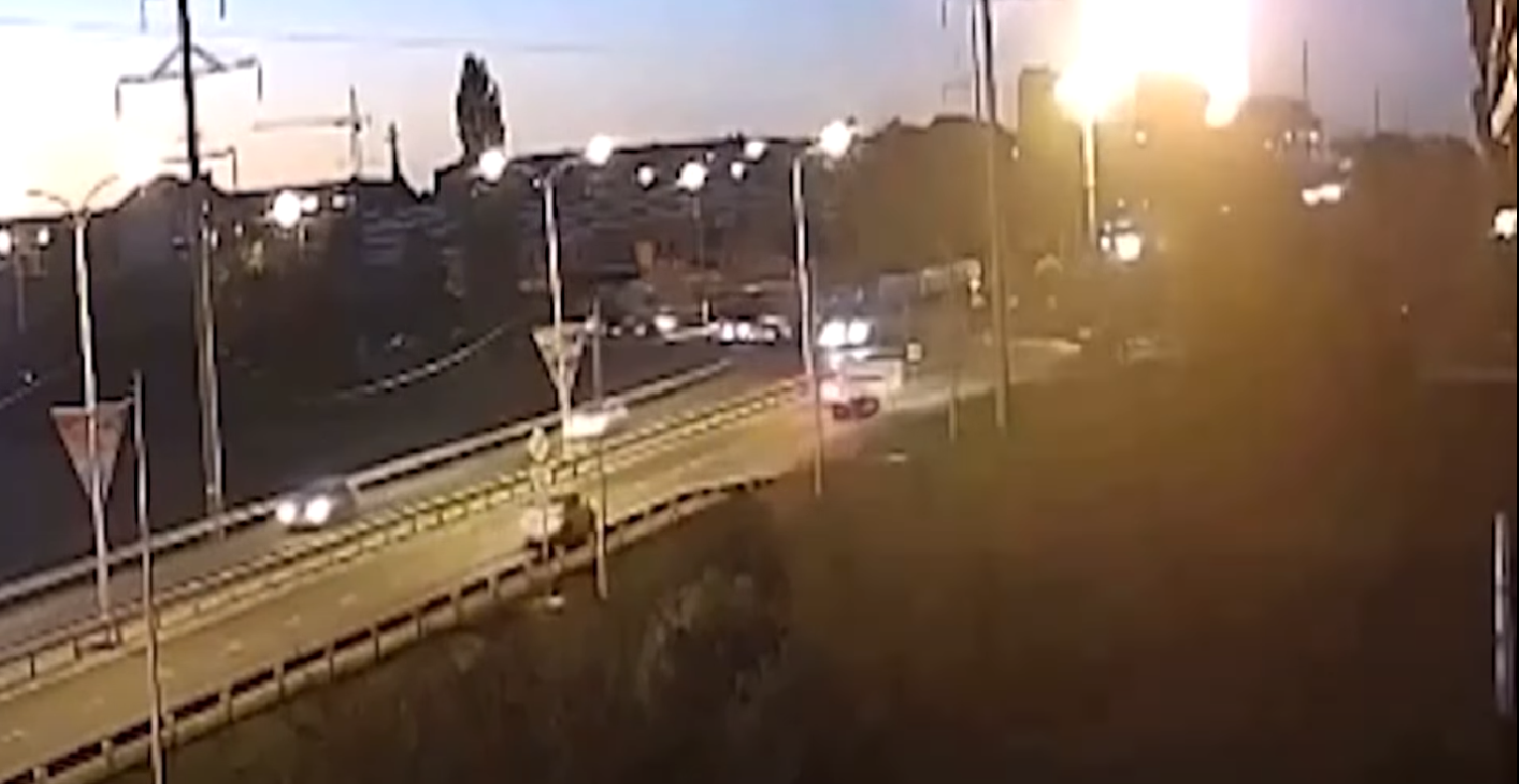
- The fireball visible from the crash into the residential building.

Accident
- Date: 17 October 2022; 18:25 (UTC+03:00)
- Summary: Crashed into an apartment building; fall due to technical failure (preliminary)
- Site: Kommunisticheskaya Street, 20, building 1, Yeysk, Krasnodar Krai, Russia; 46°40′42″N 38°17′44″E
- Total fatalities: 15
- Total injuries: 26

Aircraft
- Aircraft type: Sukhoi Su-34
- Operator: 277th Bomber Aviation Regiment
- Registration: RF-81726 / 20 Red
- Flight origin: Southern Military District airfield
- Occupants: 2
- Crew: 2
- Fatalities: 0
- Survivors: 2

Ground casualties
- Ground fatalities: 15
- Ground injuries: 26

On the evening of 17 October 2022, a Su-34 military aircraft crashed into an apartment building in Yeysk, Krasnodar Krai, Russia.

A large fireball was visible upon impact, causing a fire in the nine-story building, killing 15 people.

== Background ==
The disaster occurred against the backdrop of the 2022 Russian invasion of Ukraine. Sukhoi Su-34 aircraft had been used extensively by Russia during the war. At the same time, journalists noted that the city of Yeysk is located close to Ukraine: 60 kilometres (37 mi) from Mariupol, and 200 kilometres (120 mi) to Bakhmut. However, there was no information in open sources about the use of bombers from the air base in Yeysk.

At the same time, the 859th Center for Combat Use and Retraining of the Flight Personnel of the Naval Aviation of the Navy is located in Yeysk. However, journalists noted that the Su-34 is not in service with the Russian Navy and that it was not previously reported in open sources that it was used to train pilots of naval aviation. But journalists noted that the training complex in Yeysk was also used to train other military pilots.

== Accident ==
The Russian Ministry of Defence reported that the Su-34 fighter-bomber crashed while climbing to perform a training flight. The pilots ejected. They reported that the cause of the crash was the ignition of one of the engines during takeoff. The ministry said fuel caught fire at the crash site.

Information about the crash of the Su-34 aircraft into a multi-storey residential building was received by the Ministry of Emergency Situations at 18:25; the incident occurred on the intersection of Krasnaya (Red) Street and Kommunisticheskaya (Communist) Street.

== Fire ==
The fire damaged at least 17 apartments in the building, according to the Governor of Krasnodar Krai, Veniamin Kondratyev. At the same time, the city's duty dispatch service said that the fire damaged at least 45 apartments. According to the service, the fire completely engulfed one of the entrances, where there was a collapse of the floors from the ninth to the fifth. At the same time, the regional Ministry of Emergency Situations reported that apartments from the first to the fifth floors caught fire after the crash.

At about 20:40 local time, the fire was contained and the remnants of the aircraft were extinguished.

== Victims ==
In the first few hours, there was no accurate information on the victims, since the operational services of the city could not conduct reconnaissance of the burning building due to a strong fire and the continuing danger of explosions.

As of 18 October 2022, 15 dead and 26 injured are known. Families are assisted by 40 psychologists from Krasnodar and Yeysk.

== Analysis ==
According to Ukrainian aviation expert Valery Romanenko, "if the flight had been combat, half of the house would not have been there." He acknowledged the presence of small explosions that were heard after the plane crashed, but suggested that these were either cartridges for a 30-mm cannon or training projectiles. However, he noted the absence of major explosions, despite the fact that the aircraft is capable of taking up to eight tons of bombs.

According to The Bell, this disaster is at least the tenth non-combat loss of Russian aviation since the beginning of the Russian invasion of Ukraine.

== Investigation ==
According to the Telegram channel of the Investigative Committee of Russia, a criminal case has been opened on the crash of the Su-34 aircraft in Yeysk. The department noted that criminologists of the central office of the department were sent to the scene of the incident, the circumstances and causes of the incident are being established.

== See also ==
- 2022 Irkutsk military aircraft crash, a similar incident, in which a military plane crashed into a residential building, six days after the crash in Yeysk.
- 1997 Irkutsk Antonov An-124 crash, another Russian military aircraft that crashed into a residential area
- List of aircraft accidents and incidents by number of ground fatalities
