= Alexander Timofeevskiy =

Russian writer, poet, songwriter, and screenwriter (1933–2022)

- Александр Павлович Тимофеевский
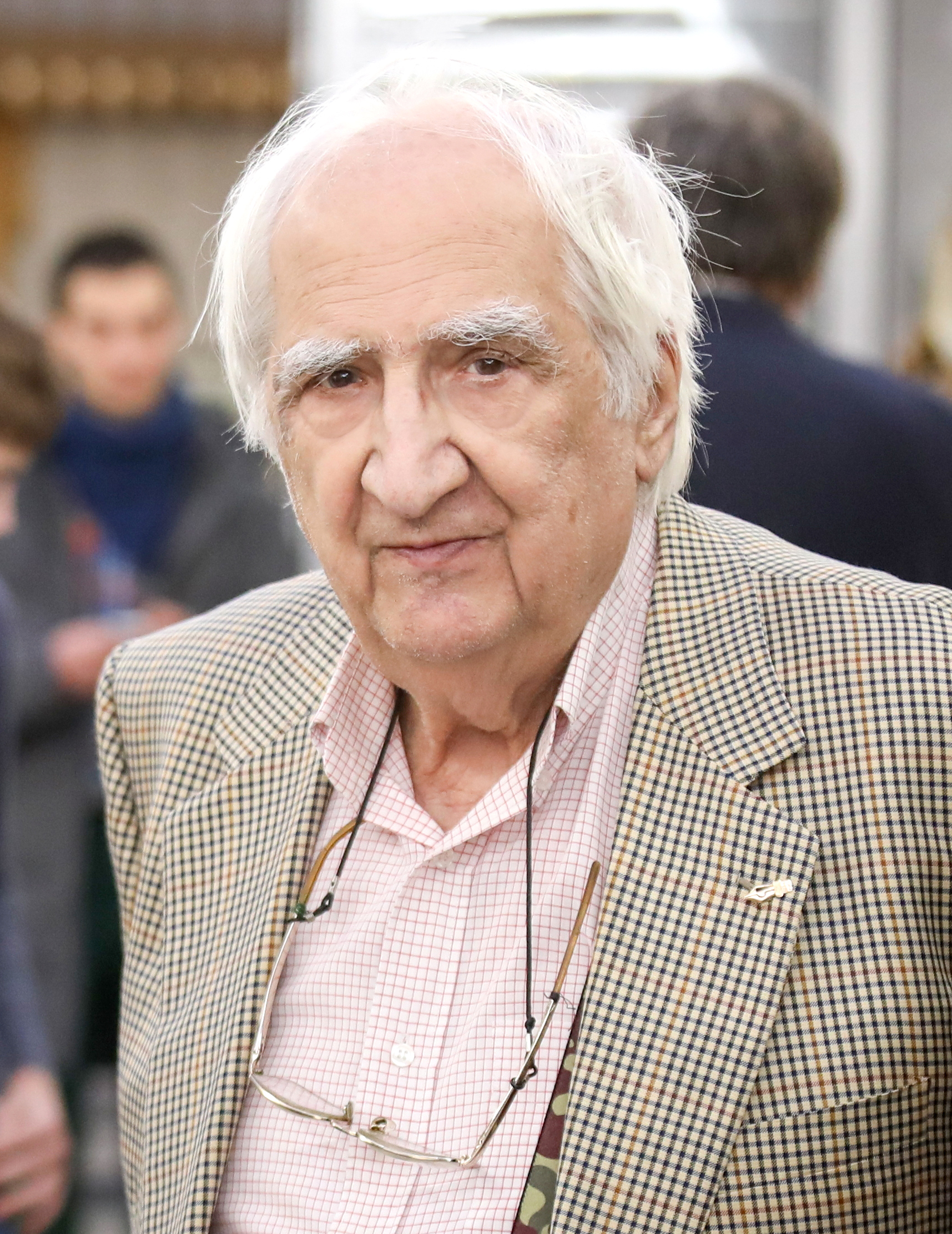
- Born: Alexander Pavlovich Timofeevskiy; 13 November 1933; Moscow, Russian SFSR, USSR
- Died: 7 January 2022 (aged 88); Moscow, Russia
- Other names: Aleksandr Timofeevskiĭ, Aleksandr Timofeyevsky
- Occupation: Writer

Alexander Pavlovich Timofeevskiy (Russian: Александр Павлович Тимофеевский; 13 November 1933 – 7 January 2022) was a Russian writer, poet, songwriter and screenwriter.

== Life and career ==
Born in Moscow, at young age Timofeevskiy lived in Stalingrad, being there during the World War II when the German army besieged the city. After the war he graduated from the Gerasimov Institute of Cinematography and was enrolled in the scriptwriting department of the animation film studio Soyuzmultfilm.

In addition to his cinema works, Timofeevskiy wrote dozens of collections of poems, adult and children's books, radio plays and songs, notably the popular children's song "Песенка крокодила Гены" ("Gena the Crocodile's Song"). In 2020, he was awarded the Na Blago Mira Prize for his book Кулинария эпохи застолья ("Culinary Age of the Tableau Era"). He died in Moscow on 7 January 2022, at the age of 88.
