= Vladimir Kuts (soldier) =

Soviet Army soldier (1927–2022)

- Born: Vladimir Terentevich Kuts; 7 November 1927; Hadiach Raion (now Myrhorod Raion), Poltava Oblast, Ukrainian SSR, USSR
- Died: 2 October 2022 (aged 94); Paris, France
- Military career
- Allegiance: USSR
- Branch: Red Army; United States Army
- Service years: 1942–1945
- Rank: Private
- Nicknames: Waldemar; Willy; Kleiner Stalin ("Little Stalin")
- Units: 4th Infantry Division, United States Army; 5th Guards Airborne Division, 9th Airborne Corps
- Conflicts: World War II

Vladimir Terentevich Kuts (Russian: Владимир Терентьевич Куц; 7 November 1927 – 2 October 2022) was a Russian soldier who is thought to have been the only Soviet citizen to have served with both the Soviet Red Army and the United States Army during World War II.

== Background ==
His father, Terenty Mitrofanovich Kuts, was a civil engineer who built bridges in Kashira, Krasnoyarsk and Dnepropetrovsk. In 1937, he was exiled to Norilsk for 8 years after previous charges of terrorism and anti-Soviet activities were removed. His mother worked as a laundress in the village of Veprik.

=== The beginning of the war ===
In 1941, the village was occupied by the Wehrmacht, and the mother and her son were forced to sell alcohol to the Germans in order to somehow earn a living. In the spring of 1942, policemen arrested Vladimir after they found Soviet leaflets with anti-fascist slogans in German in his house, and sent him as an Ostarbeiter to Germany. On his way to Germany, he fled captivity while in Brest, but was caught again. He was sent to Stuttgart, where he worked for 12 hours per day removing debris at the railway station. In the winter of 1942/1943, Kuts was working with French prisoners of war at a sawmill when he heard on the radio that German troops had been defeated at Stalingrad, after which the French celebrated with Kuts.

== Military service ==
=== U.S. Army ===
In March 1945, a 17-year-old Vladimir met a column of American troops in the village, and then met with a sergeant of the 4th Infantry Division of the US Army, Eugene Melli, a native of Boston who spoke fluent German. Kuts offered the Americans information on German positions, after which Melli offered him the chance to serve in the Army. The squad leader, Corporal Bill Risky, made Kuts, whom the Americans nicknamed “Willie,” as the gunner for the Willys MB jeep. The next day, he took part in his first battle action, attacking two soldiers over a mountain river. Kuts continued his service as a scout, being the first to drive into the villages to ask the locals for information about the presence of German troops and their activities. In April 1945, Kuts was seriously wounded near Dellingen after a shell from a Tiger tank destroyed his jeep, collapsed his jaw and knocked out eight of his teeth. Kuts suffered from stuttering for two months as a result.

After arriving during the liberation of Munich, Kuts set off for the Ens River in the direction of Vienna on 1 May 1945 in a captured Mercedes-Benz car donated by Corporal Risky. On 5 May, he arrived in Linz, and soon after met with units of the Soviet 5th Guards Airborne Division. The Major General in charge instructed the SMERSH detachment to check Kuts.

== Post-war ==
Kuts was sent to the 16th Guards Regiment of SMERSH, where he became a driver and translator in the counterintelligence detachment. So as not to be put on trial, he destroyed documents confirming his service in the American Army. Upon returning to Veprik, Vladimir met with his ill mother as well as visited his father in Norilsk. Soon he joined the Komsomol, and graduated from a graduate school. He then worked as a mechanic at a thermal power plant, and later worked at the Norilsk Mining and Metallurgical Combine named after Andrey Starostin for more than 27 years, organizing the power system of the Norilsk industrial region.

Later, he worked as an authorized representative of the Council of Ministers of the USSR for objects of paramount state importance. In 1988, Kuts retired, receiving the status of a pensioner of republican significance. After surviving a second heart attack in the Central Clinical Hospital, he told one of the ministers about his service, after which he met with the leadership of the KGB in 1988 and told the whole truth. As a result, the KGB allowed Kuts to fly to the United States to find former colleagues and a year later, he met with Melli and Risky in Philadelphia. He was issued an American war veteran's certificate, and the president of the Association of Veterans of the 4th Division, Harry Gram, appointed Kuts a lifetime honorary member of the association. In 1989, another fellow soldier handed over his Purple Heart medal to Kuts. In 2015, he attended the Moscow Victory Day Parade.

Kuts died in Paris on 2 October 2022, at the age of 94.

== Awards and decorations ==
- Order of the Patriotic War II degree
- Veteran of Labor Medal
- Medal "For the Victory over Germany in the Great Patriotic War 1941–1945"
- Medal "Defender of Free Russia"
- Purple Heart (United States)
- Labor Veteran of the Norilsk Combine
- Honorary Veteran of the Krasnoyarsk Territory
- Honorary Veteran of the City of Moscow
- Honorary Citizen of the State of Texas
- Veteran of the Airborne Forces of the Soviet Army (8 November 2016)

== See also ==
- Joseph Beyrle
