= Veronika Belotserkovskaya =

Russian writer and editor

Veronika Belotserkovskaya Вероника Белоцерковская
- Born: Veronika Borisovna Protopopova; 25 June 1970 (age 56); Odesa, Ukrainian SSR, Soviet Union
- Education: Saint Petersburg State Institute of Technology
- Occupations: Publisher; entrepreneur; cook; writer; TV presenter; blogger; photographer
- Spouses: Yan Antonyshev (divorced) Boris Belotserkovsky (m. 2000; div. 2017)
- Children: 3

Veronika Borisovna Belotserkovskaya (Note: Russian: Вероника Борисовна Белоцерковская; Ukrainian: Вероніка Борисівна Білоцерківська, romanized: Veronika Borysivna Bilotserkivska) (née Protopopova; (Note: Russian and Ukrainian: Протопопова) born 25 June 1970) is a Russian journalist, media manager, blogger, TV presenter, publisher and entrepreneur, author of popular cookbooks. She has also been a publisher at Sobaka.ru and also owns a culinary school in southern France.

== Biography ==
Belotserkovskaya was born on 25 June 1970 in Odesa in the family of an engineer and a teacher of the Russian language. She attended the Saint Petersburg State Institute of Technology and later the High Courses for Scriptwriters and Film Directors.

Prior to 2003, Belotserkovskaya had been involved in television advertising and served as co-owner and general director of Trend St. Petersburg. She once owned the Moscow and Saint Petersburg versions of Time Out before selling them to "C-Media" in 2014. A video version of the culinary recipes of Veronika Belotserkovskaya was released on the Domashny TV channel. In 2014, Belotserkovskaya starred in the ironic video clip of the Leningrad song "Patriotka".

In mid-2010s, Belotserkovskaya started a culinary blog on the blog hosting platform LiveJournal. Her vivid photos and recipes were mixed with everyday lifestyle notes. Soon, the blog attracted millions of followers. Belotserkovskaya developed the passion for cooking into further projects such as exclusive gastronomic tours and cooking classes with world top chefs in Provence, Tuscany, Piedmont and Sicily. By 2021, she had published several cookbooks, all of which were bestsellers.

== Russian invasion of Ukraine ==
Belotserkovskaya publicly condemned Russian invasion of Ukraine via her social network accounts, mainly in Instagram.

On 16 March 2022, Belotserkovskaya became the first individual charged under the "fake news law" in absentia in relation to the war in Ukraine. Belotserkovskaya herself learned about the criminal case “from Telegram channels”. In April 2022, authorities seized Belotserkovskaya’s property in Russia.

On 6 February 2023, she was sentenced in absentia to nine years incarceration as well as being banned from operating a website for a further five years following the end of her incarceration.

== Personal life ==
Belotserkovskaya was first married to artist Yan Antonyshev with whom she had a son. Her second husband was businessman Boris Belotserkovsky. They had two sons before divorcing in 2017. Belotserkovskaya currently lives in southern France.

== Cookbooks ==
- Retseptyshi — Atticus Publishing Group, KoLibri — 2009 (ISBN 978-5-389-00722-2)
- Dietyshi — KoLibri — 2010 (ISBN 978-5-389-00805-2, 978-5-389-01142-7)
- About Food. About Wine. Provence — Eksmo — 2011 (ISBN 978-5-699-53546-0)
- Gastronomic Retseptyshi — Eksmo — 2012 (ISBN 978-5-699-58598-4)
- Made in Italy. Gastronomic Recipes. In Two Volumes — Eksmo — 2013 (ISBN 978-5-699-66869-4)
