= Anisimova Polyana =

Anisimova Polyana Анисимова Поляна
- Selo
- Location within Bashkortostan Location within Russia
- Coordinates: 54°58′N 53°51′E
- Country: Russia
- Region: Bashkortostan
- District: Sharansky District
- Time zone: UTC+5:00

Anisimova Polyana (Russian: Анисимова Поляна) is a rural locality (a selo) in Pisarevsky Selsoviet, Sharansky District, Bashkortostan, Russia. The population was 83 as of 2010. There is 1 street.

== Geography ==
Anisimova Polyana is located 22 km northwest of Sharan (the district's administrative centre) by road. Starodrazhzhevo is the nearest rural locality.
