= Kostroma café fire =

2022 conflagration in Russia

- Date: 5 November 2022
- Time: 2:37 (MSK)
- Location: Kostroma, Kostroma Oblast, Russia; 57°45′50″N 40°58′26″E
- Cause: Firing of a flare gun
- Deaths: 15
- Injuries: 9
- Missing: 4
- Suspects: Stanislav Ionkin

In the early hours of 5 November 2022, a fire occurred at the Poligon café in the city of Kostroma, Kostroma Oblast, Russia. The fire killed 15 people and injured 9 others. 250 other people were evacuated. The cause of the fire was reported to be the firing of a flare gun.

== Incident ==
At around 2:00 in the morning, a fire was reported at the Poligon café in Kostroma, prompting more than 50 firefighters to extinguish the fire using more than 20 fire engines. According to witnesses and governor Sergey Sitnikov, a drunk man who was courting with a woman ordered her flowers and fired a flare gun in the dance floor. The subsequent fire spread through more than 3,500 square meters and caused the building's roof to collapse. The inside of the building was almost completely destroyed. Thirteen bodies were initially found, but the remains of two people were discovered later.

Most of the emergency exits in the club were blocked. Firefighters were forced to break down the doors to gain entry to the club. One of the doors was broken down by a club patron, Andrey Kuzmin, and this allowed dozens of people to escape. According to eyewitnesses, the fire alarm did not go off after the fire started. Emergency services later reported that most of the bodies were found in the smoking room, utility room, and near the toilets.

== Investigation ==
Immediately after the fire, police opened a criminal investigation into the cause of the fire and police searched for the man who fired the flare gun. The man was later arrested and a case for "causing death by negligence" was opened against him.

== Suspect and other arrests ==
Police arrested 23-year-old reservist soldier Stanislav Ionkin, who had just returned from his service in the Russo-Ukrainian war. State-run media later reported that the suspect had admitted to the charges. A relative said that he had been sent back to Russia from Ukraine after being wounded in action.

On 11 November 2022, a court in Moscow ordered the arrest of the owner of the café and the company which managed Poligon. They were both identified as Ikhtiyar Mirzoev and Natalya Belenogova, respectively.

In March 2024, Ionkin was sentenced to 20 years in prison and stripped of his distinguished service.

== Reactions ==
Immediate reactions came from Sergey Sitnikov, governor of Kostroma Oblast, who offered condolences on his Telegram channel to the victims' families and friends and said that they were being provided with assistance.
