= Filza Khamidullin =

Russian economist and politician (1936–2022)

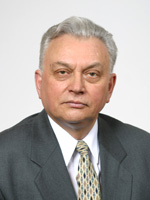
- Khamidullin in 2003

Russian Federation Senator from the Republic of Tatarstan
- In office 11 April 2003 – 11 May 2005
- Preceded by: Rafgat Altynbayev
- Succeeded by: Ekzam Gubaydullin

Personal details
- Born: Filza Garifovich Khamidullin; 3 January 1936 Kazan, Tatar ASSR, RSFSR, Soviet Union
- Died: 5 January 2022 (aged 86) Kazan, Tatarstan, Russia

Filza Garifovich Khamidullin (Russian: Фильза Гарифович Хамидуллин; 3 January 1936 – 5 January 2022) was a Russian economist and politician.

== Biography ==
He was born on January 3, 1936, in Kazan. In 1958, he graduated from the Kazan State Financial and Economic Institute, and later completed postgraduate studies at the Moscow Technological Institute of the Meat and Dairy Industry. Beginning in 1958, he worked as an instructor for the Tatar Regional Committee of the Komsomol (All-Union Leninist Young Communist League), and in 1958–1959, served as secretary of the Sovetsky District Committee of the Komsomol in Kazan.

He taught at the Kazan State Financial and Economic Institute named after Kuibyshev (KGFEI), where he eventually became head of the Department of Sectoral Economics. From 1980 to 1990, he served as rector of the institute. He held a Doctor of Economic Sciences degree (since 1981), was a professor, and an academician of the Academy of Sciences of the Republic of Tatarstan (since 2010). He also served as an advisor to the Presidium of the Academy of Sciences of the Republic of Tatarstan.

From 1990 to 1995, he held the position of Deputy Chairman of the Council of Ministers of the Tatar Autonomous Soviet Socialist Republic (TASSR), as well as Deputy Prime Minister and Chairman of the State Committee for Economy and Forecasting of the Republic of Tatarstan. In 1995, he was appointed State Advisor to the President of the Republic of Tatarstan on socio-economic issues.

By Presidential Decree of the Republic of Tatarstan No. UP-206 dated April 16, 1993, F. G. Khamidullin was included in the newly established Presidential Commission on State Prizes of the Republic of Tatarstan in the field of science and technology.

By resolution of the Federation Council dated April 23, 2003, the authority of F. G. Khamidullin as a member of the Federation Council — representative of the executive authority of the Republic of Tatarstan — was confirmed as of April 11, 2003.

From April 2003 to March 2004, he was a member of the Federation Council Committee on Budget and, from March 2004, served as Deputy Chairman of the committee.

By resolution of the Federation Council dated May 11, 2005, Khamidullin's powers were terminated.

Since 2006, he was a member of the Public Chamber of the Republic of Tatarstan and chaired the Commission on Economic Policy and Implementation of Priority Programs of the Republic of Tatarstan.

He died on January 5, 2022, in Kazan at the age of 86. President of the Republic of Tatarstan Rustam Minnikhanov, the Presidium of the Academy of Sciences of the Republic of Tatarstan, and the leadership of Kazan University expressed their condolences. The farewell ceremony took place at the building of the Academy of Sciences, and Khamidullin was buried at the Novo-Tatar Cemetery.
