= Nikolay Yefimov (politician) =

Russian journalist and statesman (1932–2022)

- Николай Ефимов

Chairman of the USSR State Press Committee
- In office 17 July 1989 – 30 July 1990
- Preceded by: Mikhail Nenashev (as Chairman of the USSR State Committee for Publishing, Printing and Book Trade)
- Succeeded by: Mikhail Nenashev

Personal details
- Born: Nikolay Ivanovich Yefimov; 9 December 1932 Moscow, Russian SFSR, Soviet Union
- Died: 2 August 2022 (aged 89) Moscow, Russia
- Party: CPSU
- Education: MSU Faculty of Journalism
- Occupation: Journalist

Nikolay Ivanovich Yefimov (Russian: Николай Иванович Ефимов; 9 December 1932 – 2 August 2022) was a Russian journalist and statesman. A member of the Communist Party of the Soviet Union, he served as Chairman of the USSR State Press Committee from 1989 to 1990. In 1990-1991 he served as editor-in-chief of Izvestia newspaper.

Yefimov died in Moscow on 2 August 2022, at the age of 89.
