= 2022 Irkutsk Sukhoi Su-30 crash =

Plane crash in Russia

2022 Irkutsk military aircraft crash
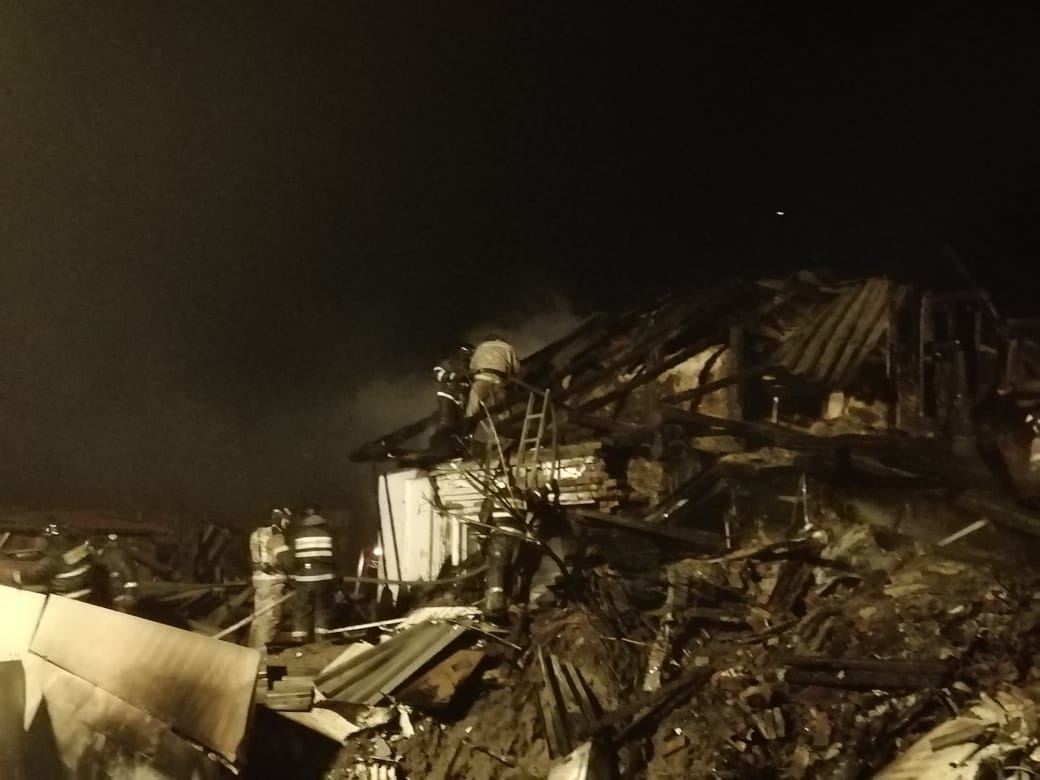
- Destroyed building after the plane crash

Accident
- Date: 23 October 2022
- Summary: Crashed into a residential building; Under investigation
- Site: 2nd Sovietsky Lane, building 4, Irkutsk, Irkutsk Oblast, Russia; 52°19′59″N 104°11′55″E
- Total fatalities: 2
- Total injuries: 1

Aircraft
- Aircraft type: Sukhoi Su-30SM
- Flight origin: Irkutsk Northwest Airport
- Occupants: 2
- Crew: 2
- Fatalities: 2
- Survivors: 0

Ground casualties
- Ground fatalities: 0
- Ground injuries: 1

At about 17:30 local time on 23 October 2022, a Su-30 crashed in the city of Irkutsk in eastern Russia. The Su-30SM aircraft was performing a test flight when it fell on a wooden two-story residential building in 2nd Sovetsky Lane. Both the pilots were killed. The residents of the house were not hurt as they were not home.

== Background ==
The accident occurred six days after another plane crash into a residential building in Yeysk. BBC correspondents noted that both planes belong in general to the same family - they were created by deep modernization of the Soviet Sukhoi Su-27 fighter.

== Crew ==
Maxim Vyacheslavovich Konyushin — a professional test pilot. He participated in the testing of more than 30 aircraft models. Born in Primorye. He graduated from the Zhukovsky Air Force Engineering Academy with a degree in aircraft testing. He was awarded medals of the Ministry of Defense of the Russian Federation "For Distinction in Military Service" III, II and I degree. He bore the title of "Honored Test Pilot of the Russian Federation".

Viktor Viktorovich Kryukov — test pilot of the third class, military pilot of the second class. A native of Ukraine. Graduated from the Krasnodar Military Aviation Institute.

== Crash ==
On the evening of 23 October 2022, test flights of two Su-30SMs took place over the Irkutsk-2 airfield. One plane landed safely at the airport, while contact with the other plane was lost. The plane crashed on a residential building in 2nd Sovietsky Lane. The five people (two families) who lived in the house weren't home at the time of the crash. Two pilots of the plane were killed. A fire later broke out, injuring a firefighter. According to local authorities, 150 houses were left without electricity after the plane crash.

== Investigation ==
The Investigative Committee of Russia opened a criminal case under article 263 of the Criminal Code (“Violation of the rules for traffic safety and operation of air transport”). A commission has been set up to investigate the crash. In the Leninsky district of Irkutsk, a municipal emergency regime was introduced.

The investigation considers two versions of the causes of the disaster - crew errors and equipment failure. It is reported that the crew could have lost consciousness during the flight due to a malfunction of the oxygen equipment or depressurization.

== See also ==
- 1997 Irkutsk Antonov An-124 crash
- 2022 Yeysk military aircraft crash
