= Vasily Astafyev =

Soviet veteran of World War II (1919–2022)

- Василий Михайлович Астафьев
- Astafyev in c. 2000
- Born: 25 October 1919; Voronovy-Otruba, Tambovsky Uyezd, Tambov Governorate, Russian SFSR
- Died: 7 March 2022 (aged 102); Perm, Russia
- Military career
- Allegiance: Soviet Union; Russia
- Branch: Soviet Army
- Service years: 1939–1966
- Rank: Colonel
- Conflicts: World War II; Winter War; Eastern Front
- Awards: Hero of the Soviet Union; Order of Lenin; Order of Alexander Nevsky; Order of the Red Star
- Other work: Politician; Signatory

Vasily Mikhailovich Astafyev (Russian: Василий Михайлович Астафьев; 25 October 1919 – 7 March 2022) was a Soviet officer, and was a participant in the Winter War, as well as the Eastern Front. He was deputy commander of the 104th Guards Separate Sapper Battalion of the 89th Guards Rifle Division of the 37th Army of the Steppe Front, as guard captain. He received the title of Hero of the Soviet Union on 20 December 1943.

== Early life ==
Astafyev was born on 25 October 1919 in the village of Voronovy-Otruba, in what is now the Tokaryovsky District of Tambov Oblast.

In 1936, after graduating from 7 classes, he attended the workers' faculty of the Tambov Pedagogical Institute where he graduated in 1938, and later worked as a rural teacher.

== Military career ==
=== World War II ===
In 1939, he enlisted in the Red Army, and participated in the Winter War. In 1941, he graduated from the Borisov Military Engineering School, in which during that time Operation Barbarossa was launched. He was immediately sent to the battlefront, where he fought on the South-West, Steppe, 2nd Ukrainian, and 1st Belorussian Fronts. In 1943, he joined the CPSU.

Astafyev served as the commander of an engineer platoon, company, battalion, and a rifle division. He took part in the battles near Moscow and Stalingrad, in the Oryol-Kursk, Yasso-Kishinev, Vistula-Oder and Berlin operations. He was deputy commander of the 104th Guards Separate Sapper Battalion (89th Guards Rifle Division, 37th Army, Steppe Front) of the Guards. Astafyev especially distinguished himself when crossing the Dnieper River on 1–6 October 1943 south of the city of Kremenchug, in the Poltava region of Ukraine. Under the continuous enemy fire of the guard, he led the crossing of the rifle subunits. As a result, twenty 76-millimeter and forty 45-millimeter cannons, thirty-eight mortars, twenty heavy machine guns, and 1,625 soldiers were transported.

By the decree of the Presidium of the Supreme Soviet of the USSR of 20 December 1943, for the exemplary fulfillment of combat missions of the command on the front of the struggle against the Nazi invaders and the courage and heroism of the guards shown at the same time, Astafyev was awarded the title of Hero of the Soviet Union with the combined award of the Order of Lenin and the Gold Star medal.

=== Post war ===
After the war, Astafyev continued to serve in the army. In 1950 he graduated from the Higher Officers' Engineering School in Nakhabino village, Moscow Region. From 1950 to 1951, he was a regimental engineer of an air defense division in Kyiv. From 1951 to 1960, he served as an engineer of the anti-aircraft artillery division of the air defense in Magnitogorsk. From 1960 to 1966, he was Chief of the Engineering Service of the 20th Air Defense Corps of the Ural Air Defense Army in Perm.

From 1966, he was in the reserves.

== Later life ==
After his retirement from the military, he resided in the city of Perm. From 1967 to 1987, he worked in the Perm regional road administration.

In 1989 he was elected People's Deputy of the USSR and was a member of the All-Union Council of War and Labor Veterans, the Perm Section of the Great Patriotic War veterans and commander of the regional military sports games.

In December 1991, he was one of those who signed an appeal to the President of the USSR, Mikhail Gorbachev, and the Supreme Soviet of the USSR with a proposal to convene an extraordinary Congress of People's Deputies of the Soviet Union.

From 1991, Astafyev was appointed chairman of the Perm regional branch of the Russian Peace Foundation. In 1994, he was appointed honorary chairman of the organisation.

Astafyev turned 100 on 25 October 2019, and died in Perm on 7 March 2022, at the age of 102.

== Awards ==
Hero of the Soviet Union (20 December 1943)
Order of Friendship (25 October 1999)
Order of Lenin (20 December 1943)
Order of the Red Banner (20 February 1945)
Order of Alexander Nevsky (19 June 1945)
Medal of Zhukov (1994)
Medal "For Courage" (23 August 1943)
Order of the Red Star, twice (14 March 1943,?)
Medal "For Battle Merit"
Medal "For the Defence of Stalingrad" (1942)
Medal "For the Defence of Moscow" (1944)
Medal "For the Liberation of Warsaw" (1945)
Medal "For the Capture of Berlin" (1945)
Medal "For the Victory over Germany in the Great Patriotic War 1941–1945" (1945)

- jubilee medals
- Honorary Citizen of Perm (1996)
- Honorary Citizen of the Perm Territory (1997)
- Winner of the Stroganov Prize in the category "For Honor and Dignity" (2015)
