= Valentin Knysh =

Russian politician (1937–2022)

Member of the State Duma
- In office 17 December 1995 – 29 December 2003

Personal details
- Born: Valentin Filippovich Knysh; 20 September 1937 Komsomolsk-on-Amur, Far Eastern Krai, Russian SFSR, Soviet Union
- Died: 4 March 2022 (aged 84)
- Party: KPRF
- Education: Amur State University of Humanities and Pedagogy

Valentin Filippovich Knysh (Russian: Валентин Филиппович Кныш; 20 September 1937 – 4 March 2022) was a Russian politician. A member of the Communist Party of the Russian Federation, he served in the State Duma from 1995 to 2003.

Knysh died on 4 March 2022, at the age of 84.
