= 2022 Ryazan Oblast gubernatorial election =

- 9–11 September 2022
- Turnout: 42.92%
		CPRF
Nominee	Pavel Malkov	Denis Sidorov
Party	United Russia	CPRF
Popular vote	320,976	21,560
Percentage	84.55%	5.68%
Governor before election
Pavel Malkov (acting)
Independent
Elected Governor
Pavel Malkov
United Russia

The 2022 Ryazan Oblast gubernatorial election took place on 9–11 September 2022, on common election day. Acting Governor Pavel Malkov was elected to a full term.

== Background ==
State Duma member Nikolay Lyubimov was appointed Governor of Ryazan Oblast in February 2017, replacing two-term Governor Oleg Kovalyov. In September 2017 Lyubimov won election for a full term with 80.16% of the vote.

Lyubimov, a Kaluga native, failed to make connections with local elite, and his governance was also described as problematic. On 10 May 2022 Nikolay Lyubimov asked for his resignation along four other governors, Rosstat Head Pavel Malkov was appointed acting Governor of Ryazan Oblast.

Due to the start of the Russian invasion of Ukraine in February 2022 and subsequent economic sanctions the cancellation and postponement of direct gubernatorial elections was proposed. The measure was even supported by A Just Russia leader Sergey Mironov. Eventually, on 10 June Ryazan Oblast Duma called the gubernatorial election for 11 September 2022.

== Candidates ==
Only political parties can nominate candidates for gubernatorial election in Ryazan Oblast, self-nomination is not possible. However, candidates are not obliged to be members of the nominating party. Candidate for Governor of Ryazan Oblast should be a Russian citizen and at least 30 years old. Each candidate in order to be registered is required to collect at least 7% of signatures of members and heads of municipalities (199-208 signatures). Also gubernatorial candidates present 3 candidacies to the Federation Council and election winner later appoints one of the presented candidates.

=== Registered ===
- Pavel Malkov (United Russia), acting Governor of Ryazan Oblast, former Head of Rosstat (2018-2022)
- Grigory Parsentyev (SR-ZP), Member of Ryazan Oblast Duma
- Dmitry Repnikov (LDPR), Member of Ryazan City Duma
- Natalya Rubina (RPPSS), Member of Ryazan Oblast Duma
- Denis Sidorov (CPRF), Member of Ryazan Oblast Duma

=== Did not file ===
- Andrey Yeryomenko (Rodina), chairman of Rodina regional office

=== Eliminated in primary ===
- Inna Kalashnikova (United Russia), chair of Ryazan Oblast Union of Trade Unions
- Aleksandr Kopeykin (United Russia), chief trauma surgeon at Ryazan Oblast Hospital

=== Declined ===
- Dmitry Pankin (LDPR), Deputy Chairman of Ryazan City Duma

=== Candidates for Federation Council ===
Incumbent Senator Irina Petina was not renominated.

- Pavel Malkov (United Russia):
  - Nikolay Lyubimov, former Governor of Ryazan Oblast (2017-2022)
  - Larisa Pastukhova, Provost of Russian State University for the Humanities
  - Olga Postnikova, nonprofit executive
- Grigory Parsentyev (SR-ZP):
  - Aleksandr Averin, chairman of Zakhar Prilepin Guard regional office
  - Gennady Ignatov, retired Russian Airborne Forces officer
  - Andrey Semenyuk, Member of Ryazan City Duma
- Dmitry Repnikov (LDPR):
  - Dmitry Borontov, Member of Ryazan Oblast Duma
  - Maksim Mustafin, Member of Ryazan Oblast Duma, acting coordinator of LDPR regional office
  - Yevgeny Myasin, Member of Ryazan City Duma
- Natalya Rubina (RPPSS):
  - Sergey Borisov, surgeon, chief doctor at Lavmed clinic
  - Anatoly Pavlukhin, professor of criminal law at Academy of Law Management of the Federal Penal Service of Russia
  - Pavel Voronin, entrepreneur
- Denis Sidorov (CPRF):
  - Dmitry Ivanichkin, Member of Ryazan City Duma, editor-in-chief of Priokskaya Pravda newspaper
  - Lilia Krivtsova, former Member of Ryazan City Duma (2013-2018)
  - Evelina Volkova, Member of Ryazan City Duma

== Polls ==
Fieldwork date	Polling firm	Malkov	Sidorov	Repnikov	Parsentyev	Rubina	Undecided	Lead
14 - 19 August 2022	Russian Field	47%	8%	7%	7%	5%	25%	39%

== Results ==
Summary of the 9–11 September 2022 Ryazan Oblast gubernatorial election results
Candidate	Party	Votes	%
Pavel Malkov (incumbent)	United Russia	320,976	84.55
Denis Sidorov	Communist Party	21,560	5.68
Dmitry Repnikov	Liberal Democratic Party	13,679	3.60
Natalya Rubina	Party of Pensioners	10,160	2.68
Grigory Parsentyev	A Just Russia — For Truth	8,395	2.21
Valid votes		374,770	98.73
Blank ballots		4,838	1.27
Total		379,609	100.00
Turnout		379,609	42.92
Registered voters		884,553	100.00

Former Governor Nikolay Lyubimov (United Russia) was appointed to the Federation Council, replacing incumbent Senator Irina Petina (Independent).

== See also ==
- 2022 Russian gubernatorial elections
