= Drobyshev =

Drobyshev (masculine, Russian: Дробышев) or Drobysheva (feminine, Russian: Дробышева) is a Russian surname. Notable people with the surname include:

- Artyom Drobyshev (born 1980), Russian soccer player
- Olga Drobysheva (born 1984), Uzbekistani cyclist
- Yury Drobyshev (1955–2024), Russian scientist

== See also ==
- Drobyshevsky
