= 2025 Ryazan Oblast legislative election =

Regional legislative election in Russia

- 12–14 September 2025

All 40 seats in the Oblast Duma 21 seats needed for a majority
- Turnout: 45.35% ▲12.87 pp
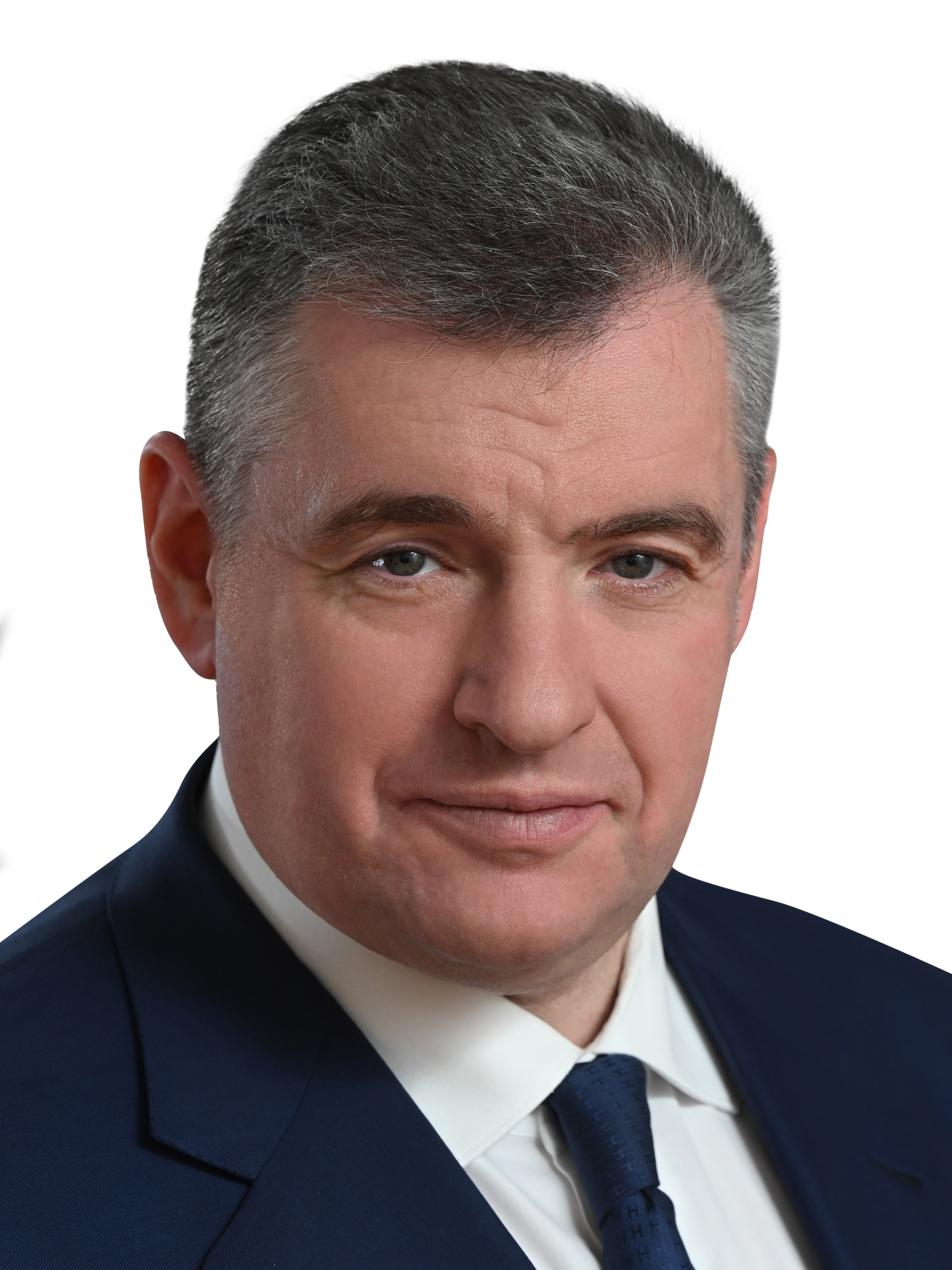
	Majority party	Minority party	Third party
			CPRF
Candidate	Pavel Malkov	Leonid Slutsky	Denis Sidorov
Party	United Russia	LDPR	CPRF
Last election	47.65%, 29 seats	11.99%, 3 seats	9.07%, 2 seats
Seats won	37	2	1
Seat change	▲8	▼1	▼1
Popular vote	287,129	31,354	25,168
Percentage	72.85%	7.96%	6.39%
Swing	▲25.20 pp	▼4.03 pp	▼2.68 pp
	Fourth party	Fifth party	Sixth party
	NL	RPPSS	SR–ZP
Candidate	Artyom Morozov	Natalya Rubina	Grigory Parsentyev
Party	New People	Party of Pensioners	SR–ZP
Last election	5.72%, 1 seat	5.35%, 1 seat	5.70%, 3 seats
Seats won	0	0	0
Seat change	▼1	▼1	▼3
Popular vote	16,317	12,544	9,979
Percentage	4.14%	3.18%	2.53%
Swing	▼1.58 pp	▼2.17 pp	▼3.17 pp
Chairman before election
Arkady Fomin
United Russia
Elected Chairman
Arkady Fomin
United Russia

The 2025 Ryazan Oblast Duma election took place on 12–14 September 2025, on common election day. All 40 seats in the Oblast Duma were up for re-election.

United Russia increased its already overwhelming majority in the Oblast Duma, winning 72.9% of the vote and all 20 single-mandate constituencies, increasing its vote share by 25 points. Liberal Democratic Party of Russia and Communist Party of the Russian Federation both lost one seat each, while New People, A Just Russia – For Truth and Party of Pensioners failed to cross the threshold and lost their entire factions.

== Electoral system ==
Under current election laws, the Oblast Duma is elected for a term of five years, with parallel voting. 20 seats are elected by party-list proportional representation with a 5% electoral threshold, with the other half elected in 20 single-member constituencies by first-past-the-post voting. Seats in the proportional part are allocated using the Imperiali quota, modified to ensure that every party list, which passes the threshold, receives at least one mandate.

== Candidates ==
=== Party lists ===
To register regional lists of candidates, parties need to collect 0.5% of signatures of all registered voters in Ryazan Oblast.

The following parties were relieved from the necessity to collect signatures:

- United Russia
- Communist Party of the Russian Federation
- Liberal Democratic Party of Russia
- A Just Russia — Patriots — For Truth
- New People
- Russian Party of Pensioners for Social Justice
- Communists of Russia

№	Party	Oblast-wide list	Candidates	Territorial groups	Status
1	United Russia	Pavel Malkov • Mikhail Davydov • Tatyana Panfilova	78	20	Registered
2	Communist Party	Denis Sidorov	72	20	Registered
3	Communists of Russia	Sergey Malinkovich • Ilya Kleymyonov • Marina Tyurina	80	20	Registered
4	The Greens	Yelena Biryukova • Aleksey Firstov • Vladimir Sidorov	50	16	Registered
5	New People	Artyom Morozov • Artur Zavyalov	77	20	Registered
6	A Just Russia – For Truth	Grigory Parsentyev • Aleksandr Averin	72	19	Registered
7	Liberal Democratic Party	Leonid Slutsky • Maksim Mustafin	62	20	Registered
8	Party of Pensioners	Natalya Rubina • Dmitry Borontov • Tatyana Starkova	60	20	Registered

Russian Ecological Party "The Greens" will take part in the Kaluga Oblast legislative election for the first time since 2015. Party of Direct Democracy, which participated in the last election, did not file, while For Truth and Party of Growth have been dissolved since.

=== Single-mandate constituencies ===

20 single-mandate constituencies were formed in Ryazan Oblast. To register candidates in single-mandate constituencies need to collect 3% of signatures of registered voters in the constituency.

Number of candidates in single-mandate constituencies
Party	Candidates	
Party	Nominated	Registered
United Russia	20	20
Liberal Democratic Party	20	20
Communist Party	18	16
New People	20	19
A Just Russia – For Truth	16	15
Party of Pensioners	17	17
Total	111	106

== Results ==
=== Results by party lists ===
Summary of the 12–14 September 2025 Ryazan Oblast Duma election results
Party	Party list					Constituency		Total	
Party	Votes	%	±pp	Seats	+/–	Seats	+/–	Seats	+/–
United Russia	287,129	72.85	▲25.20	17	▲6	20	▲2	37	▲8
Liberal Democratic Party	31,354	7.96	▼4.03	2	▼1	0	Steady	2	▼1
Communist Party	25,168	6.39	▼2.68	1	▼1	0	Steady	1	▼1
New People	16,317	4.14	▼1.58	0	▼1	0	Steady	0	▼1
Party of Pensioners	12,544	3.18	▼2.17	0	▼1	0	Steady	0	▼1
A Just Russia — For Truth	9,979	2.53	▼3.17	0	▼1	0	▼2	0	▼3
Communists of Russia	4,264	1.08	▼3.00	0	Steady	0	Steady	0	Steady
The Greens	2,804	0.71	New	0	New	–	–	0	New
Invalid ballots	4,555	1.16	▼1.18	—	—	—	—	—	—
Total	394,114	100.00	—	20	Steady	20	Steady	40	Steady
Turnout	394,114	45.35	▲12.87	—	—	—	—	—	—
Registered voters	869,042	100.00	—	—	—	—	—	—	—

Arkady Fomin (United Russia) was re-elected as Chairman of the Oblast Duma, while incumbent Senator Igor Murog (United Russia) was re-appointed to the Federation Council.

=== Results in single-member constituencies ===
==== District 1 ====
Summary of the 12–14 September 2025 Ryazan Oblast Duma election in District 1
Candidate	Party	Votes	%
Nikolay Ignatov (incumbent)	United Russia	21,296	80.91%
Sergey Vorobyev	New People	1,551	5.89%
Nikolay Zakharkin	Communist Party	1,444	5.49%
Sergey Tepovicharov	Liberal Democratic Party	1,015	3.86%
Galina Shlyakhina	Party of Pensioners	814	3.09%
Total		26,322	100%

==== District 2 ====
Summary of the 12–14 September 2025 Ryazan Oblast Duma election in District 2
Candidate	Party	Votes	%
Sergey Filippov	United Russia	20,393	72.39%
Svetlana Molodtsova	A Just Russia – For Truth	2,286	8.11%
Yelena Kostikina	Liberal Democratic Party	1,815	6.44%
Marina Zaplatkina	Party of Pensioners	1,799	6.39%
Artur Zavyalov	New People	1,417	5.03%
Total		28,172	100%

==== District 3 ====
Summary of the 12–14 September 2025 Ryazan Oblast Duma election in District 3
Candidate	Party	Votes	%
Vladimir Sidorov (incumbent)	United Russia	27,312	83.55%
Maksim Buryagin	New People	1,401	4.29%
Vera Temnova	Party of Pensioners	983	3.01%
Gennady Zinchenko	Communist Party	974	2.98%
Igor Morozov	A Just Russia – For Truth	901	2.76%
Sergey Barkov	Liberal Democratic Party	795	2.43%
Total		32,691	100%

==== District 4 ====
Summary of the 12–14 September 2025 Ryazan Oblast Duma election in District 4
Candidate	Party	Votes	%
Nikolay Plaskunov	United Russia	13,354	69.22%
Olga Gladkikh	Liberal Democratic Party	1,634	8.47%
Yury Sergeyev	A Just Russia – For Truth	1,626	8.43%
Tatyana Yegorova	Party of Pensioners	1,235	6.40%
Oleg Lunin	New People	982	5.09%
Total		19,291	100%

==== District 5 ====
Summary of the 12–14 September 2025 Ryazan Oblast Duma election in District 5
Candidate	Party	Votes	%
Aleksandr Kalashnikov	United Russia	13,362	66.19%
Aleksey Mochalov	Communist Party	2,059	10.20%
Aleksandr Matveyev	Liberal Democratic Party	1,620	8.02%
Pavel Borzikov	A Just Russia – For Truth	1,450	7.18%
Danil Danyukov	New People	1,181	5.85%
Total		20,188	100%

==== District 6 ====
Summary of the 12–14 September 2025 Ryazan Oblast Duma election in District 6
Candidate	Party	Votes	%
Aleksandr Glazunov (incumbent)	United Russia	20,238	80.42%
Roman Verein	Communist Party	1,887	7.50%
Ilona Parfenova	Liberal Democratic Party	1,055	4.19%
Tatyana Polyachkova	Party of Pensioners	652	2.59%
Andrey Zobnin	New People	605	2.40%
Ksenia Fetisova	A Just Russia – For Truth	455	1.81%
Total		25,165	100%

==== District 7 ====
Summary of the 12–14 September 2025 Ryazan Oblast Duma election in District 7
Candidate	Party	Votes	%
Arkady Fomin (incumbent)	United Russia	21,532	82.34%
Olga Burdasova	Party of Pensioners	1,700	6.50%
Yefim Goloskokov	Liberal Democratic Party	1,451	5.55%
Vasily Yefremov	Communist Party	1,157	4.42%
Total		26,151	100%

==== District 8 ====
Summary of the 12–14 September 2025 Ryazan Oblast Duma election in District 8
Candidate	Party	Votes	%
Vladimir Rozhkov (incumbent)	United Russia	22,466	81.42%
Sergey Lukonin	Communist Party	2,305	8.35%
Vladimir Ruzlev	Party of Pensioners	1,100	3.99%
Sergey Rybkin	A Just Russia – For Truth	618	2.24%
Nina Petrova	Liberal Democratic Party	518	1.88%
Vadim Polyevtov	New People	448	1.62%
Total		27,593	100%

==== District 9 ====
Summary of the 12–14 September 2025 Ryazan Oblast Duma election in District 9
Candidate	Party	Votes	%
Vladimir Materikin (incumbent)	United Russia	21,584	80.80%
Dmitry Vanyushkin	Communist Party	2,357	8.82%
Yelena Konovalenko	Liberal Democratic Party	1,481	5.54%
Valentina Yi	New People	954	3.57%
Total		26,713	100%

==== District 10 ====
Summary of the 12–14 September 2025 Ryazan Oblast Duma election in District 10
Candidate	Party	Votes	%
Sergey Lukyanov	United Russia	17,302	85.14%
Viktor Murugov	Liberal Democratic Party	1,824	8.98%
Dmitry Filimonov	New People	922	4.54%
Total		20,322	100%

==== District 11 ====
Summary of the 12–14 September 2025 Ryazan Oblast Duma election in District 11
Candidate	Party	Votes	%
Vladislav Frolov	United Russia	17,204	70.54%
Oksana Drik	Liberal Democratic Party	2,013	8.25%
Polina Kuksa	Party of Pensioners	1,686	6.91%
Andrey Tupikov	A Just Russia – For Truth	1,476	6.05%
Yevgeny Semionkin	New People	1,252	5.13%
Total		24,390	100%

==== District 12 ====
Summary of the 12–14 September 2025 Ryazan Oblast Duma election in District 12
Candidate	Party	Votes	%
Roman Igolkin (incumbent)	United Russia	7,982	67.23%
Viktor Roshchin	Communist Party	1,006	8.47%
Aleksandr Limin	Liberal Democratic Party	946	7.97%
Galina Belova	Party of Pensioners	936	7.88%
Aleksandr Smirnov	New People	781	6.58%
Total		11,872	100%

==== District 13 ====
Summary of the 12–14 September 2025 Ryazan Oblast Duma election in District 13
Candidate	Party	Votes	%
Dmitry Repnikov	United Russia	4,614	42.82%
Aleksandr Sherin	A Just Russia – For Truth	3,162	29.34%
Olga Korolenko	New People	864	8.02%
Aleksandr Okhrimenko	Communist Party	793	7.36%
Anna Lukyanenko	Liberal Democratic Party	571	5.30%
Dmitry Borontov	Party of Pensioners	523	4.85%
Total		10,776	100%

==== District 14 ====
Summary of the 12–14 September 2025 Ryazan Oblast Duma election in District 14
Candidate	Party	Votes	%
Aleksandr Zhukayev (incumbent)	United Russia	8,009	63.66%
Aleksandr Starikov	Liberal Democratic Party	1,337	10.63%
Denis Generalov	A Just Russia – For Truth	878	6.98%
Gennady Protsenko	Communist Party	823	6.54%
Evelina Sakayeva	New People	753	5.99%
Olesya Ogiyenko	Party of Pensioners	556	4.42%
Total		12,580	100%

==== District 15 ====
Summary of the 12–14 September 2025 Ryazan Oblast Duma election in District 15
Candidate	Party	Votes	%
Mikhail Agapkin (incumbent)	United Russia	6,992	62.30%
Sergey Zeritsky	Communist Party	1,222	10.89%
Roman Klimov	Liberal Democratic Party	967	8.62%
Dina Fatina	New People	733	6.53%
Nikolay Ruge	A Just Russia – For Truth	580	5.17%
Oksana Trifonova	Party of Pensioners	549	4.89%
Total		11,224	100%

==== District 16 ====
Summary of the 12–14 September 2025 Ryazan Oblast Duma election in District 16
Candidate	Party	Votes	%
Aleksandr Achalov (incumbent)	United Russia	6,871	60.05%
Anton Sokolov	Communist Party	1,124	9.82%
Pavel Vasilyev	Liberal Democratic Party	1,036	9.05%
Sergey Sharov	A Just Russia – For Truth	890	7.78%
Mikhail Filatov	New People	888	7.76%
Pavel Voronin	Party of Pensioners	445	3.89%
Total		11,443	100%

==== District 17 ====
Summary of the 12–14 September 2025 Ryazan Oblast Duma election in District 17
Candidate	Party	Votes	%
Andrey Glazunov (incumbent)	United Russia	6,182	56.80%
Yevgeny Bazhanov	Communist Party	1,567	14.40%
Aleksandr Kiryukhin	New People	899	8.26%
Nikolay Groshkin	Liberal Democratic Party	892	8.20%
Tatyana Starkova	Party of Pensioners	640	5.88%
Sergey Zelenkov	A Just Russia – For Truth	462	4.25%
Total		10,883	100%

==== District 18 ====
Summary of the 12–14 September 2025 Ryazan Oblast Duma election in District 18
Candidate	Party	Votes	%
Igor Trubitsyn (incumbent)	United Russia	10,426	74.74%
Aleksandr Yevdokimov	Communist Party	1,022	7.33%
Vladimir Zenin	New People	744	5.33%
Sergey Kasatin	Liberal Democratic Party	638	4.57%
Oksana Sukharnikova	Party of Pensioners	389	3.51%
Pavel Mikheyev	A Just Russia – For Truth	417	2.99%
Total		13,950	100%

==== District 19 ====
Summary of the 12–14 September 2025 Ryazan Oblast Duma election in District 19
Candidate	Party	Votes	%
Aleksandr Shevyrev (incumbent)	United Russia	12,818	78.07%
Aleksey Yegorov	Communist Party	836	5.70%
Yelena Yepikhina	Liberal Democratic Party	801	4.88%
Ivan Nikitchev	New People	691	4.21%
Yulia Yudina	Party of Pensioners	563	3.43%
Grigory Kalashnikov	A Just Russia – For Truth	459	2.80%
Total		16,418	100%

==== District 20 ====
Summary of the 12–14 September 2025 Ryazan Oblast Duma election in District 20
Candidate	Party	Votes	%
Sergey Pupkov (incumbent)	United Russia	6,403	63.33%
Vladimir Yakunin	Communist Party	967	9.56%
Andrey Ivanov	New People	854	8.45%
Ilya Trofimov	Liberal Democratic Party	711	7.03%
Nadezhda Levina	Party of Pensioners	663	6.56%
Daniil Sufranovich	A Just Russia – For Truth	334	3.30%
Total		10,110	100%

=== Members ===
Incumbent deputies are highlighted with bold, elected members who declined to take a seat are marked with ~~strikethrough~~.

Constituency
No.	Member	Party
1	Nikolay Ignatov	United Russia
2	Sergey Filippov	United Russia
3	Vladimir Sidorov	United Russia
4	Nikolay Plaskunov	United Russia
5	Aleksandr Kalashnikov	United Russia
6	Aleksandr Glazunov	United Russia
7	Arkady Fomin	United Russia
8	Vladimir Rozhkov	United Russia
9	Vladimir Materikin	United Russia
10	Sergey Lukyanov	United Russia
11	Vladislav Frolov	United Russia
12	Roman Igolkin	United Russia
13	Dmitry Repnikov	United Russia
14	Aleksandr Zhukayev	United Russia
15	Mikhail Agapkin	United Russia
16	Aleksandr Achalov	United Russia
17	Andrey Glazunov	United Russia
18	Igor Trubitsyn	United Russia
19	Aleksandr Shevyrev	United Russia
20	Sergey Pupkov	United Russia

Party lists
Member	Party
~~Pavel Malkov~~	United Russia
Mikhail Davydov	United Russia
~~Tatyana Panfilova~~	United Russia
Igor Murog	United Russia
Andrey Shalunov	United Russia
Yury Plugin	United Russia
Nikolay Makarikov	United Russia
Dmitry Knyazev	United Russia
Vladimir Podshivalkin	United Russia
Sergey Orlov	United Russia
Konstantin Sokolov	United Russia
Yulia Feoktistova	United Russia
Vyacheslav Morozov	United Russia
Georgy Svid	United Russia
Ivan Yudin	United Russia
Yelena Sinitsa	United Russia
~~Yekaterina Volkova~~	United Russia
Andrey Semenyuk	United Russia
Sergey Kukushkin	United Russia
Tatyana Barinova	United Russia
~~Leonid Slutsky~~	Liberal Democratic Party
~~Maksim Mustafin~~	Liberal Democratic Party
~~Sergey Barkov~~	Liberal Democratic Party
~~Lyudmila Korsakova~~	Liberal Democratic Party
~~Erik Urudzhev~~	Liberal Democratic Party
~~Aleksandr Matveyev~~	Liberal Democratic Party
~~Sergey Yerokhin~~	Liberal Democratic Party
~~Gennady Glazkov~~	Liberal Democratic Party
Aleksandr Starikov	Liberal Democratic Party
Pavel Vasilyev	Liberal Democratic Party
Denis Sidorov	Communist Party

== See also ==
- 2025 Russian regional elections
