= 2017 Ryazan Oblast gubernatorial election =

← 2012	10 September 2017	2022 →
- Turnout: 36.15%
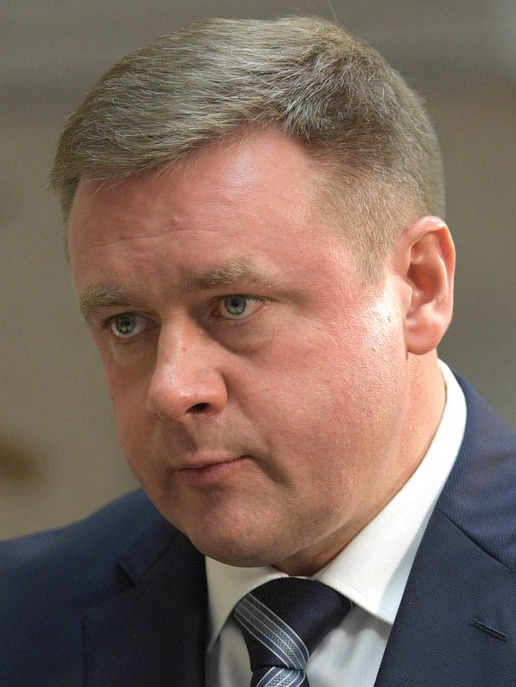

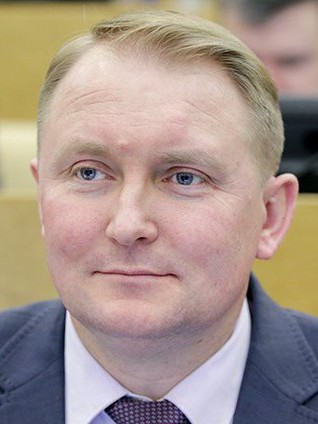

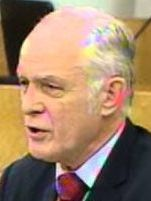
Nominee	Nikolay Lyubimov	Alexander Sherin	Vladimir Fedotkin
Party	United Russia	LDPR	CPRF
Popular vote	269,078	28,337	22,986
Percentage	80.16%	8.44%	6.85%
- 2017 Ryazan Oblast gubernatorial election results by municipality
Acting Governor before election
Nikolay Lyubimov
United Russia
Elected Governor
Nikolay Lyubimov
United Russia

Gubernatorial Election in Ryazan Oblast were held on 10 September 2017.

== Background ==
14 February 2017 the Governor Oleg Kovalyov announced early resignation and that he will not nominate his candidacy for a new term. Acting Governor was appointed Nikolay Lyubimov.

== Candidates ==
Candidates on the ballot:

Candidate	Party	Office
Nikolay Lyubimov; Born 1971 (age 45)	United Russia	Incumbent acting Governor
Alexandra Perekhvatova; Born 1954 (age 62)	Party of Growth	Chief of the main archival administration of Ryazan Oblast
Sergey Pupkov; Born 1970 (age 47)	A Just Russia	Member of Ryazan Oblast Duma
Vladimir Fedotkin; Born 1947 (age 70)	Communist Party	Former Member of the State Duma
Alexander Sherin; Born 1977 (age 40)	Liberal Democratic Party	Member of the State Duma

== Opinion polls ==
Date	Poll source	Lyubimov	Sherin	Fedotkin	Pupkov	Perekhvatova	Undecided	Abstention	Spoil the Ballot
10–21 August 2017	FOM	56%	4%	4%	1%	0%	21%	14%	0%
17–25 July 2017	FOM	53%	3%	3%	1%	<1%	26%	13%	1%

== Result ==
Candidate	Party	Votes	%
Nikolay Lyubimov	United Russia	269,078	80.16%
Alexander Sherin	Liberal Democratic Party	28,337	8.44%
Vladimir Fedotkin	Communist Party	22,986	6.85%
Sergey Pupkov	A Just Russia	5,780	1.72%
Alexandra Perekhvatova	Party of Growth	4,978	1.48%
Invalid ballots		4,511	1.34%
Total		335,670	100%

== See also ==
- 2017 Russian gubernatorial elections
