= Governor of Ryazan Oblast =

Highest-ranking official in Ryazan Oblast, Russia

- Standard of the Governor

- Incumbent; Pavel Malkov since 22 September 2022
- Seat: Ryazan
- Term length: 5 years
- Inaugural holder: Lev Bashmakov
- Formation: 1991
- Website: ryazan.gov.ru

The governor of Ryazan Oblast (Russian: Губернатор Рязанской области) is the highest official of Ryazan Oblast, a federal subject of Russia. The governor heads the executive branch in the region.

== History of office ==
The office of the Head of Administration of Ryazan Oblast was introduced on 25 September 1991 by the decree of the President of Russia Boris Yeltsin. Lev Poliyevktovich Bashmakov was appointed to the post, who already headed the region in 1988–90 as Chairman of the Executive Committee.

In December 1996, the first gubernatorial elections were held in the region. Member of the Communist Party Vyacheslav Lyubimov was the winner. The legislative election that followed a few months later also resulted in Communists' success, and Ryazan Oblast became a "red" region for the next 10 years.

In August 2002, amendments were made to the Charter of Ryazan Oblast: the post of "Head of Administration" was replaced by "Governor", who was also allowed to run for a third term. In 2012, the term of office was extended from four to five years.

== List of officeholders ==
No.	Portrait	Governor	Tenure	Time in office	Party	Election
1		Lev Bashmakov (1938–2018)	25 September 1991 – 25 January 1994 (removed)	2 years, 122 days	Independent	Appointed
2		Gennady Merkulov (1940–2015)	25 January 1994 – 15 October 1996 (resigned)	2 years, 264 days	Independent	Appointed
–		Igor Ivlev (born 1941)	15 October 1996 – 6 January 1997 (lost election)	83 days	Agrarian	Acting
3		Vyacheslav Lyubimov (born 1947)	6 January 1997 – 12 April 2004 (lost re-election)	7 years, 97 days	Communist	1996; 2000
4		Georgy Shpak (born 1943)	12 April 2004 – 12 April 2008 (was not renominated)	4 years, 0 days	Independent → United Russia	2004
5		Oleg Kovalyov (1948–2020)	12 April 2008 – 10 July 2012 (resigned)	8 years, 308 days	United Russia	2008 (Note: Appointed by the president of Russia with the consent of the Ryazan Oblast Duma.)
–		Oleg Kovalyov (1948–2020)	10 July 2012 – 19 October 2012	8 years, 308 days	United Russia	Acting
(5)		Oleg Kovalyov (1948–2020)	19 October 2012 – 14 February 2017 (resigned)	8 years, 308 days	United Russia	2012
–		Nikolay Lyubimov (born 1971)	14 February 2017 – 18 September 2017	5 years, 85 days	United Russia	Acting
6		Nikolay Lyubimov (born 1971)	18 September 2017 – 10 May 2022 (resigned)	5 years, 85 days	United Russia	2017
–		Pavel Malkov (born 1980)	10 May 2022 – 22 September 2022	4 years, 146 days	United Russia	Acting
7		Pavel Malkov (born 1980)	22 September 2022 – present	4 years, 146 days	United Russia	2022
