= Maxim Akimov =

Russian politician

- Максим Акимов
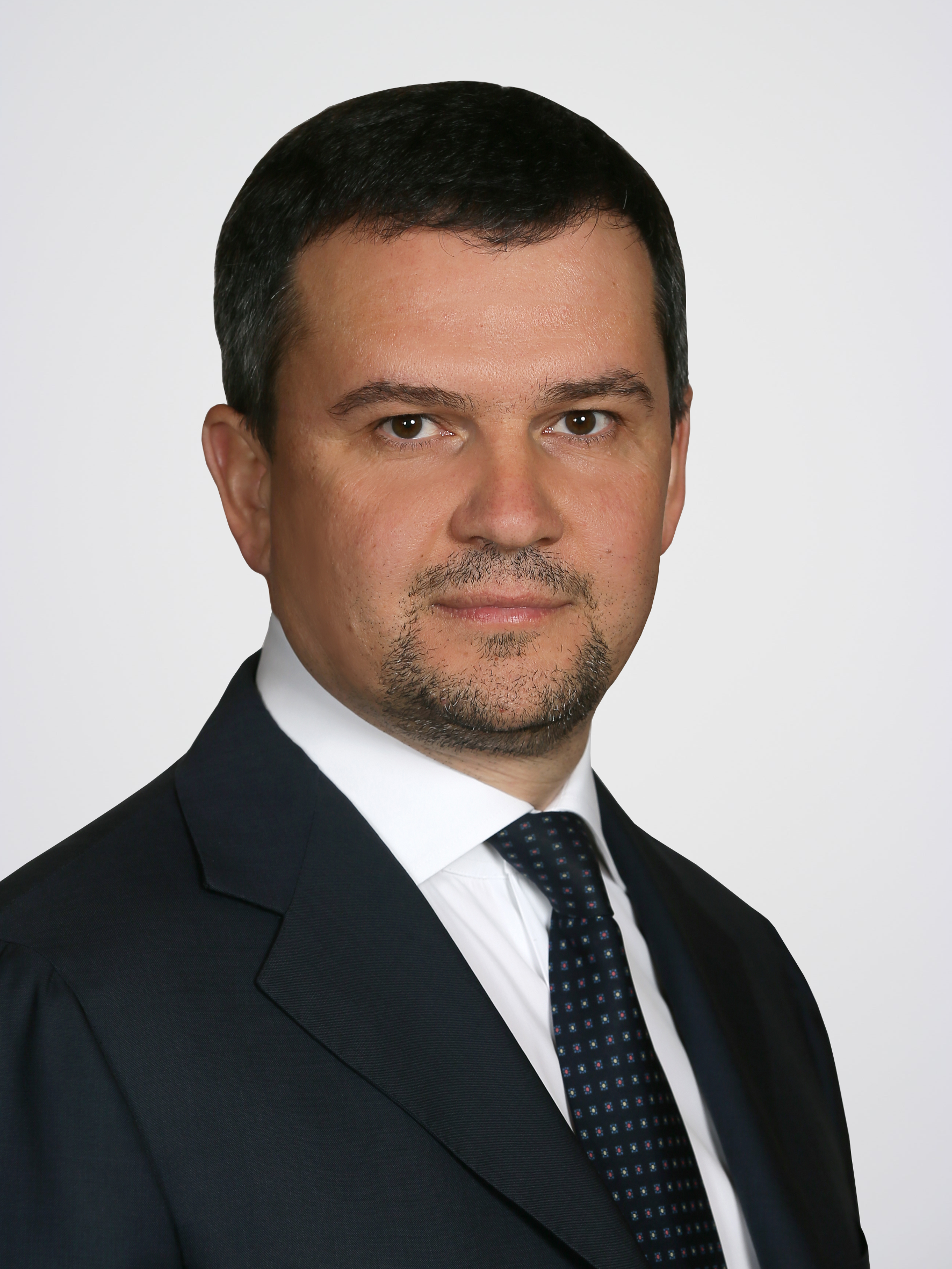
- Official portrait, 2018

CEO of the Russian Post
- Incumbent
- Assumed office 4 February 2020
- Preceded by: Nikolay Podguzov

Deputy Prime Minister for Transport, Communications and Digital Economy
- In office 18 May 2018 – 15 January 2020
- Prime Minister: Dmitry Medvedev

Vice Governor of Kaluga Oblast
- In office July 2007 – May 2012
- Governor: Anatoly Artamonov

Mayor of Kaluga
- In office 14 November 2004 – July 2007
- Preceded by: Valery Ivanov
- Succeeded by: Nikolay Lyubimov

Personal details
- Born: 1 March 1970 (age 56) Maloyaroslavets, Russian SFSR, Soviet Union (now Russia)
- Party: United Russia
- Children: 2
- Education: Kaluga State University

Maxim Alekseevich Akimov (Russian: Макси́м Алексе́евич Аки́мов; born 1 March 1970) is a Russian politician, CEO of the Russian Post since 2020. Previously he served as the Deputy Prime Minister of Russia from 2018–2020.

He has the federal state civilian service rank of 1st class Active State Councillor of the Russian Federation.

== Early life ==
Akimov was born in the city of Maloyaroslavets, in Kaluga Oblast.

In 1993 he graduated from Kaluga State University.

From 1994 to 1996, he was the CEO of the Faynart-Audit company, then headed the Commission for the Securities Market of the Kaluga Oblast. From 1998 to 2001, he served as the Deputy Director of the Department of Economy and Industry of Kaluga Oblast.

In 2004, he served as the Minister of Economic Development of Kaluga Oblast. In May 2004, he went to work for the municipal Government of Kaluga as the First Deputy Mayor. He later became acting Mayor. On 14 November 2004, he was elected as Mayor of Kaluga with 34.63% of the vote.

In July 2007, he was appointed Deputy Governor of Kaluga Oblast Anatoly Artamonov.

On 22 May 2012 he was appointed Deputy Chief of Staff of the Government of Russia. A year later, he took the place of First Deputy Chief of Staff.

On 7 May 2018, he was nominated for the post of Deputy Prime Minister for Transport, Communications and Digital Economy. On 15 January 2020, he resigned as part of the cabinet, after President Vladimir Putin delivered the Presidential Address to the Federal Assembly, in which he proposed several amendments to the constitution.

On 4 February 2020, the board of directors of the Russian Post appointed Akimov CEO of the organization for 5 years.

== Awards and titles ==
- Order of Alexander Nevsky (2014)
- Stolypin Medal, 2nd class (2017)
- Medal "For Special Services to the Kaluga Region" (2017)
- Commendation of the Government of the Russian Federation (2014)
- Honorary Citizen of the Kaluga Region (2019)

== Works ==
- Measuring the Great Divergence: Possibilities and Limitations of Quantification // Electronic Academic Journal History. 2017. Vol. 8, Issue 7(61).
- The California School of Economic History: A Revisionist Approach to the Phenomenon of the Great Divergence // Economic History. 2017. No. 2. pp. 43–60.
- The Great Divergence in Left-Wing Historical Discourse: The Second Phase of the Debate and the Thesis of R. Brenner // Economic History. 2019. Vol. 15. No. 1. pp. 9–22.
- The Phenomenon of the Great Divergence in Contemporary Foreign Historiography (Late 20th – Early 21st Century) — PhD thesis in History.

== Personal life ==
Maxim Akimov is married. He has two sons.
