= Petin (surname) =

Petin (Russian: Петин) is a Russian masculine surname, its feminine counterpart is Petina. Notable people with the surname include:

- Irina Petina (born 1972), Russian politician
- Irra Petina (1908-2000), Russian-born American actress and singer
- Yevgeniy Petin (born 1975), Uzbekistani triple jumper
