= Stanislav Drobyshevsky =

Russian anthropologist (born 1978)

- Станислав Дробышевский
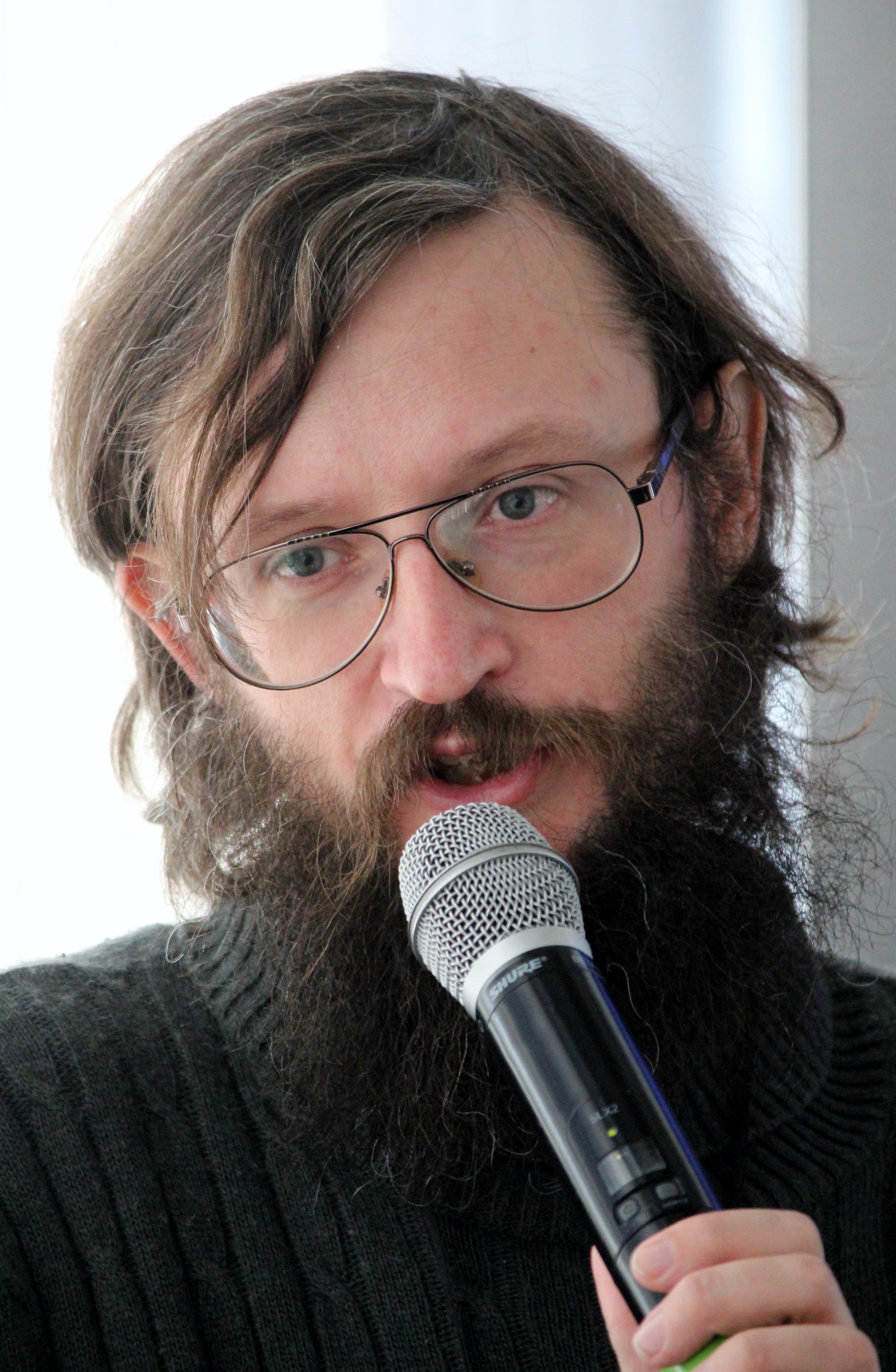
- Drobyshevsky in 2018
- Born: July 2, 1978 (age 48); Chita, Russian SFSR, Soviet Union
- Education: MSU Faculty of Biology, Moscow State University
- Awards: Prize For Loyalty to Science of the Ministry of Education and Science of the Russian Federation (2017), Silver Play Button
- Scientific career
- Fields: Human evolution, Biological anthropology, Race science,
- Workplaces: MSU Faculty of Biology, Moscow State University
- Website: Antropogenez.ru

Stanislav Vladimirovich Drobyshevsky (Russian: Станислав Владимирович Дробышевский; born 2 July 1978) is a Russian anthropologist and science popularizer. He is a Candidate of Sciences and works at the Anthropology department of the Faculty of Biology of Moscow State University. He is a scientific editor of the popular science portal Antropogenez.ru. His body of work includes monographs, university textbooks, and popular science books. He is a vlogger and YouTuber. He also frequently appears in other Russian popular science channels.

== Education ==
He studied at the MSU Faculty of Biology as an undergraduate in 1995-2000, and as a graduate student in 2000-2004. After getting a Candidate's degree in 2004, he has been working at the Anthropology Department of that faculty.

He created university courses in human evolution, anthropology, archaeology, and race science.

== Science communication ==
=== Non-missing link ===
In addition to his editorial activities, Drobyshevsky is actively working on his own project Non-missing Link. It is a series of articles where he discusses his views of the problems and methods of anthropology. The articles are illustrated by a series of short videos in which Drobyshevsky talks about the scientific method of studying human nature. For example, using copies of fossil skulls and skeletons, he discusses what specific parts of the skeleton are called, what the limits are of their variability within a species, which pathologies they can have, what functions they perform, which regions of the brain are responsible for them, how they are different or similar in humans and apes, and how they evolved.

In 2017, the series of articles was published as a two-volume book Non-missing link.

=== In media ===
Drobyshevsky frequently appears on radio and television. Since March 15, 2021, he has been hosting Homo Sapiens program on RTVI.

== Awards ==
Drobyshevsky was awarded a prize For loyalty to science by Russian Ministry of Education and Science as Popularizer of the year 2017.

== Bibliography ==
- Эволюция краниометрических признаков гоминид (канонический анализ). — М.—Чита: ЗИП СибУПК, 2000. — 140 с., илл.
- Черепные крышки из Сходни, Подкумка и Хвалынска — постнеандерталоидные формы Восточной Европы. — М.—Чита: ЗИП СибУПК, 2001. — 136 с., илл.
- Предшественники. Предки? Часть I «Австралопитеки», часть II «Ранние Homo». — М. — Чита: Издательство Читинского государственного технического института, 2002. — 174 с., илл. (Данная монография выдержала 3 издания).
- Предшественники. Предки? Часть III «Архантропы», часть IV «Гоминиды, переходные от архантропов к палеоантропам». — М: URSS, 2004, 344 с., илл. (Данная монография выдержала 3 издания).
- Предшественники. Предки? Часть V «Палеоантропы». — М.: КомКнига, 2006. — 264 с., илл. (Данная монография выдержала 3 издания).
- Эволюция мозга человека (анализ эндокраниометрических признаков гоминид). — М.: Издательство ЛКИ, 2007. — 176 с. (Данная монография выдержала 3 издания).
- Предшественники. Предки? Часть VI «Неоантропы верхнего палеолита (Африка, Ближний Восток, Азия)». — М.: Издательство ЛКИ, 2010. — 392 с., илл.
- Происхождение человеческих рас. Закономерности расообразования. Африка. — М.: URSS, 2014. — 404 с.
- Происхождение человеческих рас. Австралия и Океания. — М.: URSS, 2014. — 340 с.
- Антропогенез. М.: Модерн. 2017. ISBN 978-5-94193-074-6.
- Non-missing link. Vol 1. Apes and everyone else. М.: АСТ, Corpus. 2017. ISBN 978-5-17-101893-1.
- Non-missing link. Vol 2. Humans. М.: АСТ, Corpus. 2017. ISBN 978-5-17-101891-7.
- Байки из грота. 50 историй из жизни древних людей. М.: Альпина Нон-фикшн. 2018. ISBN 978-5-91671-918-5.
- Палеонтология антрополога. Подпишись на науку. Книги российских популяризаторов науки. М.: Эксмо. 2019. ISBN 978-5-04-102429-1.
