= WSBS =

WSBS can refer to:

- WSBS (AM), an AM radio station located in Great Barrington, Massachusetts
- WSBS-TV, a television station located in Florida
- Wellington Street bus station
- Watson School of Biological Sciences, renamed Cold Spring Harbor Laboratory School of Biological Sciences in 2020, a graduate school at Cold Spring Harbor Laboratory
- White Sea Biological Station
