= Antropogenez.ru =

Russian-language website

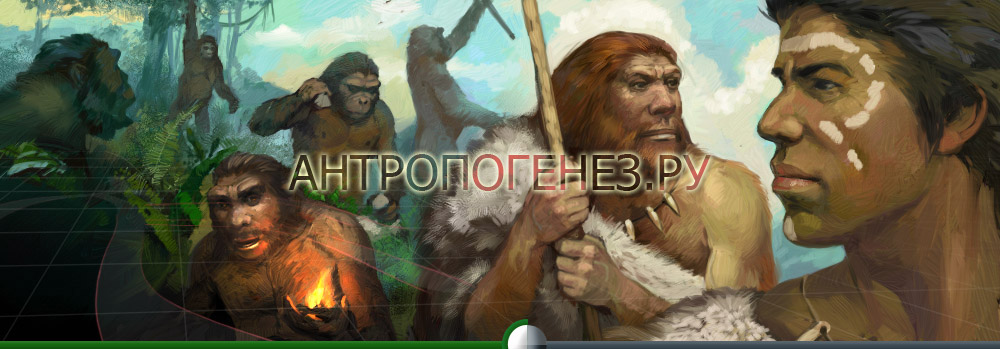
- Website type: popular science
- Available in: Russian
- Owner: Alexander Sokolov
- Creators: Alexander Sokolov, Stanislav Drobyshevsky
- Website: http://antropogenez.ru/

Antropogenez.ru is a Russian popular science website about human evolution. It was launched in 2010 by Alexander Sokolov and Stanislav Drobyshevsky.

== History ==
=== Activities ===
Website authors are unpaid volunteers. Alexander Sokolov, managed to recruit almost all active Russian anthropologists The site publishes popular science articles about origins and evolution of humankind. This website, together with Elementy.ru, popularizes the results of latest research on origins of humans, human intellect, and language.

In March 2014, the website together with State Biological Museum, organized an exhibition 10 Skulls That Shook The World. It exhibited precise copies of the most notable paleoanthropological finds. A series of lectures by prominent Russian scientists was held on the opening of the exhibition.

=== Projects ===
The website implemented a number of projects on cataloging a processing scientific data. An interactive Map of Human Ancestors was made with Google Maps and includes the locations of discoveries of the most important hominid fossils. Other projects are Catalog of Fossils, an interactive diagram Hominid Brain Volume, and a series of short videos Non-Missing Link. The purposes of the website sections Scientist and Media and Criticism are the protection of scientists’ reputation and publishing the reviews of popular pseudoscientific books.

Since 2016, a popular science forum Scientists against Myths is organized twice a year in Moscow (in MISiS university) or St. Petersburg. Its purposes are popularization of science and debunking quackery. The same year, Antropogenez.ru and Evolution fund created a satiric prize Honorary Academician of Lying Academy of Pseudoscience, which is “awarded” during the forum. In 2021, the pseudo-medicine nominations were split into a separate prize called Academy of Preventive Chakra Surgery.

== Awards ==
- 2017 — prize For Loyalty to Science (first place in category Best Popular Science Project of the Year as one of the organizers of Scientists against Myths forum.
- 2021 — prize For Loyalty to Science (finalist in category Best Popular Science Project of the Year as one of the organizers of Scientists against Myths forum.
