= Drobyshevsky =

Drobyshevsky (masculine, Russian: Дробышевский) or Drobyshevskaya (feminine, Russian: Дробышевская) is a Russian surname. Notable people with the surname include:

- Edward Drobyshevski (1936–2012), Russian astro and plasma physicist
- Stanislav Drobyshevsky (born 1978), Russian anthropologist and science popularizer
