= Sergei Anopriyenko =

Russian politician (born 1970)

- Сергей Аноприенко
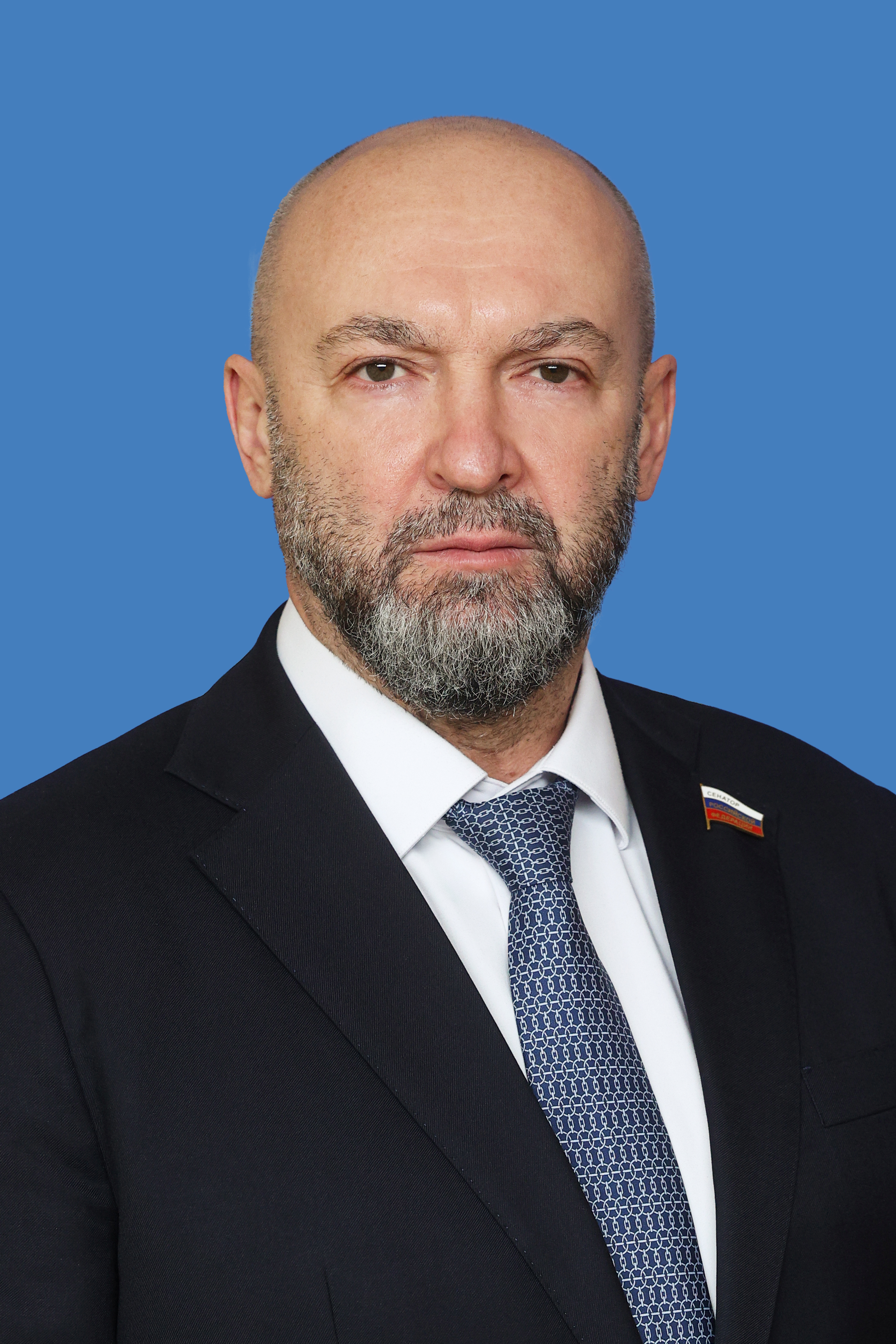

Senator from Ryazan Oblast
- Incumbent
- Assumed office 14 February 2025
- Preceded by: Nikolay Lyubimov

Personal details
- Born: 24 November 1970 (age 55) Novy Oskol, RSFSR, Soviet Union
- Party: Independent
- Education: Moscow Higher Combined Arms Command School; Russian Presidential Academy of National Economy and Public Administration

Sergei Mikhailovich Anopriyenko (Russian: Сергей Михайлович Аноприенко; born November 24, 1970) is a Senator of the Federation Council (since February 14, 2025) representing the executive branch of the Ryazan Oblast. He is also Deputy Chairman of the Federation Council Committee on Agrarian and Food Policy and Environmental Management.

== Biography ==
He was born on November 24, 1970, in Novy Oskol, Belgorod Oblast. In 1992, he graduated from the Moscow Higher Combined Arms Command School. In 2011, he graduated from the Russian Presidential Academy of National Economy and Public Administration. In 2016, he completed his postgraduate studies at the Institute of Management, Economics, and Innovation (Moscow). Until 2005, he worked in commercial structures. From 2005 to 2012, he served as Deputy Head and then Head of the Federal State Institution "Department of State Expertise and Housing Provision of the Ministry of Emergency Situations of Russia."

In 2012, he transferred to the Federal Agency for State Property Management (Rosimushchestvo), where he headed the Property Management Department of Federal Government Agencies and Organizations in the Sphere of Defense and Security. From 2017 to 2019, he served as Deputy Head of Rosimushchestvo. He was appointed to this post on October 20, 2017. He oversaw the Property Management Department of Federal Government Agencies and Organizations in the Sphere of Defense and Security, the Land Relations Department, and the Property Management Department of the State Treasury.

From September 30, 2019 to April 12, 2021, he served as Deputy Minister of Natural Resources and Environment of the Russian Federation and Head of the Federal Agency for Forestry (Roselkhoz). From April 12, 2021 to February 25, 2025, he served as Deputy Minister of Natural Resources and Environment of the Russian Federation. Since 2025 he is serving as Senator of the Federation Council of Russia, representative of the executive body of state power of the Ryazan Oblast. He was appointed to this position on February 14, 2025.

== Awards ==
- Medal of the Order "For Merit to the Fatherland", 2nd Class (2023)
- Certificate of Honor of the Government of Russia (2023)
- Medal of the Order "For Merit to the Astrakhan Oblast" (November 25, 2024) – for effective assistance in the socio-economic development of the Astrakhan Oblast in the field of conservation of natural resources and the environment.
- Actual State Counselor of the Russian Federation, 1st Class (2024)
