= Galina Klevezal =

Russian zoologist (1939–2021)

- Галина Клевезаль
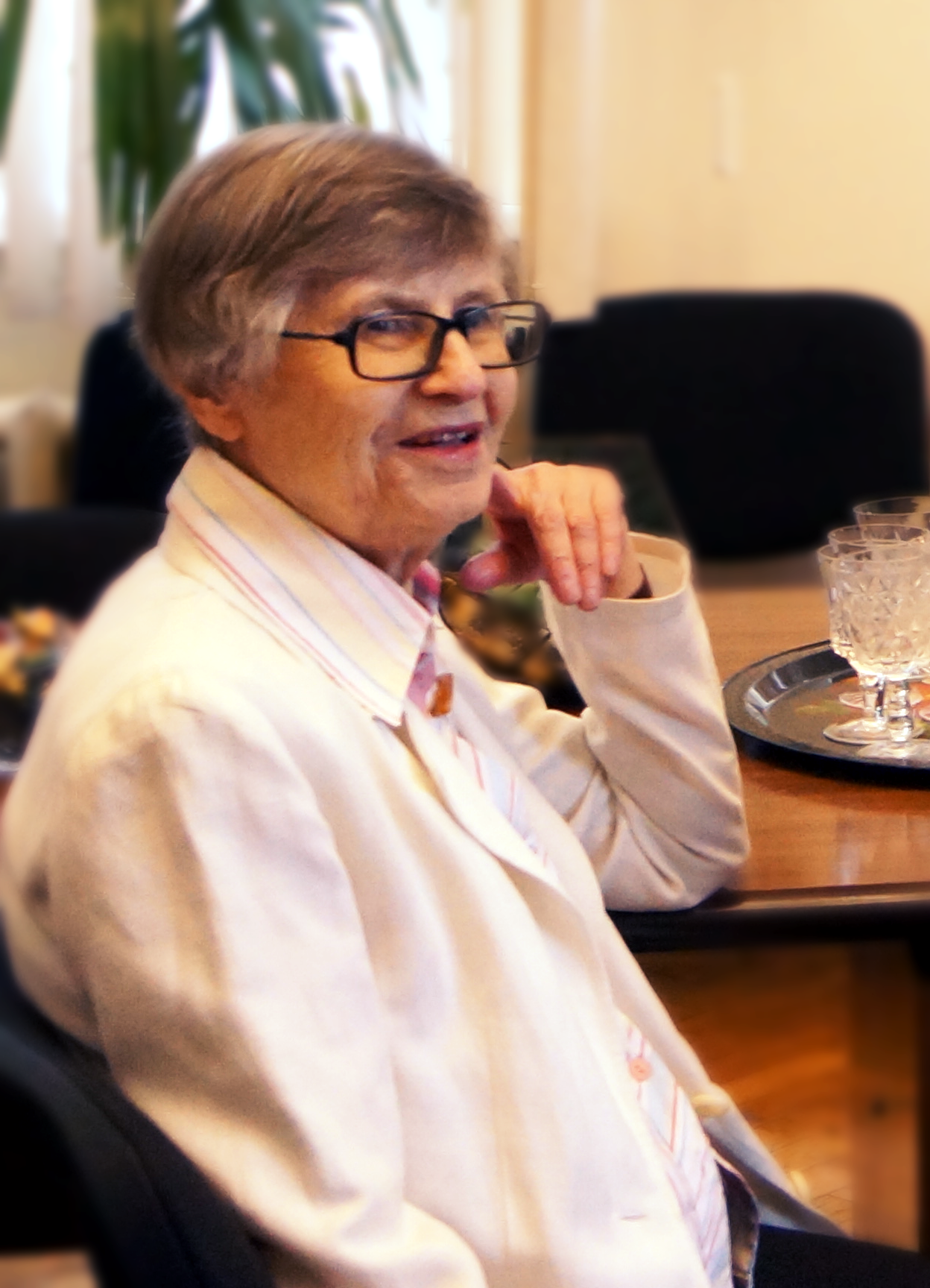
- Born: May 27, 1939; Moscow, Soviet Union
- Died: July 11, 2021 (aged 82); Moscow, Russia
- Education: Moscow State University
- Occupation: Zoologist
- Years active: 1956–2021
- Employer(s): N. K. Koltsov Institute of Developmental Biology, Russian Academy of Sciences
- Known for: Development of the field of skeletochronology
- Spouse: Mikhail Mina

Galina Aleksandrovna Klevezal (Russian: Галина Александровна Клевезаль; 27 May 1937 – 11 July 2021) was a Russian zoologist who specialised in the zoology and ontogeny of marine mammals. A researcher at the N. K. Koltsov Institute of Developmental Biology at the Russian Academy of Sciences, Klevezal was known for her pioneering work in the field of skeletochronology to determine the age of mammals.

== Biography ==
Klevezal was born in Moscow on 27 May 1937, the daughter of Aleksandr Petrovich Klevezal (Klevesahl; 1908–1940), an artist and engineer, and Ekaterina Fedorvna Klevezal (née Orlina; 1901–1984), a teacher from Ryazan. Klevezal's father died when she was an infant, and she and her sisters were raised by their mother.

After completing her education with a school medal in 1956, Klevezal started her studies at the Faculty of Biology at Moscow State University, where she specialised in vertebrate zoology. After deciding to focus on marine mammals, Klevezal completed an internship under Evgenia Karaseva, who recommended she join the laboratory of mammalogist Sergey Kleinenberg. In 1960, Klevezal started working at the A. N. Severtsov Institute of Animal Morphology. The following year, after graduating, Klevezal began working at the institute's Laboratory of Marine Mammal Biology under Kleinenberg. In 1968, the lab became part of the N. K. Koltsov Institute of Developmental Biology, part of the Russian Academy of Sciences.

During the 1950s, Klevezal met biologist Mikhail Mina at a meeting of the Young Biologists' Circle at the Moscow Zoo; they subsequently married.

Klevezal died on 11 July 2021.

== Research ==
As a researcher at the N. K. Koltsov Institute of Developmental Biology, Klevezal focused on an in-depth study of the ontogenesis, growth and development of animals based on the analysis of the structure of the layers formed in the tissues of their teeth and bones. In 1966, Klevezal successfully defended her thesis, in which she proposed a new method for determining the age of mammals by analysing layers of dentin and periosteum. In 1987, Klevezal defended her doctoral dissertation, entitled "Recording structures of mammals". She introduced the concept of recording structures into the study of determining the age of animals, publishing her research in the book Determination of the Age of Mammals from Layered Structures of Teeth and Bone (1967), which was later translated twice into English. In 1984, Klevezal organised a conference inviting zoologists from across the Soviet Union to develop a unified method of age determination methods.

Following the Chernobyl disaster in 1986, Klevezal developed a method to determine accumulated radiation dosages through analysing tooth enamel alongside physicists and physicians. While the wider focus of the method was to determine radiation doses in humans, Klevezal used the method to complete research on the impact of the disaster on reindeer and polar bears in Novaya Zemlya and Taymyr.

Klevezal was one of the founders of the Marine Mammal Council. In total, she authored over 160 articles, including several monographs, about determining the age and characteristics of growth and development of mammals based on teeth and bone structures. In the latter stages of her carer, Klevezal researched the incisors of rodents to determine the date animals emerged from hibernation, in order to judge the length of hibernation with greater accuracy.

== Selected publications ==
- Klevezal, G. A. and Kleinenberg, S. E. (1967). Opredeleniye vozpasta mlekopitayushchikh po sloistym strukturam zubov i kosti. Moscow: Nauka.
- Mina, M. V. and Klevezal, G. A. (1970). Avtobiografii zhivotnykh. Moscow: Znaniye.
- Mina, M. V. and Klevezal, G. A. (1976). Post zhivotnykh: Analiz na urovne organizma. Moscow: Nauka.
- Klevezal, G. A. (1996) Recording structures of mammals: Determination of age and reconstruction of life history. Rotterdam: A. A. Balkema.
- Klevezal, G. A. (2007) Printsipy i metody opredeleniya vozpasta mlekopitayushchikh. Moscow: Tovarishchestvo nauch. izd. KMK.
