= Ryazan State University =

- Рязанский государственный университет имени С. А. Есенина
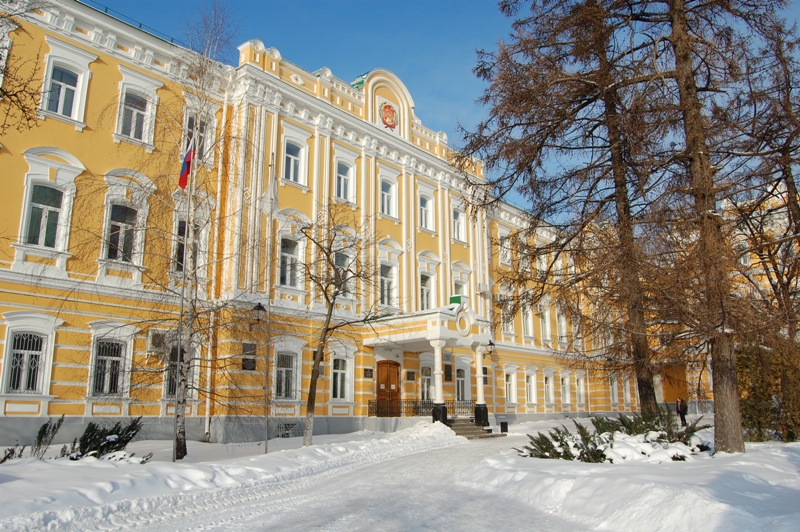
- Main campus of the university
- Type: Public
- Established: 1915; 111 years ago
- Rector: Oleg Andreevich Sulitsa
- Students: 8,000
- Location: 46 Svobody, Ryazan, Russia; 54.629456°N 39.752645°E
- Campus: Urban
- Nickname: RGU
- Website: rsu.edu.ru
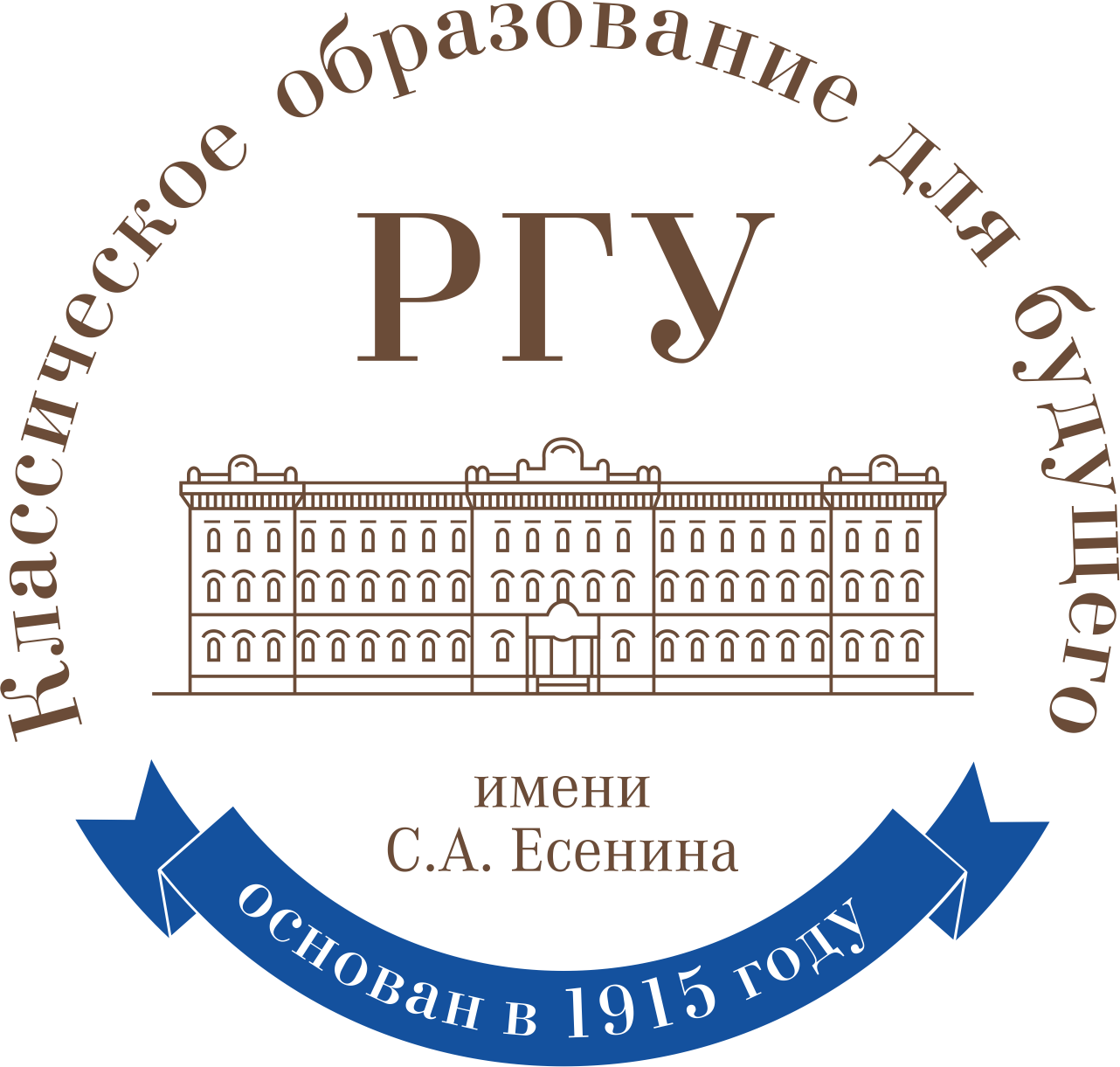

The Ryazan State University named for S. A. Yesenin (Russian: Рязанский государственный университет имени С. А. Есенина) is a university in Ryazan, Ryazan Oblast, Russia. It was founded in 1915. It bears the name of Russian poet Sergei Yesenin, who grew up in the region.

== History ==
RSU was founded in 1915, as a women's teacher training institute. In 1918, it was renamed as the Ryazan State Pedagogical Institute. In 1930 it was restructured and again renamed as the Ryazan State Pedagogical University. It began to expand its course offerings beyond teacher training in the 1980s; in 1992, it was one of the first pedagogical universities to be granted full university status. As of 1999, they enrolled roughly 5,500 students and employed 400 faculty and administrative staff.

The university began to use its present name in 2006.

== Rectors ==
- Igor Murog (November 30, 2022 - April 2, 2024) — acting rector
- Lazutkina Larisa Nikolaevna (April 2024 - August 27, 2024) — acting rector
- Bokov Dmitry Alexandrovich (from August 27, 2024) — acting rector
