= Skeletochronology =

Set of methodologies in skeletology

Skeletochronology is a technique used to determine the individual, chronological ages of vertebrates by counting lines of arrested, annual growth, also known as LAGs, within skeletal tissues. Within the annual bone growth specimens, there are broad and narrow lines. Broad lines represent the growth period and narrow lines represent a growth pause. These narrow lines are what characterises one growth year, therefore make it suitable to determine the age of the specimen. Not all bones grow at the same rate and the individual growth rate of a bone changes over a lifetime, therefore periodic growth marks can take irregular patterns. This indicates significant chronological events in an individual's life. The use of bone as a biomaterial is useful in investigating structure-property relationships. In addition to current research in skeletochronology, the ability of bone to adapt and change its structure to the external environment provides potential for further research in bone histomorphometry in the future. Amphibians and Reptiles are commonly aged determined, using this method, because they undergo discrete annual activity cycles such as winter dormancy or metamorphosis, however it cannot be used for all species of bony animals. The different environmental and biological factors that influence bone growth and development can become a barrier in determining age as a complete record may be rare.

== Method ==
The extraction and study of bone tissue varies depending on the taxa involved and the amount of material available. However, skeletochronology best focuses on LAGs that encircle the entire shaft in a ring form and have a regular pattern of deposition. These growths show a repeated pattern, 'described mathematically as a time series'. The tissues are divided using a microtome, stained with haematoxylin to be then viewed under a microscope. The analysis is frequently performed on dry bones with the additional application of alcohol or congelated preservation if needed, as the aim is to enhance the optical contrast which results from different physical properties to light.

It is important to consider potential problems when selecting particular bones to study. If there is a weak optical contrast, it makes counting the arrested growth rings difficult and often inaccurate. There is also a possible presence of additional growth marks that are created to supplement weaker areas of growth. In these circumstances, alternative bones must be considered that may present more accurate data. Another case is the doubling of lines of arrested growth where two closely adjacent twin lines can be seen. However, when the pattern is widespread for several age classes in that species, then the twin LAGs can be counted as a single year growth. The most common issue to arise is the destruction of bone from biological processes, most frequently discovered in mammals and Birds. This causes age to be significantly underestimated. Over the lifespan of an individual, bone is constantly being reconstructed as specialised cells remove and deposit bone leading to a constant renewal of the bone material. The continuous resorption and deposition leaves gaps in the record of growth and missing bone tissue is a case at any stage of a vertebrate's life cycle; 'complete specimens that allow precise identification are extremely rare'.

Therefore, to account for any missing bone tissues in a specimen, retrocalculation of skeletal age is to be completed.

Three approaches can be identified in retro calculating.

1) Retro calculating of skeletal age which involves identifying major and minor axe of the bone's cross section and circumferences of bones calculated using Ramanujan's formula

$C=\pi[3(a+b)-\surd(a+3b)(3a+b)]$.

2) Retro calculating through arithmetic estimate which requires the sampling of several parts of other bone and making an estimate of the number of missing tissues

3) Retro calculating by superimposition in an Ontogenic series which requires a complete growth record on one individual so that their histological cross sections can be overlaid and reconstructed on another individual.

Russian zoologist Galina Klevezal was a pioneering researcher in the field of skeletochronology, particularly in marine mammals.
