= Vladimir Shumny =

Russian geneticist (1934–2026)

- Владимир Шумный
- Born: Vladimir Konstantinovich Shumny; 12 February 1934; Khovmy, Borzna Raion, Chernihiv Oblast, Ukrainian SSR, Soviet Union
- Died: 20 March 2026 (aged 92); Novosibirsk, Russia
- Education: MSU Faculty of Biology
- Occupation: Geneticist

Vladimir Konstantinovich Shumny (Russian: Владимир Константинович Шумный; 12 February 1934 – 20 March 2026) was a Russian geneticist. A member of the Russian Academy of Sciences, the Academia Europaea, the National Academy of Sciences of Belarus and the National Academy of Sciences of Ukraine, he was a recipient of the Order of the Red Banner of Labour (1977).

Shumny died in Novosibirsk on 20 March 2026, at the age of 92.
