= Igor Murog =

Russian military and political figure (bon 1965)

- Игорь Мурог
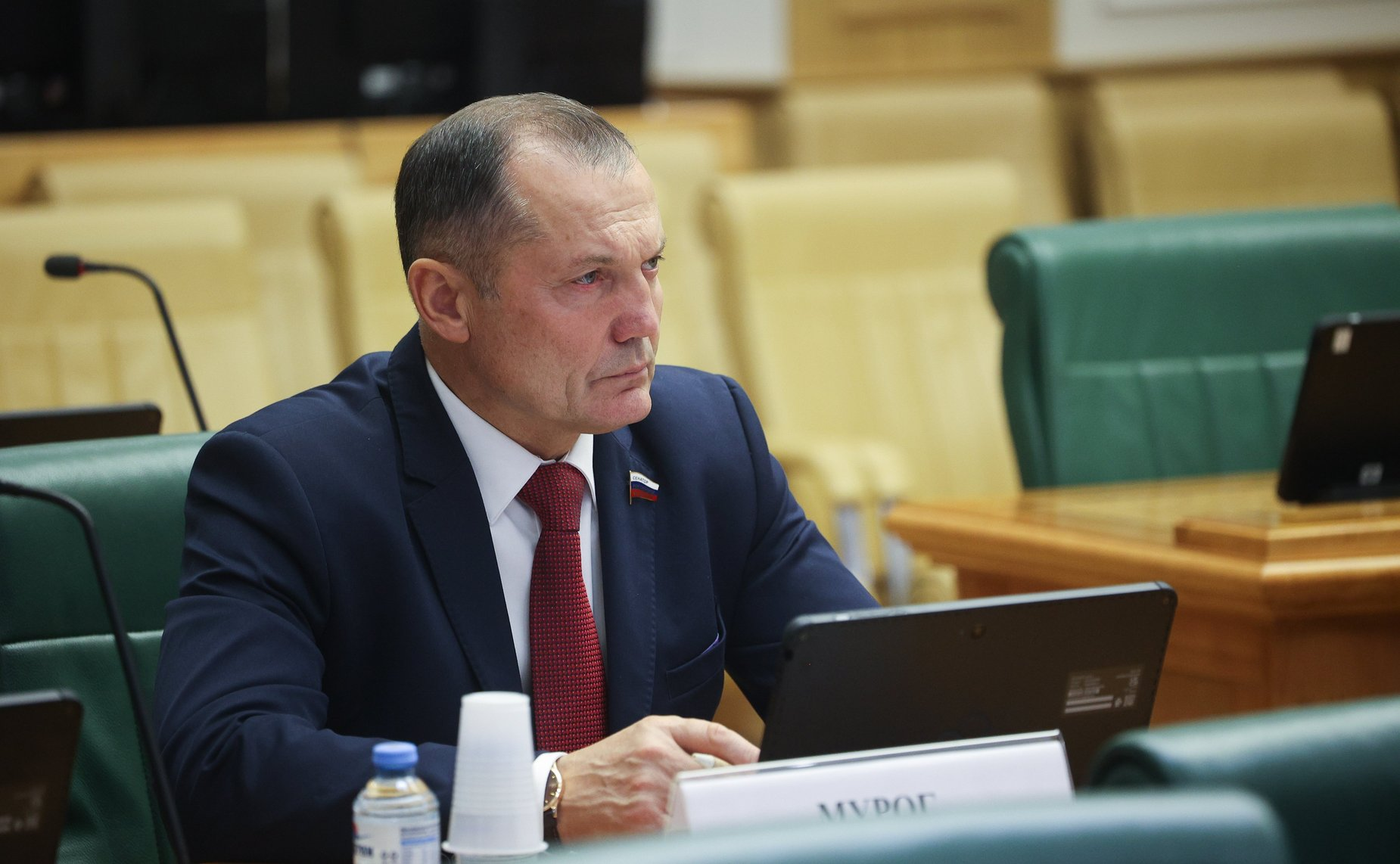

Senator from Ryazan Oblast
- Incumbent
- Assumed office 2 April 2024
- Preceded by: Igor Morozov

Personal details
- Born: 12 August 1965 (age 61) Ryazhsk, RSFSR, Soviet Union
- Party: United Russia
- Education: Ryazan Military Automobile Institute; Combined Arms Academy; Presidential Academy of National Economy and Public Administration

Military service
- Branch/service: Ground Forces
- Years of service: 1982-2012
- Rank: Polkovnik
- Commands: Novosibirsk Higher Military Command School; Chelyabinsk Higher Military Automobile Command and Engineering School

Igor Aleksandrovich Murog (Russian: Игорь Александрович Мурог; born August 12, 1965, in Ryazhsk, Ryazan Oblast) is a Russian military, government, and political figure. He is a Senator of the Federation Council (since 2024). He was appointed to the Federation Council Committee on Rules and Organization of Parliamentary Activity. On July 3, 2024, he was transferred to the Federation Council Committee on Science, Education, and Culture.

Acting Rector of the Yesenin Ryazan State University since November 30, 2022. He is a member of the Ryazan Oblast Duma of the 6th and 7th convocations, formerly Deputy Governor and Deputy Chairman of the Government of the Chelyabinsk Oblast; head of the Ryazan Institute of the Moscow State University of Mechanical Engineering (MAMI) since 2015.

== Biography ==
Born August 12, 1965, in Ryazhsk, Ryazan Oblast.

=== Teaching career ===
He graduated with honors from the Ryazan Higher Military Automobile Engineering School (Order of the Red Star) in 1987, specializing in "Automotive Engineering" (qualification as a mechanical engineer). A year later, he defended his dissertation for the degree of Candidate of Technical Sciences. He also graduated from the Combined Arms Academy of the Armed Forces of the Russian Federation (2004, specializing in "Management of the Operation of Weapons, Military Equipment, and Technical Support of Troops") and the Russian Presidential Academy of National Economy and Public Administration (bachelor's degree in "Public and Municipal Administration"). He holds the rank of colonel.

He served in the Soviet Armed Forces and the Russian Armed Forces from 1982 to 2012, holding positions ranging from cadet training platoon commander to head of the university in higher military educational institutions in a number of military districts. He was appointed deputy head of the Ussuri Automobile School; after its liquidation on December 1, 2007, he was appointed deputy head of the Chelyabinsk Higher Military Automobile School. He held the post of head of the Chelyabinsk Higher Military Automobile School from 2008 to 2010; in 2011, he headed the Novosibirsk Higher Military Command School. Doctor of Technical Sciences, Professor, member of the public Academy of Military Sciences and the International Academy of Sciences of Ecology and Life Safety (MANEB). Since 2015 — Director of the Ryazan Institute (branch) of the Moscow State University of Mechanical Engineering[2]. He is the author of two monographs and over 70 scientific and educational works. He is a Master of Sports in kettlebell lifting.

=== Politics ===
On April 16, 2012, he was appointed Deputy Governor of the Chelyabinsk Oblast: he was entrusted with overseeing the activities of the Ministry of Radiation and Environmental Safety, the Main Directorate for Interaction with Law Enforcement and Military Agencies, as well as the state committees for supporting the activities of justices of the peace and for mobilization work. In May 2013, he was appointed Deputy Prime Minister of the Chelyabinsk Oblast, and later served as an advisor to the rector's office of South Ural State University. On October 31, 2014, he resigned from his post as Deputy Prime Minister.

He was elected to the Ryazan Oblast Duma of the 6th convocation in 2015 from single-mandate constituency No. 11 as a member of the United Russia party. In September 2020, he was re-elected to the 7th Duma in single-mandate constituency No. 12 (nominated by the Ryazan regional branch of United Russia). He serves as Chairman of the Committee on Regulations, Mandate Issues, and Parliamentary Ethics and is a member of the Committee on Social Issues.

On April 2, 2024, deputies of the Ryazan Regional Duma appointed Murog as a senator, representing the region's legislative branch in the Federation Council (this position remained vacant following the resignation of Igor Morozov in 2022).

In 2019, he was elected President of the Ryazan Oblast Automobile and Motorcycle Sports Federation, replacing Dmitry Malakhov.

== Awards ==
- Order of Honour (2009)
- Jubilee Medal "70 Years of the Armed Forces of the USSR"
- Medal "For Distinction in Military Service"
- Honorary Worker of Higher Professional Education of the Russian Federation (2009)
- Certificate of Honor of the Governor of the Ryazan Oblast (2015)
- Commemorative sign of the Governor of the Ryazan Oblast "Gratitude from the Ryazan Land" (2020)
- Certificate of Honour of the Ryazan Oblast Duma (2020)
- VOIR Medal "For Merits in Invention and Rationalization" (2020)
- Other medals
