= MSU Faculty of Biology =

Faculty of Biology Lomonosov Moscow State University
- Биологический факультет МГУ имени М.В.Ломоносова
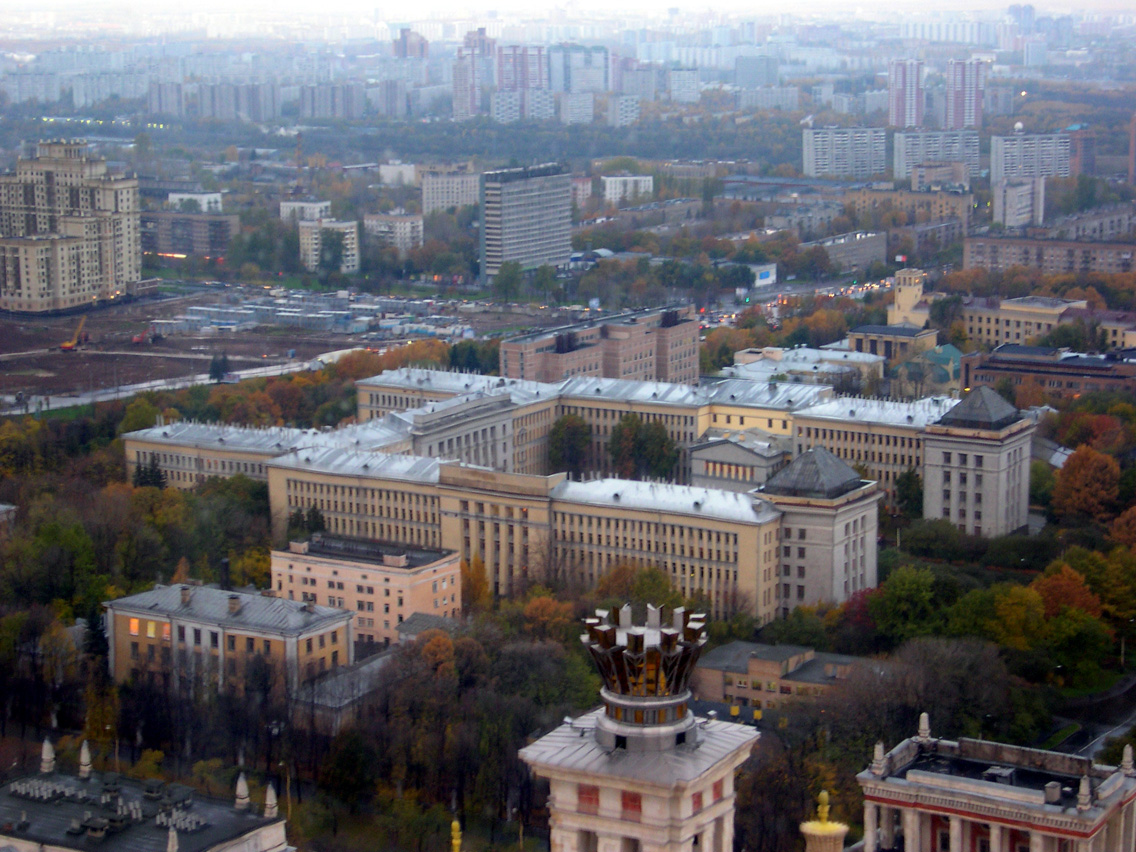
- Dean: Mikhail Kirpichnikov
- Location: Moscow, Russia
- Campus: Urban
- Website: www.bio.msu.ru

MSU Faculty of Biology (Russian: Биологический факультет МГУ) is a faculty of Moscow State University, created in 1930. There are about 1500 employees, including over 100 professors, 140 associate professors and teachers, 700 research associates. The Faculty Dean is - Mikhail Kirpichnikov, a member of the Russian Academy of Sciences.

== Departments ==
There are 26 departments and more than 50 scientific laboratories, 5 special laboratories, 2 biostations, zoological museum, herbarium and botanical garden with its branch:

- Department of Anthropology
- Department of Biochemistry
- Department of Bioengineering
- Department of Biological Evolution
- Department of Bioorganic Chemistry
- Department of Biophysics
- Department of Cell Biology and Histology
- Department of Embryology
- Department of Entomology
- Department of General Ecology and Hydrobiology
- Department of Genetics
- Department of Higher nervous activity
- Department of Highest plants
- Department of Human and animals Physiology
- Department of Hydrobiology
- Department of Ichthyology
- Department of Immunology
- Department of Microbiology
- Department of Molecular biology
- Department of Molecular Physiology
- Department of Mycology and Algology
- Department of Plant Ecology and Geography
- Department of Plant Physiology
- Department of Synthetic Biology
- Department of Virology
- Department of Invertebrate Zoology
- Department of Vertebrate Zoology

=== Biological stations and other branches ===
- Belomorsky biological station of N. A. Pertsov
- The Moscow State University Zvenigorod biological station of S. N. Skadovsky
- Zoological Museum of Moscow University
- Botanical garden
  - Aptekarsky ogorod - botanical gardens branch
- Herbarium

== Notable alumni ==
- Galina Klevezal, zoologist.
- Vladimir Shumny, geneticist
