= Nikolay Lyubimov =

Russian politician

- Николай Любимов
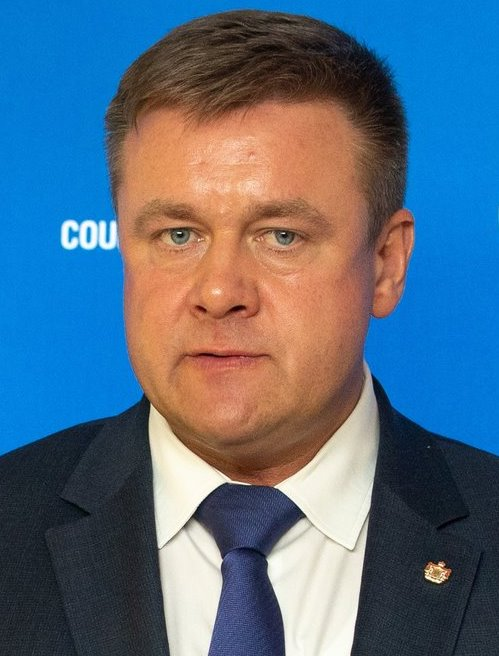
- Lyubimov in 2019

Russian Federation Senator from Ryazan Oblast
- In office 22 September 2022 – 11 December 2024
- Preceded by: Irina Petina
- Succeeded by: Sergei Anopriyenko

6th Governor of Ryazan Oblast
- In office 14 February 2017 – 10 May 2022
- Preceded by: Oleg Kovalyov
- Succeeded by: Pavel Malkov

Member of the State Duma
- In office 18 September 2016 – 17 February 2017

6th Mayor of Kaluga
- In office 2007 – 25 December 2010
- Preceded by: Maxim Akimov
- Succeeded by: Nikolay Polezhayev

Personal details
- Born: November 21, 1971 (age 54) Kaluga, RSFSR, USSR
- Party: United Russia

Nikolay Viktorovich Lyubimov (Russian: Николай Викторович Любимов; born 21 November 1971) is a Russian politician serving as a senator from Ryazan Oblast from September 2022. Previously, he was governor of Ryazan Oblast from 2020 to 2022, member of the 7th State Duma, deputy governor of Kaluga Oblast from 2011 to 2015, and mayor of Kaluga in from 2007 to 2010.

== Career ==
In 1993, he graduated from the Faculty of History of Kaluga State University (teacher of history and social and political disciplines). In 2001 he graduated from Moscow Humanitarian-Economic Institute (jurisprudence).

From 2004 to 2007, he was Minister of Economic Development of Kaluga Oblast.

From 2007 to 2010, he was Mayor of Kaluga.

From December 2010 to September 2015, he was Deputy Governor of Kaluga Oblast.

From September 2011 to September 2015, he was Deputy Governor of Kaluga Oblast — the head of the Administration of the Governor of Kaluga Oblast.

On September 13, 2015, at the election of deputies of the Legislative Assembly of Kaluga Oblast of the VI convocation, he was elected to the party list of United Russia.

On September 18, 2016, he was elected to the 7th State Duma of the Russian Federation.

On February 14, 2017, by decree of President Vladimir Putin, he was appointed acting governor of Ryazan Oblast. Before taking office, he was elected Governor of Ryazan Oblast.

On May 10, 2022, he announced his refusal to be re-elected to the post of governor in the next election.

== Personal life ==
Lyubimov is married and has two children.
