= Irina Petina =

Russian politician (born 1972)

- Ирина Петина
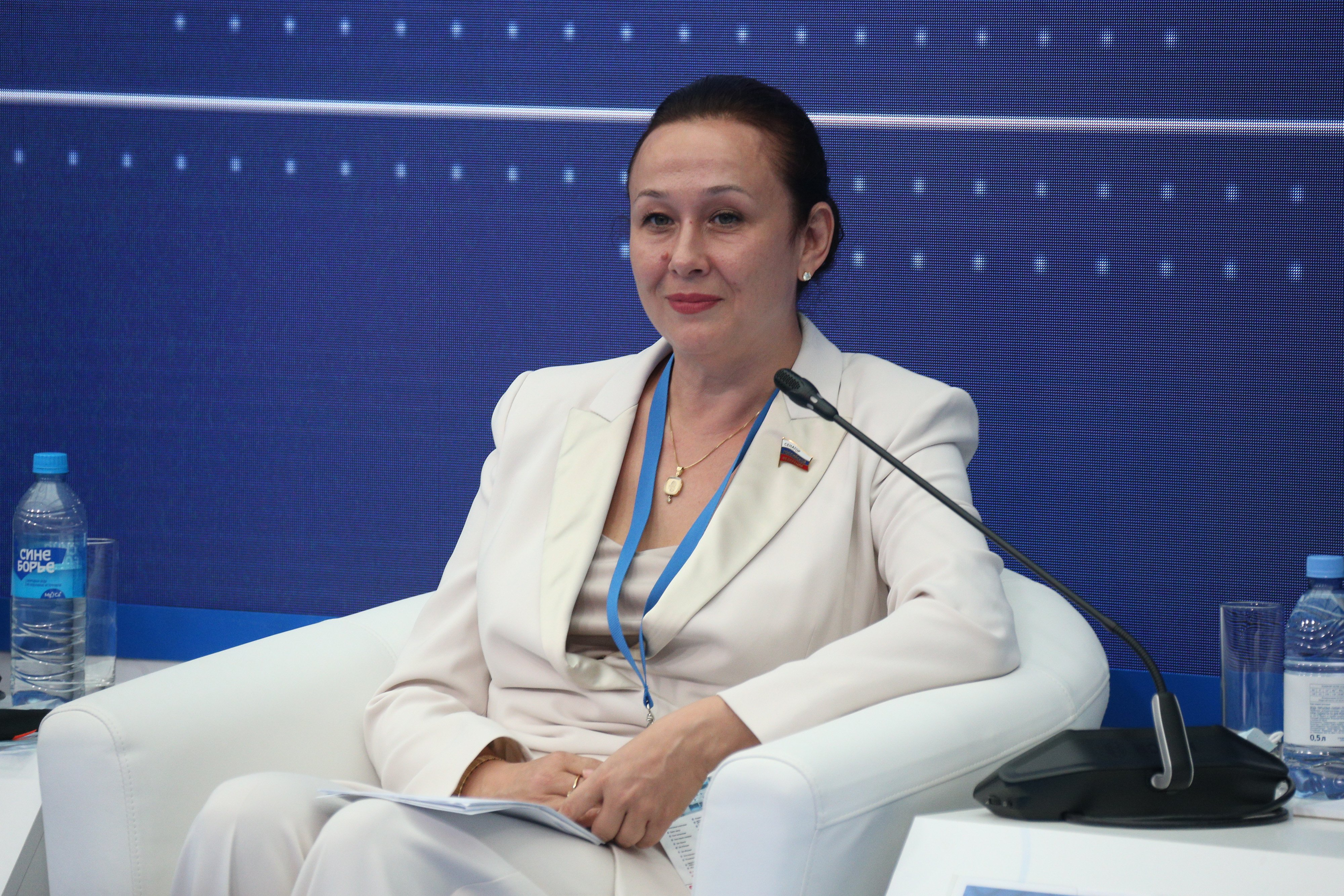
- Petina in September 2021

Senator from Ryazan Oblast
- In office 17 June 2020 – 21 September 2022
- Preceded by: Oleg Kovalyov
- Succeeded by: Nikolay Lyubimov

Personal details
- Born: Irina Petina; 31 August 1972 (age 54) Ryazan, Russian Soviet Federative Socialist Republic, Soviet Union
- Education: Ryazan State University

Irina Aleksandrovna Petina (Russian: Ирина Александровна Петина; born 31 August 1972) is a Russian politician who served as a senator from Ryazan Oblast from 2020 to 2022.

== Career ==
Irina Petina was born on 31 August 1972 in Ryazan. In 2003, she graduated from the Ryazan State University. Since 1994, she occupied different positions in the regional health department, later headed the department's legal service. From 2011 to 2020, she served as Deputy Minister of Health of the Ryazan Oblast. In 2020, Petina left this position to represent Ryazan Oblast in the Federation Council. Her term of office in the Federation Council expired in September 2022.

== Sanctions ==
Irina Petina is under personal sanctions introduced by the European Union, the United Kingdom, the United States, Canada, Switzerland, Australia, Ukraine, New Zealand, for ratifying the decisions of the "Treaty of Friendship, Cooperation and Mutual Assistance between the Russian Federation and the Donetsk People's Republic and between the Russian Federation and the Luhansk People's Republic" and providing political and economic support for Russia's annexation of Ukrainian territories.
