= Yury Drobyshev =

Russian scientist (1955–2024)

- Юрий Дробышев
- Drobyshev in 2006
- Born: Yury Aleksandrovich Drobyshev; 24 June 1955; Abakan, Khakass Autonomous Oblast, Russian SSR, USSR
- Died: 22 April 2024 (aged 68); Kaluga, Russia
- Education: Khakassian State University
- Scientific career
- Fields: Mathematics, pedagogy
- Workplaces: Kaluga State University; Financial University under the Government of the Russian Federation
- Doctoral advisor: Doctor of Education (2011)

Yury Aleksandrovich Drobyshev (Russian: Юрий Александрович Дробышев; 24 June 1955 – 22 April 2024) was a Soviet and Russian scientist, Doctor of Education, professor and rector of Kaluga State University from 2004 to 2010.

== Biography ==
Drobyshev was born on 24 June 1955, in Abakan into a family of employees. In 1972, after graduating from school, he entered the Khakassian State University, which he graduated in 1976 with a degree in mathematics.

After graduation, he was retained for teaching work and sent for a one-year internship at Leningrad State University. Starting in 1977, he worked as an assistant and senior lecturer at the Department of Higher Mathematics of the Abakan branch of the Krasnoyarsk State Technical University. In 1984, he went to work at the Abakan State Pedagogical Institute.

From 1986 to 1989, he studied in graduate school at the Department of Mathematical Analysis of the Moscow State Correspondence Pedagogical Institute. After graduating from graduate school, from 1990 to 2011, he worked at Kaluga State University and rose through various academic ranking grades.

Subsequently, Drobyshev earned the position of Professor of the Department of Higher Mathematics and Statistics of the Financial University under the Government of the Russian Federation.

Drobyshev wrote over 110 scientific and educational works, including school textbooks and teaching aids for universities, certified by the Ministry of Education and Science of the Russian Federation.

Drobyshev died on 22 April 2024, at the age of 68.
