= Kaluga State University =

Tsiolkovsky Kaluga State University
- Калужский государственный университет имени К. Э. Циолковского
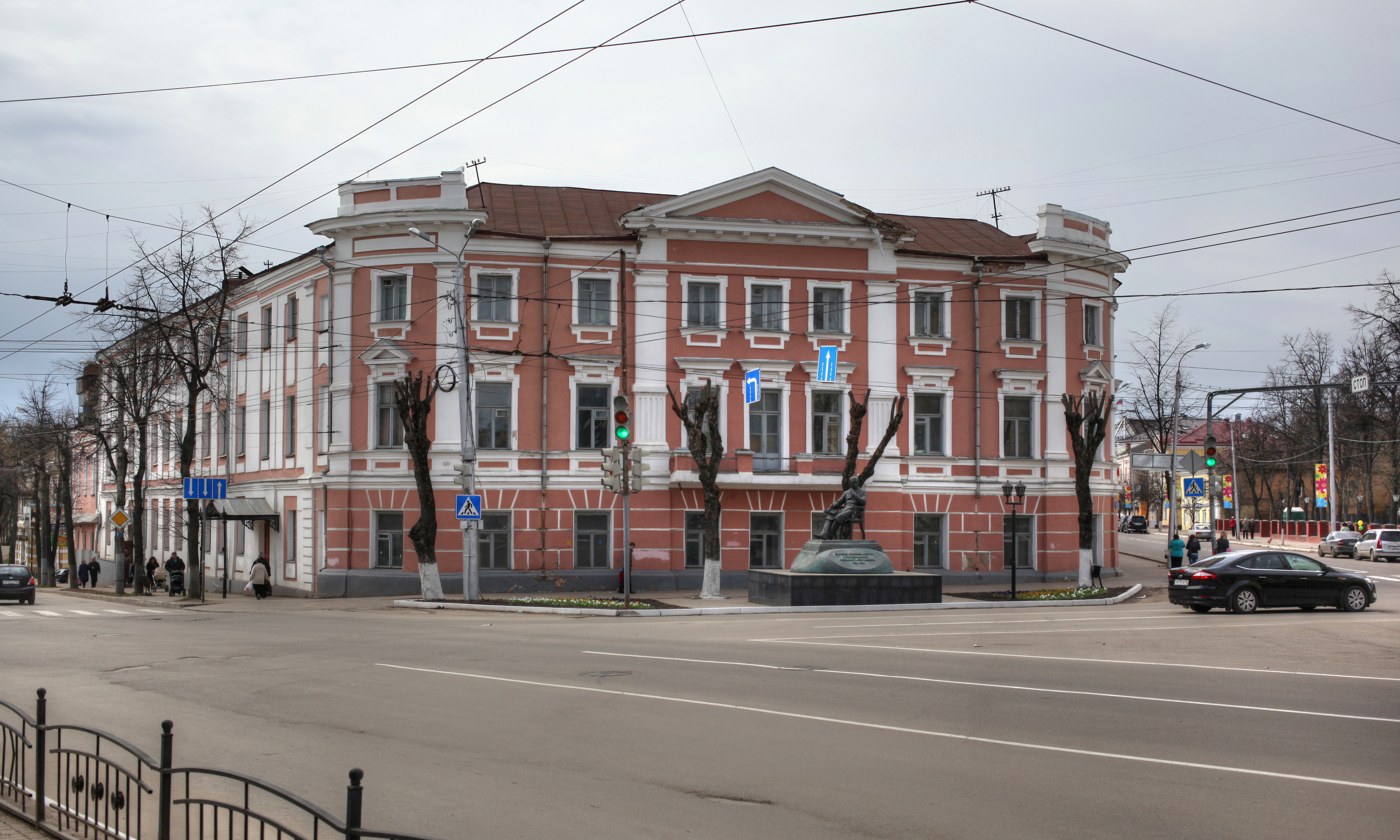
- The University building in the Lenin Street, Kaluga
- Former names: Kaluga State Pedagogical Institute, Tsiolkovsky Kaluga State Pedagogical University
- Type: Public
- Established: 1948
- Rector: Maksim Kazak
- Academic staff: 287
- Students: 4,500
- Postgraduates: 121
- Location: Kaluga, Russia; 54.5089°N 36.2739°E
- Campus: Urban
- Website: www.tksu.ru
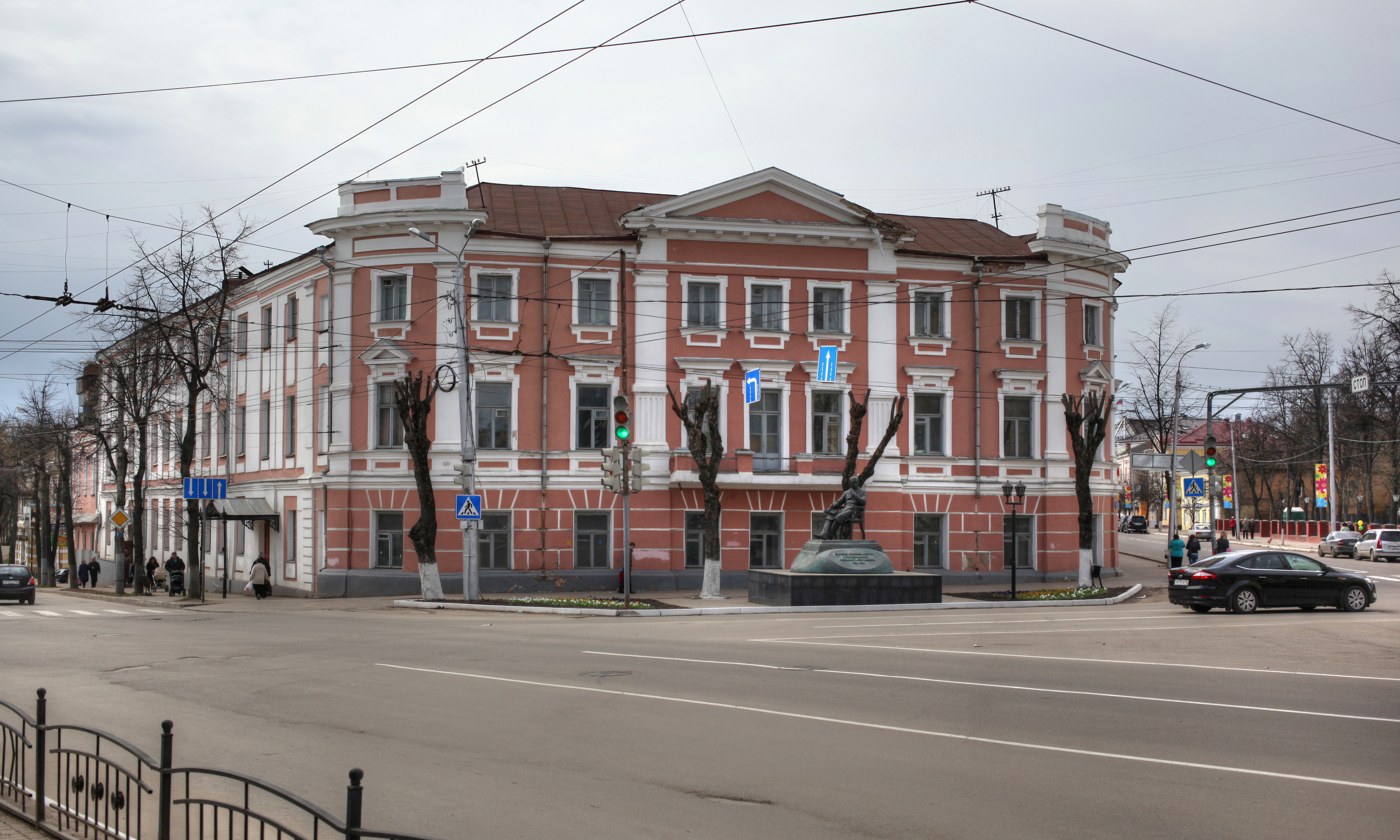

Kaluga State University (KSU, Russian: Калужский государственный университет), or, in full, Kaluga State University in the name of K. E. Tsiolkovsky (Russian: Калужский государственный университет имени К. Э. Циолковского), is a university in Kaluga, Russia.

The university was founded in 1948 as Kaluga State Pedagogical Institute. In 1963 it was named K. E. Tsiolkovsky Kaluga State Pedagogical Institute, in honour of rocket scientist Konstantin Tsiolkovsky. In 1994 it became K. E. Tsiolkovsky Kaluga State Pedagogical University, and in 2010 K. E. Tsiolkovsky Kaluga State University.

The university consists of nine institutes:

- Arts and Socio-Cultural Design;
- Engineering and Technologies;
- History and Law;
- Linguistics and World Languages;
- Medical;
- Natural Sciences;
- Pedagogics;
- Philology and Mass Media;
- Psychology;

Also The University has Institute for the Development of Professional Competencies.

There are three museums in the university: The Museum of KSU's history; The Museum-study of Alexander Chizhevsky; The Museum of the Natural Sciences' Institute.

The University publishes the scientific quarterly "The Kaluga University Bulletin" (Russian: Вестник Калужского университета), "The Kaluga University Bulletin. Series 1. Psychological sciences. Pedagogical Sciences" (Russian: Вестник Калужского университета. Серия 1. Психологические науки. Педагогические науки), "The Kaluga University Bulletin. Series 2. Studies in Philology" (Russian: Вестник Калужского университета. Серия 2. Исследования по филологии), "The Kaluga University Bulletin. Series 3. History. Politics. Law" (Russian: Вестник Калужского университета. Серия 3. История. Политика. Право.)

The rector of the university is Maksim Kazak, replaced Yury Drobyshev in this post.

== Names ==
- 1948-1963 — Kaluga State Pedagogical Institute
- 1963-1994 — Tsiolkovsky Kaluga State Pedagogical Institute
- 1994-2010 — Tsiolkovsky Kaluga State Pedagogical University
- Since 2010 — Tsiolkovsky Kaluga State University

== Gallery ==
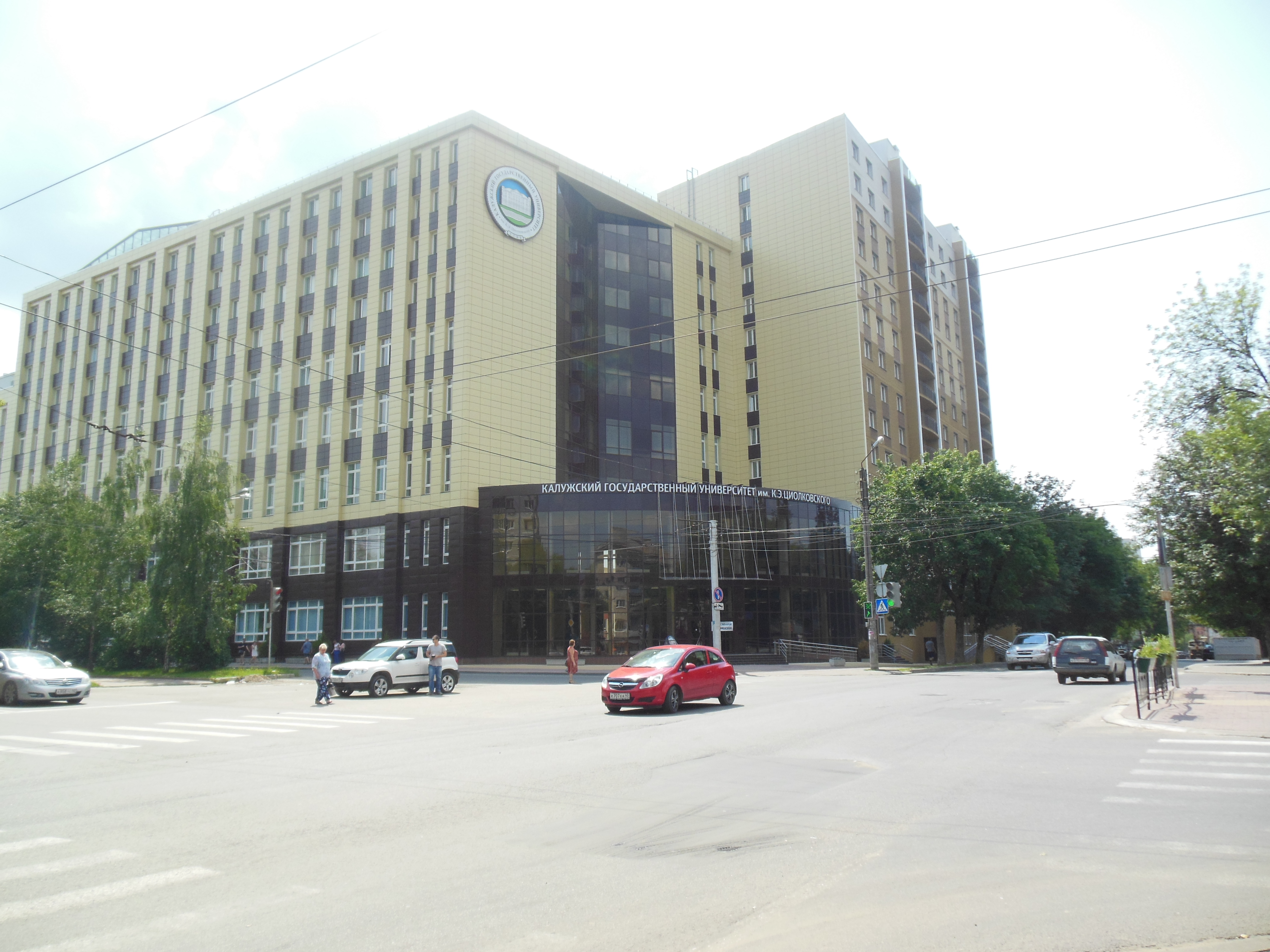
The University building on Stepan Razin street, 22/48

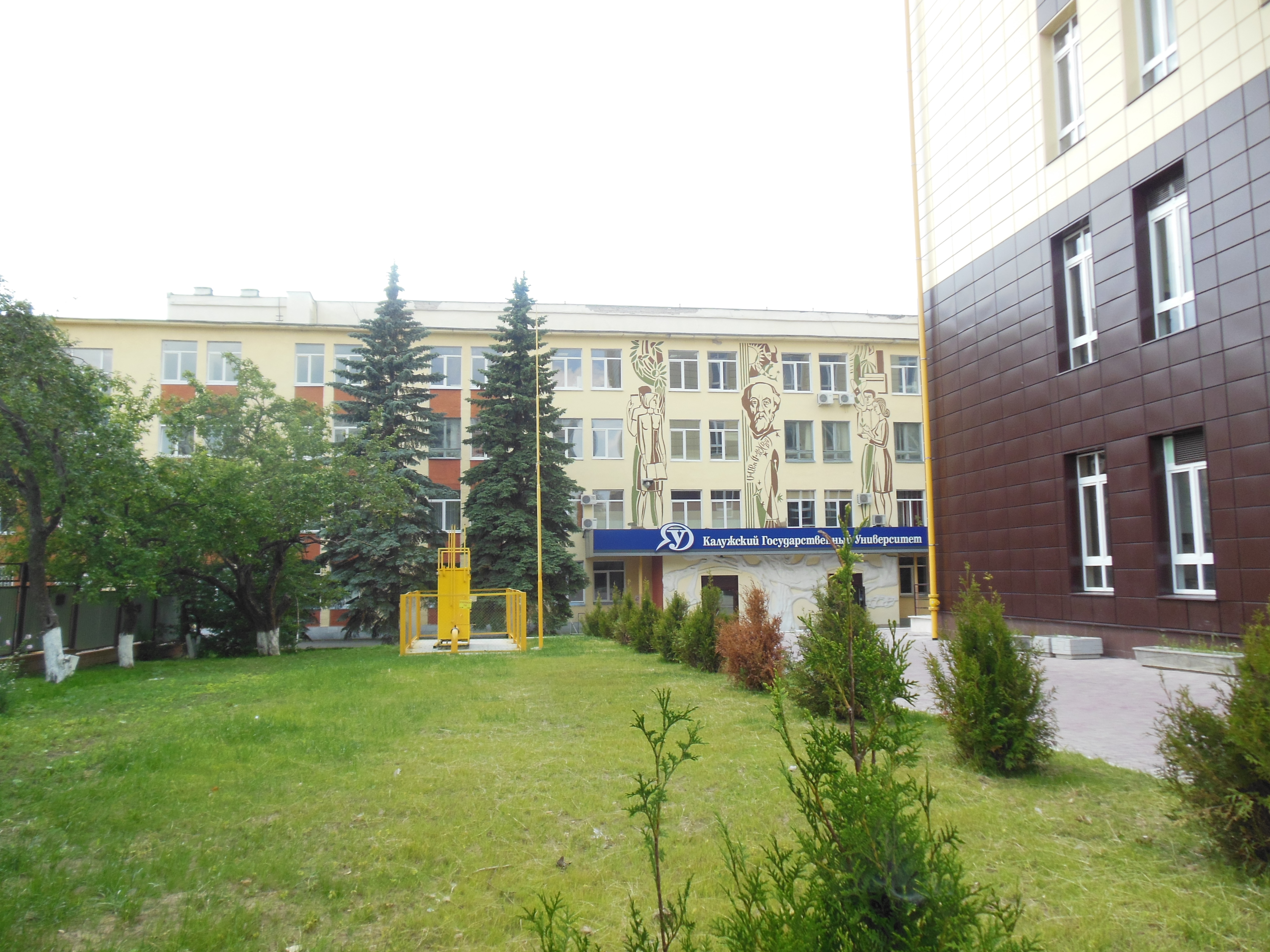
The University building on Stepan Razin street, 26

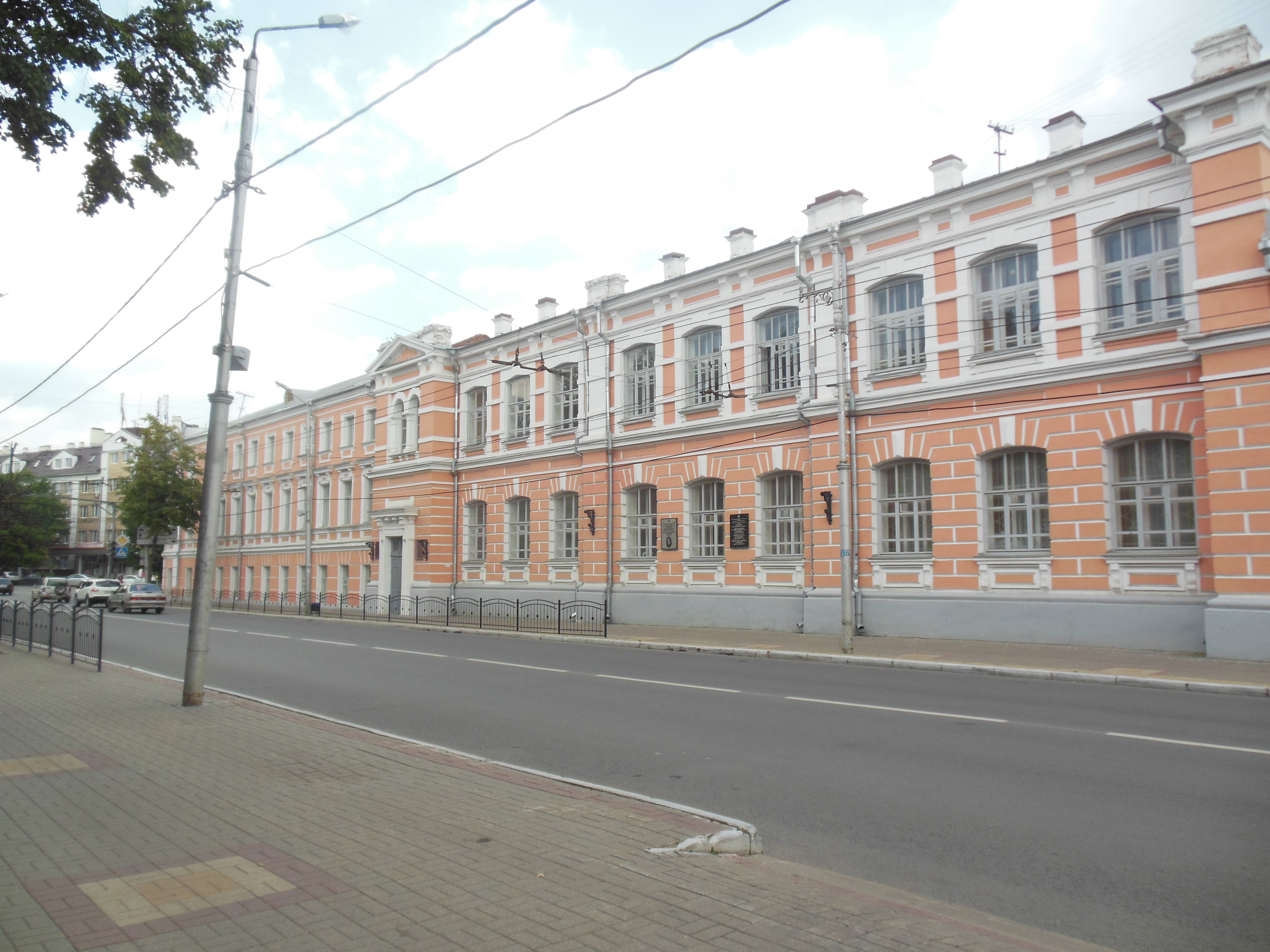
The University building on Lenin street, 83/2

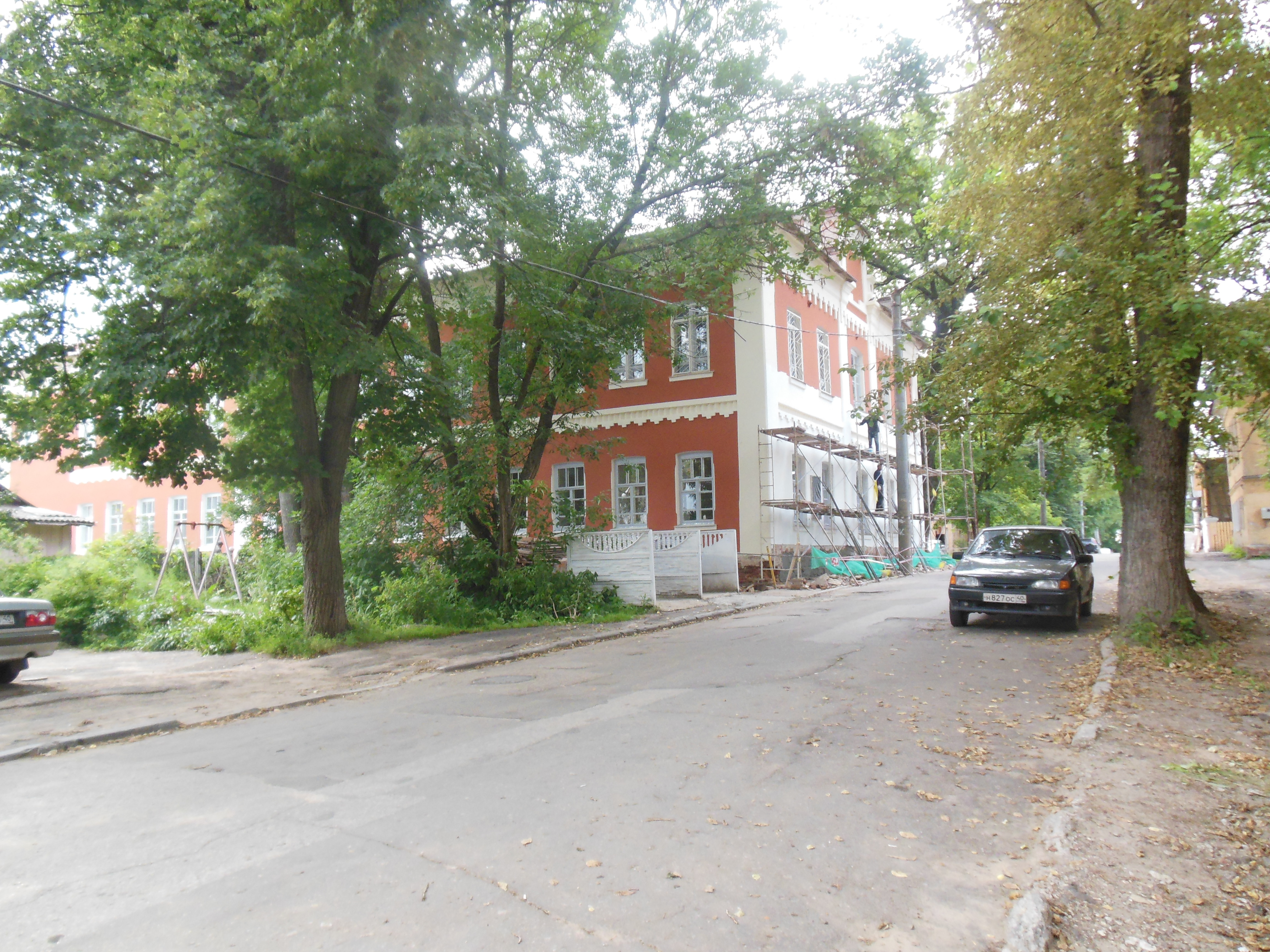
The University building on Voskresenskiy lane, 4
