= Pavel Malkov =

Russian politician (born 1980)

- Павел Малков
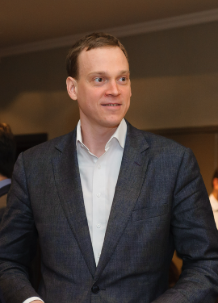
- Malkov in 2025

7th Governor of Ryazan Oblast
- Incumbent
- Assumed office 21 September 2022
- Preceded by: Nikolay Lyubimov

Governor of Ryazan Oblast (acting)
- In office 10 May 2022 – 21 September 2022

Head of the Federal State Statistics Service
- In office 14 December 2018 – 10 May 2022
- Preceded by: Aleksandr Surinov
- Succeeded by: Sergey Galkin

Personal details
- Born: Pavel Viktorovich Malkov; 29 January 1980 (age 46) Saratov, Russian SFSR, Soviet Union
- Education: Saratov State Technical University

Pavel Viktorovich Malkov (Russian: Павел Викторович Малков; born 29 January 1980) is a Russian politician who is currently serving as the 7th Governor of Ryazan Oblast since 21 September 2022. Before that he held the position of the Head of the Federal State Statistics Service.

He has the federal state civilian service rank of 1st class Active State Councillor of the Russian Federation.

== Biography ==
Pavel Malkov was born in Saratov on 29 January 1980.

In 2001, he graduated from Saratov State Technical University with a degree in Computer Science and Automated Systems Software.

Between 2003 and 2006, he worked in various positions in the Government of Saratov Oblast.

In 2004, he underwent professional retraining at the Volga Region Academy of Public Administration named after P. A. Stolypin with a degree in State and Municipal Administration.

From 2006 to 2009, he was the Deputy Minister of Economic Development and Trade of Saratov Oblast.

From 2008 to 2009, he studied at the Academy of National Economy under the Government of the Russia under the MBA program, specializing in Information Management.

From 2009 to 2010, he was the Deputy Director of the industrial enterprise EPO "Signal".

From 2010 to 2012, he was the Head of the Committee on Informatization of Saratov Oblast, while serving as Minister of the Government of Saratov Oblast.

In 2012, he served as Deputy Chairman of the Government of Saratov Oblast.

From 2012 to 2017, he was the Deputy Director of the Department of State Regulation in the Economy of the Ministry of Economic Development of Russia. From 2017 to 2018, he was promoted to the Director of the Department.

From 2018 to 2022, Malkov was the Head of the Federal State Statistics Service (Rosstat).

=== Acting Governor of Ryazan Oblast ===
On 10 May 2022, Malkov was appointed the acting Governor of Ryazan Oblast by the President of Russia. Elections are scheduled for 11 September 2022.

On 20 March 2026, Ryazan region Governor Pavel Malkov signed a decree ordering organisations, including private businesses, to set recruitment quotas for soldiers by 20 September 2026. Companies with 300 employees must nominate two "candidates" for military service in Ukraine, companies with 500 employees must nominate five "candidates".
