= Oleg Kovalyov (politician) =

Russian politician (1948–2020)

- Олег Ковалёв
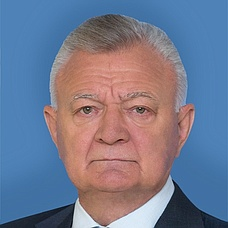

Senator from Ryazan Oblast
- In office 19 September 2017 – 11 May 2020
- Preceded by: Igor Morozov
- Succeeded by: Irina Petina

5th Governor of Ryazan Oblast
- In office 12 April 2008 – 14 February 2017
- Preceded by: Georgy Shpak
- Succeeded by: Nikolay Lyubimov

Member of the State Duma
- In office 18 January 2000 – 12 April 2008

Personal details
- Born: Oleg Ivanovich Kovalyov; Олег Иванович Ковалёв; 7 September 1948 village Vannovskoye, Tbilissky District, Krasnodar Krai, RSFSR, USSR
- Died: 11 May 2020 (aged 71)
- Party: United Russia
- Spouse: Olga Mishina
- Children: 3

Oleg Ivanovich Kovalyov (Russian: Оле́г Ива́нович Ковалёв; 7 September 1948 – 11 May 2020) was a Russian politician who served as governor of Ryazan Oblast (2008–2017).

He was a member of the State Duma of the Federal Assembly of the third, fourth and fifth convocations (1999–2008), Honored Builder of the Russian Federation (1997).

== Awards and honorary titles ==
- Order For Merit to the Fatherland 3rd class (2008)
- Order For Merit to the Fatherland 4th class (2005)
- Order of Honour (2013)
- Order of Friendship (2002)
- Medal In Commemoration of the 850th Anniversary of Moscow (1997)
