= Ryazan Oblast Duma =

Regional parliament of Ryazan Oblast, Russia

Ryazan Oblast Duma Рязанская областная дума
- 8th legislature
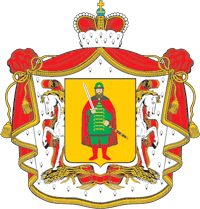

Type
- Type: Unicameral

Leadership
- Chairman: Arkady Fomin, United Russia since 7 April 2010

Structure
- Seats: 40
- Political groups: United Russia (37) LDPR (2); CPRF (1)

Elections
- Voting system: Mixed
- Last election: 12-14 September 2025
- Next election: 2030

Meeting place
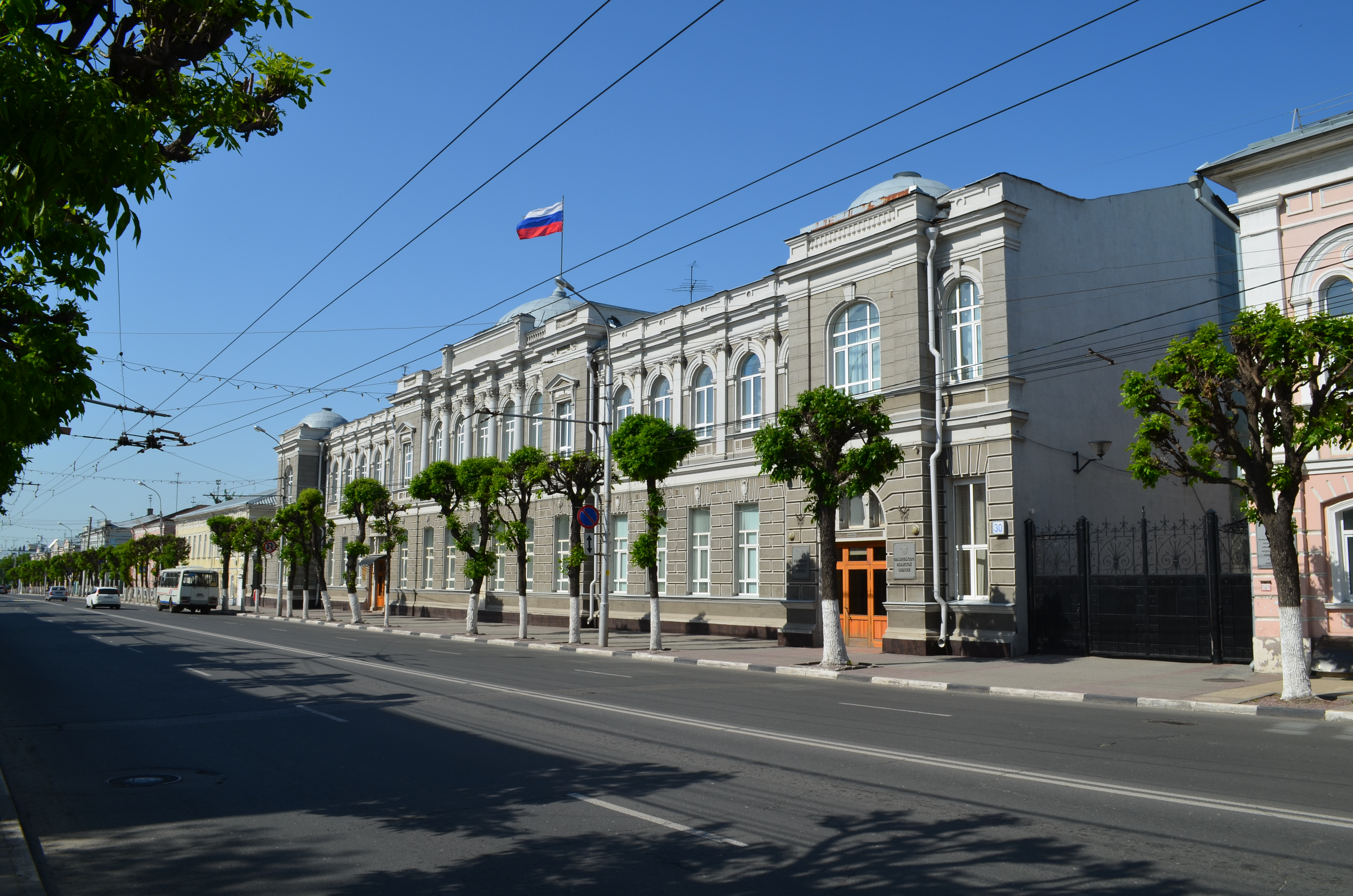
- 50 Pochtovaya Street, Ryazan

Website
- rznoblduma.ru

The Ryazan Oblast Duma (Russian: Рязанская областная дума, romanized: Ryazanskaya oblastnaya duma) is the regional parliament of Ryazan Oblast, a federal subject of Russia. A total of 40 deputies are elected for five-year terms.

== Elections ==
=== 2020 ===
Party	%	Seats
United Russia	47.65	29
Liberal Democratic Party of Russia	11.99	3
Communist Party of the Russian Federation	9.07	2
For Truth	6.92	1
New People	5.72	1
A Just Russia	5.7	3
Russian Party of Pensioners for Social Justice	5.35	1
Registered voters/turnout	32.49	

=== 2025 ===
Party	%	Seats
United Russia	72.85	37
Liberal Democratic Party of Russia	7.96	2
Communist Party of the Russian Federation	6.39	1
New People	4.14	0
Party of Pensioners	3.18	0
A Just Russia	2.53	0
Communists of Russia	1.08	0
The Greens	0.71	0
Invalid ballots	1.16	
Registered voters/turnout	45.35	
