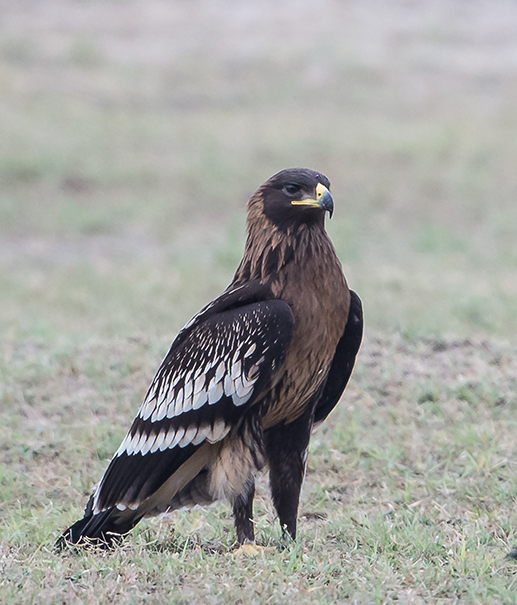
- Immature individual at Tal Chhapar Sanctuary, Rajasthan. The spots will be lost in adulthood.

Conservation status
- Vulnerable (IUCN 3.1)

Scientific classification
- Kingdom: Animalia
- Phylum: Chordata
- Class: Aves
- Order: Accipitriformes
- Family: Accipitridae
- Genus: Clanga
- Species: C. clanga

Binomial name
- Clanga clanga (Pallas, 1811)
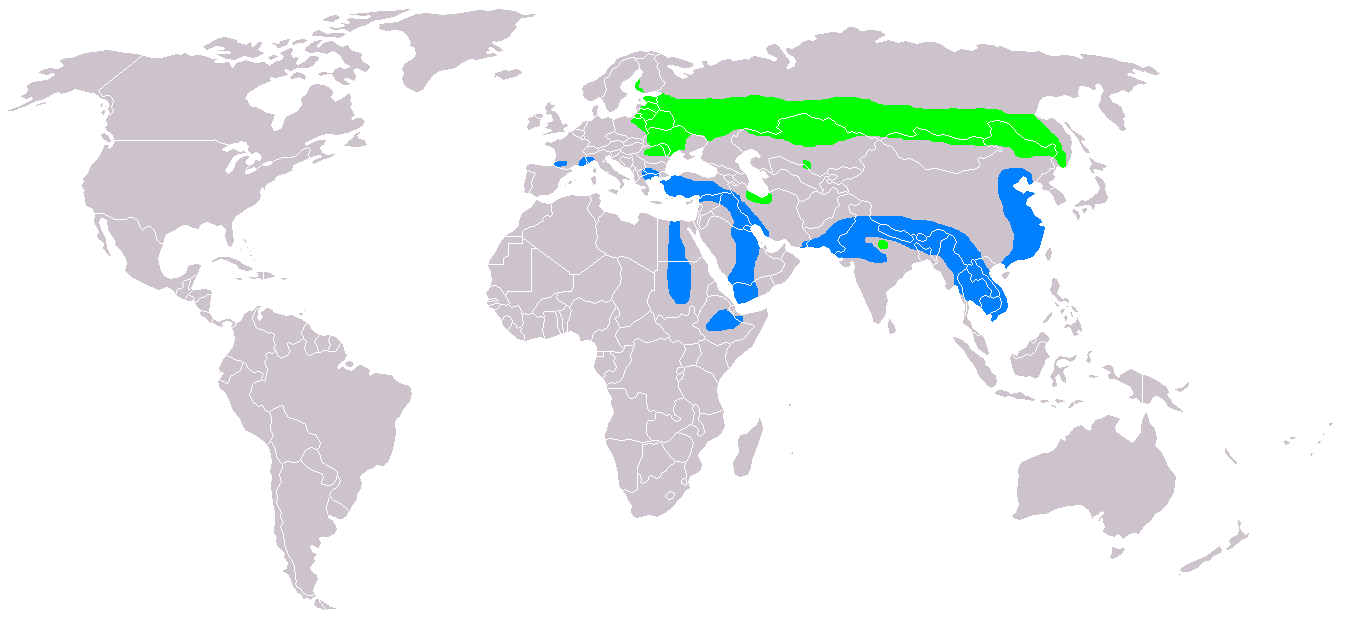
- Range of C. clanga Breeding Passage Non-breeding

Synonyms
- Aquila clanga

= Greater spotted eagle =

Species of bird

The greater spotted eagle (Clanga clanga), also called the spotted eagle, is a large migratory bird of prey in the family Accipitridae.

It is a member of the subfamily Aquilinae, commonly known as "booted eagles". It was once classified as a member of the genus Aquila, but has been reclassified to the distinct genus Clanga, along with the two other species of spotted eagle.

During breeding season, greater spotted eagles are widely distributed across Eastern Europe, parts of Central Europe, central Russia, central Asia and parts of China, along with other isolated areas. During winter, they migrate, primarily to South Asia, Southeast Asia, the Middle East, the upper Mediterranean Basin, and parts of East Africa. Greater spotted eagles favor wetter habitats than most other booted eagles, preferring riparian zones as well as bogs, lakes, ponds, and other bodies of water surrounded by woodland. They breed primarily on floodplains, especially ones that experience high water levels. During winter and migration, they often seek out similar wetland habitats, but have also been observed in dry upland areas such as savanna plateaus.

The eagle is an opportunistic forager, especially during the winter. It will readily scavenge a variety of food sources, including carrion, as well as small mammals (principally rodents), frogs, and a variety of smaller birds (especially water birds), and occasionally reptiles and insects. The eagle is primarily an aerial hunter, gliding from concealed perches over marshes or wet fields to catch prey.

This species builds stick nests in large trees, laying a clutch of one to three eggs. The female of a pair incubates and broods the young while the male hunts and delivers prey. Parents rarely raise more than one fledgling per year. As is common among a few species of raptors, the oldest chick is much larger than its younger siblings, and will often attack and kill the younger siblings.

The greater spotted eagle's range overlaps with the closely related lesser spotted eagle (Clanga pomarina). The two species are known to breed together frequently, forming hybrid offspring, which is detrimental to the population of the rarer greater spotted eagles. The greater spotted eagle is classified as a vulnerable species by the International Union for Conservation of Nature. Its populations are threatened by habitat destruction, collisions with objects, and hybridization with lesser spotted eagles.

== Taxonomy and etymology ==
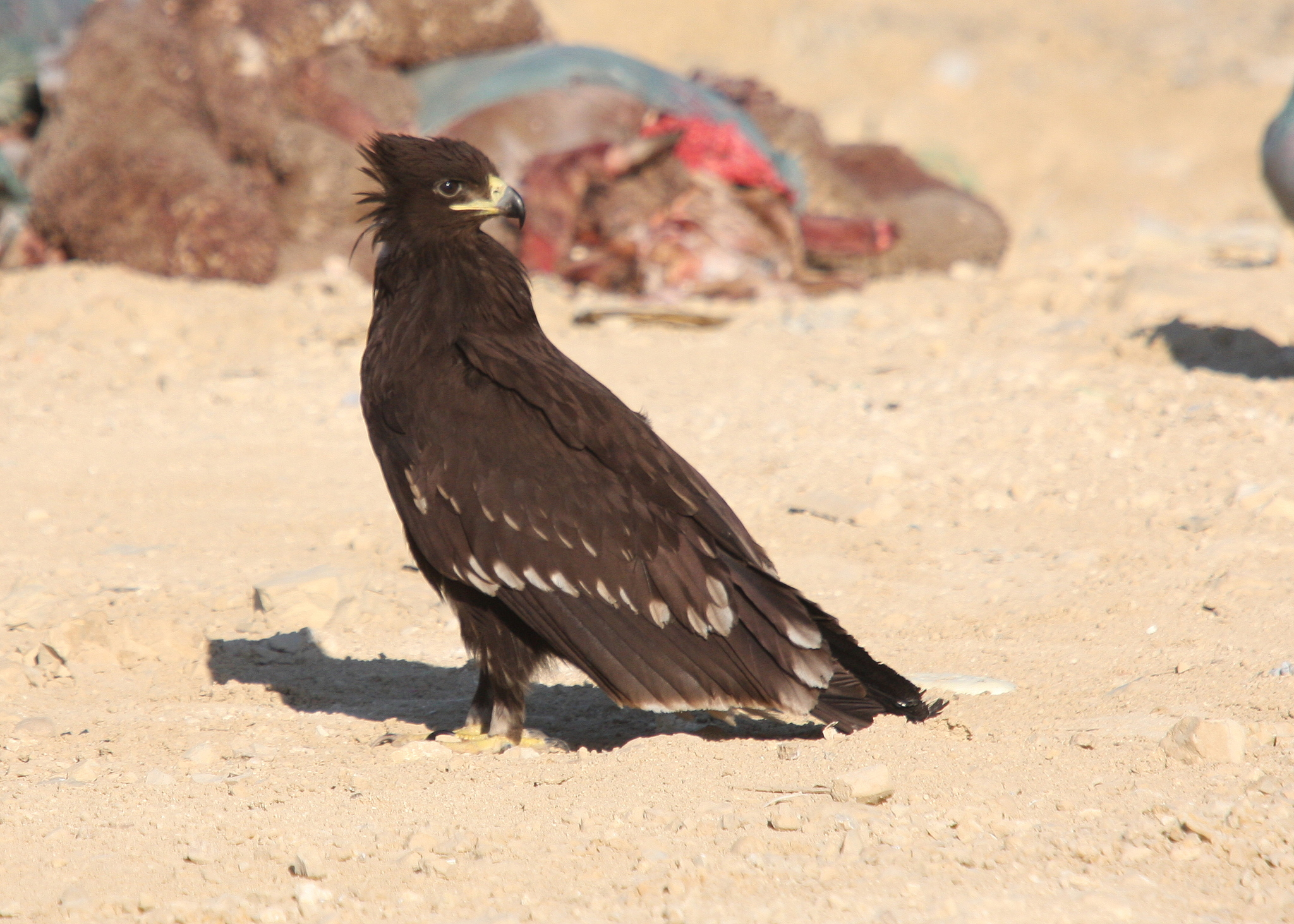
Adult wintering in Oman

Greater spotted eagles are members of the Aquilinae, or "booted eagles", subfamily, a monophyletic group within the larger Accipitridae family. All booted eagles have feathers covering their legs. Members of this diverse, wide-ranging family may be found on every continent except Antarctica. Thirty-eight species of booted eagle are recognized.

Booted eagles are often grouped with the genera Buteo and Haliaeetus, and other more heavy-set Accipitridae, but they may be more closely related to the slenderer accipitrine hawks than previously believed. The greater spotted eagle's closest living relative is the lesser spotted eagle. They are believed to have diverged from their most recent common ancestor around the middle Pliocene, approximately 3.6 million years ago (mya). This "proto-spotted eagle" probably lived in the general region of modern-day Afghanistan, and split into northern and southern lineages when both glaciers and deserts advanced in Central Asia at the start of the last ice age. The northern lineage subsequently separated into the greater (eastern) and lesser (western) spotted eagle species of today, probably around the Pliocene–Pleistocene boundary, almost 2 mya.

Spotted eagles were classified as part of the genus Aquila, along with several other mostly large, brownish eagles. However, molecular phylogenetic studies using one mitochondrial and two nuclear gene sequences showed that the spotted eagles form a monophyletic group with each other and the long-crested eagle (Lophaetus occipitalis). Studies suggest that the spotted eagles should be grouped with Lophaetus, or that all of these species should be grouped within Aquila. Furthermore, a close relationship has been found between the spotted eagles and the black eagle (Ictinaetus malaiensis) native to Asia. The spotted eagles, long-crested eagle, and black eagle may comprise a species complex or clade. The spotted eagles were ultimately reclassified as a distinct genus, Clanga, due to overwhelming genetic evidence and large divergences in morphology and ecology between spotted eagles and their sister taxa. The scientific name Clanga may derive from Ancient Greek κλαγγή (lit. 'scream'), or its root may be the Greek word klangos (a variant form of plangos) for "a kind of eagle" as mentioned by Aristotle.

Extensive hybridization between the greater spotted eagle and the lesser spotted eagle occurs perhaps because the two species have one of the closest relationships of any closely studied Accipitrid taxa, despite significant genetic differences. The mitochondrial genetic sequences of these species have more than 3% divergence, about twice what is considered the minimum genetic difference to distinguish two species. A third spotted eagle, the Indian spotted eagle (Clanga hastata), was recognized as a distinct species from the similarly sized lesser spotted eagle in 2006.

== Description ==
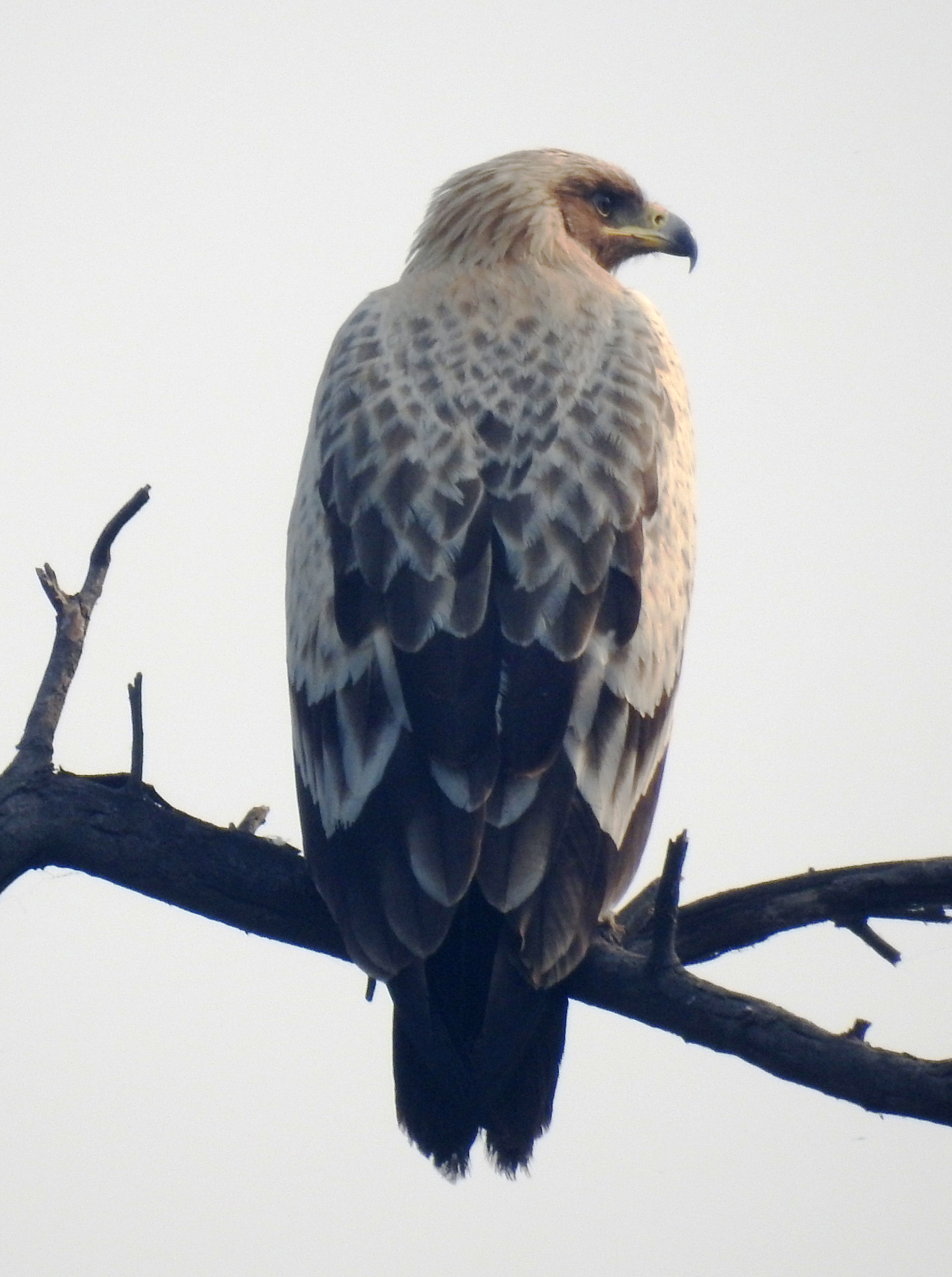
A juvenile greater spotted eagle wintering in India exhibits the highly distinct fulvescens morph plumage.

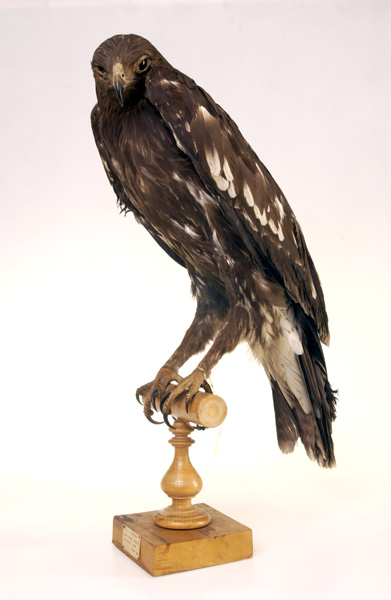
Museum specimen of juvenile

The greater spotted eagle is rather large and compact. Normally, it is black-brown with a contrasting yellow beak. This species has a short neck with a large and often shaggy-naped head, a strong beak, and a short gape-line with round nostrils. The wings are broad and long, reaching the tail tip. The tail is relatively short and rounded. The overall effect of the broad wings and short tail can give them an almost vulture-like silhouette. The feet are large, and the feathers covering the legs are less compactly arranged than on lesser spotted eagles.

Greater spotted eagles tend to perch in the open. Most perches are on treetops at a forest edge, or more isolated vantage points such as a bush, utility pole, or steep riverbank. It is not uncommon for greater spotted eagles to forage from the ground, or rest there in a somewhat hunched posture.

Adult greater spotted eagles are generally a rather uniform dark to blackish brown, though the coloration may appear purplish and glossy. They may appear more starkly contrasted when freshly moulted.

The upperwing covert feathers are often a shade paler than the rest, though these eagles generally appear uniformly dark with two contrasting features: a pale beak and a narrow white U above the tail, though the latter is usually concealed at rest. The species is sexually dimorphic or even polymorphic. Pale and intermediate phenotypes are rare, although they can be slightly more common in eastern ranges.

Pale adults, sometimes referred to as Clanga clanga fulvescens, have bicolored plumage. The tail, flight feathers, and greater wing coverts are all blackish, with the body and the rest of the wing coverts appearing light yellow or pale golden buff, sometimes becoming creamy when aged. The buff colour of the fulvescens phenotype is usually contrasted with diffuse dark coloring around the eyes, on the leading edges of wings, and more rarely and sparsely on the chest. Intermediate and other variants are very rare, but include those with a slightly paler body and variable yellowish-brown streaking or mottling on the fore upperwing coverts (which can make them look similar to juvenile lesser spotted eagles), or mottled yellow-brown with a dark-streaked breast and pale-tipped wing coverts (like the juvenile eastern imperial eagle (Aquila heliaca)). These intermediate types may show the typical dark brown to black on the upper body, but in flight display pale mottled grey wing linings, or even normal coloration apart from the contrasting paler underbody.

The juvenile greater spotted eagle is generally uniformly black-brown with whitish to yellowish drop-shaped spots. Some juveniles appear heavily spotted all over, while others are less so. They always show an obvious row of spots along the upperwing coverts, forming clear wing bars tail and flight feathers, except the outer primaries. Juveniles' feathers underneath are often broadly cream-tipped, often showing some buffy streaks below, especially on the flanks and trousers. In fulvescens-type greater spotted eagles, juveniles are like the pale adult but show the typical heavily spotted wings and tail of typical juveniles, and often show some darker centers to the scapulars and median coverts. By the second to third year, the plumage is often considerably worn but white tips still create sufficiently prominent wing bars (unlike in lesser spotted eagles) until the second winter, when most coverts are then newly molted with smaller pale tips. From about the middle of third year onwards, the plumage is more adult-like with few or no indistinct spots left, but remiges are of unequal age and untidy looking. The subadult is generally more uniform in color, but often still shows some pale tips to the greater coverts. Maturity is obtained by about the fifth year, though sometimes they may not breed until the sixth. The bare parts change little in color at different ages, with eyes being dark brown, while the beak and feet are yellow in all ages.

In flight, this is a large, dark raptor (often looking bigger than its true size) with a well-protruding head, long wings (which often look shorter due to their broadness), slightly bulging secondaries, and rather squared seven-finger tips, although juvenile wings can look more rounded. On the wing, greater spotted eagles appear heavy-bodied, often appearing suspended below the wings and with a relatively short, broad tail. They have quick wing beats with little upstroke and appear to have comparatively lighter flight actions than steppe eagles (Aquila nipalensis), but appear somewhat heavier, less graceful, and less Buteo-like than lesser spotted eagles. Greater spotted eagles soar on almost flat wings, with hands often slightly lowered and their primaries well spread. When gliding, the wings are bowed with a clear angle between arms and hands, emphasizing the wings' short look.

On their upperwings, greater spotted eagles variably show a pale primary patch formed mainly by white based shafts and partially pale outer webs. This is seen at all ages but is much smaller and less obvious on adults. The underwing almost invariably has a single white crescent formed by the white base of the outermost three primaries, the secondaries, and the innermost primaries. At close range, nine to eleven dense narrow dark bars fading toward wing tips are visible. When seen in flight, the normal adult is uniformly blackish with a faint pale U above the tail, barely paler wing coverts, and paler quills. It is not unusual for adults to have slightly paler wing linings, similar to lesser spotted eagles, but only a single (not double) whitish crescent at the base of primaries. In fulvescens (pale) morph adults, most of the wing coverts on both surfaces and body are contrastingly buffy to tawny.

Juveniles on the wing normally appear very dark with liberal spotting above and below, though some juveniles appear with spots restricted to wings, scapulars, and trousers. All juveniles, when seen well, show characteristic white end spots on wing coverts forming two to three wing bars. Otherwise, the juvenile has a creamy trailing edge to the wings and tail. Below, juvenile greater spotted eagles have largely black (apart from the creamy crissum) wing linings contrasting with paler grayer-soot flight feathers. Other juvenile plumages are variably paler but with quills as those of a typical juvenile.

Birds that breed in the Volga–Ural area are slightly larger and more muted in plumage characteristics. Slightly smaller individuals seem to be prevalent farther west in Europe. There appears to be a near 5% size difference in favor of Indian wintering birds over Middle Eastern ones.

=== Size ===
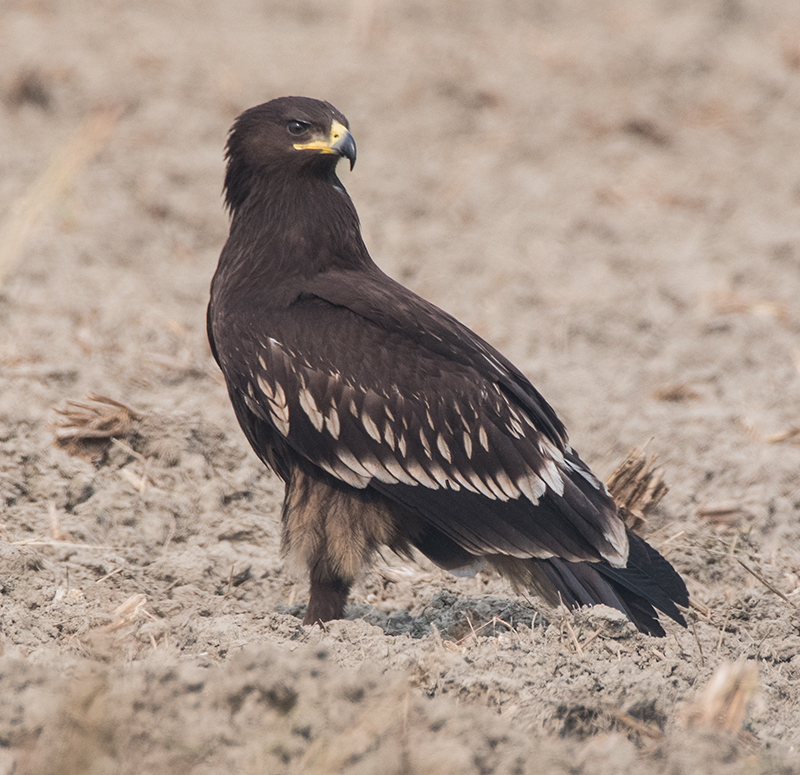
Greater spotted eagles are large raptors and medium-sized eagles.

The greater spotted eagle is a medium-sized eagle, but also a large raptor. This species shows strong sexual dimorphism in favor of the female in size, though the plumage is similar between sexes. The size difference is up to 26% linearly, and females can be as much as twice as heavy as the males, making them rival the martial eagle (Polemaetus bellicosus) as possibly the most sexually dimorphic member of the Aquilinae. However, the largest male greater spotted eagles can overlap in most linear and mass measurements with smaller females. The total length of full-grown greater spotted eagles can vary from 59 to 74 cm (23 to 29 in). In wingspan, males have been reported to measure 155–177 cm (61–70 in) while females can measure 167–185 cm (66–73 in). Body mass for males has been reported to range from 1,537 to 2,000 g (3.389 to 4.409 lb), while females range from 1,820 to 3,250 g (4.01 to 7.17 lb). Among standard measurements, wing chord can range 477–519 mm (18.8–20.4 in) in males and 507–545 mm (20.0–21.5 in) in females. The shortish tail varies 227–249 mm (8.9–9.8 in) in males and 235–268 mm (9.3–10.6 in) in females. The fairly long tarsus is 97–105 mm (3.8–4.1 in) in males and 96–112 mm (3.8–4.4 in) in females. Reportedly, the culmen length can range from 32.5 to 39 mm (1.28 to 1.54 in).

=== Vocalizations ===
The greater spotted eagle is quite noisy when breeding and is often very vocal in winter, especially when in small loose flocks. The most common call, often heard during intraspecies conflicts, is a soft, one-syllable, penetrating, high-pitched, urgent whistle, variously transcribed as kyack, kluh, tyuck, or dyip. The call is not unlike that of lesser spotted eagles but is slightly deeper and more ringing. The calls are higher pitched than steppe eagles' and much higher pitched than those of the eastern imperial eagles (Aquila heliaca), the latter having a guttural call somewhat reminiscent of a frog. Additionally, a similar three-syllable bark is seemingly used to warn off intruders at a feeding site, sometimes considered a harsh chrr-chrr-chaa-chaa, kyak-yak-yak, and kyew-kyew-kyew. The cumulative effect of the repeated call has been compared to that of a "small hound". As with many raptors, the female's tone is lower pitched and hoarser. One individual greater spotted eagle recorded over two days was found to utter an unusual ringing call that sounded remarkably similar to the first two syllables of the typical call of the crested serpent eagle (Spilornis cheela).

=== Identification ===
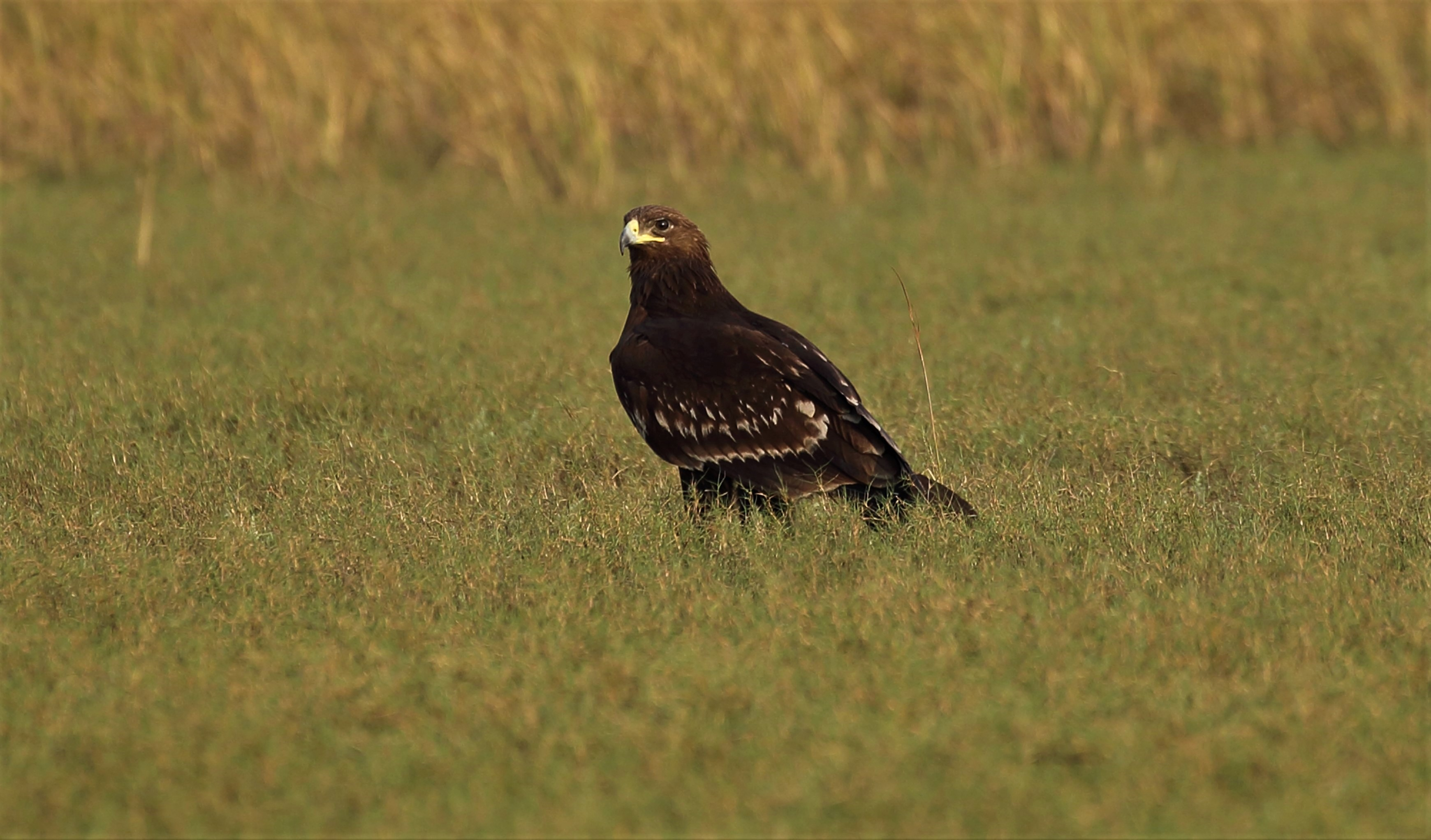
A characteristic young greater spotted eagle, showing its dark colouring and extensive white wing markings.

Field identification of greater spotted eagle can be quite difficult. This species is primarily differentiated from lesser spotted eagles by its structure and proportions, though distant birds may be practically indistinguishable. Compared to the lesser spotted eagle, the adult appears very broad winged, which in turn makes the head look relatively small. However, greater spotted juveniles can appear less bulky, narrower, more rounded along the wing, and longer-tailed, making their proportions closer to the lesser.

Greater spotted eagles can be clearly larger in size, with females effectively dwarfing most lesser spotted eagles, but there is a broad size overlap between the two species. In some cases, male greater spotted eagles can be scarcely any larger than male lesser spotted eagles. Side-by-side, greater spotted eagles are typically conspicuously darker than lesser spotted eagles, and notable for their dark uppertail coverts, lack of nape patch, blackish-brown uniform arms, and uniform, dark upperwing coverts (not contrastingly rusty brownish). Although difficult, intermediate greater spotted eagles can be distinguished from young lesser spotted eagles by the former's morphology, usually darker wing linings, and differences in appearance of primary patch and carpal arc. The juvenile usually lacks the pale nape patch of the lesser spotted eagle, but it is sometimes present, "albeit only slightly paler than rest of plumage and never ochre or orange". Typically, the spotting and barring pattern is much stronger in juvenile greater spotted eagles, but this is not always reliable.

Hybrids of the two spotted eagles can be more difficult to distinguish, and are often muddled and varied in appearance, with some hybrids being much closer in appearance to one species or the other. Pure greater spotted eagles can be told from pure lesser spotted eagles via in-hand measurements such as bill height, width and extent of white spots on the juvenile, and the length of middle toe.

The greater spotted eagle on the Indian subcontinent might be confused with Indian spotted eagles. The Indian species is smaller (similar in size to the lesser spotted eagle), somewhat narrower-winged and longer-tailed, with primary fingers more deeply cut and square-ended. The Indian species has a more distinct pale window in primaries, paler and less distinctly streaked underparts, and paler upperparts (more like a steppe eagle in color) with less distinct, more diffuse pale tips to the larger wing-coverts. Furthermore, the Indian spotted eagle has a notably deeper gape extending behind its eye.

Compared to non-spotted eagles of similar or larger sizes, the greater spotted eagle tends to be fairly compact in features with proportionately broad (and short-looking) wings, a shortish tail, and an overall darker and distinctly patterned plumage. The steppe eagle is similar to but larger and bulkier than the greater spotted eagle, which has a shorter neck, smaller bill with a shorter gape line, no pale nape patch (seen in adult steppe), narrower and less baggy trousers, and generally much shorter, slightly broader wings. Although visually similar at a distance, the steppe eagle has bolder, more extensive barring on the greyer flight feathers, complete lack of carpal arcs below, paler throat and nape, and larger but more diffuse primary patch.

Greater spotted eagles of the fulvescens and intermediate morphs resemble a large number of eagles, but can be distinguished by underwing colour and pattern—such as their distinct carpal arc and dark, thinly barred quills—from pale or intermediate morphs of the similarly sized tawny eagle (Aquila rapax), which is usually less darkly backed without a defused dark face and possesses more typical, narrower wing proportions. Juveniles of the eastern imperial eagle can resemble fulvescens greater spotted eagles but are larger and appear structurally different. The imperial has much longer and narrower wings, a longer neck, a bigger, more prominent beak with an oblong (rather than oval) nail, a longer and narrower gape line, more conspicuous pale inner primaries, no carpal arc, a brown-streaked breast (though greater spotteds can show some diffuse marks), unmarked tarsal feathering, pale irides, and an obvious pale window on inner primaries. Beyond structural dissimilarities, subadult steppe eagles can be distinguished from paler morph greater spotted eagles by the former's thicker well-spotted quill bars and paler underwing diagonal. In the eastern portion of range, they can be told apart from the even darker black eagle, which is much slimmer and has paddle-shaped wings and a long and clearly barred tail.

== Distribution and habitat ==
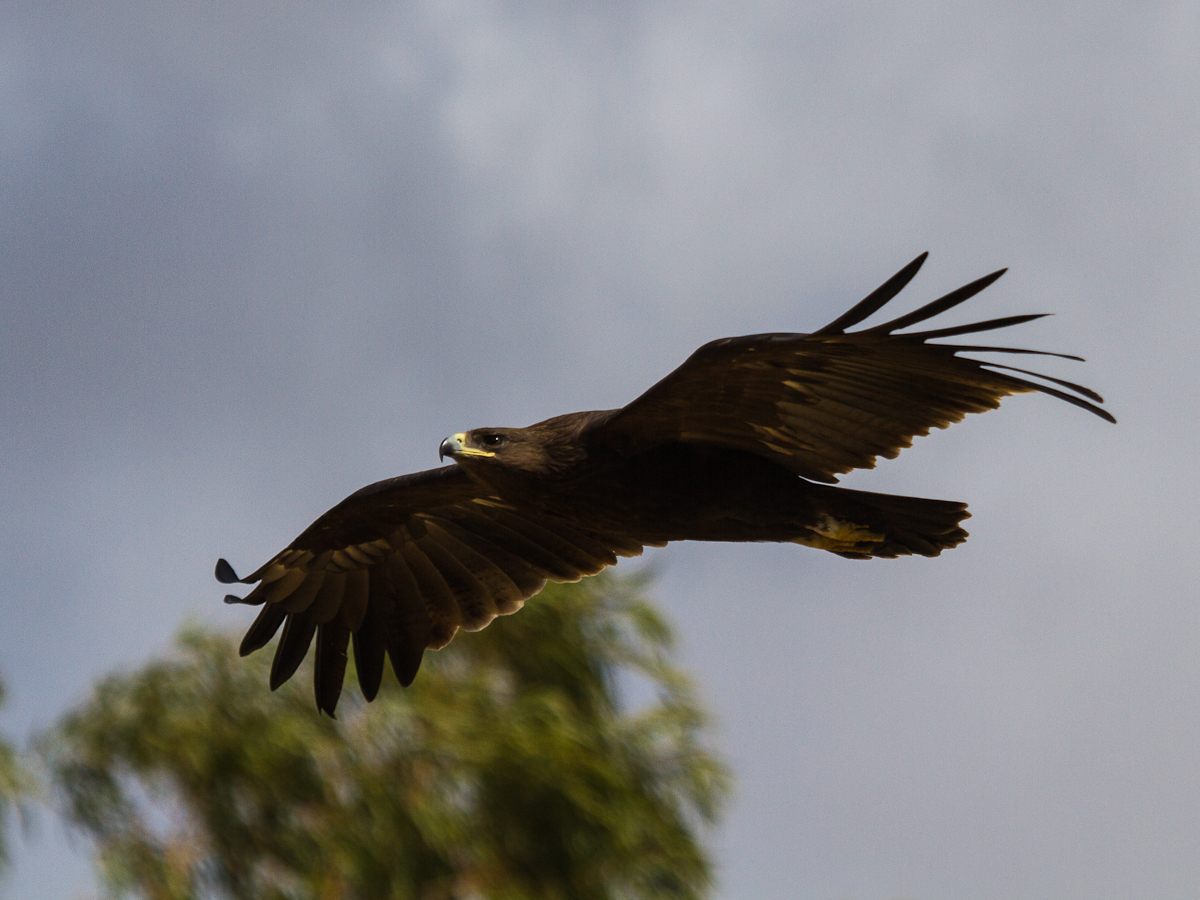
Greater spotted eagle in flight, wintering in Israel.

=== Breeding range ===
This raptor breeds primarily in the Palearctic and the Indomalayan regions. It also breeds in central and southeastern Europe; however, it is highly restricted to small, non-contiguous pockets in Poland, Belarus, Ukraine, Bulgaria, Romania, Serbia, and Hungary. A more continuous breeding range begins in Eastern Europe and includes the eastern parts of Estonia, Latvia, and Lithuania, and central Belarus. An uncertain number of breeding birds spill over into the edge of eastern Finland. They are found broadly throughout European Russia, where habitat is favorable up through much of Arkhangelsk Oblast to as far as the lower coasts of the White Sea. They are found across much of Central Russia, with their probable northern limits being in Shuryshkarsky and Pitkyarantsky Districts. They are also found in a broad strip across southern Siberia reaching well into the Amur region. Their range outside Russia includes much of northern Kazakhstan, with isolated breeding areas known in the East Kazakhstan Region and in southern Kazakhstan. Greater spotted eagles also breed in an isolated area reaching from Kyrgyzstan and adjacent areas of Russia down to Xinjiang in China. At times, greater spotted eagles have been known to breed in the Indian subcontinent, reportedly from Gujarat northwards to Punjab, with recorded breeding as far south as Saurashtra and as far north as Maharashtra. However, this may only be historical, and there is almost certainly not a stable breeding population today. They also breed in northern Mongolia, and rather far into Northeastern China and northern North Korea.

=== Migratory range ===
Greater spotted eagles disperse widely during migration, usually through September to November in the fall, and February to April in the spring. They are found more widely during migration than during breeding or wintering. While migrating, greater spotted eagles may be seen in much of Eastern Europe, Anatolia, and throughout the Middle East, Central Asia (from Kazakhstan south), and western South Asia.

This species is prone to vagrancy, and has been reported in several countries in Europe including the Netherlands, Great Britain, Gibraltar, and the Czech Republic. Its regular breeding range no longer extends as far westwards as Germany, but birds are still occasionally seen there with a few records per decade. Young birds also disperse widely; the Staatliches Museum für Tierkunde Dresden has a specimen (C 21845) shot in November 1914 near Bernsdorf in Saxony. It is a juvenile, and though its exact age cannot be determined, it is heavily spotted and probably less than 20 months old.

Additionally, vagrancy has been reported in Africa, including in Morocco, Algeria, Tunisia, Libya, Cameroon, Chad, Kenya, Tanzania, Zambia, and Botswana. It is sometimes documented in central and east Afghanistan. They also may also be found in East Asia across the southern part of the Russian Far East, eastern China, and occasionally in Southeast Asia from Myanmar and Thailand down through the Malay Peninsula. Occasionally, greater spotted eagles are documented even in Indonesia (i.e. Sumatra).

=== Wintering range ===
Dedicated wintering areas tend to be more limited and isolated than their range during migration. The central wintering areas are principally the Mediterranean Basin, the Middle East, and the Indomalayan realm. Small pockets may exist in southwestern Spain and bordering Portugal, South France, northeastern Italy, western Greece (where it is sometimes considered the most common wintering eagle), small areas of southern Bulgaria, eastern Romania, and southern Moldova. Other wintering areas including northeastern Egypt, southern Sudan and adjacent South Sudan, north-central Ethiopia, and scattered areas of the Middle East including northern Israel, Kuwait, and central Syria. More continuously, they are found through much of the southern coastal Arabian Peninsula, including broadly along the Red Sea coast in Saudi Arabia, west and southern Yemen, southern Oman, coastal United Arab Emirates, and eastern Saudi Arabia. Furthermore, they winter in southeastern Turkey, Azerbaijan, southeastern Georgia, eastern Iraq, broadly in western, northern and eastern Iran, southern Turkmenistan, western Afghanistan, and far western Pakistan. They are also found discontinuously in eastern Pakistan, northern India, Bangladesh, southern Bhutan, and into northwestern Myanmar. In India, the winter range is through the Indo-Gangetic Plain to Bihar, Jharkhand, West Bengal to Assam (including the North Cachar hills), and northeastern hill states extending south through central India. They were once reasonably common in the Malabar and Carnatic coasts but likely only before a hundred years ago. After another gap, they are found in much of southern and central Myanmar, central and southern Thailand, southern Laos, the northern tip of Vietnam, discontinuously in southeastern Vietnam and much of Cambodia, and southern coastal Malaysia. In China, wintering greater spotted eagles range from Jiangsu and Anhui continuously down to northern Guangdong across to Taiwan, and rarely in Korea.

=== Habitat ===
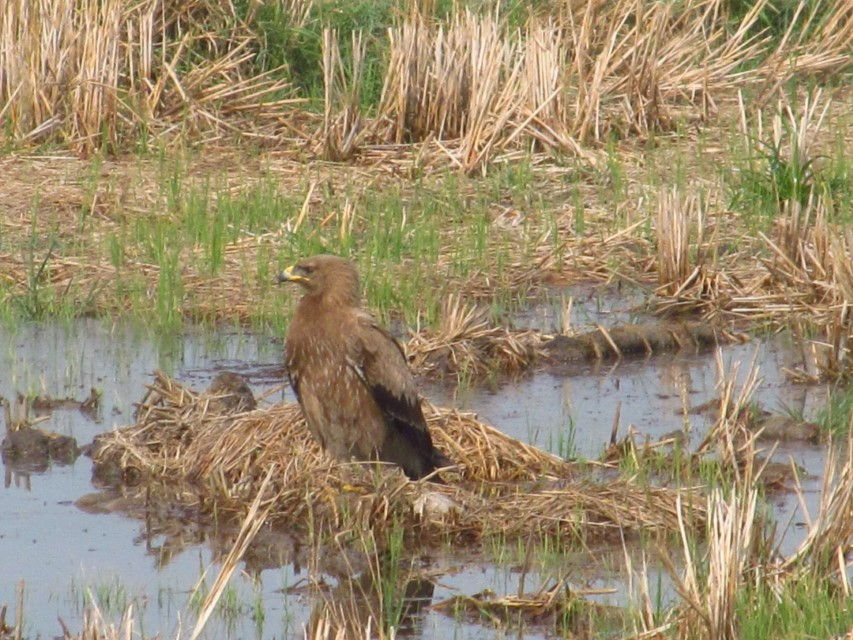
A greater spotted eagle in Karumady, Kerala, India. This species is often at home in wetland-type habitats.

Greater spotted eagles are found in open wet forests and forest edges, often adjoining marshes, swampy patches, bogs, or wet meadows, as well as river-valley woodlands and floodplain forests. They are generally found in wetlands more often than lesser spotted eagles, but can be found in drier hillside forests in Central Asia. The difference in habitat preferences between these species was confirmed in northeastern Poland, where greater spotted eagles nested in wooded areas on floodplains with considerably more annual flooding than those nested in by lesser spotted eagles.

Although typically scarce while breeding in areas modified by heavy human development, they have been seen hunting over cultivated land in Estonia and migrating over lowland farms in the Czech Republic. In Russia, they are found in transition zones between taiga forest and open steppe (often around river valleys), in pine forests, near dwarf forests, in wet, wooded areas of the steppe, and in forested swamps. In Kazakhstan, riparian forests in lowland steppes and forest-steppes mosaics are their primary habitat.

In winter, much like during breeding, they usually occur in wetter habitats than most other eagles, including forested river deltas, mangrove forests, marshes, lakeshores, and, in India especially, jheels. However, greater spotted eagles have also been documented in semi-arid Acacia savannas in northeastern Africa. Reportedly in Eritrea, they occur in open moorland, around villages, and lowland grasslands, while in Sudan they are usually in shrubby areas. One seen wintering in Ankara, Turkey, was in an upland forest area. In the Mediterranean Basin, a study found that the preferred habitats of wintering greater spotted eagles were salt marshes and coastal lagoons with freshwater areas. They are not uncommon in paddy fields and sometimes garbage dumps in Asia during winter, being much more adaptable to human-modified areas in this season, though by and large prefer assorted wetlands, mudflats, large rivers, estuaries, and mangroves. In Arabia, they are largely found now in manmade habitats—such as sewage farms, reservoirs, and agricultural land—since the native mangrove and Phragmites reed-beds that once lined the coastal bays have been almost entirely eliminated. In southern Iran, they are usually found in mangrove areas. A key habitat in Iraq is the Mesopotamian Marshes. Wintering habitats in Israel are the wettest available valleys and damp open zones, chiefly cultivated fields and fishponds near patches of trees, with similar habitats used in Oman.

Greater spotted eagles are typically found from sea level to 300 m (980 ft) and are characteristically a lowland bird. However, they have been recorded at elevations up to 4,000 m (13,000 ft) in northern Iran. One greater spotted eagle was recorded on migration at 4,370 m (14,340 ft) in Ladakh in the Himalayas.

== Migration ==
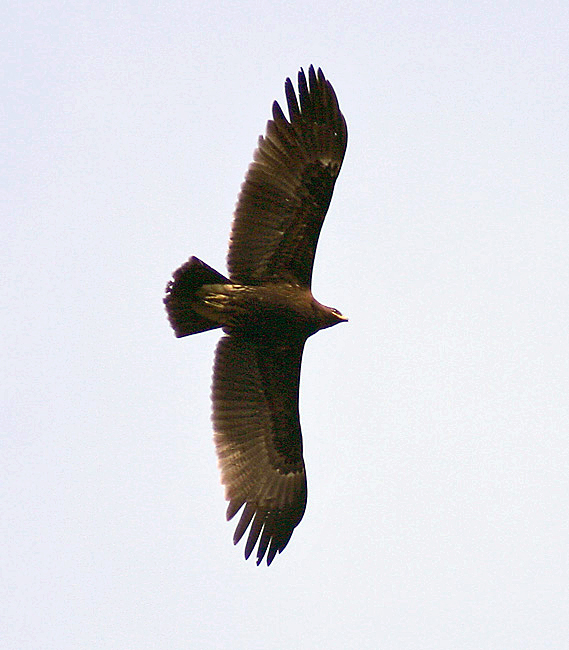
Underside of adult wintering at Bharatpur (Rajasthan, India).

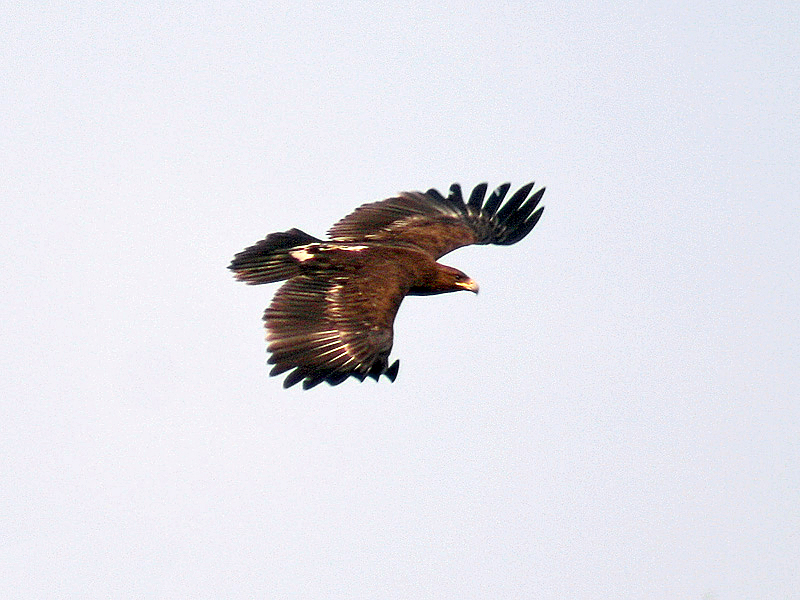
Upperside of adult wintering in Bharatpur (Rajasthan, India). Note the light wing stripes.

Greater spotted eagles are almost entirely migratory birds. However, they are not considered long-distance migrants compared to other birds of prey. They migrate between late August to October, occasionally lasting into November. The return flight typically starts in early February, peaking in March and ending in April. However, migration has been documented well into May, near the Bosphorus in Turkey. On average, migration peaks earlier in the eastern end of their range, such as in Bhutan, where the largest numbers are seen in late February. They migrate around two weeks later than lesser spotted eagles and return earlier than that species as well. At known migration stopovers, lesser spotted eagles almost always outnumber greater spotted eagles.

Greater spotted eagles who breed in Europe may migrate to southern France (especially Camargue), Spain, Italy, and sometimes Sweden. Western breeding birds also regularly end up in North Africa, with a few in Morocco, Egypt, the Nile Valley, Sudan, Ethiopia, and occasionally points further south. Birds from various origin sites may end up in the Middle East (mainly Arabia), South Asia (from Pakistan, most often Punjab and Sind, northern India, and Nepal), east to Indochina, the Malay Peninsula, and southern and eastern China. Greater spotted eagles on an Eastern European track predominantly migrate to the Middle East or Northeast Africa, while others migrate through the Carpathian Mountains to the Balkan Peninsula, and some continue through Central Europe and Western Europe to Southwestern Europe. The main wintering sites of the Asian populations are located in the Arabian Peninsula, Indian subcontinent, Indochina Peninsula, and East China.

During migration, greater spotted eagles commonly cover around 150 km (93 mi) per day but can cover up to 350 km (220 mi) within a day. The flight speeds of migrating eagles of the species was documented as 26.6–45.5 km/h (16.5–28.3 mph) in the Baikal region, with peak movements times from noon to 6:00 PM.

There is limited information on discrepancies in how different ages and sexes migrate. Fewer numbers are generally recorded in spring migration compared to autumn migration. Generally, migrants of the species move on broad fronts in singles or pairs, but groups as large as 10 have been seen northbound over Bhutan in late February. In Malaysia, immatures outnumbered adults six to one. At Lake Baikal, 96% of migrating greater spotted eagles were observed to be adults, an imbalance that concerned researchers. Greater spotted eagles tend to be scarce at traditional migratory bottlenecks such as Bosphorus and the straits of the Red Sea. Old claims of as many as a thousand migrating eagles in the fall at Bosphorus are possibly erroneous (although there has possibly been a reduction of up to 75% from historic peak migrating numbers). In South Baikal in Irkutsk Oblast, Russia, greater spotted eagles accounted for only 0.2% of the observed migrating raptors in autumn migration (7–34 individuals annually; 137 individuals over 8 years). The largest (modern?) counts were 86 and 74 at Suez, Egypt, in autumn and spring, respectively, with smaller numbers recorded crossing into Africa at Bab-el-Mandeb, although a maximum of 85 has been recorded in northern Israel in autumn.

An adult captured near Mecca in western Saudi Arabia in late October was radiotracked 850 km (530 mi) to Yemen, where it remained from late November until early February, before returning 5,526 km (3,434 mi) via southern Iraq, across the Iranian highlands, skirting the south edge of the Aral Sea, and finally flying to its Siberian breeding area near Omsk, covering 4,516 km (2,806 mi) of the return journey in less than a month. Satellite tracking of an eagle breeding in Estonia confirmed it consistently used the same wintering ground in coastal Catalonia, Spain, over seven consecutive years. Despite some individual devotedness to wintering grounds, one radiotracked individual initially trapped in the United Arab Emirates was found the following winter to go instead to Pakistan from its Kazakh breeding grounds, showing some variability in this regard.

A wintering greater spotted eagle in southwest Saudi Arabia (from a Western Siberia breeding area) was found to utilize an average home range in winter of 65 km^{2} (25 sq mi), which contracted 24% before it migrated in the spring, taking from late February to late April to migrate over 5,500 km (3,400 mi). Wintertime territory in Spain was found to be smaller, at 27.2 km^{2} (10.5 sq mi).

The southernmost migration record of a greater spotted eagle was one that traveled 9,270 km (5,760 mi) from the Biebrza National Park in Poland to Zambia in southern Africa. Several other purportedly greater spotted eagles were tracked to several areas of Africa, but nearly half were actually hybrids with lesser spotted eagles and were migrating in more typical fashion and location to that species.

Improbably, at least seven records show immature greater spotted eagles staying through the summer in Saudi Arabia. Similarly, records show lingering numbers of this species into at least May in Peninsular Malaysia.

== Dietary biology ==
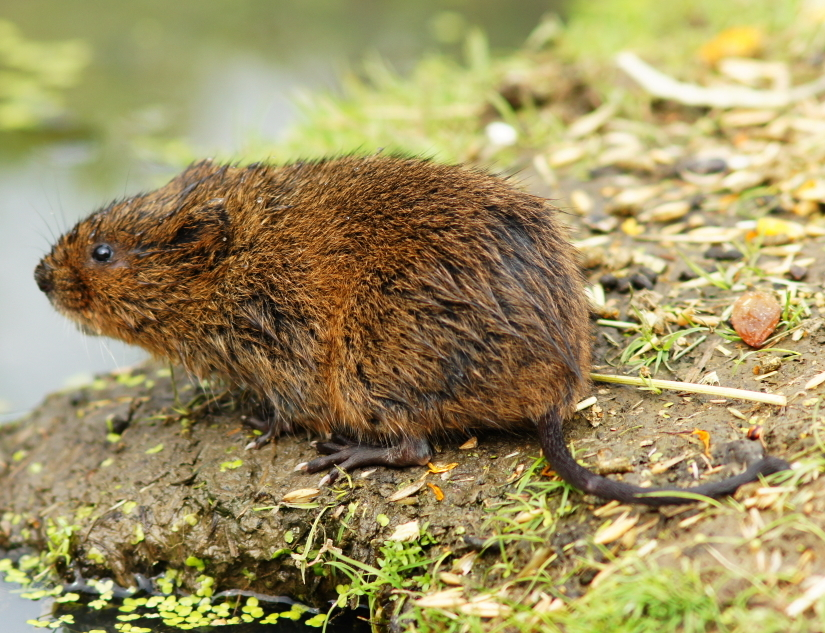
Large water-dwelling rodents such as European water voles are significant food for breeding greater spotted eagles, along with smaller upland vole species.

The greater spotted eagle is a slightly opportunistic predator but tends to favor rather particular prey types. Their diet tends to be composed mostly of small mammals. Despite some dietary similarities with the lesser spotted eagle, the greater spotted eagle's diet includes more birds and favors larger prey. Beyond mammals and birds, the greater spotted eagle will sometimes prey on amphibians, reptiles (mainly small-to-mid-sized snakes), and occasionally small fish and insects. Pellets are considered the most reliable way to determine the diets of greater spotted eagle, as prey remains alone can be biased towards birds.

As can be expected by their habitat preferences, greater spotted eagles tend to eat vertebrates associated with water. Generally, its prey spectrum is somewhat diverse, at slightly fewer than 150 known prey species; this is more diverse than the known diet of the steppe eagle, similar in diversity to that of the lesser spotted eagle, and possibly about half as diverse of the diet of the eastern imperial eagle.

Greater spotted eagles hunt mainly on the wing, quartering over relatively open ground (somewhat like a harrier) or soaring high above and dropping or diving steeply when prey is spotted. Brown and Amadon describe the hunting greater spotted eagle, saying: "Although not a very active species it is not exactly sluggish, and on the wing it has the look of a true eagle." Greater spotted eagles will scatter waterfowl by stooping low over their flock, then selecting isolated individuals to attack. Sometimes the greater spotted eagle still-hunts from a perch, a method more commonly employed by other eagles of similar distribution, and often hunts on foot as well. It mostly takes prey on ground or water. The species also sometime carries out kleptoparasitic attacks on other birds of prey. Although scavenging for carrion seems to occur almost aseasonally, it is likely more prevalent during non-breeding times, when the eagles mostly bring fresh prey to their nests. Along with other predators such as steppe eagles, greater spotted eagles are often attracted to grass fires and swarming locusts during non-breeding times.

During the breeding season in Biebrza National Park in Poland, hunting behaviours were studied. It was found that the peak flying and hunting times were 10:00 AM to 2:00 PM, with the eagles rarely flying before 9:00 AM and often in repose from 2:00 to 4:00 PM. Prey deliveries by the male (the main food provider) may have been more varied than later in the season when the female resumed hunting. In Biebrza, hunting territories were defended from conspecifics, lesser spotted eagles, and other large birds of prey. Per the Biebrza data, the hunting success was 34% for the male up to mid-July, after which success declined to 20%. The hunting success rates of greater spotted eagles seem rather high—the aforementioned 34% for much of the breeding season is much higher than the hunting success rates of golden eagles (Aquila chrysaetos) (around 20%), lesser spotted eagles (24%), and Bonelli's eagles (Aquila fasciata) (28.5%) at comparable times.

It is sometimes stated that they tend to take prey mostly up to only 250 g (8.8 oz). One source estimated that around 22% of prey constituting their diet weighs 63 g (2.2 oz) or less, 37% weighs 63–125 g (2.2–4.4 oz), and around 30% weighs 125–250 g (4.4–8.8 oz), and that generally most prey weighs under 1,000 g (2.2 lb). Based on this source, the mean estimated prey size for the greater spotted eagle may fall around approximately 157 g (5.5 oz).

A large study from Belarus found that the diets of greater spotted eagles were predominantly composed of prey with body masses of 51–200 g (1.8–7.1 oz) (41.9%) and 11–50 g (0.39–1.76 oz) (38.3%). However, the greatest contributor to total prey biomass was from prey weighing 601–1,200 g (21.2–42.3 oz) (34%). In this study, the mean estimated size of prey deliveries by males was 161.2 g (5.69 oz). In contrast, an Estonian study gave an estimate of merely 57.8 g (2.04 oz). The mean prey sizes are roughly similar to those of larger steppe eagles and somewhat higher than those of lesser spotted eagles, which tend to focus on prey weighing under 63 g (2.2 oz) (around 60% of diet); however, the typical prey of most Aquila eagles tended to be slightly higher (eastern imperial eagle) to considerably higher (golden eagle) in weight than the typical prey of greater spotted eagles. Still, sometimes the greater spotted eagle is credited with successful attacks on large prey.

In the largest known food study of greater spotted eagles, the species' diet was studied in three different habitats in Belarusian Polesia, from natural to mixed to modified habitats. 797 prey items were identified in total (but often not to species), and was composed of mammals (40.4%), birds (36.0%), invertebrates (15.8%, mostly beetles), reptiles (5.7%), amphibians (1.3%), and fish (0.9%). Assorted Microtus voles were an important food source—namely the common vole, tundra vole, and East European voles—making up collectively 23.4% of the diet by number. Other significant prey were the European water vole (8.9%), common snipe (4.1%), mallard (3.3%), water rail (3.1%), unidentified small passerines (2.9%), spotted crakes (2.6%), and grass snakes (2.3%). Significant in biomass but less so in numbers were the northern white-breasted hedgehog, European mole, Anas dabbling ducks, grey herons, Eurasian bitterns, and black grouse, with small numbers of very large birds being taken.

In another study, of 102 prey items recorded in Smolenskoye Poozerye National Park in Belarus, the most common were European water voles (38.2%), European moles (7.8%); 5.9% each Sorex shrews, Microtus voles, and unidentified passerine species; and common frogs (8.7%). At a nest in Estonia, of 105 visually identified prey items, Microtus species and further unidentified rodents comprised some 63% by number but only 28% by biomass, while birds formed only 19% by number but 56% by biomass; 45% of avian prey species were medium-sized, such as hazel grouse, grey partridge, northern lapwing, and hooded crow.

Other European studies have been largely confined to wintering greater spotted eagles. In the Amvrakikos Wetlands of Greece, 95 prey items were determined, being composed almost exclusively of water birds. The main prey here were common teal (17.9% by number, 15.9% by biomass), common moorhen (16.8%, 14.9%), Eurasian wigeon (11.6%, 27.4%), unidentified Anas ducks (5.3%, 7.8%), Eurasian coot (4.2%, 8.7%), and little egret (3.2%, 4.7%), with a small contribution by ground beetles, passerines, and snakes.

Over 8 years of study in Natural Park of El Fondo in the Spanish province of Alicante, almost entirely large prey was taken, with few to no small rodents (such as voles). Among the 100 prey items found, the main prey were common moorhen (23.1% by number, 15.2% in biomass), common teal (8.97%, 6.44%), black rat (7.69%, 3.01%), and unidentified Rattus (7.69%, 2.76%). Other notable regular prey were black-headed gull, Eurasian coots, and northern lapwing. Large prey, which made up much of the biomass, were common carp (18.9% of biomass), grey heron (11.7%), and European rabbit (9%).

At nests in Western Russia, a mean total of 53% of the diet was found to be small mammals and 45% was birds. In a study in the Leningrad region, the eagle's diet of 79 prey items was led by European water vole (51%), followed by introduced muskrats (3.9%) and common teal (3.8%), as well as frogs (20.2%), most probably common frogs and some moor frogs.

322 non-carrion prey items were found for greater spotted eagles in the Belaya River, 59% of which were mammals. The diet was largely European water vole at 32.6%, followed by smaller voles and mice. It was found that the Belaya eagles ate a large balances of reptile prey (19.5%)—in fact, 15% of all vertebrate prey were European adders. The eagles took average sized snakes but were not seen to prey on small snakes, nor to take many particularly large snakes; they were often seen grasping snakes about the head. In Belaya, only 6.5% of the diet was birds, mainly significant only in the Oka Nature Reserve. The eagles of the region also occasionally partook in carrion feeding, including moose carcasses.

In a compilation study from the Volga region, Ural Mountains, and Western Siberia, 74.7% of the eagle's diet was mammalian, of 482 prey items. Its main prey species was the European water vole at an average of 32.4% of diet (28.1–36.8%), followed by common vole averaging 11.4% (0–17%), tundra vole at 6.2% (1.9–16.9%), and birds at 16%, most importantly Eurasian coots and Podiceps grebes followed by rooks. In the Tyva Republic, more terrestrial, upland hunting can be projected since the Daurian pika was reportedly the main prey for greater spotted eagles. Similarly, in Khakassia, the greater spotted eagle was said to hunt mostly the long-tailed ground squirrel, the only known part of the eagles' breeding areas where ground squirrels were said to be preferred over voles.

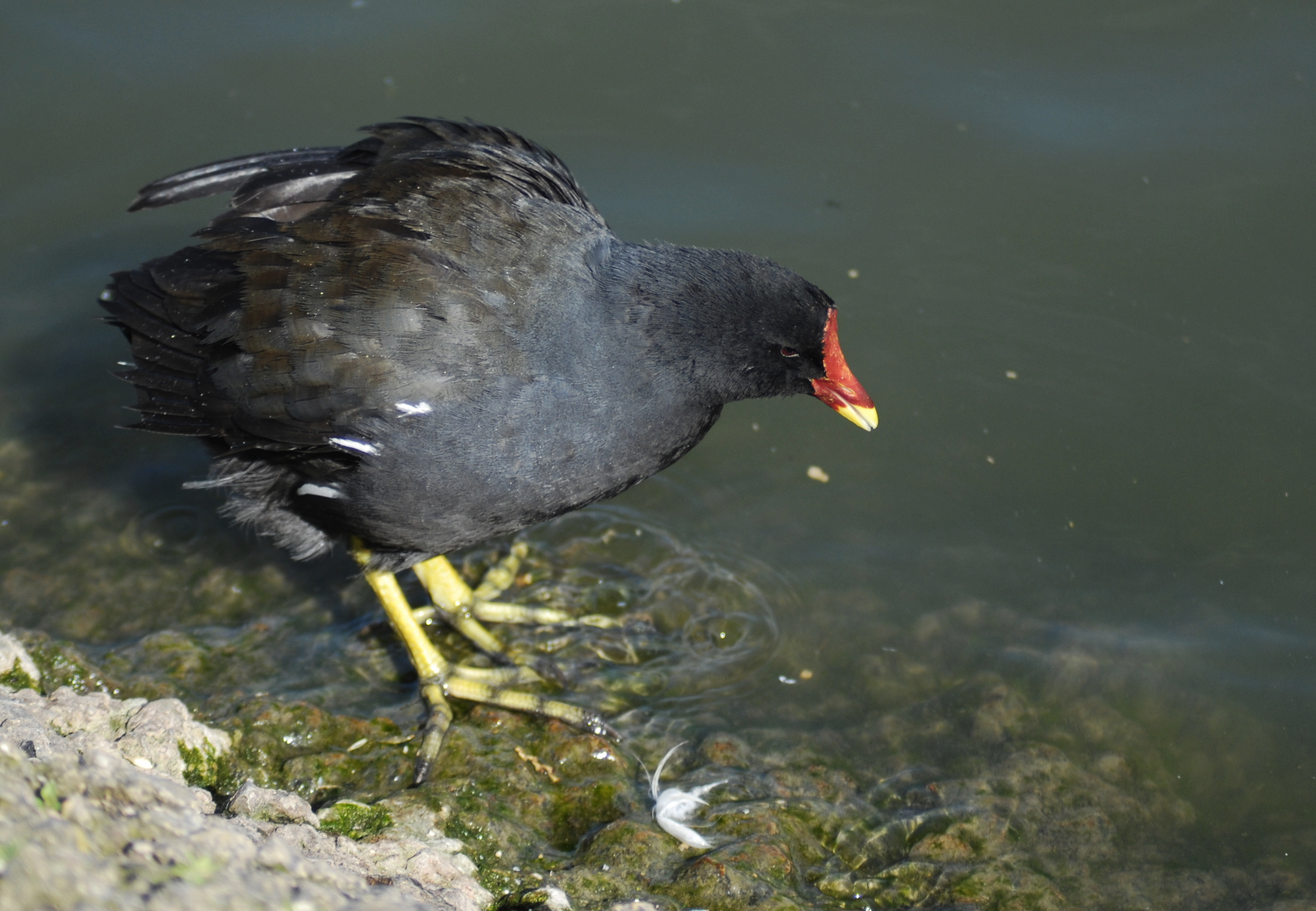
Water birds such as common moorhens are a common component of the diet of greater spotted eagles in almost any season.

Their diet is generally more erratically known in non-European wintering areas. Like many other raptors of similar region, migrating greater spotted eagles typically fast until they reach their wintering terminus point. The most well-studied Asian wintering population of the species in terms of dietary behaviour is likely in Bharatpur, India, particularly in Keoladeo National Park. It was found that greater spotted eagles here occupied a greater range of habitat than other spotted and Aquila eagles. Here, greater spotted eagles are non-territorial and free ranging, and are recorded to exploit the full 9 km (5.6 mi) length of the local marshland. Winter numbers are up to 30 for this species, with their numbers peaking in November and December and then diminishing after January. Like most other wintering migrant raptors here, like milvine kites, the greater spotted eagle becomes a highly opportunistic feeder that shows a preference for easily attainable foods. They regularly come down to carrion, pirate food from other birds, feed on stranded fish, and, perhaps most regularly, hunt and take young herons, storks, and other water birds from heronries. When doing so, the greater spotted eagles often approach in a hover to disrupt the heronry and then, as the heronry settles, suddenly drop onto a targeted nest, defeather the squab (nestling water bird) in the nest, and commence feeding. The Bharatpur greater spotted eagles show a slight preference for slow-moving prey, but also take fast flying birds like waders and ducks. An eagle will test a flock of coots by flying low over the water, continually "buzzing" the birds, until it can attack an isolated individual. Often, they perch extensively on favorite lookout posts, with gum arabic trees favored in Bharatpur. Though they typically hunt by day, some possible nighttime hunting has been inferred for greater spotted eagles in Bharatpur. During inclement weather in Bharatpur, the eagles may pause hunting. As many as 7–10 greater spotted eagles are attracted by a conspecific's heronry kill and subsequently often jostle each other. Often this results in the eagle accidentally dropping the kill into the water, though those dropped onto dry ground frequently become food for wild boars and golden jackals. In one case, two adult greater spotted eagles and a single immature eastern imperial eagle destroyed at least 30 water bird nests in a single day. Out of 79 hours of observation on greater spotted eagles, they spent 49% of the time foraging, increasing to 72% by March due to scarcer foods. Meanwhile, they spent 26.4% of the time resting and 20.6% soaring, with soaring rising to 35% in February. The greater spotted eagles consumed a daily mean of 240 g (8.5 oz) per day, with most foods nourishing them over several days. They reportedly hunted the most diverse prey range of any raptor of the region.

In the Indian subcontinent as a whole, greater spotted eagles are known to freely scavenge carrion, as well as feed on frogs (especially Indus valley bullfrogs), chameleons, Calotes lizards, snakes, rodents, and small mammals. A general aptitude in the region has been reported for avian prey—largely larger rails such as moorhens, Eurasian coots and gray-headed swamphens—as well as waterfowl and (mostly young) storks, herons and egrets; however, upland birds such as rufous treepies, Eurasian collared doves, and Indian rollers also seem to be included. Though rare at large carrion, greater spotted eagles in the Indian subcontinent seem to be attracted to terrapins maimed or partially eaten by Pallas's fish eagles, Egyptian vultures, and red-headed vultures.

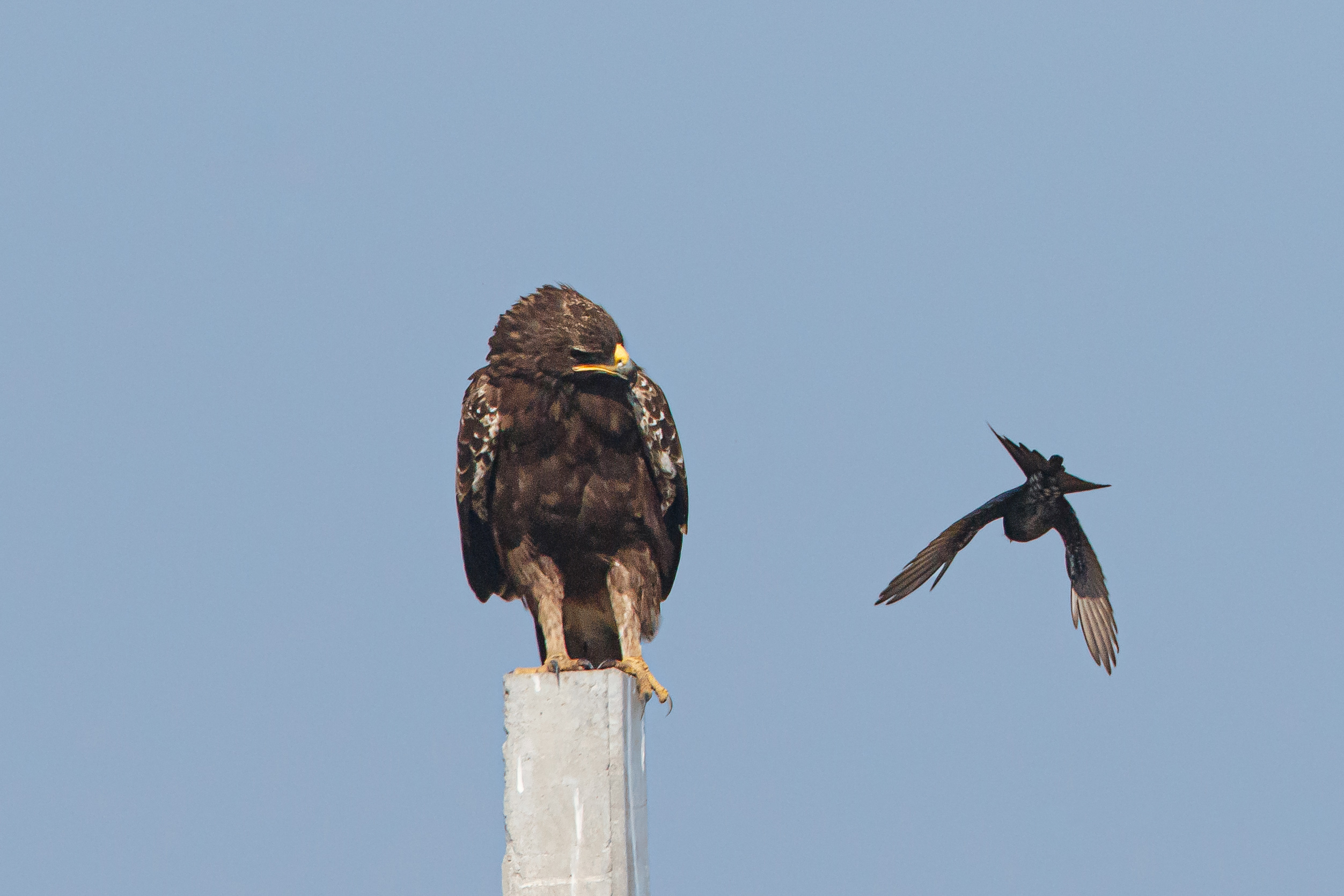
A drongo mobs a wintering greater spotted eagles, which are predators of birds of various sizes.

Anecdotal evidence of the diet of wintering greater spotted eagles was attained in the central plains of Thailand. Here they were seen to eat dead fish in drained ponds as well as to actively hunt and to pirate food from other raptors. They were seen to prey on domestic ducks that became separated from their large farm flocks, as well as to feed on dead lesser whistling ducks found to be killed by poisons meant to kill snails. One farther prey species reported to be likely highly important to this region's greater spotted eagles is the ricefield rat. Despite not being considered to show an aptitude for attacking large or varied prey, sometimes greater spotted eagles seem to be capable of taking very varied and sometimes substantially sized prey.

It has been detected that small invertebrates may be taken at times, including ground beetles, locusts, and non-native red swamp crayfish. The greater spotted eagle takes a range of birds, ranging down to the size of the 18.4 g (0.65 oz) common reed bunting. They can take fairly large water birds up to the size of adult great egrets, grey herons, mallards, and fledgling storks such as painted storks and Asian openbills. Sometimes the greater spotted eagle will attack or scavenge on cranes, though many attempted attacks are reportedly unsuccessful. Scavenging on common crane (Grus grus) carcass and failed predation attempt on adult demoiselle crane (Grus virgo) have been reported. the eagles were also considered a potential threat to the young of red-crowned cranes(Grus japonensis), which are known to furiously defend their chicks.

Outside of avian prey, mammals have been taken ranging from Eurasian harvest mouse and common shrew, weighing no more than 8 g (0.28 oz), up to the European hare, potentially weighing up to 3,000 g (6.6 lb). Sometimes greater spotted eagles may prey upon around a half dozen species of mustelids, mostly assorted weasels and stoats but also including larger species such as minks and martens.

=== Interspecific predatory relationships ===
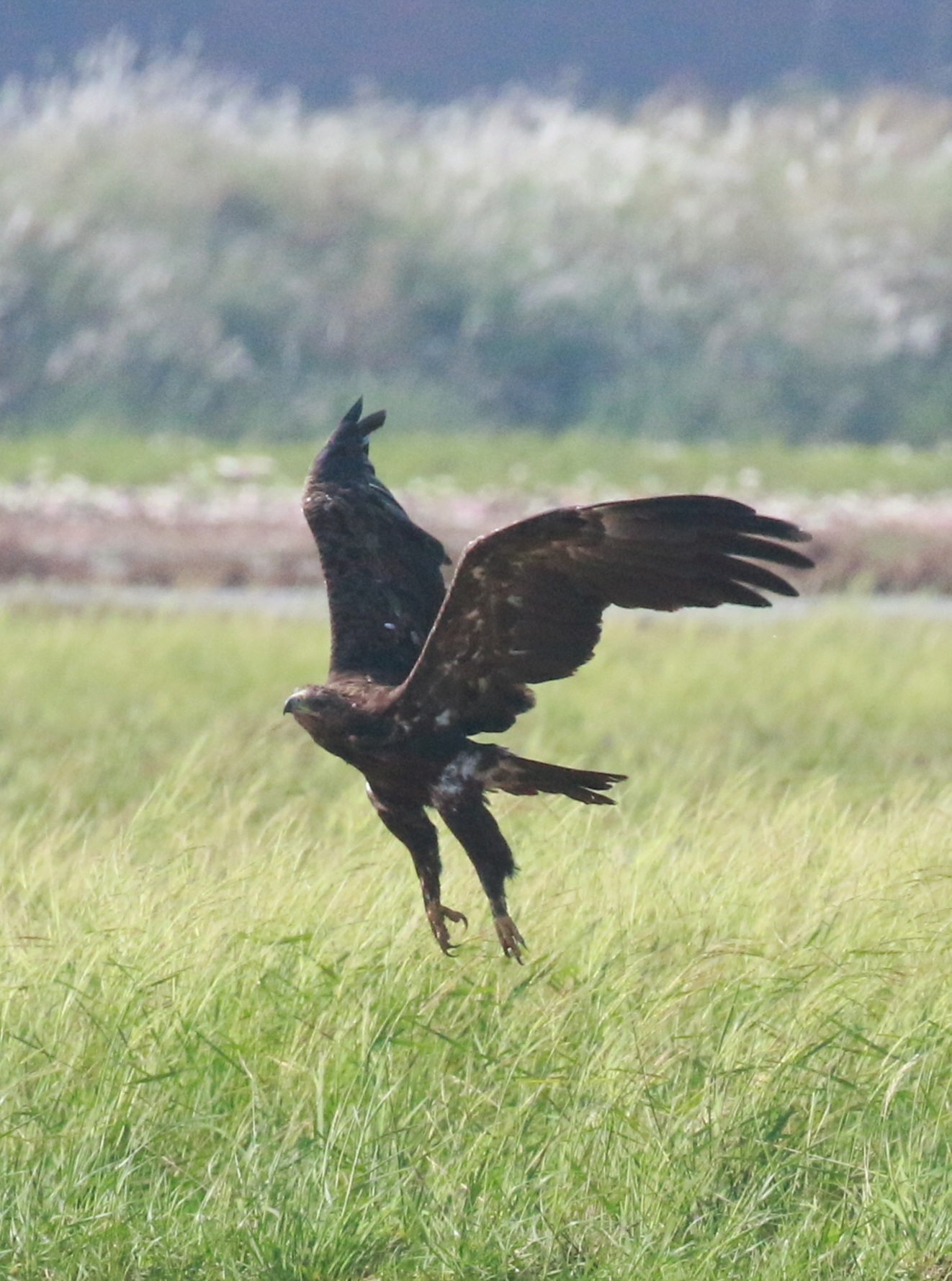
Greater spotted eagles, such as this one in Palakkad, Kerala, often forage alongside and compete against sympatric eagle species.

Greater spotted eagles often overlap broadly with a number of similar eagle species in both its breeding and wintering regions. In the larger portion of its breeding range, the greater spotted eagle is allopatric from the lesser spotted eagle (Clanga pomarina). Where they do overlap, they share a somewhat similar diet, but the greater spotted eagle tends to focus on water-friendly species and to take relatively more birds, whereas the lesser spotted eagle often focuses on voles, small snakes (such as grass snakes), and frogs. As such, the lesser spotted eagle tends to nest in slightly drier environments, usually somewhat away from wetlands and floodplains, adapting rather more readily to patchwork areas where human development has occurred. More similar in central distribution are larger eagles such as the eastern imperial eagle (Aquila heliaca) and steppe eagle (Aquila nipalensis).

Furthermore, these species undertake roughly similar migratory routes, though the steppe eagle is the most populous and regular migrant (in spite of its extreme decline), appearing in numbers from Africa to South Asia, while the greater spotted and eastern imperial eagles appear regularly as far west as the Middle East and scarcely in Africa. However, the greater spotted eagle is clearly partitioned from the other eagles by its favoring of wet and partially wooded habitats and the prey found therein. The eastern imperial eagle also nests in woods, but usually in upland areas, and favors both social and solitary terrestrial mammals and birds, including hares, hamsters, ground squirrels, and hedgehogs as well as pheasants, corvids, and other mid-sized birds. Meanwhile, the steppe eagle favours typically rather dry and very open habitats in the steppe, usually nesting on a rise or outcrop in the flat, sparse habitat, and much favours ground squirrels, supplemented by other small terrestrial species such as pikas, voles, and zokors. Habitat usually keeps these eagles separated from the greater spotted eagle while nesting; however, in winter quarters such as India, the Mediterranean Basin, and the Middle East, considerable convergence does occur.

All three eagles are well-established to be rather unpicky opportunists and scavengers during winter. They freely come to human refuse (favoring livestock carcass dumps), scavenge unclaimed carrion, rob other birds of prey of their catches, kill the young of prey such as water birds, find insect swarms or emergences (the steppe eagle more so than the others), and follow grass fires. Of these three, the steppe eagle tends to be least actively predatory in winter, the eastern imperial eagle tends to be the most likely to continue to live-hunt (and perch most extensively), and the greater spotted eagle somewhere in the intermediate behavioral zone. The greater spotted is the least likely of the three to visit carrion or carcass dumps; but, on the Indian subcontinent, they all heavily share food sources such as nestling water birds. When conflicts arise, the body size of an eagle imparts its position in the hierarchy—the eastern imperial eagle is dominant, followed by the steppe eagle, while the greater spotted eagle is somewhat subservient to both. The three eagles were well studied in Bharatpur, where they competed against the shorter-distance migrant, the Pallas's fish eagle, which vied with the imperial eagles for the dominant raptor position while all the larger eagles dominated the smaller, resident Indian spotted eagles. The black kite, a non-eagle raptor often associated with wintering greater spotted eagles, is attracted to similar feeding opportunities.

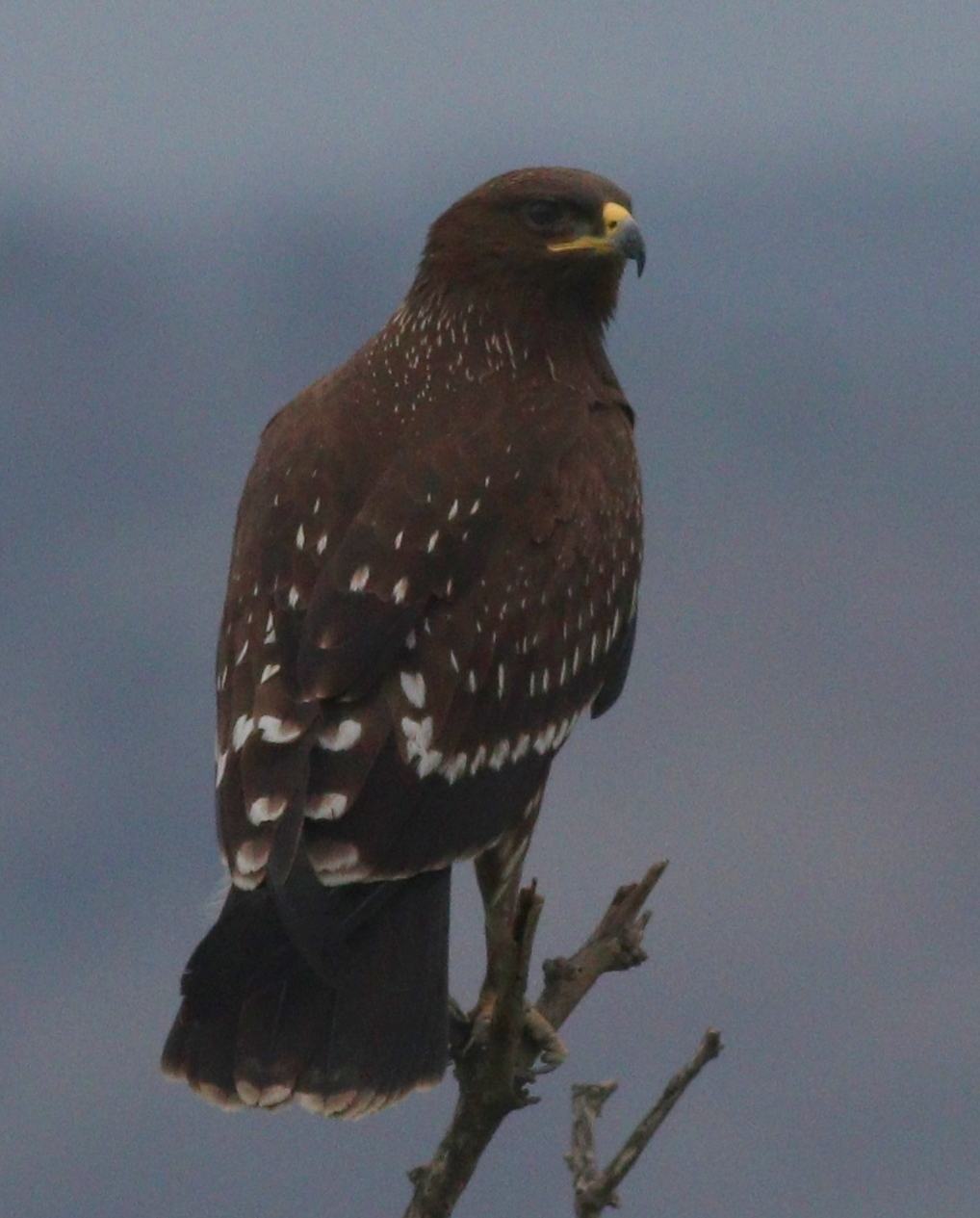
Greater spotted eagle in Israel

While scavenging, greater spotted eagles tend not to come to carrion if Old World vultures are present. Greater spotted eagles are accomplished pirates during the winter season. They often rob a variety of other raptors including black kites, ospreys, western and eastern marsh harriers, and even other eagles, including larger species like white-bellied sea eagles and steppe eagles. Despite their typically inferior position to them, the greater spotted eagle was observed in Bharatpur to often successfully displace the steppe eagle from disputed food, with the steppe eagle being more tractable when gorged. They tend to rob other raptors aerially during their victim's takeoff with prey, exploiting the other bird's attempt to balance itself, during which they yank away the prey and rapidly escape.

More infrequently, greater spotted eagles will target other raptors as prey, including black kites, booted eagles, western marsh harriers, and common buzzards, as well as some owls, like long-eared and short-eared owls. Additionally, they are considered a potential predator of small nestlings of the Eurasian griffon vulture.

Greater spotted eagles themselves have few well-documented predators. While this is probably due in part to scant research, as a quite large and powerful bird of prey, they usually fulfill the role of apex predator. Still, predators of greater spotted eagles include Blakiston's fish owl, white-tailed eagle, golden eagle and Eurasian eagle-owl. Furthermore, European pine martens are known to feed on nestlings of greater spotted eagles.

== Breeding ==
Greater spotted eagles often occur in pairs or solitary, but in winter sometimes occur in small to large flocks, especially around attractive food sources. The species is often seen singly during migration, though sometimes in twos or threes or more.

This species breeds from late April to August in much of its range. However, when breeding in Pakistan and the Indian subcontinent, they may do so in different reports from November to March, sometimes further into June to July, indicating an inconsistent nesting schedule there.

The display of this eagle is not well-known but includes single or mutual high circling, soaring high with the male diving down on half-closed wings towards the female, all with much calling. Territories can be from 15 to 30 km^{2} (5.8 to 11.6 sq mi) in ideal regions, usually within the confines of a protected area, though are much larger elsewhere.

In the past, greater spotted eagle nests have been reportedly found as close as 100 m (330 ft) from each other; in one case, four pairs nested in an area of merely 0.6 km^{2} (0.23 sq mi). A more typical range may be in the zone of 40–52 km^{2} (15–20 sq mi). The density of greater spotted eagles was 4.76 (per confirmed numbers) to 6.15 (per projections based on available habitat) breeding pairs per 100 km^{2} (39 sq mi) of forested area in the Volga–Ural region, while in the Western Siberia region it was 6.55–8.76 breeding pairs per 100 km^{2}. The highest density was in the Volga–Ural area, with up to 3.58–17.01 pairs where the locally preferred habitat (flooded alders) was available. The mean distance between nests in the Volga–Ural area was 7.3 km^{2} (2.8 sq mi). In the Ishim River basin of Kazakhstan, there was 0.54 pairs per 100 km^{2}. In the Kazakh Irtysh pine forests, there was 1.08 pairs per 100 km^{2} in internal forest edges, and a much higher density of 13.23 pairs per 100 km^{2} in forest edges along lakes and bogs in the Irtysh basin.

The highest density of pairs in Kazakhstan is possibly the region of the Ishim River, holding perhaps 39% of the nation's breeding pairs. Furthermore, in well-suited Russian habitats, nests were said (at least historically) to be found every 1.6 km (0.99 mi) of riverside, with fairly consistent pair reuse in following years.

=== Nests ===
The species builds a large stick nest which may measure 70–110 cm (28–43 in) across and up to 100 cm (39 in) deep. Nests appear significantly smaller in the Indian subcontinent, at around 60 cm (24 in) across—shorter than the eagle's own total length—and merely 5–15 cm (2.0–5.9 in) deep.

Unusually, these eagles tend to build nests using fresh branches with foliage or green conifer needles still attached (most other acciptrids prefer sparse or leafless branches while building nests). Nests are lined with green leaves, needles, and grass, as is common in accipitrids, and they may be added to continuously throughout the breeding cycle. The nest is normally located in a tree, usually in the main fork, a large lateral branch, or the top of large broadleaf trees just inside forests.

Russian compilation studies found that about 68.7% of observed greater spotted eagle nests were on deciduous trees, with the remaining in coniferous trees. In the Russian Nizhny Novgorod region, 10 out of 11 observed nests were located on birches and one on a black alder. In Poland, birch (such as downy birch) appear popular in use. In the Volga–Ural area, alder forests were preferred, with 71.4% of pairs with found active nests using it, while in Western Siberia they preferred pine forests (55.9%). Within the Altai-Sayan region, preferred nest trees were birch (50%) and larch trees (31.25%). Gum arabic trees and mango trees were reportedly used in Pakistan, and Mitragyna parvifolia in India, and were reportedly sometimes even on agricultural land.

Russian studies found that nests were almost invariably in floodplain forests. The nest can be 5–25 m (16–82 ft) above the ground or water, though usually 8–12 m (26–39 ft). Nesting sites in the Volga–Ural area averaged 510.7 m (1,676 ft) from the nearest forest edge, but were often in the densest part of the forest stands. From a sample of 83 nests in the Volga–Ural area, the average nest height was 9.58 m (31.4 ft). In Nizhny Novgorod, nest heights were 7–14 m (23–46 ft) above the ground. In Western Siberia, nest height ranged from 3–20 m (9.8–65.6 ft) with an average of 7.22 m (23.7 ft), with nest sites appearing lower in the more conifer-based Western Siberia area. Nest heights were lower still in the Altai-Sayan region, averaging 6.5 m (21 ft).

Rarely, nests are recorded in shrubs in treeless regions. A nest in Altai-Sayan was reportedly only 2 m (6.6 ft) above the ground. Even more rarely, nests have been reportedly located on the ground. At times, they may use the nests of other birds—most likely other birds of prey, but even a Eurasian magpie nest was reportedly once used.

=== Development of young ===
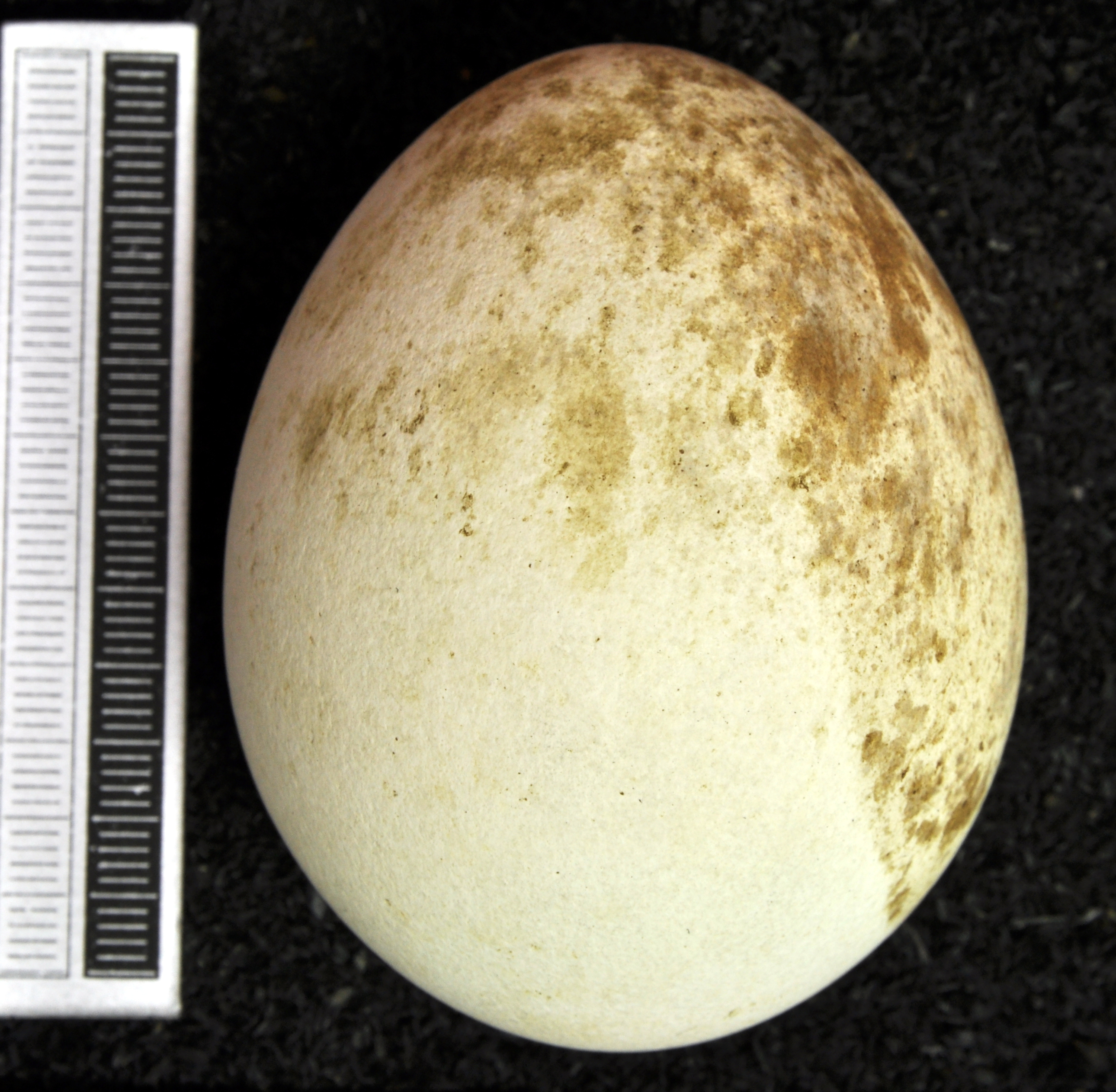
Egg of greater spotted eagle (Collection Museum Wiesbaden)

In Russia, greater spotted eagles reportedly seldom lay eggs until May, but sometimes as early as late April, with similar (if mildly earlier) laying times farther west. The clutch size is typically two, though sometimes the nest contains one to three eggs. Eggs are broad, grayish-white ovoids, and tend to be glossless and often unmarked. However, sometimes they may manifest a few dark brown spots or blotches and sparse grey shell-marks. The eggs may range in height from 63 to 74 mm (2.5 to 2.9 in), and in diameter from 47.8 to 56.7 mm (1.88 to 2.23 in).

The incubation stage lasts 42–44 days per most sources, but in southern Belarus, an incubation stage of only 39 days was documented. Incubation begins with the first egg. The male of the pair was once thought to not take part in incubation (typically, as in many raptors, they primarily have the responsibility of prey deliveries). However, in the aforementioned Belarusian study, the male incubated an average of 57.3 minutes during daylight.

In the Altai taiga region, among six greater spotted eagle territories, the average brood size was 1.33 nestling per successful nest or 1.0 nestling per occupied nest. Two of the Altai greater spotted eagle territories were on the abandoned territories of eastern imperial eagles. Meanwhile, in the Volga–Ural and Western Siberia areas, the mean brood sizes were 1.24 and 1.42, respectively.

The body size between greater spotted eagle nestlings differs markedly when the second eaglet hatches and the younger usually dies, often via siblicide. Competition often resulting in starvation or intentional killing of the younger chick by its elder sibling is not uncommon in birds of prey, especially the eagles, and is often hypothesized as a kind of insurance process wherein the younger sibling acts an insurance if the elder sibling is somehow killed; otherwise, the younger sibling (which is not necessarily in ill health) is possibly expected to die. However, this species raises two fledglings at least somewhat more commonly than the lesser spotted eagle. Out of 50 nests in the Oka Nature Reserve, though, only one pair managed to produce two fledglings in a year.

In an experiment in a nest in Poland, a younger sibling was taken out of the nest to save it. At the time, the younger eaglet weighed 310 g (11 oz) and the older sibling weighed 1,050 g (2.31 lb). After being taken out of the nest, the younger eaglet was raised with minimal interactions, to avoid imprinting, beyond feeding in captivity by humans. The eaglet shared a cage with an eastern imperial eagle and a lesser spotted eagle, both of which were indifferent towards it, and did not in any way care for or feed it. At the point of fledging, the eaglet was successfully reintroduced to its own parent's nest, fledged, and attained independence.

A mother greater spotted eagle can be a somewhat tight sitter, but when disturbed by activity can abandon the nest for a full day before returning. By late July to early August, the young are fully feathered, and within five days thereafter take their first flight. Fledging occurs at 60–67 days, averaging close to 62 days. In the Altai-Sayan region, the mean number of fledglings per successful nest could vary from an average of 1 per nest in Tuva to 1.8 in Khakassia. In Kazakh studies, an average of 1.38 fledglings were produced in 11 nests. In Western Siberia, an average of 1.44 fledglings were produced in 66 broods.

Dependence on the parents lasts 30 days more after fledging. Before dispersing, young greater spotted eagles may wander locally into the open steppe. Female greater spotted eagles were found to leave 2–3 days before their young in a study in Poland. Meanwhile, the male tends to leave last, at about 1 week after the female. In the Polish study, adults headed straight for Bosphorus while juveniles were sometimes less direct. Most were gone from Poland by the end of September. Juveniles were seen to wander elsewhere in Poland during autumn before finally migrating.

=== Hybridization ===
At one time, greater and lesser spotted eagles may have been largely isolated from each other via different (though potentially proximal) habitats. Climate changes at the conclusion of the last ice age (at some point early in the Holocene) permitted forest growth where there were once grassy boundaries, allowing the two species of spotted eagles to expand into each other's ranges. Hybridization is now known to occur extensively. Hybrids occurs in the entire overlapping range of the two species, which is some 600,000 km^{2} (230,000 sq mi). Interbreeding is mostly determined via conjecture in European Russia, which is roughly the eastern limit of the lesser spotted eagle's range and thus where hybridization possibly occurred most recently.

Hybrids between the two species often show a nape patch (absent in pure greater spotted eagles), an intermediate amount of spotting about the wings, and typically a larger body size than pure lesser spotted eagles. Despite their intermediate characteristics and larger size than lesser spotteds, the hybridization of the species is thought to be an indication of the abandonment of greater spotted eagle territories and the replacement of them by the more adaptive and populous lesser spotted eagles, as was indicated in an Estonian study. The Estonian study found that the number of pairs of hybrids in the nation was twice that of pure greater spotted eagles. The situation was even graver in Lithuania, where not a single pure pair of greater spotted eagles could be found any longer by the mid-2000s, with only 2.7% of 161 breeding spotted eagles being greater spotteds, the rest being lesser spotteds. Lesser spotted eagles were estimated to number around 1,000 breeding pairs in Lithuania, with an estimated 37 or so of these containing one mate that was a greater spotted eagle.

Both Polish and Estonian studies reflected a probable high turnover of mates in hybrid pairs, with the Polish data finding about 71% of the males of the pairs being supplemented in subsequent years. Furthermore, the Polish data indicated that the hybrids favoured the habitats of lesser spotted eagles, farther away from the wetter habitats of the greater spotted eagle and often nearer human development, with a local 50% reduction of pure greater spotted eagle pairs and 30% increase in hybrid pairs.

Habitat alterations to the environment by humans are thought in general to be partially beneficial to lesser spotted eagles and normally harmful to greater spotted eagles.

== Status and conservation ==
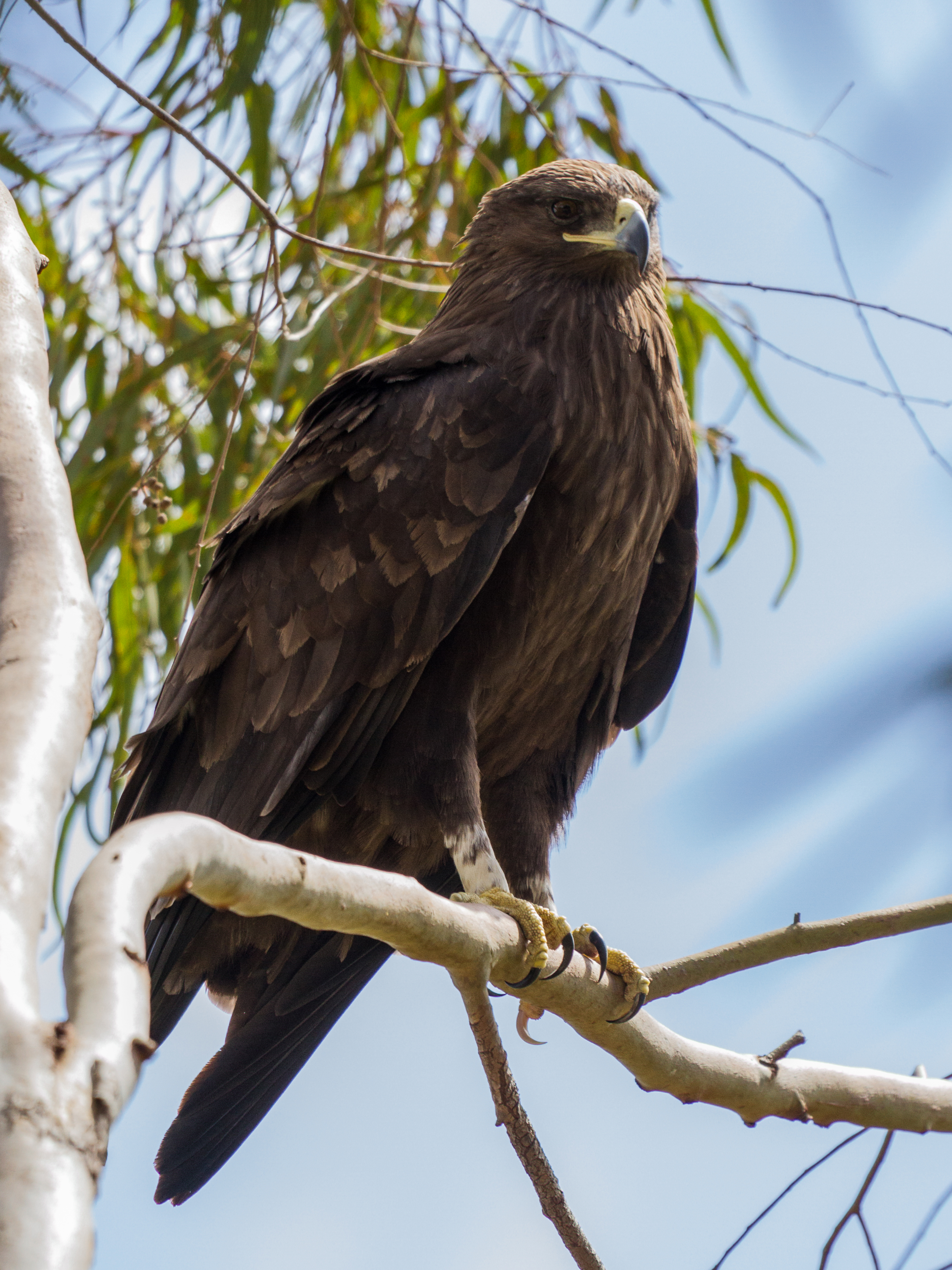
Wintering greater spotted eagle in Israel

Despite maintaining a fairly vast breeding range—covering at least 9 million square kilometres in a band from the Baltic Sea in Europe eastward to the Pacific Ocean with minor outposts in the Indian subcontinent—this eagle occurs at extremely low densities. In essentially every nation of its distribution, the greater spotted eagle is classified as vulnerable to extinction by the IUCN.

Populations and trends of the species have been considered rather poorly studied in the past, but a strong declining trend has been detected. Rough estimates in the 1990s indicated 11 pairs in a huge area of around 2,000 km^{2} (770 sq mi) in northeastern Poland, and only 20–30 pairs in an area of 85,000 km^{2} (33,000 sq mi) in European Russia, with no more than 900 pairs west of the Urals. More refined subsequent efforts put the number of breeding pairs in the European Union at 810–1,100 breeding pairs.

Furthermore, in the 1990s, it was extrapolated from Indian wintering populations that the more eastern population is surely less than four figures. Birdlife International in the 1990s estimated the Russian population at 2,800–3,000 pairs. More recently, Birdlife has estimated the global population as no more than 3,800–13,200 total mature individuals worldwide.

A color-banding recovery study determined that of 1,370 European banded recoveries of spotted eagles, only 3.6% were greater spotted eagles, while hybrids of lesser and greater spotteds comprised 2.7%, and the remaining were all lesser spotted eagles. Greater spotted eagles are considered extirpated as a breeding species from Hungary, Romania, Bulgaria, Czech Republic (where they may have never consistently bred), and Slovakia, as well as Israel where they last bred in the 1960s. Meanwhile, the Finland breeding population is also likely almost gone.

Steady reduction in Ukraine down to 40–50 pairs by 1985, and a 12–20% overall reduction of the Ukrainian population from the 1920s to 1990s, was estimated. The number of greater spotted eagles in Estonia declined 14% merely from 2004 to 2010, with declines having been detected for some time there. Belarus has as many as 150–200 breeding pairs (with confirmed counts of somewhat over 100) and is considered the most important breeding area known outside of Russia.

Whereas the total numbers in European Russia were once estimated at around 1,000 breeding pairs in the 1960s, there are estimated to be fewer than 700 pairs remaining there. The species' range has shrunk in the Russian Far East, where it was once widely found but is now restricted to below the middle Amur river, along the Ussuri river, and south Primorsky Krai, although anecdotal information suggests that it is still somewhat common in the whole Western Siberian lowlands from the Ural Mountains to the middle Ob River. In Kazakhstan, there are an estimated 74–97 breeding pairs of the species.

Wintering estimates are more scattered and efforts to tabulate numbers in India show they continue to occur quite broadly, but in perhaps slightly lowered and more scattered numbers. In Armenia, it is considered one of the two rarest of the nation's 30 raptor species, along with the eastern imperial eagle. Wintering numbers of greater spotted eagles in the Mediterranean Basin were found to total about 300–400 individuals, with a bit under 34% of these in Israel, just under 32% in Greece, 16% in Turkey, somewhat smaller numbers in Romania and Spain, and tiny numbers in Southeastern Europe, Montenegro, and France. Around 50 individuals winter in Turkey per other sources. The species appears fairly rarely in Ethiopia and Eritrea, where they are seen singly and sparsely in most cases.

=== Threats and conservation efforts ===
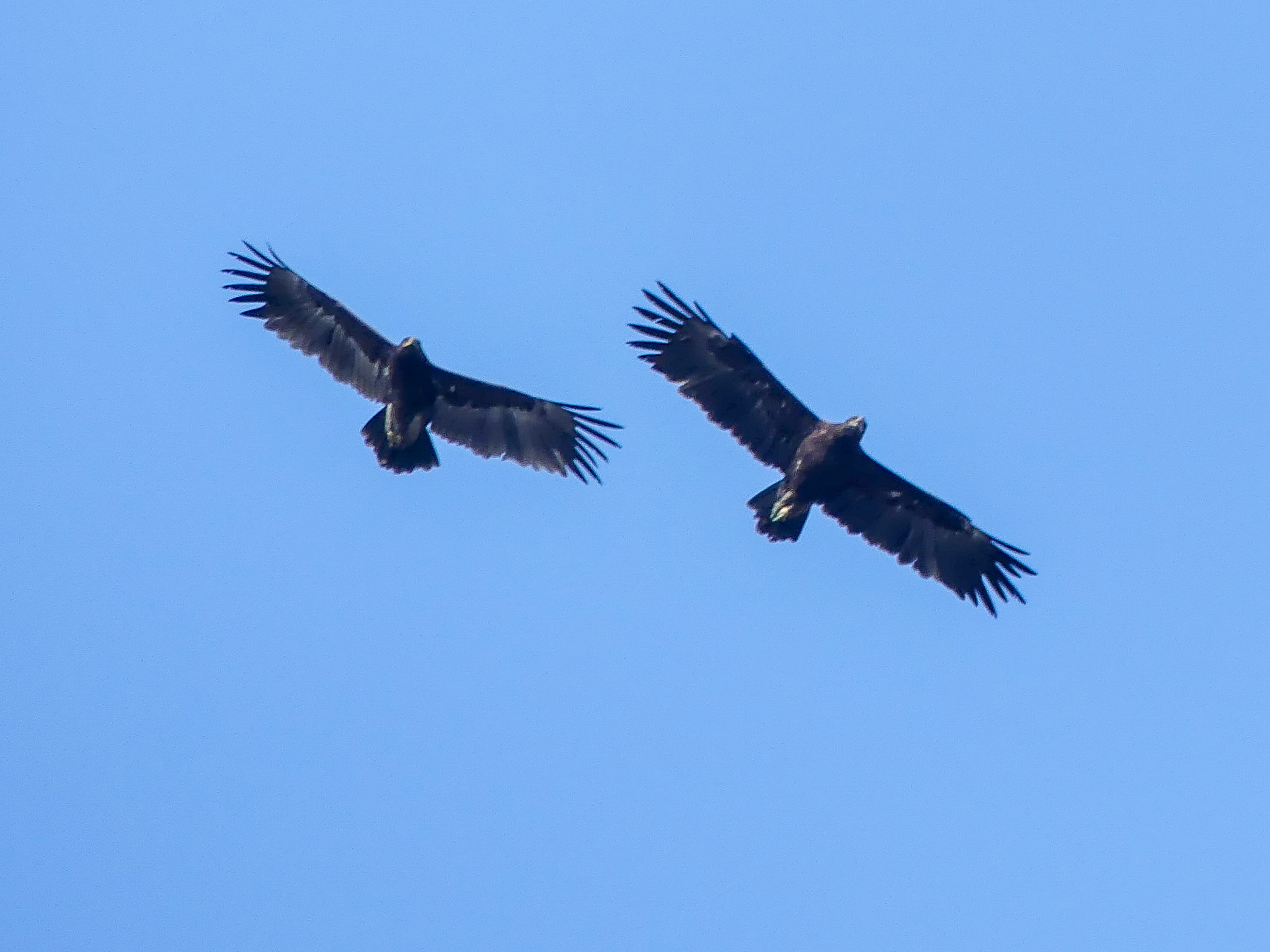
A couple of greater spotted eagles wintering in India

The species' primary threats are habitat degradation and habitat loss. Greater spotted eagles appear to be highly sensitive to habitat alterations, especially drainage of wetlands, intensified agricultural practices, and abandonment of floodplain management practices.

Detrimental wetland management processes have additionally affected the species on their wintering grounds, where in Saudi Arabia at least, the effect has been offset by the species adapting to man-made bodies of water (unlike in winter, though, there is no evidence that they adapt well to man-made areas during breeding). The amount of usable manmade habitat has shrunk in Thailand with a change to dry season rice field cropping and the creeping presence of urbanization, along with probable rodenticide usage and other poisonings, likely harming the number of the species able to winter there.

Other known threats include human disturbance during the mating season, with forestry operations now known to be a major cause of disturbance at the nest site. Furthermore, greater spotted eagles are threatened by mostly inadvertent poisonings and collisions with man-made objects, especially electrical wires. Poisonings were known to be a serious cause of mortality in a Shanxi reserve in China, where the eagles were seen to hunt down sickly or dying common pheasants that had been poisoned and then subsequently dying themselves, this becoming the primary local source of mortality.

In the Malay Peninsula, subsequent to a brief increase of the species from the 1960s to the 1980s due to environmental changes favorable to avian scavengers, a crash in numbers down to almost none was thought to be quite likely due to pesticide and other poison usage. The real trends of greater spotted eagles are sometimes masked by misidentifications.

Furthermore, as aforementioned, the species is at threat of hybridization and ultimate supplantation by the lesser spotted eagle as its range creeps farther east. The greater spotted eagle is legally protected in only scattered nations, making conservation efforts difficult. Among the nations where they are legally protected are Belarus, Estonia, France, Greece, Latvia, Poland, Romania, Russia, and nominally in Thailand. A working group specifically to address spotted eagles has been established as of the 21st century. The working groups have managed to undertake conservation efforts in Belarus, Estonia, and Ukraine—the core breeding areas left in Europe for the species—and have successfully instituted restrictions on forestry activities near nesting sites during the breeding season. Conservation activities have been also led within projects funded by EU LIFE programme. From 2010 to 2014 a project titled "Securing the population of Aquila clanga in Poland: preparation of the National Action Plan and primary site conservation" focused on Polish population. An international project under the title "Above the borders: conservation of Greater Spotted Eagles at breeding and wintering areas, and on its flyway" has been established to improve conditions at the breeding sites and increase the abundance of the greater spotted eagle.

The building of artificial nest platforms did not seem to greatly aid greater spotted eagles in Nizhny Novgorod—unlike other raptors such as the osprey, the white-tailed eagle, and the golden eagle—as only one pair of greater spotted eagles were recorded to use a platform as a nest. In an exceptional positive note, it was found the European population of greater spotted eagle, as studied via microsatellites, retains quite high genetic diversity, meaning that there is no eminent threat of a genetic bottleneck for the species.
