= Meshchera Lowlands =

Geographic region in western Russia

Coordinates: 55°10′58″N 40°20′00″E

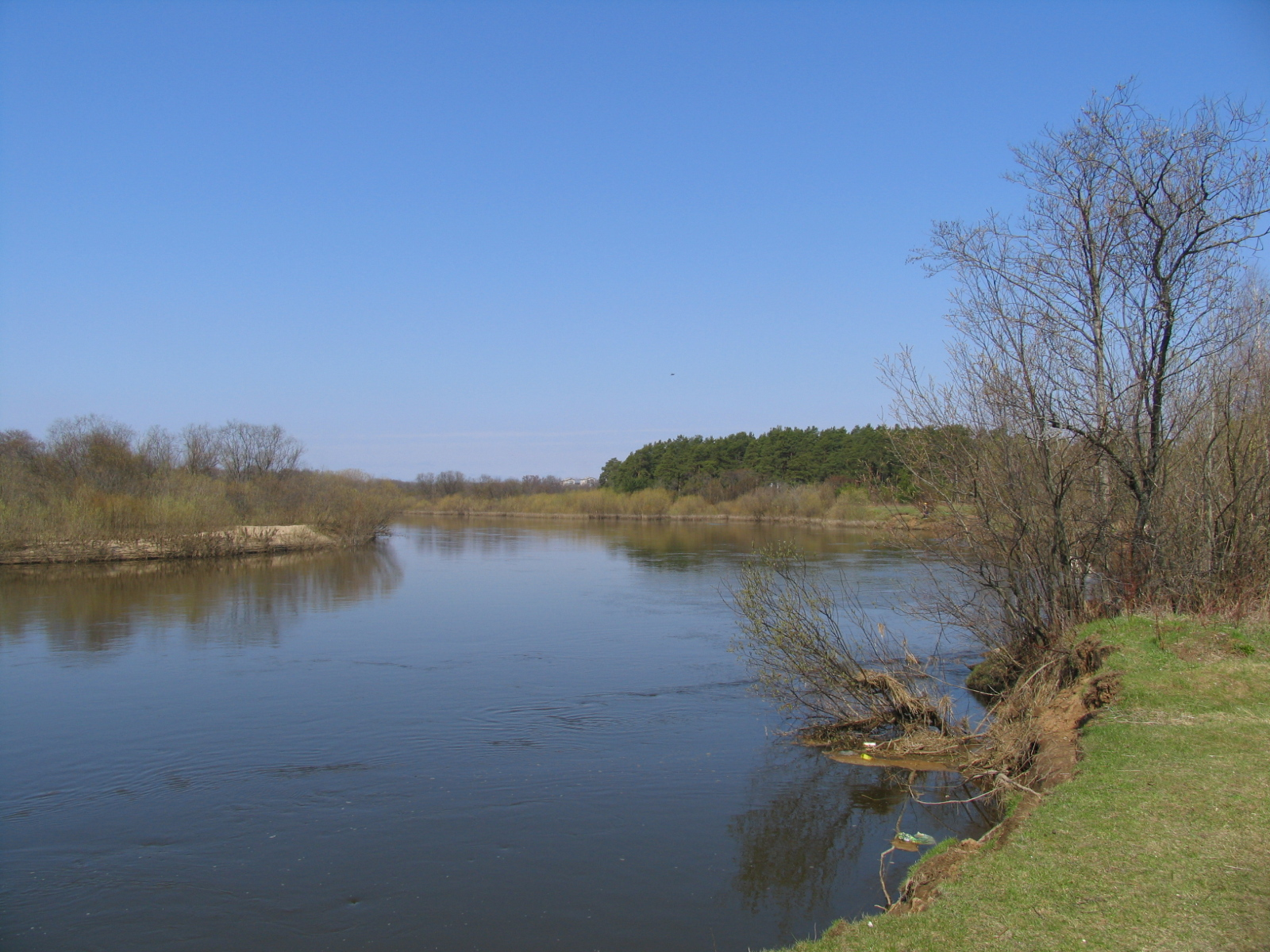
Vladimir Oblast Meshchera

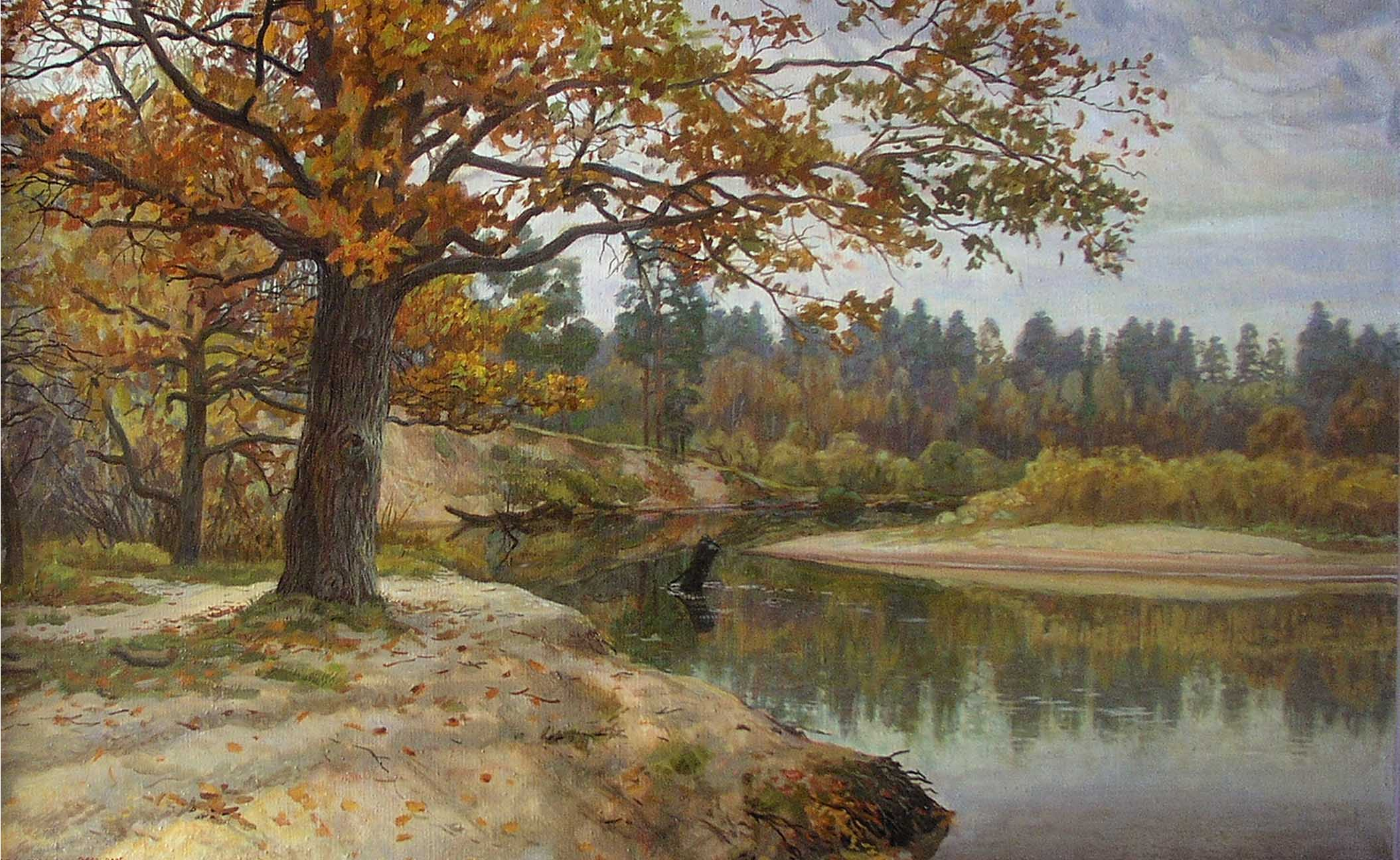
M. Presnyakov. "Autumn in the Meshchera land" (2003–2005)

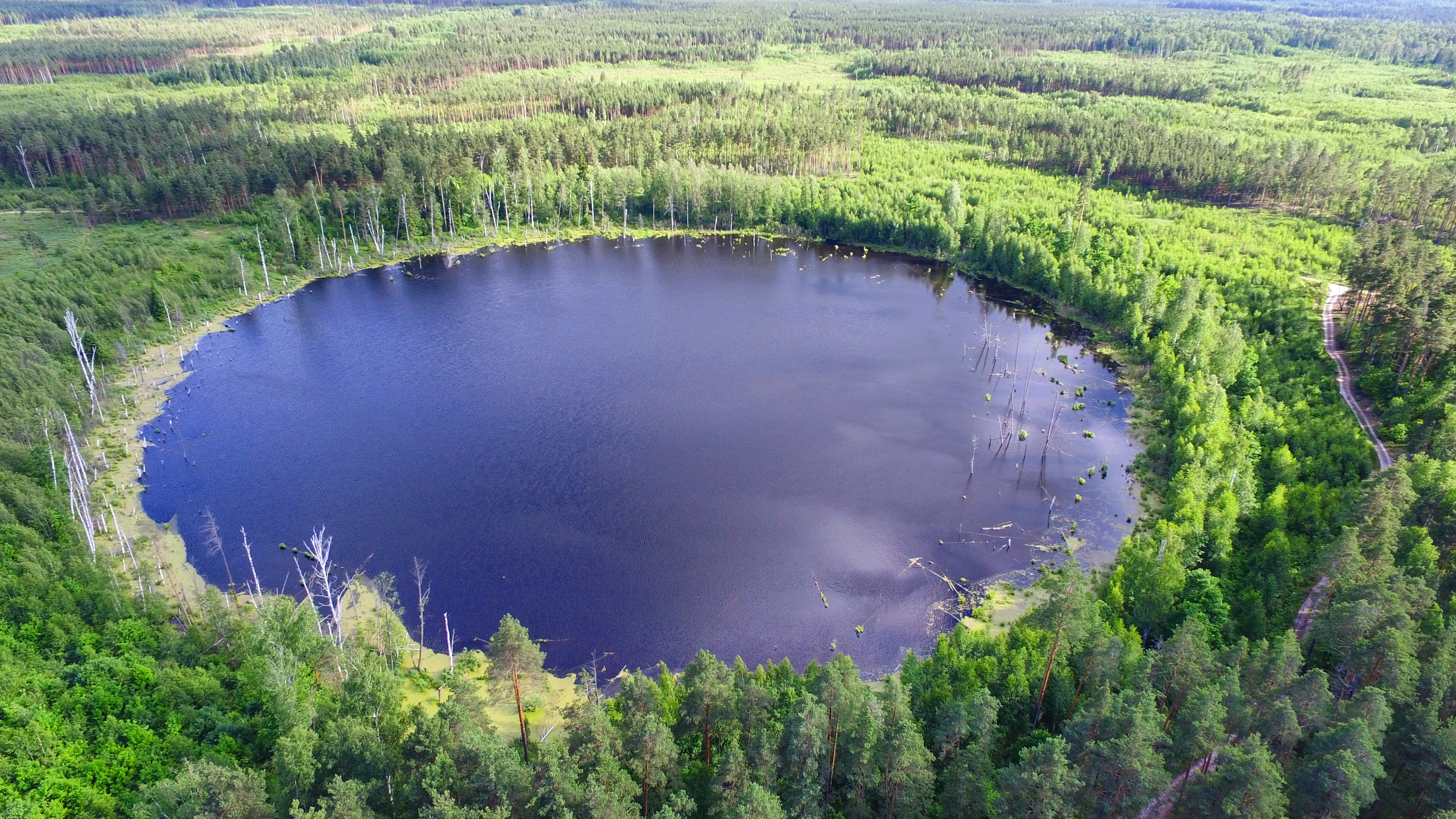
Lake Smerdyachye, Moscow Oblast

Meshchera Lowlands or Meshchyora Lowlands (Russian: Мещёрская низменность, romanized: Meshchyorskaya nizmennost), also referred to as simply Meshchera (Мещера) or Meshchyora (Мещёра), is a spacious lowland in the middle of the European Russia. It is named after the Finnic Meshchera people, which used to live there (later mixing with neighbouring Baltic, Turkic and Slavic tribes). It occupies parts of Moscow Oblast, Vladimir Oblast and Ryazan Oblast, as well as eastern districts of Moscow proper.

== Geography ==
Meshchera is a plain of roughly triangular shape bounded by rivers Oka from the South, Moskva River from the Southwest, Klyazma from the North and Sudogda and Kolp from the East. Elevation: 80–130 metres.

Climate of Meshchera is humid continental with long, cold and snowy winters, and short, warm and rainy summers. Annual average temperature is +4.3 °C (39.7 °F). The coldest month is February with average temperature of −11.6 °C (11.1 °F). During severe winters, temperatures can go as low as −47 °C (−53 °F). Summers are warm, sometimes hot, with average July temperature of +19.8 °C (67.6 °F), and in extremely hot summers temperature can rise up to +40 °C (104 °F).

It is covered by mixed forests, pine forests in sandy areas, with many wetlands and lakes.

The area includes the Meshchyora National Park and the Oka Nature Reserve.
