= Oka Nature Reserve =

Strict nature reserve in Ryazan Oblast, Russia

- Russian: Окский заповедник (Also: Oksky)
- IUCN category Ia (strict nature reserve)
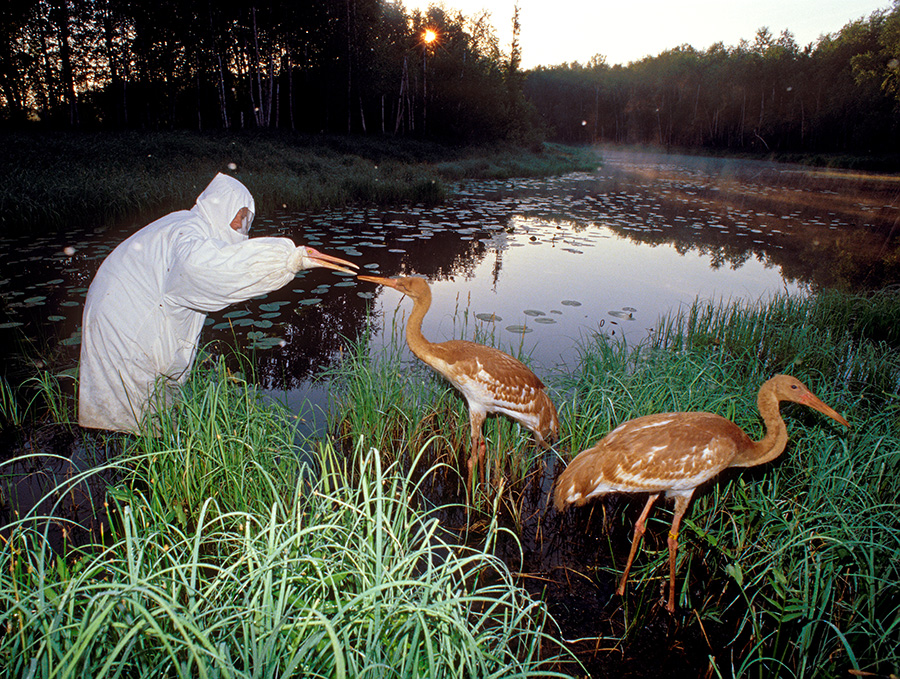
- Juvenile Siberian cranes in Oka Nature Reserve

- Location within Russia
- Location: Ryazan Oblast
- Nearest city: Ryazan
- Coordinates: 54°45′0″N 40°45′0″E
- Area: 55,722 hectares (137,692 acres; 215 sq mi)
- Established: 1935
- Governing body: Ministry of Natural Resources and Environment
- Website: http://oksky-reserve.ru/

Oka Nature Reserve (Russian: Окский заповедник) (also Oksky, or Okskiy) is a Russian 'zapovednik' (strict nature reserve) located in the Meshchera Lowlands, the floodplain of the Oka River and the Pra River. With extensive lowland rivers and forested peatlands, the reserve is an important area for waterfowl and waders. The reserve hosts breeding centers for bison and for crane. The site is situated in the Spassky District, Ryazan Oblast, about 60 km northeast of the city of Ryazan. In 1994, the "Flood plains of Rivers Pra and Oka" was designated a Ramsar wetland of international importance. The site was designated a UNESCO Man and Biosphere (MAB) reserve in 1978. The reserve was formally established in 1935, and covers an area of 55,722 ha (215.14 sq mi).

== Topography ==
The Oka Reserve has a terrain that is mostly forested peatlands (about 90%), swamps (5%), and dryland (5%). The floodplains are along the Pra, which is a tributary of the Oka. The Oka area feature more meadows, with forest islands. Aside from the Oka and Pra rivers, the reserve also includes the Lamsha River and Black River. The altitude ranges from 80 to 200 meters. The buffer zone around the boundaries is used for low-impact agriculture such as haymaking.

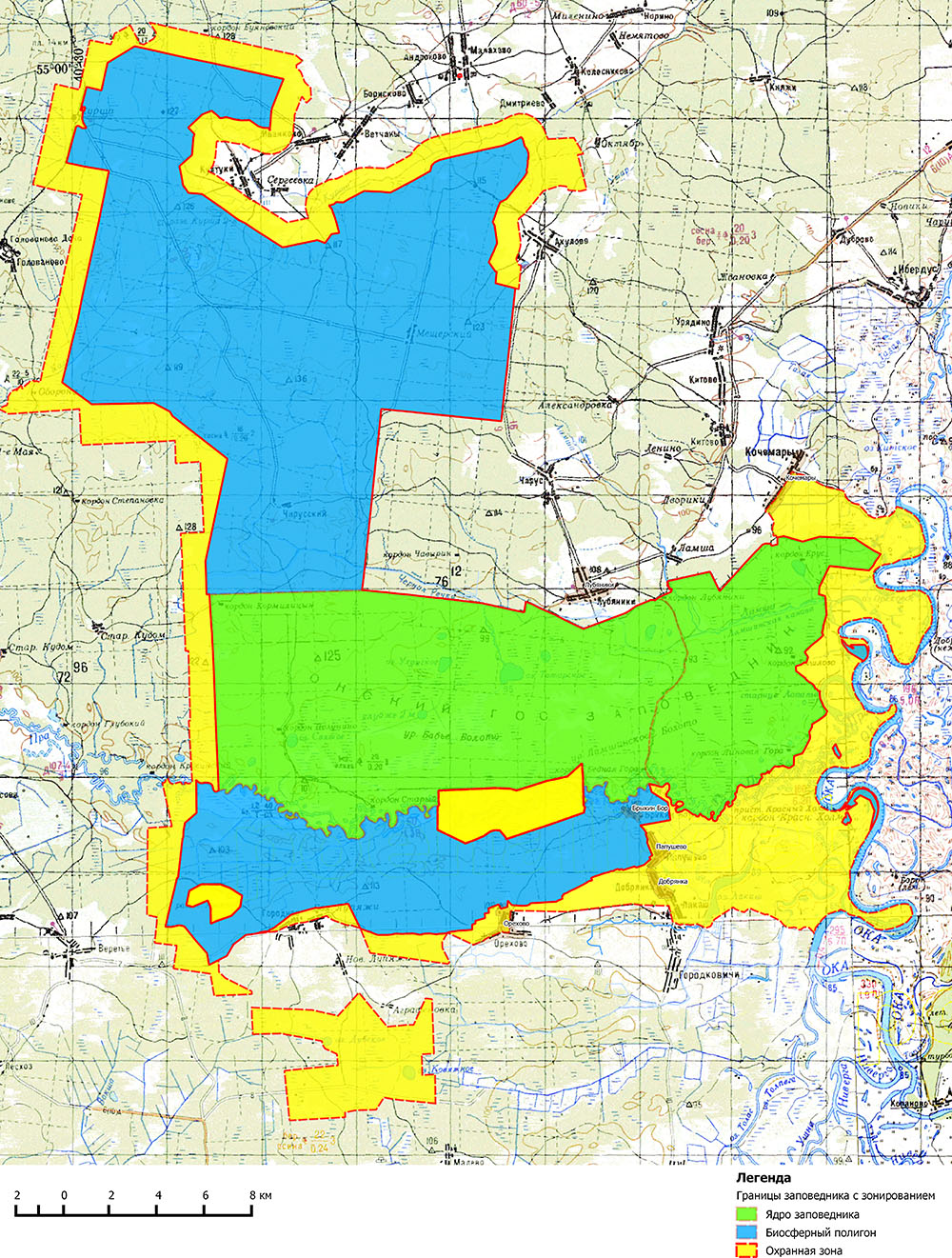
Map of Oka Reserve (green and blue) with buffer zones

== Climate and ecoregion ==
The reserve is in the Sarmatic mixed forests ecoregion, a band of mixed oak/spruce/pine forests stretching from southern Sweden to the Ural Mountains.

The climate of Oka is humid continental climate, warm summer (Köppen climate classification (Dfb)). This climate is characterized by large swings in temperature, both diurnally and seasonally, with mild summers and cold, snowy winters. The average temperature in the Oka reserve ranges from 11.6 °C (52.9 °F) in February, to and average of 19.8 °C (67.6 °F) in July. Precipitation is highly variable - averaging from 347 mm/year to 918 mm/year. Prevailing winds are from the west and southwest.

== Flora and fauna ==
Oka has different forest types across its territory: pine forests (Pinus sylvestris) with birch (Betula sp.), oak (Quercus robur) and alder (Alnus glutinosa), oak with lime and maple undergrowth, and spruce forests. There are sphagnum bogs and flood-plain meadows. Scientists on the reserve have recorded over 880 species of vascular plants in 109 families.

The animal life of the reserve is typical of the central European forests. The most common mammals are voles (60% of the rodents), field mice and forest mice. Predators include foxes, wolves, and badgers. Hoofed animals include roe deer, elk, and wild boar. Scientists on the reserve have recorded 61 species of mammals, 266 of birds, 11 of amphibians, 6 of reptiles, 39 of fish, and 3883 species of invertebrates.

The reserve hosts a European Bison Breeding Center, established in 1959, and a Crane Breeding Center that was founded in 1979.

== Ecoeducation and access ==
As a strict nature reserve, the Oka Reserve is mostly closed to the general public, although scientists and those with 'environmental education' purposes can make arrangements with park management for visits. Tourists are welcome in Birkin forest buffer area. There are also a number of 'ecotourist' routes open to the public; these require permits to be obtained in advance. The local office is in the village of Brykin Bor.

== See also ==
- List of Russian Nature Reserves (class 1a 'zapovedniks')
- National parks of Russia
