= Spas-Klepiki =

Town in Ryazan Oblast, Russia

Spas-Klepiki Спас-Клепики
- Town
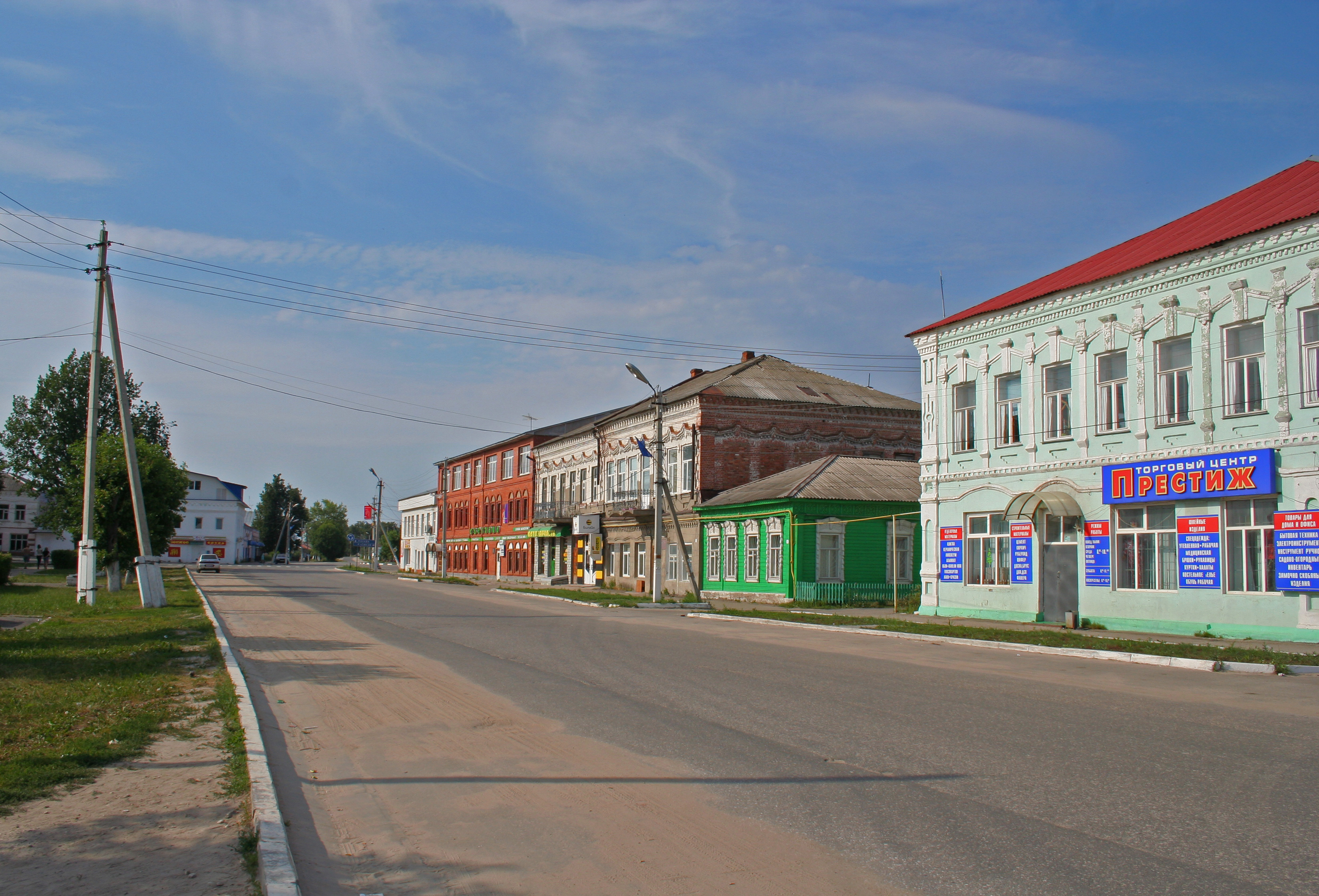
- A street in Spas-Klepiki

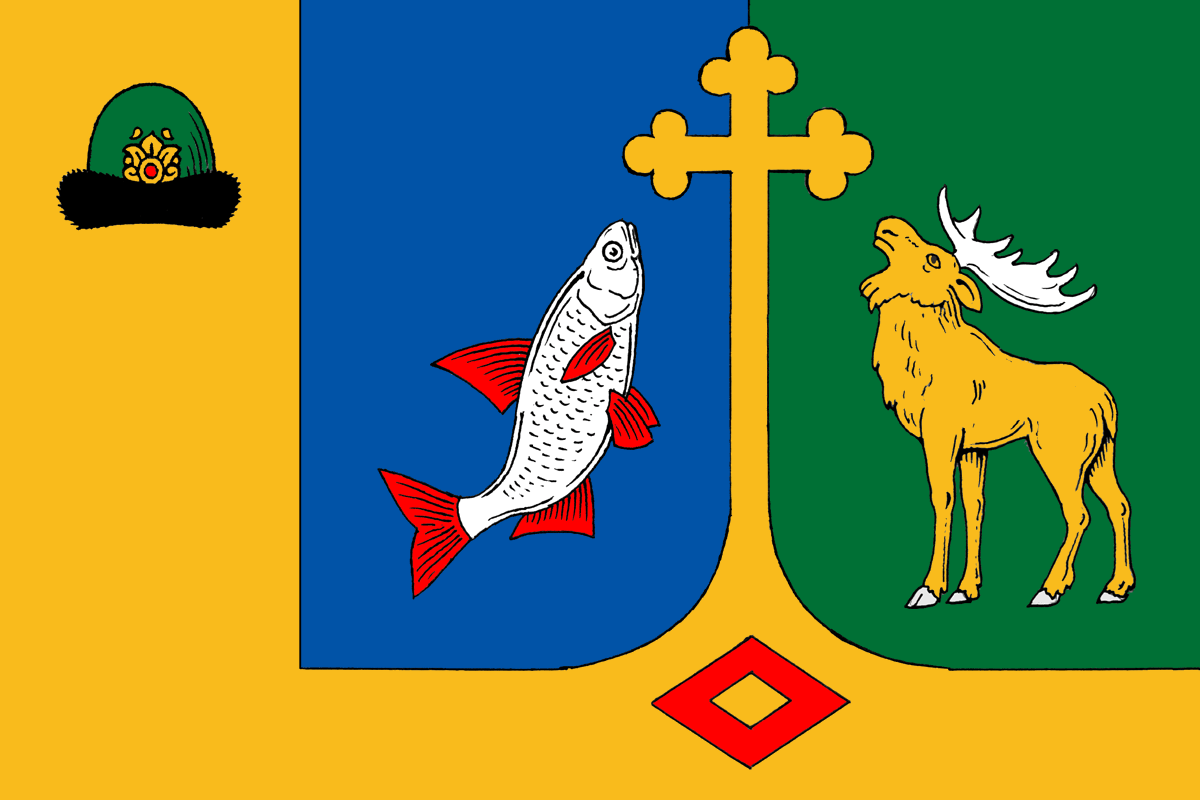
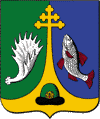
- Flag Coat of arms
- Interactive map of Spas-Klepiki
- Location of Spas-Klepiki Spas-Klepiki (Ryazan Oblast)
- Coordinates: 55°08′N 40°11′E
- Country: Russia
- Federal subject: Ryazan Oblast
- Administrative district: Klepikovsky District
- Town of district significanceSelsoviet: Spas-Klepiki
- Founded: 16th century
- Town status since: 1920
- Elevation: 110 m (360 ft)

Population (2010 Census)
  - Total: 5,916
  - Estimate (2023): 4,591 (−22.4%)

Administrative status
  - Capital of: Klepikovsky District, town of district significance of Spas-Klepiki

Municipal status
  - Municipal district: Klepikovsky Municipal District
  - Urban settlement: Spas-Klepikovskoye Urban Settlement
  - Capital of: Klepikovsky Municipal District, Spas-Klepikovskoye Urban Settlement
- Time zone: UTC+3 (MSK)
- Postal codes: 391030, 391049
- OKTMO ID: 61610101001

Spas-Klepiki (Russian: Спас-Кле́пики) is a town and the administrative center of Klepikovsky District in Ryazan Oblast, Russia, located on the Pra River (Oka's tributary) 67 kilometers (42 mi) northeast of Ryazan, the administrative center of the oblast. Population: 5,916 (2010 census); 6,153 (2002 census); 7,209 (1989 Soviet census).

== History ==
It was founded in the 16th century as a settlement of Klepiki (Кле́пики) and granted town status in 1920.

== Administrative and municipal status ==
Within the framework of administrative divisions, Spas-Klepiki serves as the administrative center of Klepikovsky District. As an administrative division, it is, together with eight rural localities, incorporated within Klepikovsky District as the town of district significance of Spas-Klepiki. As a municipal division, the town of district significance of Spas-Klepiki is incorporated within Klepikovsky Municipal District as Spas-Klepikovskoye Urban Settlement.
