= Klepikovsky District =

Klepikovsky District Клепиковский район (Russian)
- District
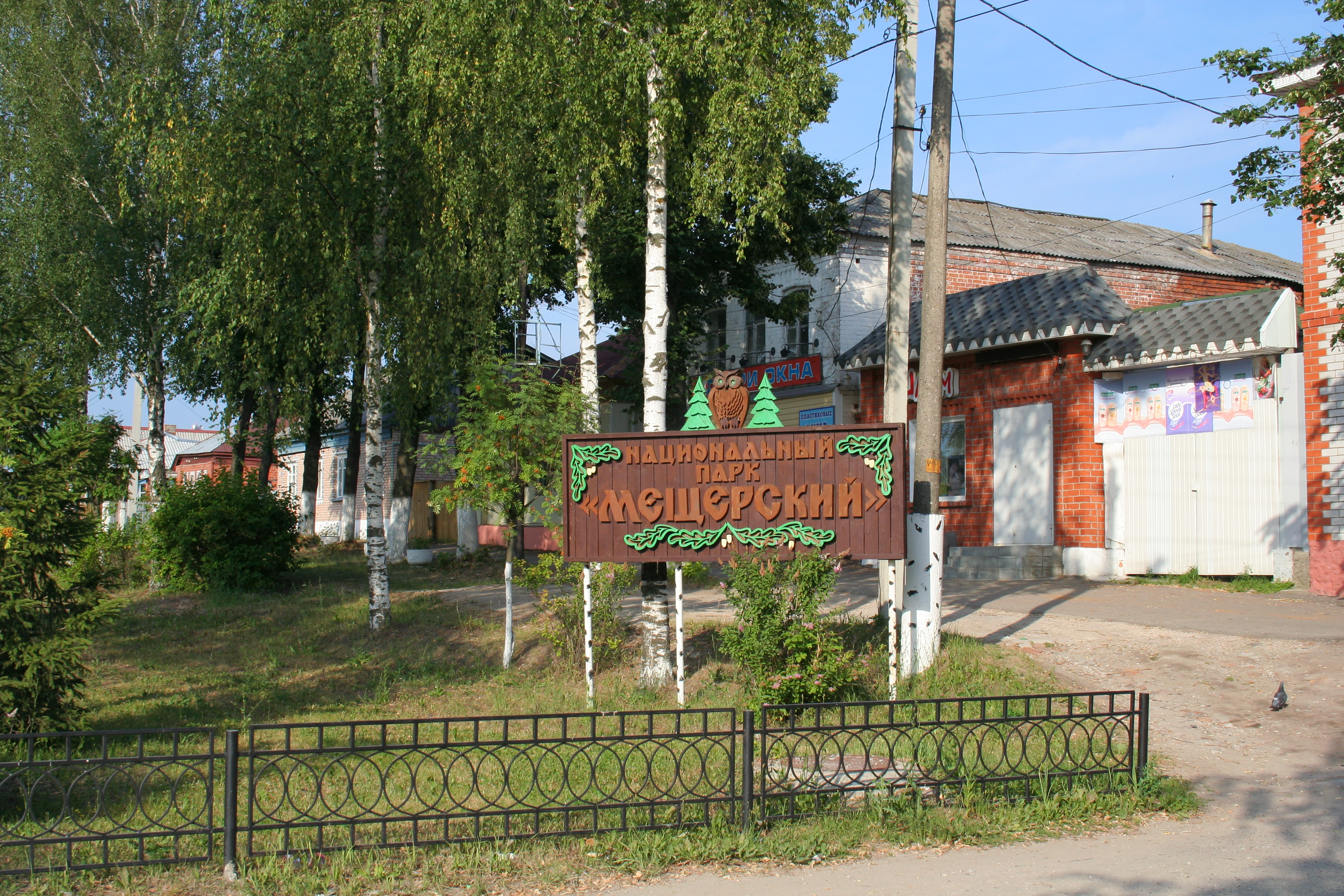
- Entrance to Meshchyora National Park in Klepikovsky District

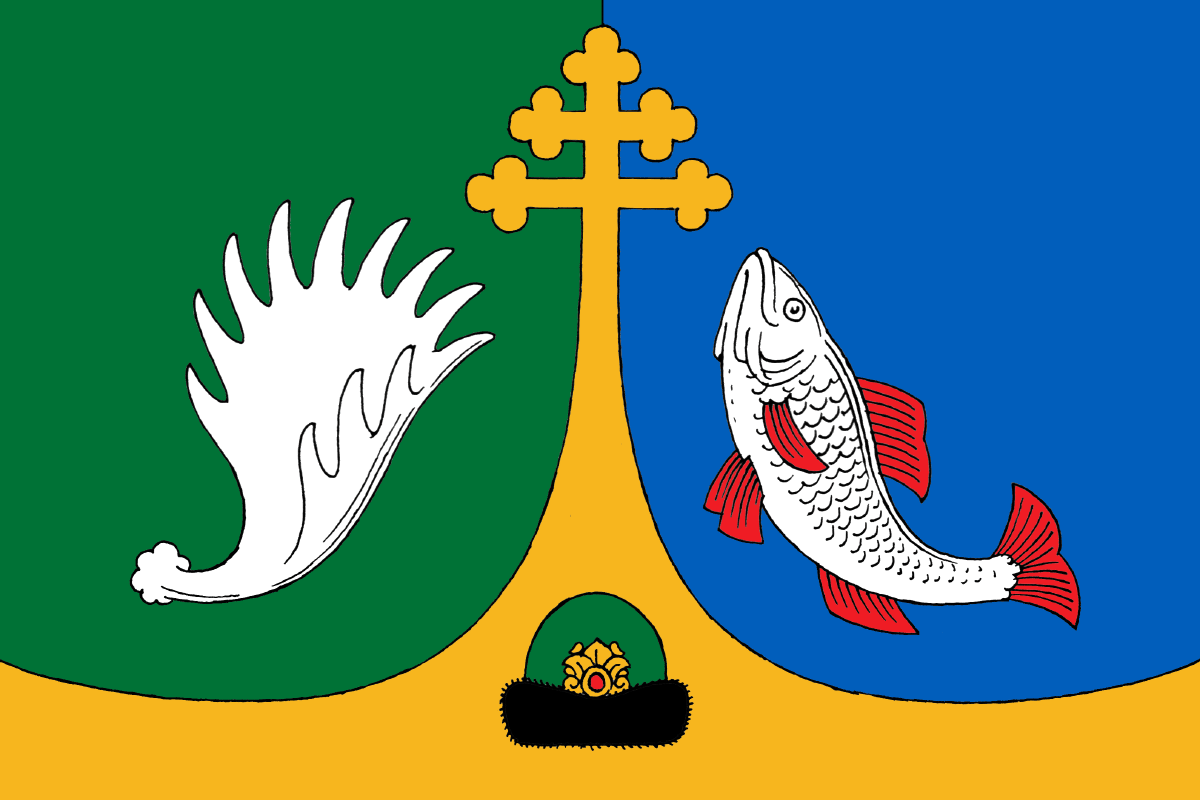
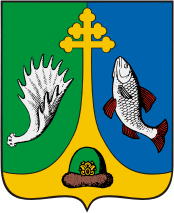
- Flag Coat of arms
- Location of Klepikovsky District in Ryazan Oblast
- Coordinates: 55°08′N 40°10′E
- Country: Russia
- Federal subject: Ryazan Oblast
- Established: 12 July 1929
- Administrative center: Spas-Klepiki

Area
  - Total: 3,235 km^{2} (1,249 sq mi)

Population (2010 Census)
  - Total: 25,476
  - Density: 7.875/km^{2} (20.40/sq mi)
  - Urban: 47.4%
  - Rural: 52.6%

Administrative structure
  - Administrative divisions: 1 Towns of district significance, 1 Work settlements, 23 Rural okrugs
  - Inhabited localities: 1 cities/towns, 1 urban-type settlements, 273 rural localities

Municipal structure
  - Municipally incorporated as: Klepikovsky Municipal District
  - Municipal divisions: 2 urban settlements, 13 rural settlements
- Time zone: UTC+3 (MSK)
- OKTMO ID: 61610000
- Website: http://xn--80adimbgbbcbg7aggfxn.xn--p1ai/

Klepikovsky District (Russian: Клепико́вский райо́н) is an administrative and municipal district (raion), one of the twenty-five in Ryazan Oblast, Russia. It is located in the north of the oblast. The area of the district is 3,235 square kilometers (1,249 sq mi). Its administrative center is the town of Spas-Klepiki. Population: 25,476 (2010 Census); 29,391 (2002 census); 34,766 (1989 Soviet census). The population of Spas-Klepiki accounts for 23.2% of the district's total population.

== Economy and transportation ==
The Mesherskoye peat narrow gauge railway serves a peat factory which became operational in 2013.

== Notable residents ==
- Abram Arkhipov (1862–1930), realist artist, born in the village of Yegorovo
