= Meshchyora National Park =

National park in Russia

- Мещёра, Meshchera, Meshchora
- IUCN category II (national park)
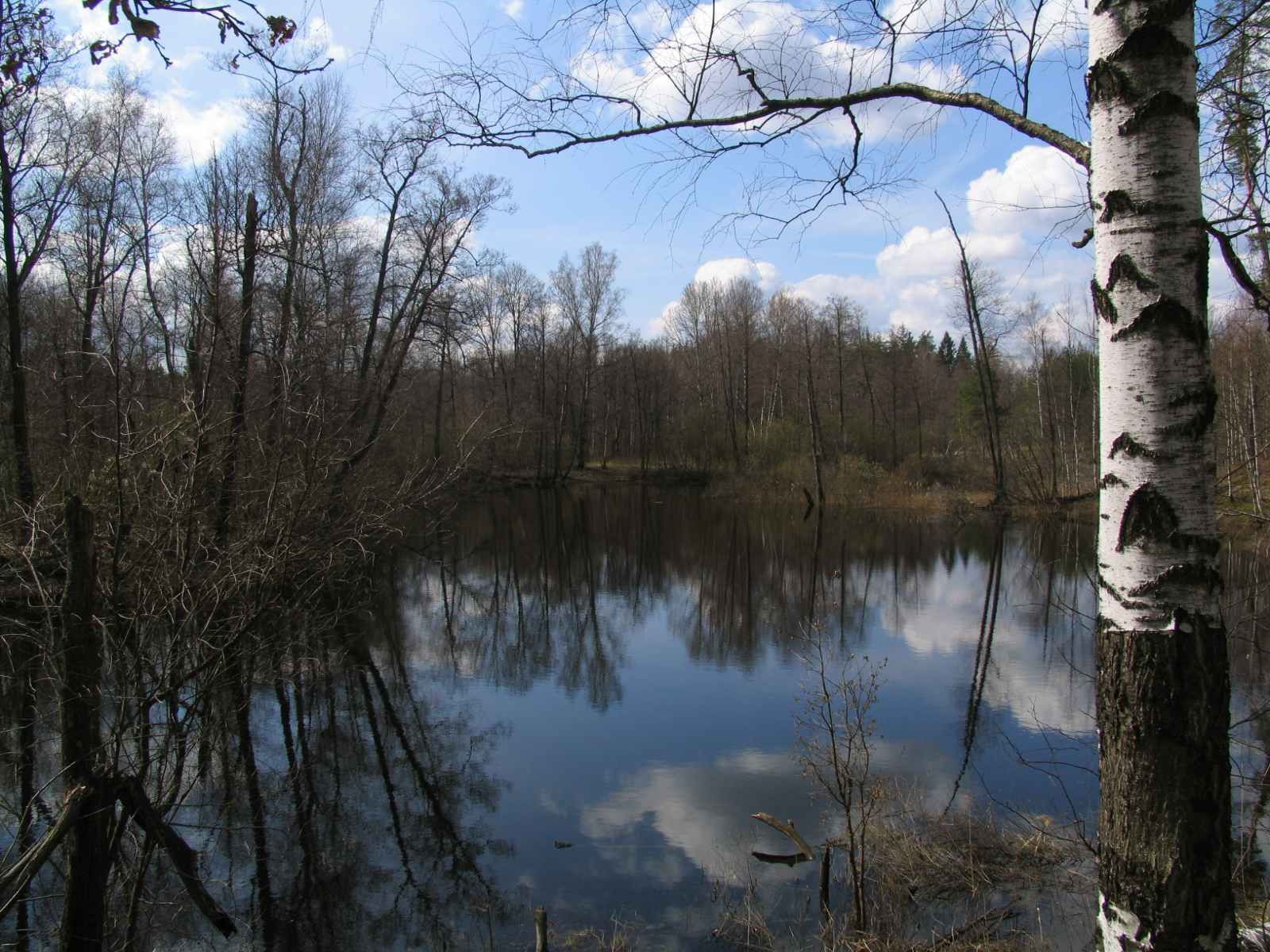
- Meshchyora National Park

- Location within Russia
- Location: Vladimir Oblast
- Nearest city: Vladimir
- Coordinates: 55°34′N 40°15′E
- Area: 118,900 hectares (293,808 acres; 1,189 km^{2}; 459 sq mi)
- Established: April 9, 1992
- Governing body: FGBU "Meshchyora"
- Website: http://www.park-meshera.ru/

Meshchyora National Park (Russian: Мещёра (национальный парк)) covers extensive wetlands (swamps, peat bogs, rivers and lakes) and pine/birch woodlands in the Meshchera Lowlands on the East European Plain in Vladimir Oblast, about 120 km east of Moscow. The wetland habitat provides for extremely rich biodiversity among the plants and animals. The area is associated with the medieval Meshchera tribe, from which the area takes its name. "Meshchyora" National Park (Мещёра) is not to be confused with "Meshchersky" (Мещёрский) National Park, which is just to the south, over the border in Ryazan Oblast. The Meshchyora NP is located entirely within the Oka River watershed. A small corner of the park touches on the border of the Moscow region. About 39% of the park territory is used and managed for agricultural purposes by local communities.

== Topography ==
Meshchyora is located in a flat, ancient alluvial valley formed during the Quaternary Period as the Oka and Dnieper glaciers (and the Moscow glacier on the northwest edge of the park), receded and left a glaciofluvial cover. Today, the main rivers - the Buzha river and the Pol river - flow into the Oka in slow, meandering floodplains. The altitude of land in the park ranges only 35 meters vertically - from 115 meters above sea level to 150 meters. The highest points are on moraines left by the glaciers. The wetlands experience floods in the spring, and low-water levels and dryness during the summer dry season.

Approximately 70% of the territory is wetland, of which about 24,000 hectares are peatland. Of the peatland, about 12,000 hectares represent drained peatland where peat extraction has occurred. This area is particularly vulnerable to wildfires.

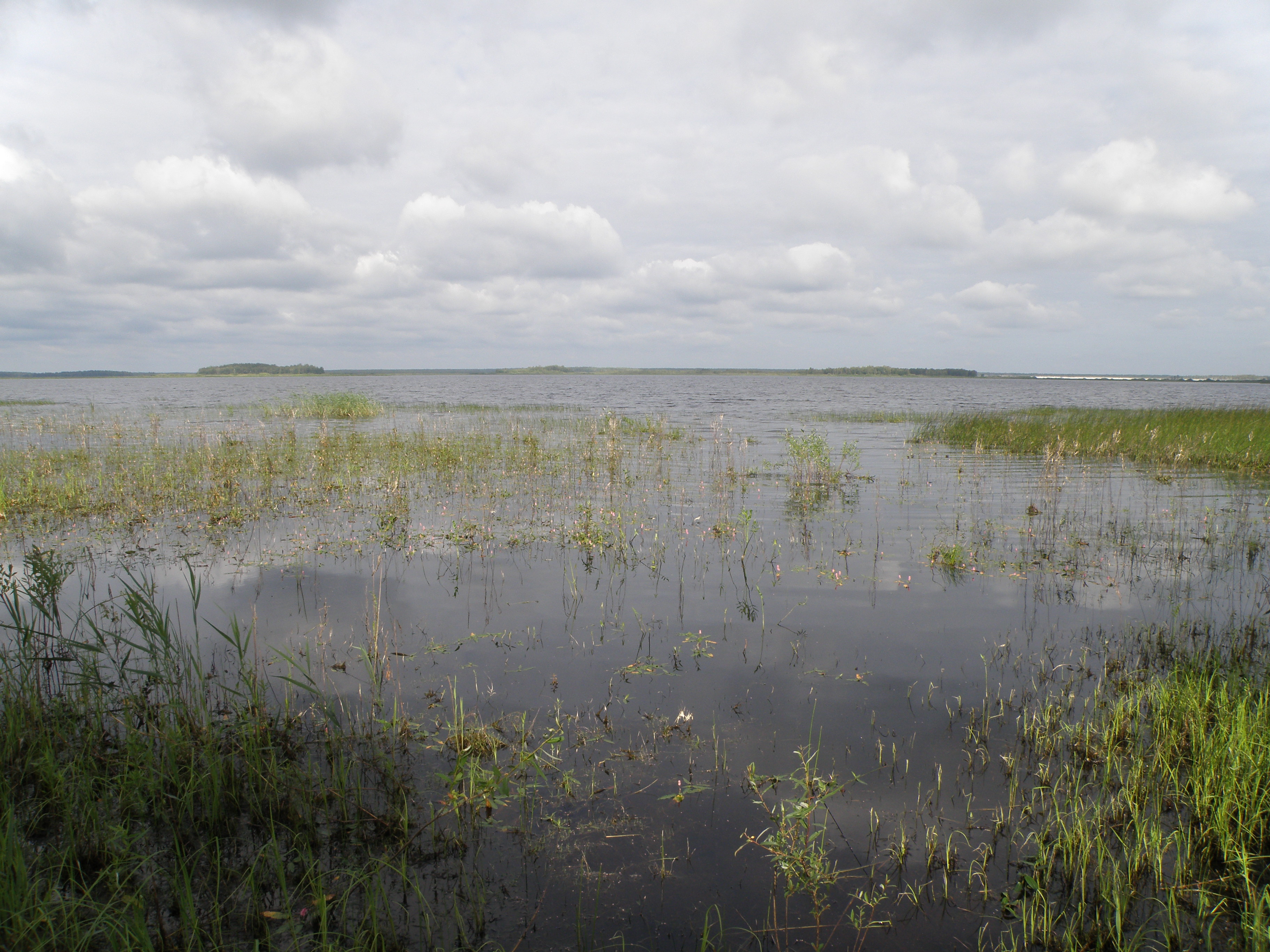
Holy Lake, view from the east coast

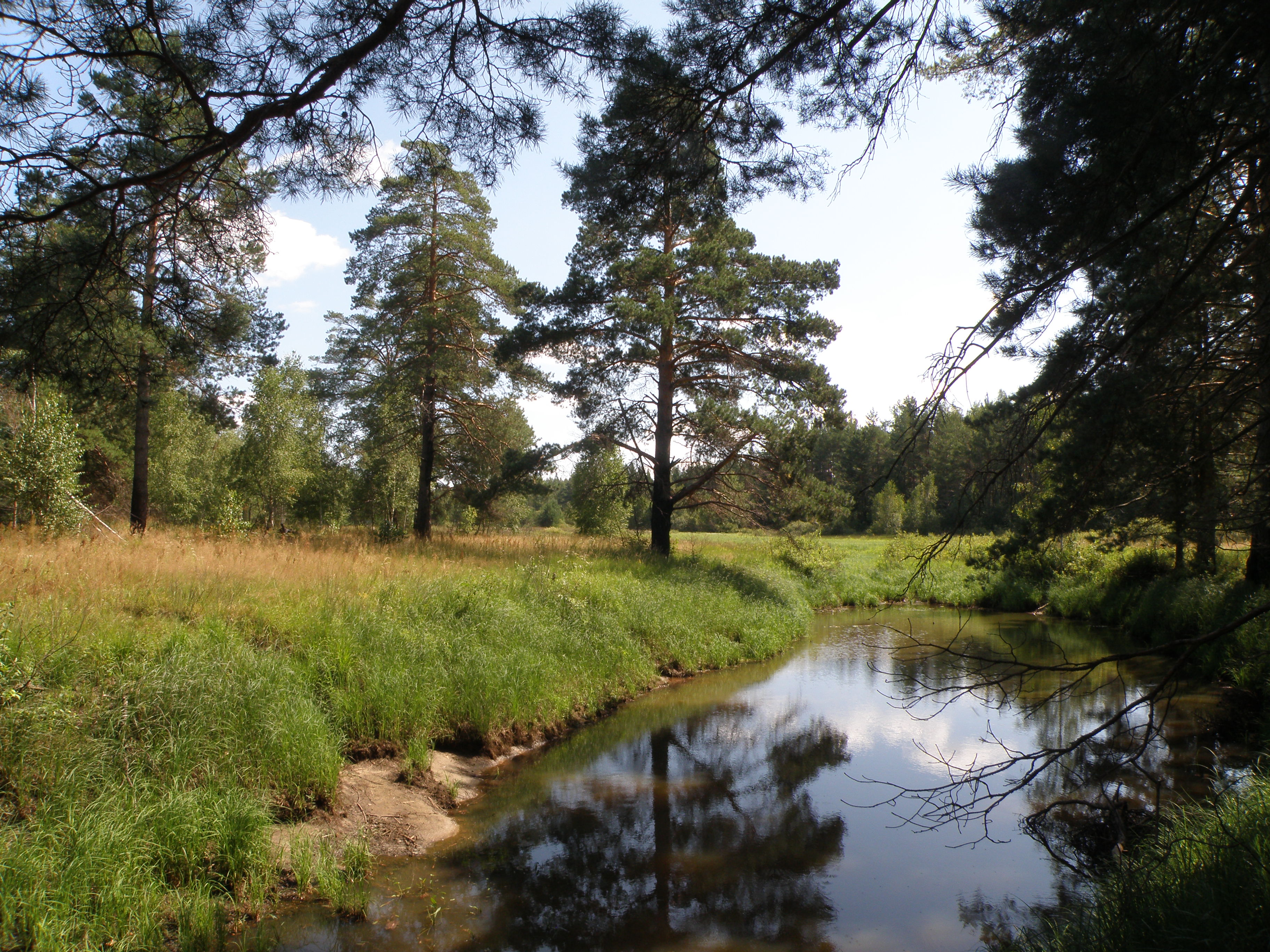
Buzha River

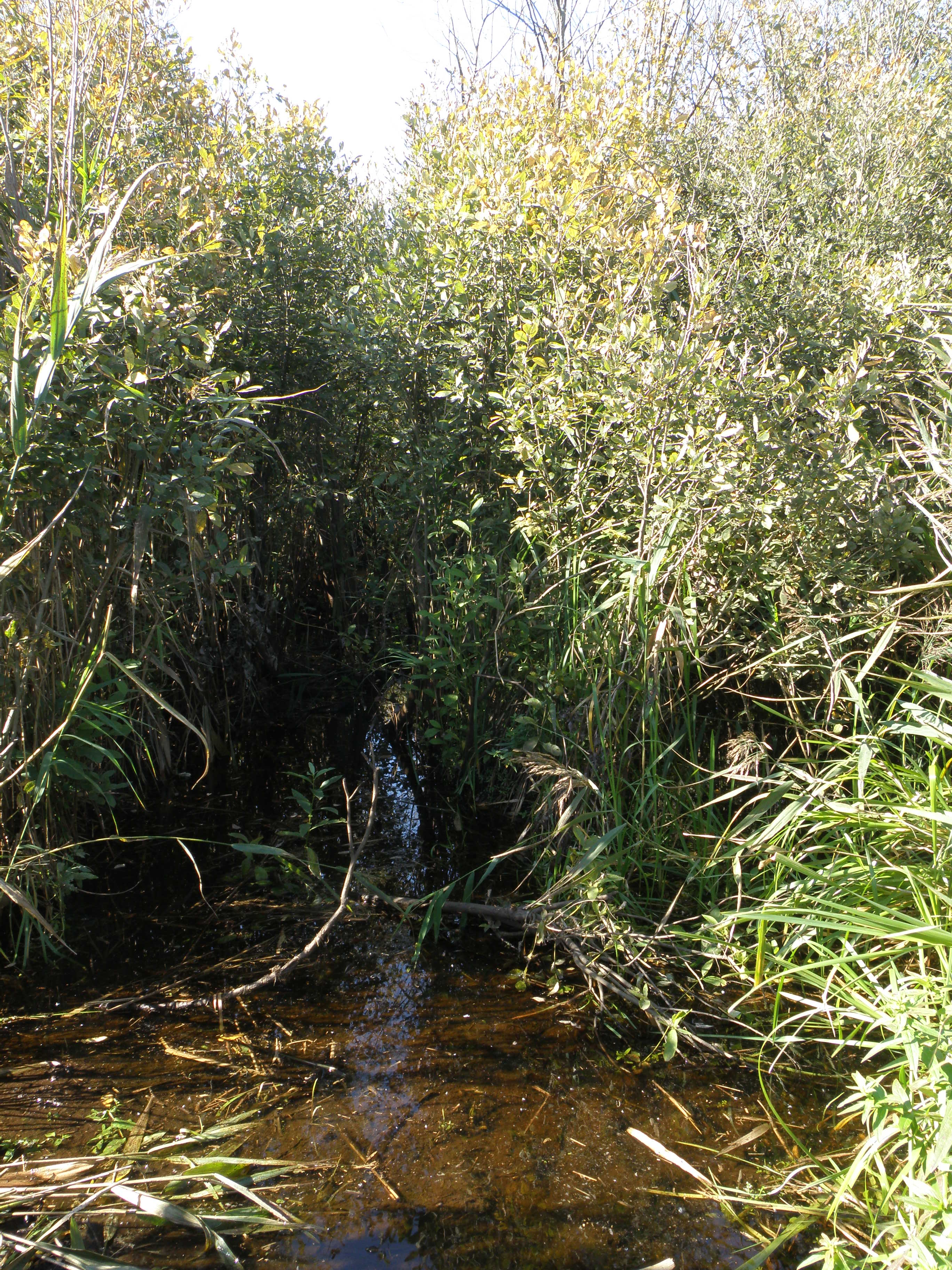
Flow in the Pol River

== Ecoregion and climate ==
The park is in the Sarmatic mixed forests ecoregion, a band of temperate mixed forests that stretches from Norway to the Ural Mountains. The climate of Meshchera is moderate continental (Köppen climate classification Dfb), characterized by four distinct seasons, high variance between winter and summer temperatures, long winters, and short, warm and rainy summers. Average temperatures range from 13 F in January to 74 F in July. Annual precipitation averages 16 inches.

Vladimir, Vladimir Oblast, Russia

Climate chart (precipitation, max. and min. temperature)
J	F	M	A	M	J	J	A	S	O	N	D
1.3 23 13	0.8 23 12	0.8 35 22	1.1 51 35	1.1 63 44	2.2 70 53	1.7 74 57	2.2 70 53	1.3 59 44	1.9 46 34	1.4 31 24	1.2 24 15
- █ Average max. and min. temperatures in °F
- █ Precipitation totals in inches
- Source: worldweatheronline.com
Metric conversion
J	F	M	A	M	J	J	A	S	O	N	D
33 −5 −11	20 −5 −11	20 2 −6	28 11 2	28 17 7	56 21 12	43 23 14	56 21 12	33 15 7	48 8 1	36 −1 −4	30 −4 −9
- █ Average max. and min. temperatures in °C
- █ Precipitation totals in mm

== Plants ==
Meshchera is a mix of excessively wet and dry habitats. Pine trees tend to be found on the drier, sandy hills and ridges. Due to past logging and fires, stands of pine over 100 years old are only found in fragments. A few small areas of broadleaf forest (mostly oak) is found in the southeast corner. The remainder of the forested areas are small-leafed - birch, maple, and alder. The non-forested areas tend towards meadow, floodplain, and marsh species. Park management notes that while one quarter of the territory was bog-land before economic development, most of that has since been drained to drier levels. Over the remaining peat are meadows with moss overgrown by reeds and sedge.

A review of plant life in the park recorded the following counts of species: 872 vascular plants (with 61 mosses), 166 lichen, 24 mushroom, and various in other categories.

== Animals ==
Wetlands are important habitat for fish and water species. There are 60 lakes in Meshcheyora, with northern pike, perch, common roach, and carp. Beavers are common and can be seen digging holes and building dams. Aquatic species counts have recorded 110 aquatic invertebrates, 26 species of fish, and 10 amphibians. Birds are attracted to the wetlands, with 208 species recorded in the park.

== History ==
In medieval times, the area was the home a tribe of Volga-Finns, known as the Meshchera. They were fishers, hunters, and bronze craftsmen; because the marshland of the Meshchera Lowlands were less attractive to the agricultural groups (such as the Slavs) moving in during the eleventh/twelfth centuries, the Meshchera were able to hold onto their identity and language until relatively late (probably the 16th century).

Forest fires and peat fires are a recurring danger to Meshcheyora park. Many of the areas are quite dry during the summer, and the areas with underlying peat - a natural fuel - burn readily. To address this, the park is upgrading the water levels in the park and increasing the use of modern fire-fighting equipment and techniques. The Russian report on Ramsar wetlands noted in 2015 that "The Meshchora National Park (neighboring to the Floodplains of the Oka and Pra Rivers Ramsar site) has been implementing a long-term peatland restoration program since 2003. Over 6,000 ha of degraded peatlands were rewetted by 2015."

Map of Moshchyora

== Tourism ==
Meshchyora is oriented to family recreation and ecotourism. Because of its proximity to Moscow, there are many tourist agencies supporting tours, hostels, and services. For campers, park has not only campsites, but also makes available the hiring of cooks, instructors, and guides - and the rental of tents, cooking equipment, and sleeping bags. For exploring the waters, the park loans inflatable rafts or motor boats.

== See also ==
- Protected areas of Russia
- 2010 Russian wildfires
