= Ryazansky District, Ryazan Oblast =

Ryazansky District Рязанский район (Russian)
- District
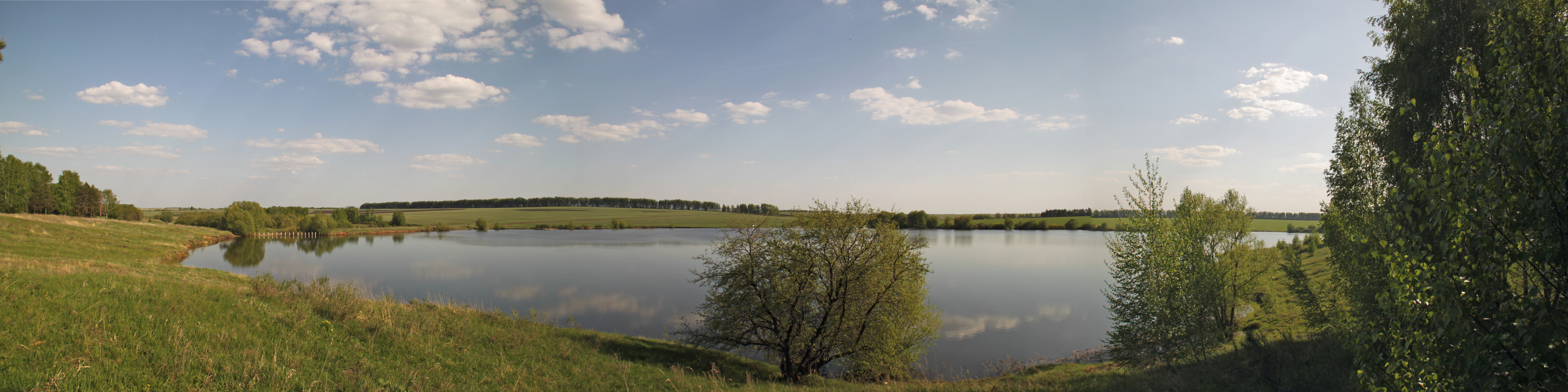
- Panorama Lake, Ryazansky District

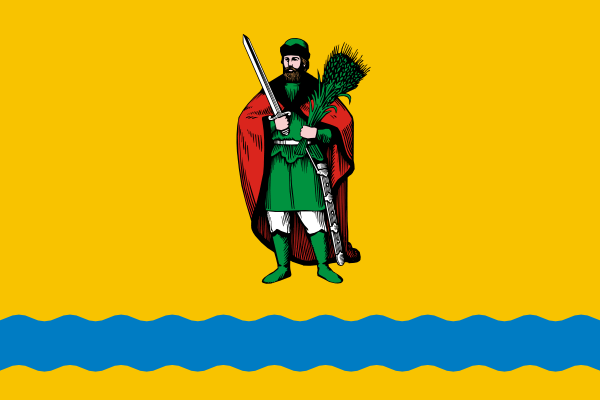
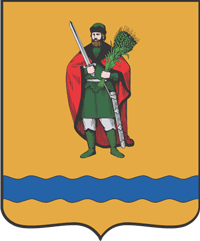
- Flag Coat of arms
- Location of Ryazansky District in Ryazan Oblast
- Coordinates: 54°36′N 39°42′E
- Country: Russia
- Federal subject: Ryazan Oblast
- Established: 12 July 1929
- Administrative center: Ryazan

Area
  - Total: 2,170 km^{2} (840 sq mi)

Population (2010 Census)
  - Total: 56,869
  - Density: 26.2/km^{2} (67.9/sq mi)
  - Urban: 0%
  - Rural: 100%

Administrative structure
  - Administrative divisions: 35 rural okrug
  - Inhabited localities: 178 rural localities

Municipal structure
  - Municipally incorporated as: Ryazansky Municipal District
  - Municipal divisions: 0 urban settlements, 21 rural settlements
- Time zone: UTC+3 (MSK)
- OKTMO ID: 61634000
- Website: http://www.rzraion.ru/

Ryazansky District (Russian: Ряза́нский райо́н) is an administrative and municipal district (raion), one of the twenty-five in Ryazan Oblast, Russia. It is located in the northwest of the oblast. The area of the district is 2,170 square kilometers (840 sq mi). Its administrative center is the city of Ryazan (which is not administratively a part of the district). Population: 56,869 (2010 Census); 56,836 (2002 census); 74,721 (1989 Soviet census).

== Administrative and municipal status ==
Within the framework of administrative divisions, Ryazansky District is one of the twenty-five in the oblast. The city of Ryazan serves as its administrative center, despite being incorporated separately as a city of oblast significance—an administrative unit with the status equal to that of the districts.

As a municipal division, the district is incorporated as Ryazansky Municipal District. The city of oblast significance of Ryazan is incorporated separately from the district as Ryazan Urban Okrug.

== Economy and transportation ==
The Solotchinskoye peat narrow gauge railway serves a peat factory which became operational in 2010.
