= Mesherskoye peat railway =

Coordinates: 55.05131°N 40.09051°E

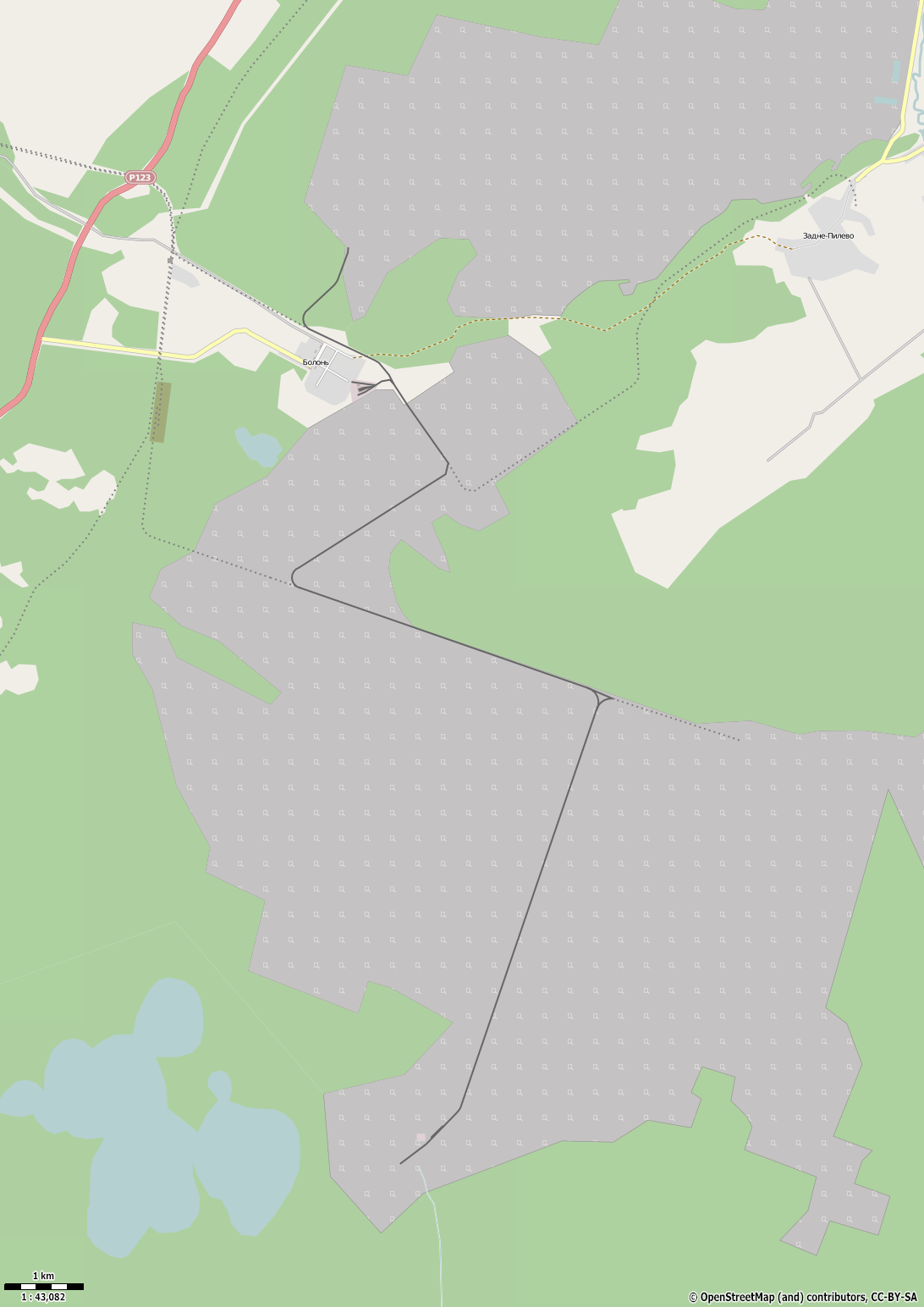

Overview
- Locale: Ryazan Oblast, Russia
- Termini: Bolon
- Website: www.peter-peat.com

Service
- Type: Narrow-gauge railway
- Operator(s): ООО «Peter-Peat»

History
- Opened: 1952

Technical
- Line length: 46 kilometres (29 mi)
- Track gauge: 750 mm (2 ft 5 1/2 in)

The Mesherskoye peat railway is located in Ryazan Oblast, Russia. The peat railway was opened in 1952, and has a total length of 46 kilometres (29 mi) is currently operational; the track gauge is 750 mm (2 ft 5 1/2 in).

== Current status ==
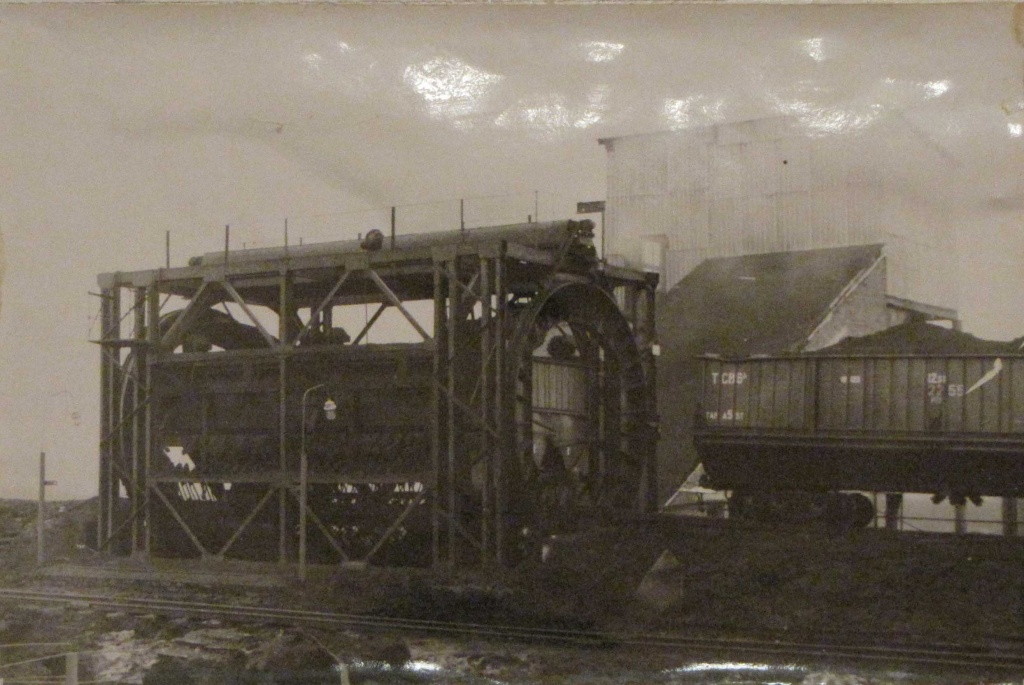
Rotary car dumper

Mesherskoye peat railway emerged in the 1952s, in the area Klepikovsky District, in a settlement named Bolon. The railway was built for hauling peat and workers and operates year-round with several pairs of trains a day. A peat factory was built and put into operation in 2013.

== Rolling stock ==
=== Locomotives ===
- TU6A – № 2540
- TU4 – № 2314, 2314, 2054
- ESU2A – № 1003, 997, 684
- Draisine – PMD3
- TD-5U "Pioneer"

=== Railroad car ===
- Flatcar
- Tank car
- Snowplow
- Crane (railroad)
- Tank car – fire train
- Passenger car (rail)
- Track laying cranes
- Open wagon for peat
- Hopper car to transport track ballast
Historical Photos

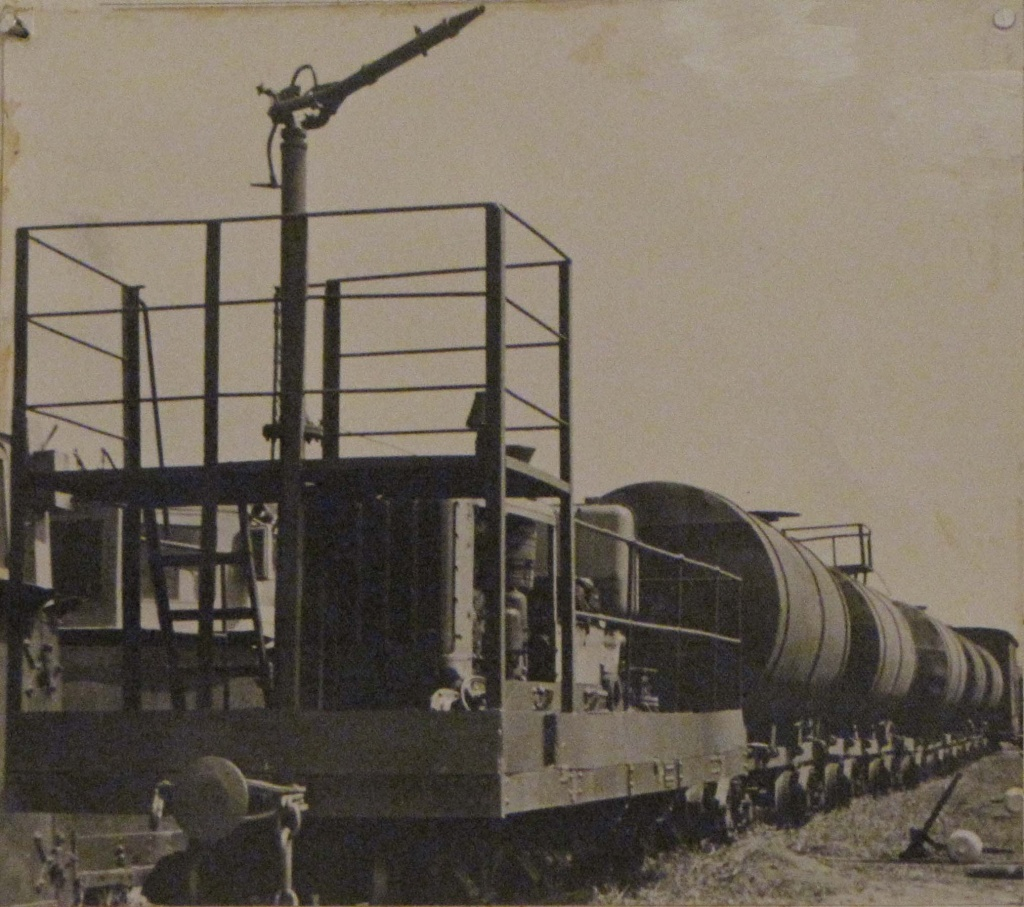
Tank car – fire train

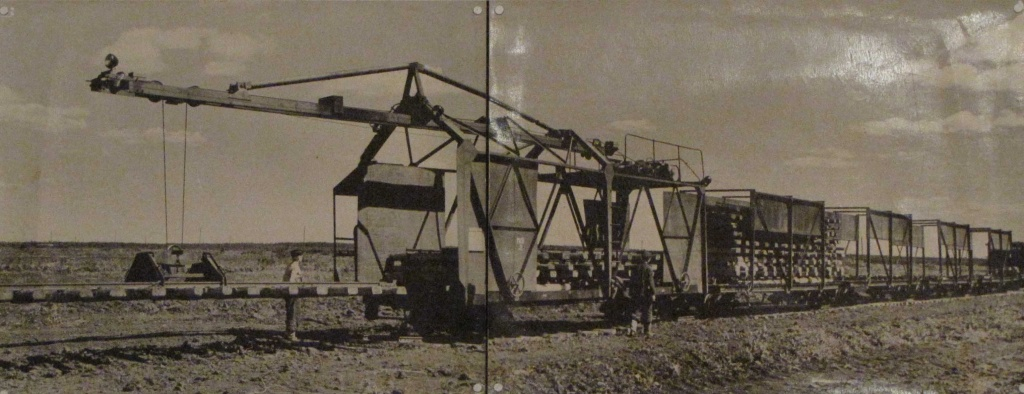
Railway construction – track laying cranes

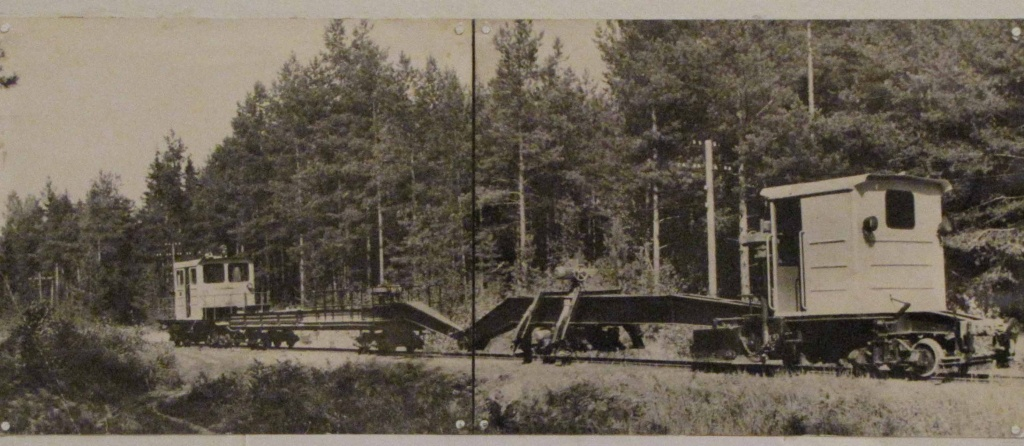
Work train

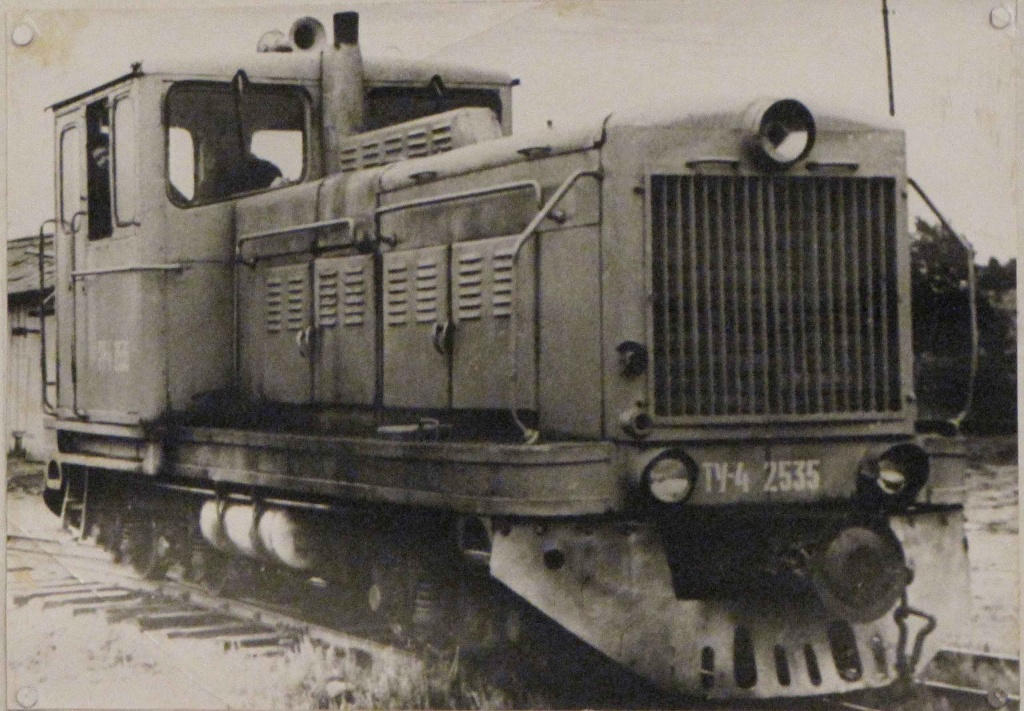
Locomotive TU4-2535

== Gallery ==
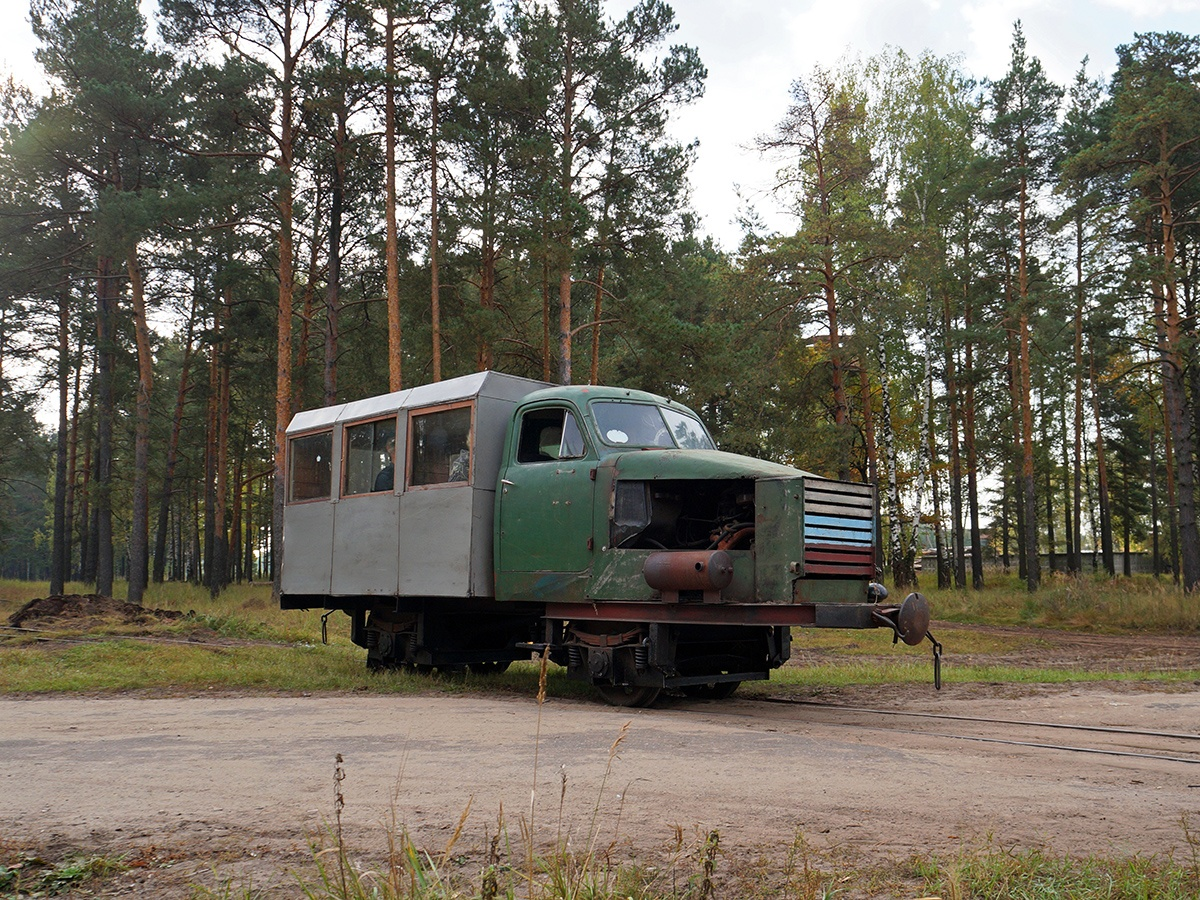
Draisine – PMD3

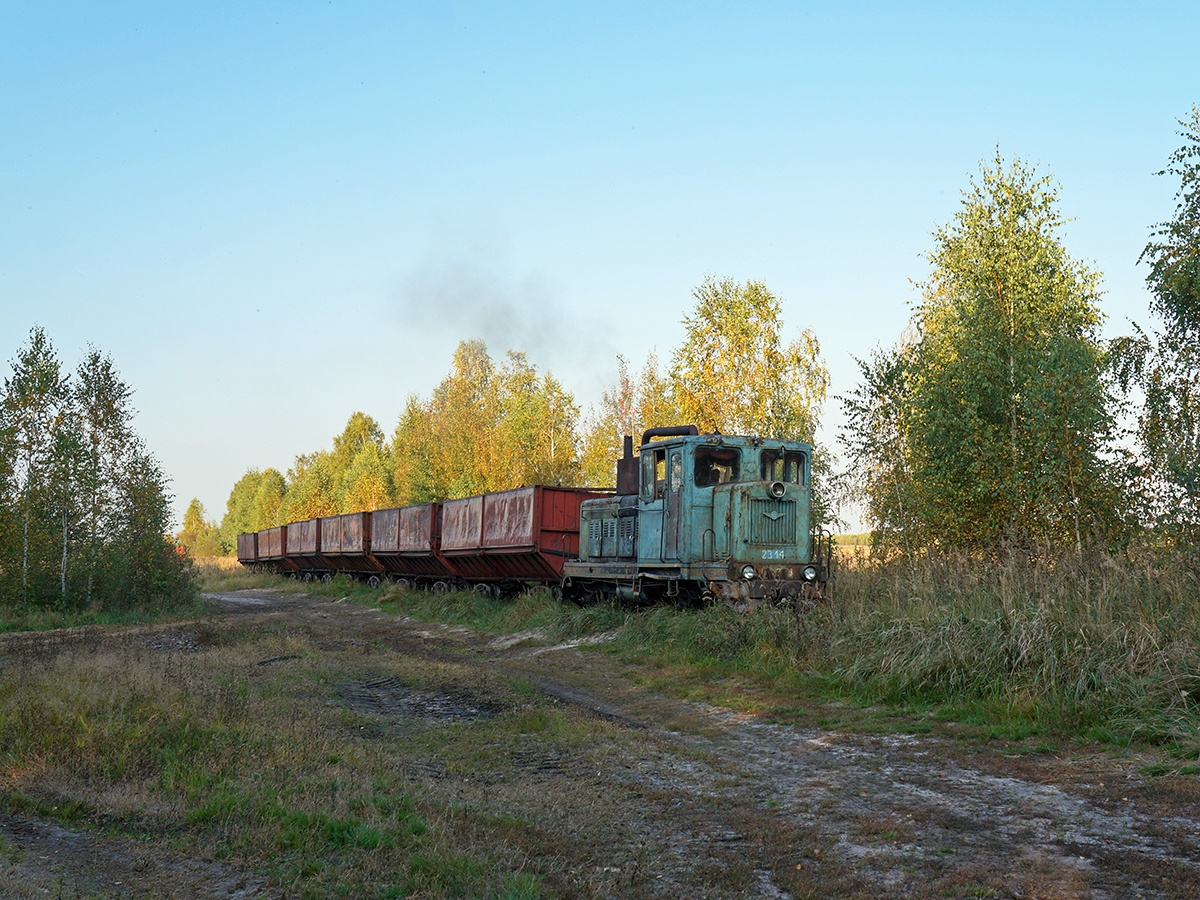
Locomotive TU4-2314 with freight train

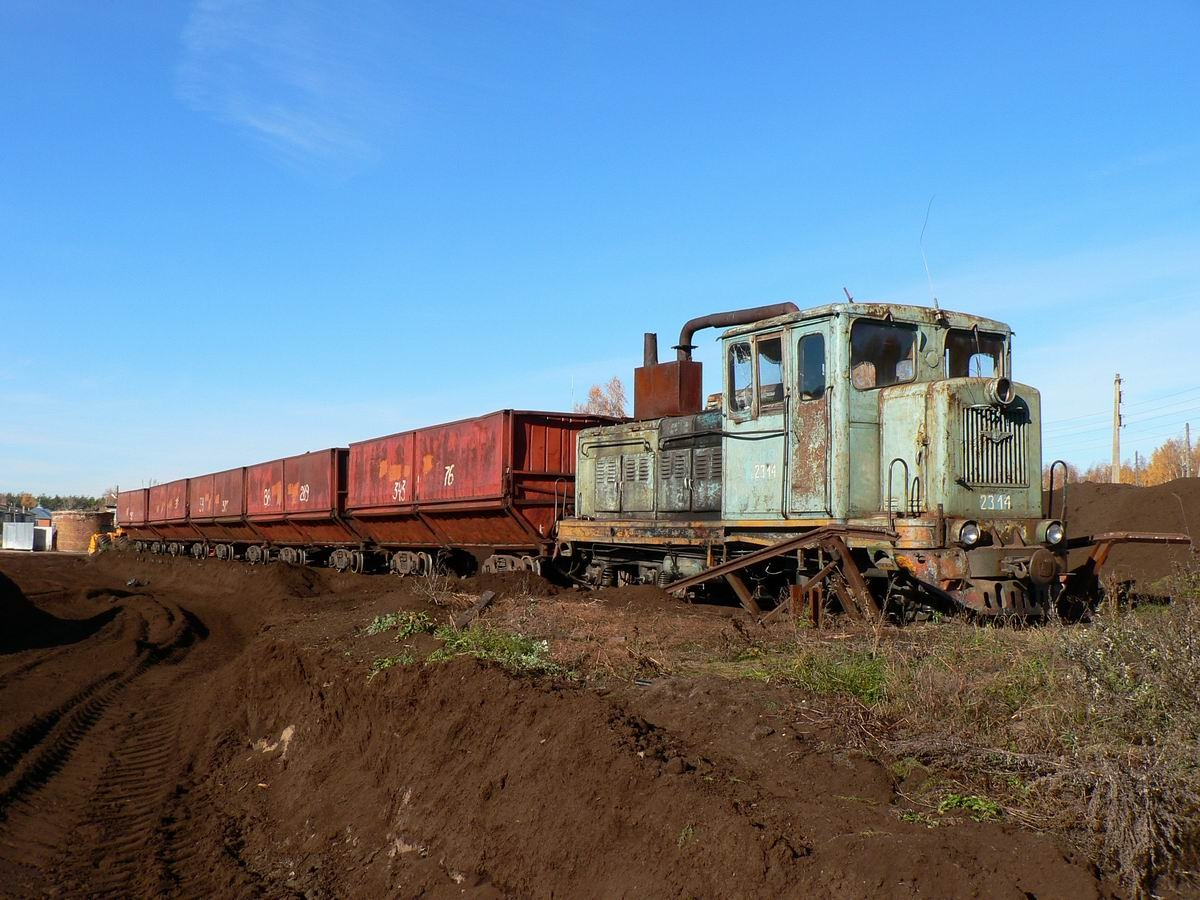
Locomotive TU4-2314 with freight train

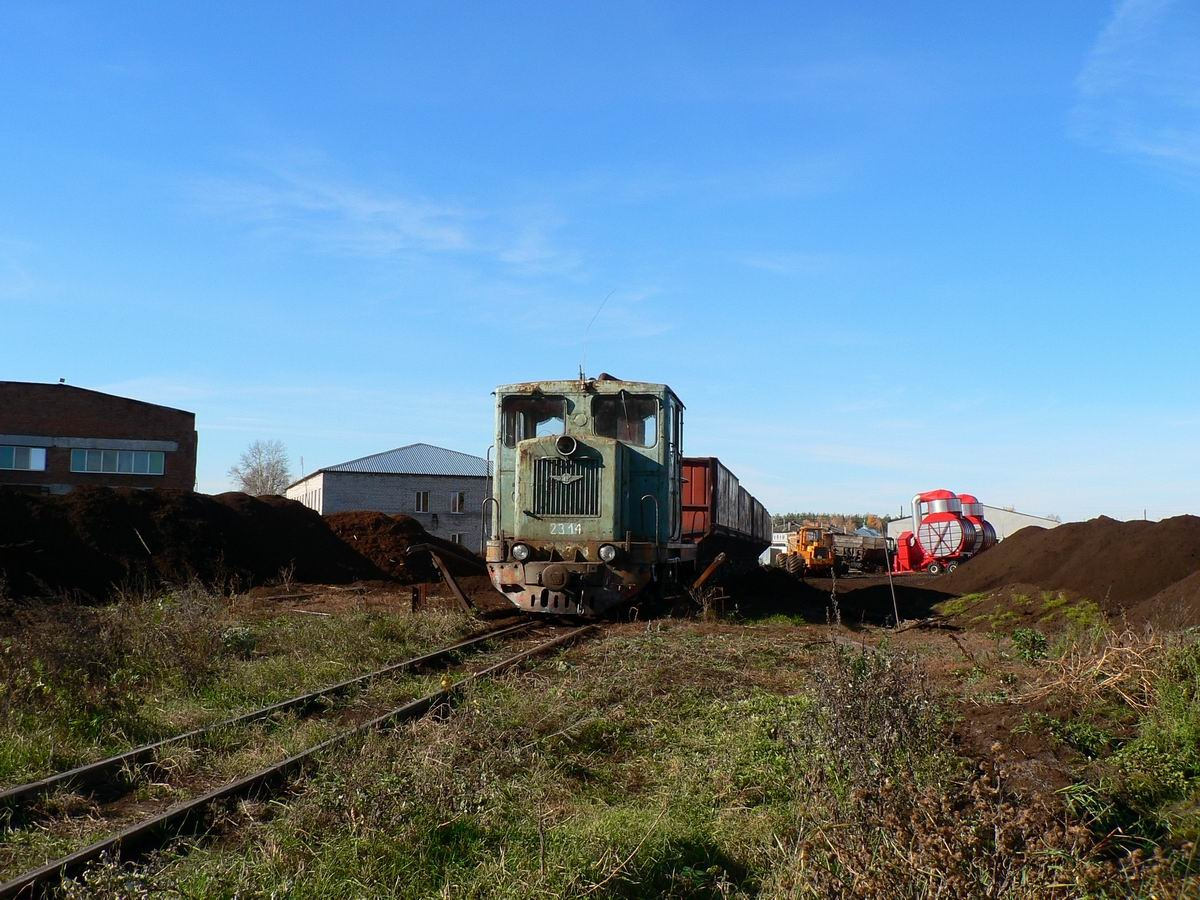
Locomotive TU4-2314 with freight train

== See also ==
- Narrow-gauge railways in Russia
- Solotchinskoye peat railway
