= Solotchinskoye peat railway =

Coordinates: 54.80739°N 40.02821°E

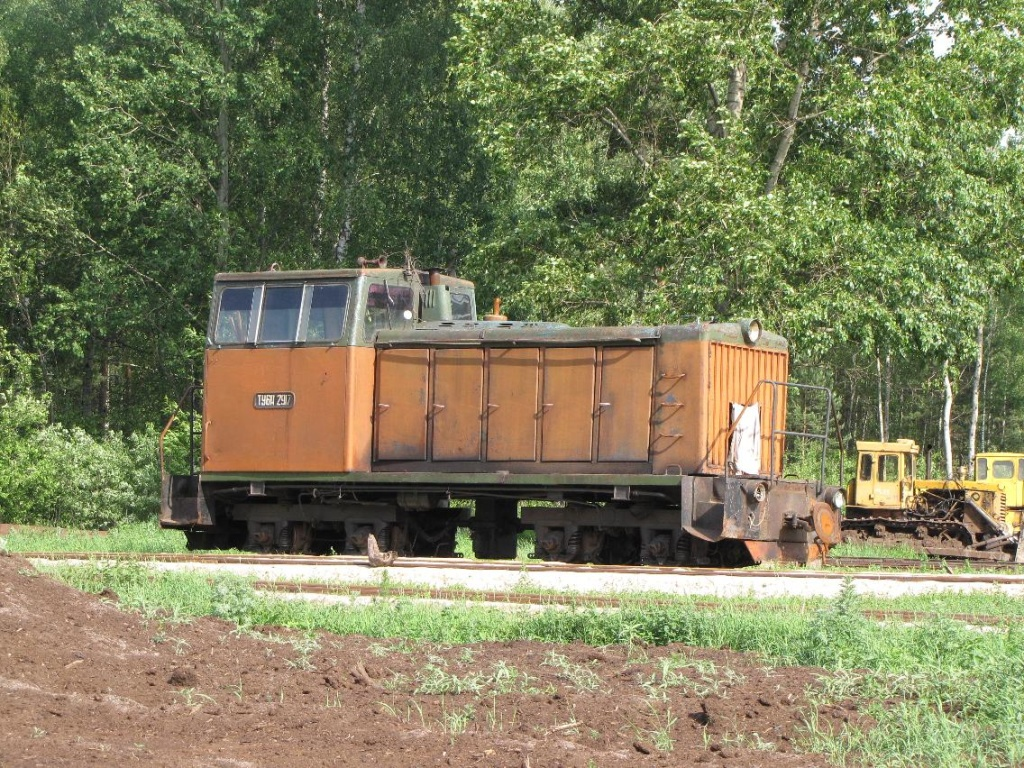

Overview
- Locale: Ryazan Oblast, Russia
- Termini: Priozerny
- Website: www.peter-peat.com

Service
- Type: Narrow-gauge railway
- Operator(s): ООО «Peter-Peat»

History
- Opened: 2010

Technical
- Line length: 3 kilometres (1.9 mi)
- Track gauge: 750 mm (2 ft 5 1/2 in)
Route map
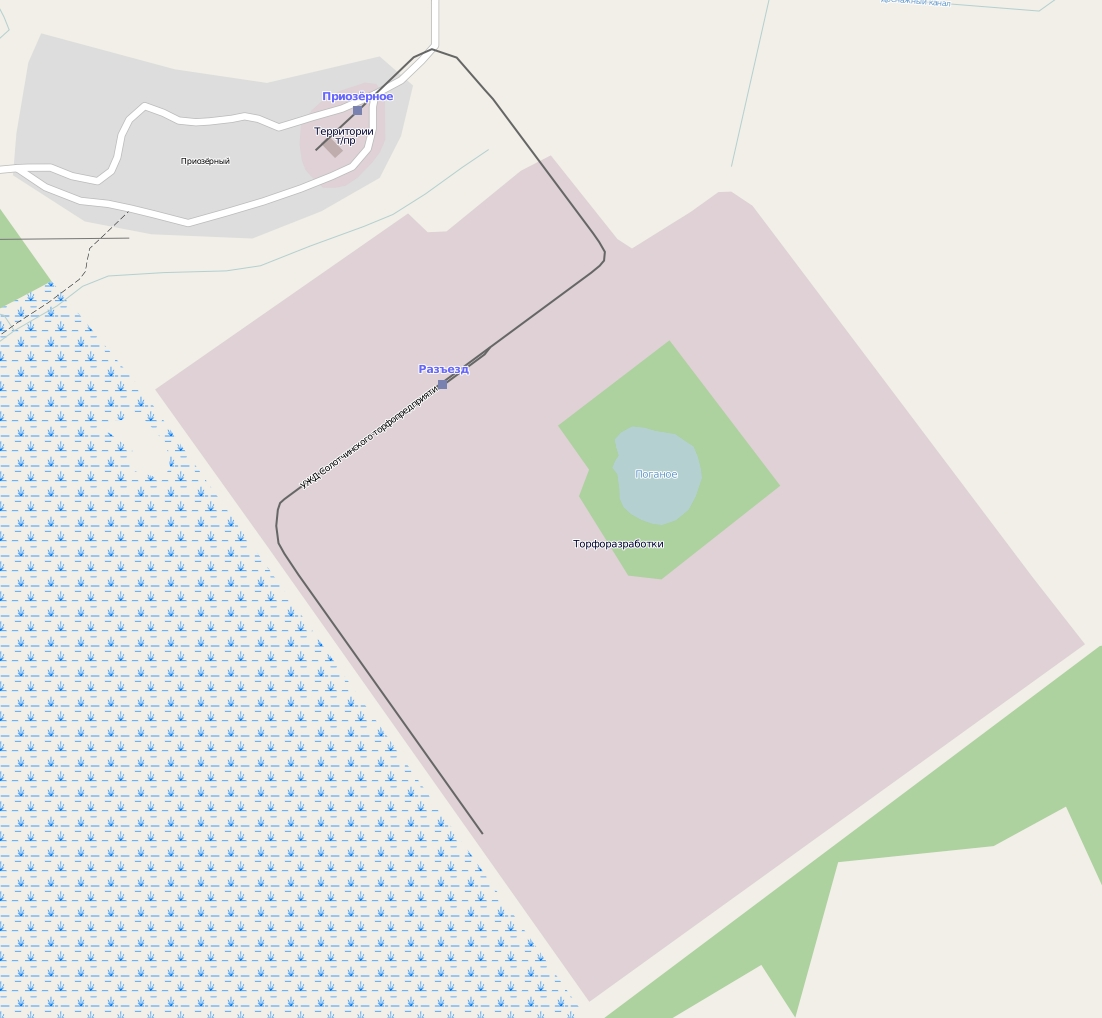

The Solotchinskoye peat railway is located in Ryazan Oblast, Russia. The peat railway was opened in 2010, has a total length of 3 kilometres (1.9 mi) and is currently operational. The track gauge is 750 mm (2 ft 5 1/2 in).

== Current status ==
Solotchinskoye peat railway emerged in the 1950s, in the area Ryazansky District, in a settlement named Priozerny. The railway had a maximum length of about 12 kilometres (7.5 mi) at their peak. Railway was built for hauling peat and workers in 1995 the railway was dismantled. Work restoration railway started in 2010, work continued throughout the year. The railway has been restored for the transport of peat and has a total length of 3 kilometres (1.9 mi), and operates year-round. A peat briquette factory was built and put into operation in 2010 in a settlement named Priozerny.

== Rolling stock ==
=== Locomotives ===
- TU6A – No. 2917
- ESU2A – No. 402, 1003
- TD-5U Pioneer

=== Railroad car ===
- Flatcar
- Snowplow
- Track laying cranes
- Open wagon for peat
- Hopper car to transport track ballast

== Gallery ==
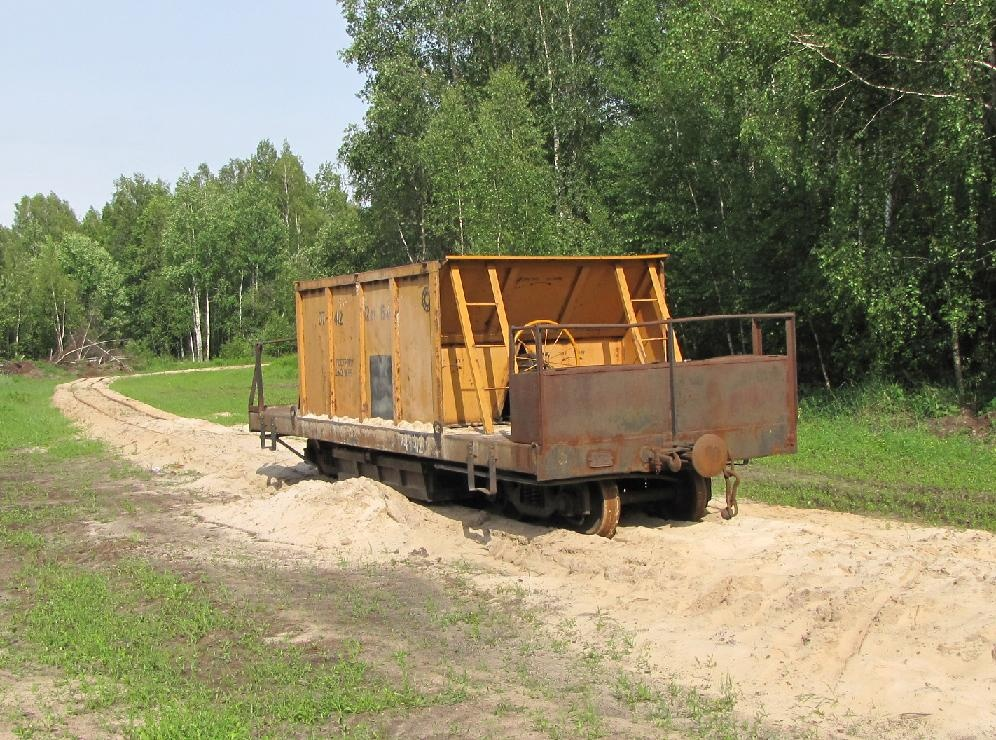
Hopper car to transport track ballast

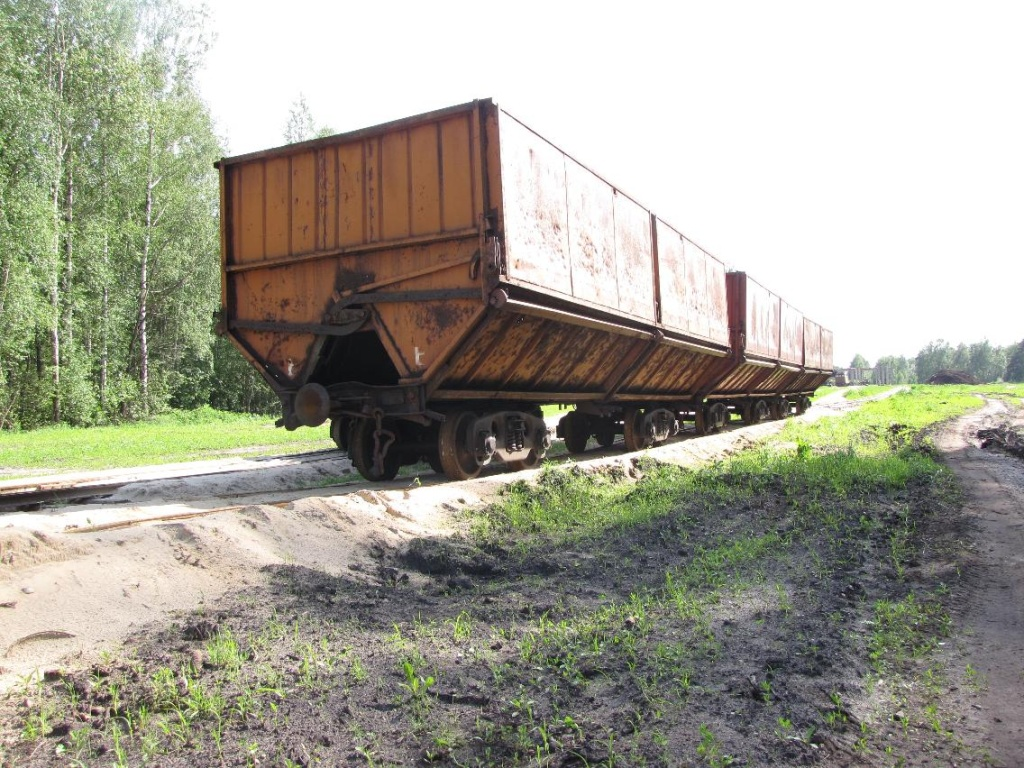
Open wagon for peat

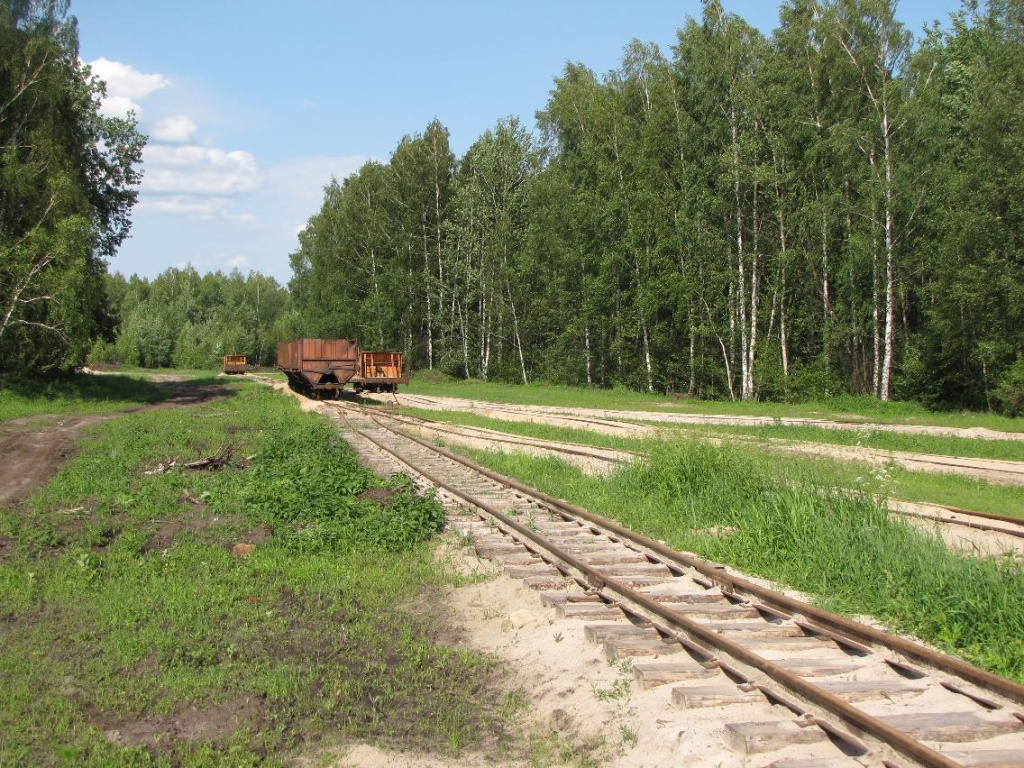
Track new

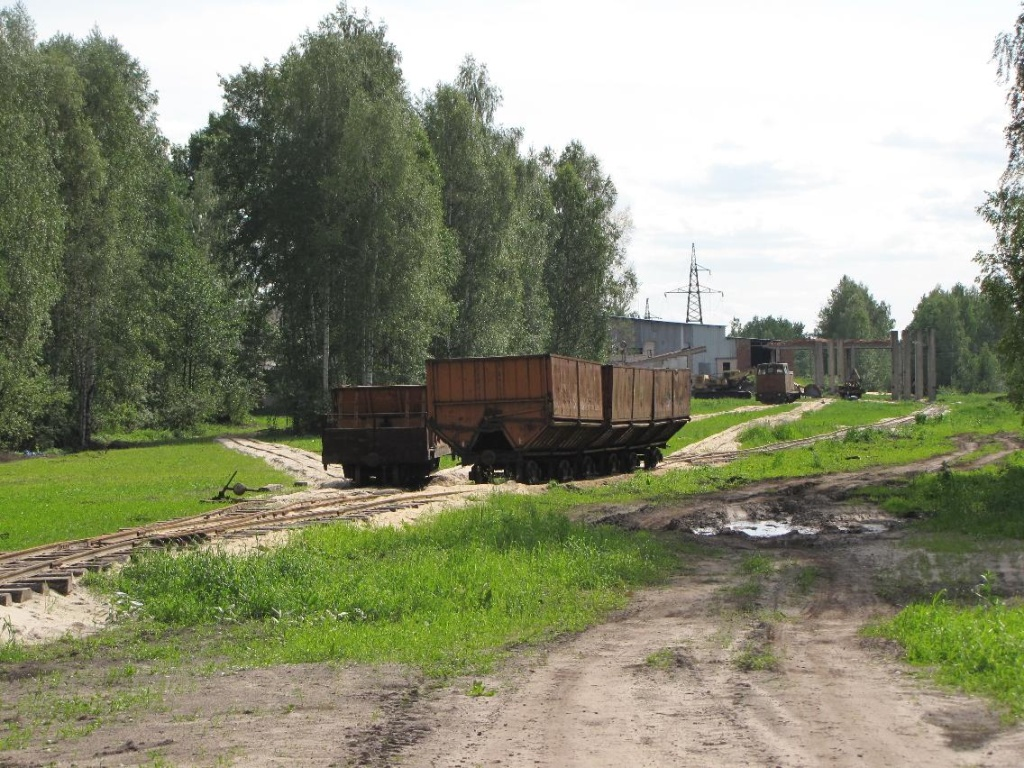
Open wagon for peat

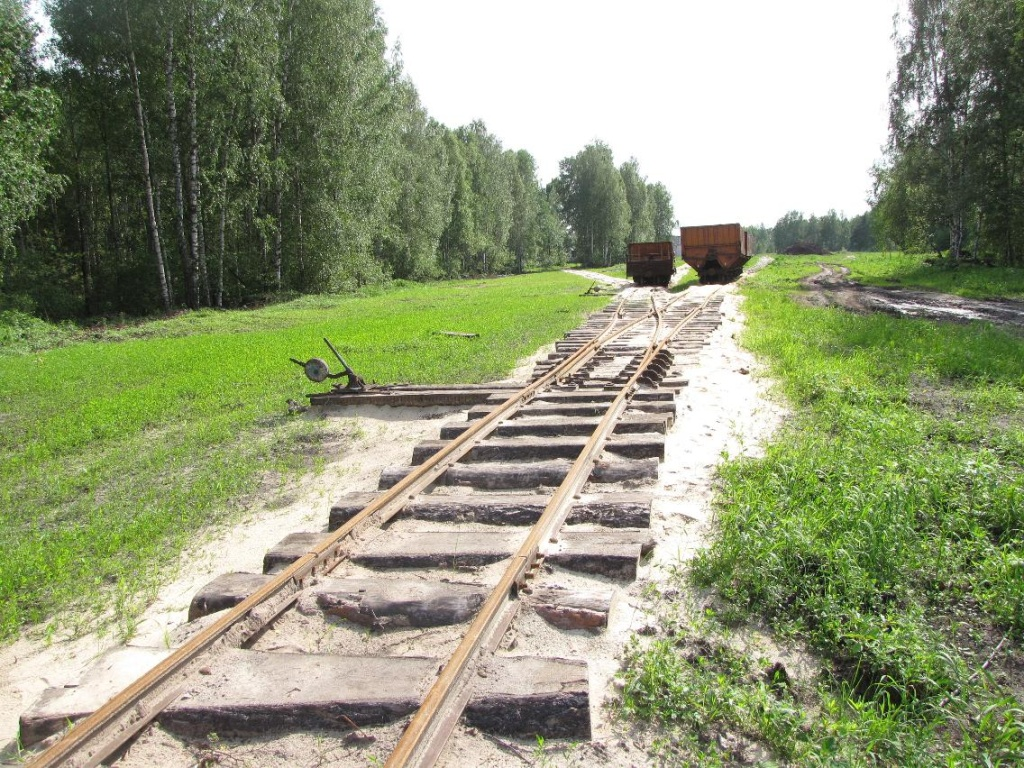
Railroad switch new

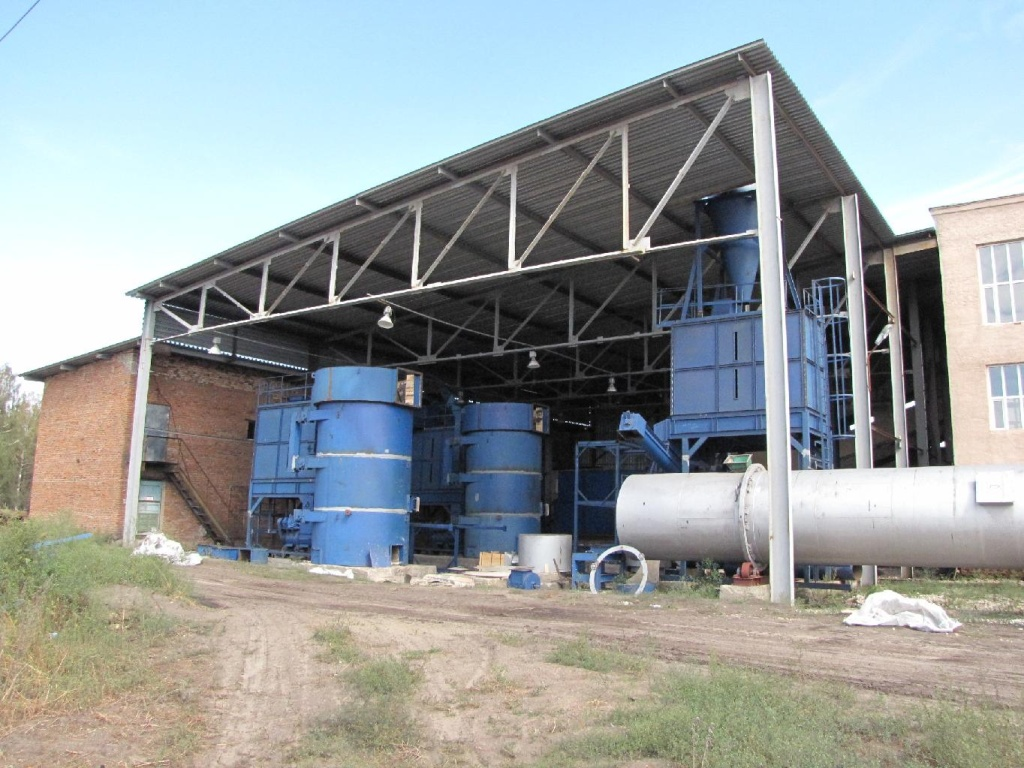
Peat briquette factory

== See also ==
- Narrow-gauge railways in Russia
- Mesherskoye peat narrow-gauge railway
