= Ryazan Oblast =

First-level administrative division of Russia

Ryazan Oblast Рязанская область (Russian)
- Oblast
- Flag Coat of arms

- Coordinates: 54°24′N 40°36′E
- Country: Russia
- Federal district: Central
- Economic region: Central
- Established: September 26, 1937
- Administrative center: Ryazan

Government
  - Body: Oblast Duma
  - Governor: Pavel Malkov

Area
  - Total: 39,605 km^{2} (15,292 sq mi)
  - Rank: 58th

Population (2021 census)
  - Total: 1,102,810
  - Estimate (2018): 1,121,474
  - Rank: 44th
  - Density: 27.845/km^{2} (72.119/sq mi)
  - Urban: 71.4%
  - Rural: 28.6%

GDP (nominal, 2024)
  - Total: ₽817 billion (US$9.59 billion)
  - Per capita: ₽757,419 (US$8,887.7)
- Time zone: UTC+3 (MSK)
- ISO 3166 code: RU-RYA
- License plates: 62
- OKTMO ID: 61000000
- Official languages: Russian
- Website: http://www.ryazangov.ru

Ryazan Oblast (Note: Russian: Рязанская область, romanized: Ryazanskaya oblastʹ, IPA: [rʲɪˈzanskəjə ˈobləsʲtʲ]) (Russian: Рязанская область), also referred to as Ryazanshchina (Russian: Рязанщина), is a federal subject of Russia (an oblast). Its administrative center is the city of Ryazan, which is also the oblast's largest city.

== Geography ==
Ryazan Oblast borders Vladimir Oblast (N), Nizhny Novgorod Oblast (NE), the Republic of Mordovia (E), Penza Oblast (SE), Tambov Oblast (S), Lipetsk Oblast (SW), Tula Oblast (W), and Moscow Oblast (NW).

In terms of physical geography, Ryazan Oblast lies in the central part of the Russian Plain between the Central Russian and Volga uplands. The terrain is flat, with the highest point of no more than 300 m above sea level. Soils are podzolic and boggy on the left bank of the Oka, changing southward to more fertile podzolic and leached black-earths (chernozyom).

=== Hydrography ===
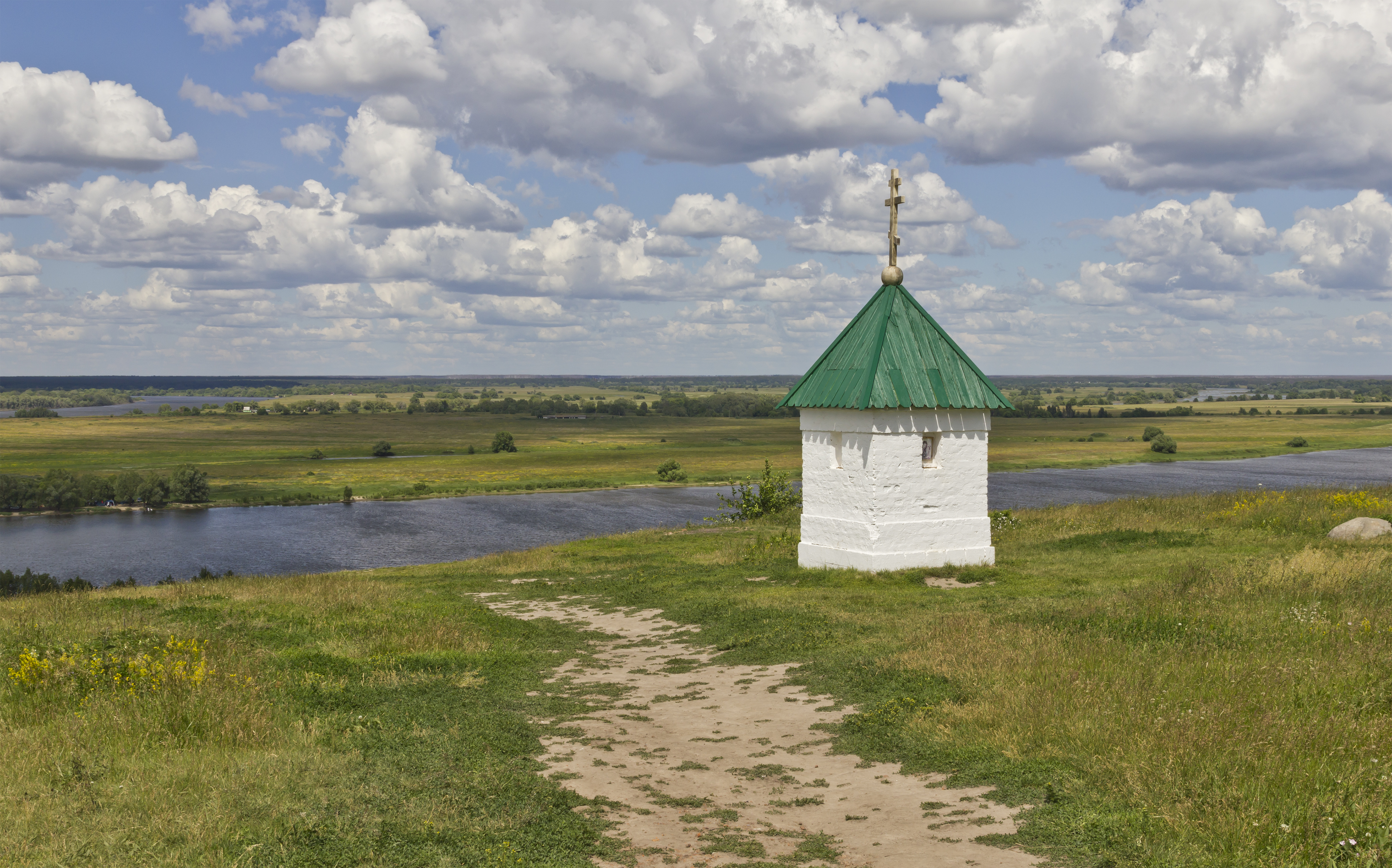
The Oka River near Konstantinovo in Rybnovsky District of Ryazan Oblast

Most of Ryazan Oblast lies within the Volga basin, with the Oka the principal river of the area.

== History ==
Human occupation of the area of the Ryazan Oblast dates from at least the Upper Paleolithic period. East Slavs, Volga Finnic, Tatar tribes inhabited the area and merged into an ethnos, a process virtually completed by the 13th century CE. In 830 the Ryazan area became part of Rus' Khaganate.

Later the Ryazan area became part of the Kievan Rus' political system and came under the domination of the Principality of Chernigov (founded in 988). The Principality of Ryazan operated as a separate entity from 1097 to 1521, when the area became part of the Grand Duchy of Moscow, though with the Qasim Khanate district retaining some autonomy until the 1550s.

The Ryazan Governorate became separate from the Moscow Governorate in 1796.

=== Soviet Union ===
Ryazan Oblast was formed out of the Moscow and Voronezh oblasts in 1937. It took its present form in 1954 when some of its southern districts were ceded to the newly established Lipetsk Oblast. Also in 1954, it was ceded parts of southern Moscow Oblast and no border changes happened afterward.

== Economy ==
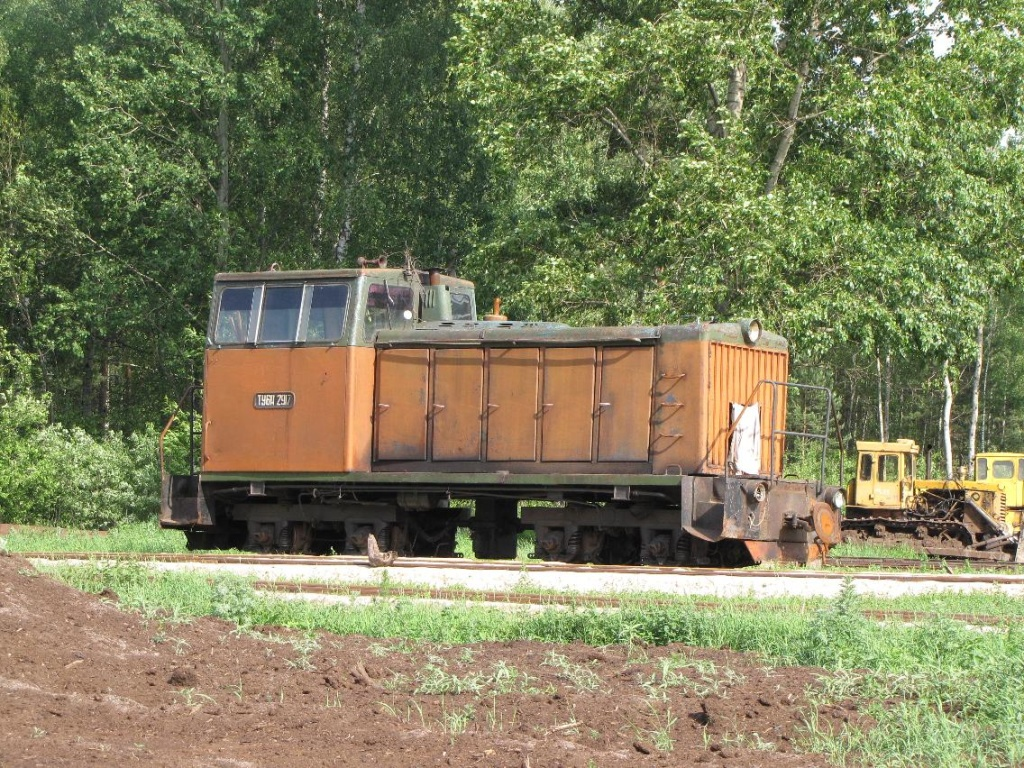
Solotchinskoye peat railway

=== Soviet Union ===
In the post-war period of the Soviet Union recovery in the wake of growing competition between USSR and US several ambitious plans severely undermined the economic stability of the region. In Ryazan Oblast, at the behest of central government led by Nikita Khrushchev, a regional administration ordered slaughter of livestock in a futile attempt to boost productivity rates (plans included tripling of meat and milk production). Because of series of misjudgement and overestimations these plans resulted in disastrous failure which is known today as Ryazan miracle (Russian: Рязанское чудо).

=== Modern ===
GDP of Ryazan Oblast by Industry (in %, 2019)
Agri- and aquaculture	8.1%
Mining and Extraction	0.16%
Processing industry (metallurgy, oil refining etc.)	26.66%
Energy	3.33%
Utilities (water supply)	0.57%
Construction	4.61%
Wholesale trade and Retail trade, professional services	14.62%
Transportation and warehousing	5.62%
Public services (restaurants and hotels)	0.61%
Information	2.81%
Finance and insurance	0.28%
Real estate	12.84%
R&D	1.69%
Administrative services	1.24%
State, security and social support	6.46%
Education	4.25%
Healthcare & social services	4.77%
Culture, sport, entertainment etc	0.82%
Other	0.35%

Ryazan Oblast is a part of the Central economic region. The oblast is economically favorable due to the water and land routes that pass through it and provide stable domestic and foreign economic ties. It is considered both an industrial and agricultural Oblast. The agriculture in the region is represented by livestock farming and plants cultivation. Livestock farming specializes in raising and fattening cattle and breeding pigs, sheep, and poultry. Beekeeping is also well developed in the region.

=== Transportation ===
- Solotchinskoye peat narrow gauge railway is located in Ryazansky District
- Mesherskoye peat narrow gauge railway is located in Klepikovsky District

== Demographics ==
Historical population
Year	Pop.	±%
1897	1,802,196	—
1926	2,428,914	+34.8%
1959	1,444,755	−40.5%
1970	1,411,590	−2.3%
1979	1,361,839	−3.5%
1989	1,345,924	−1.2%
2002	1,227,910	−8.8%
2010	1,154,114	−6.0%
2021	1,102,810	−4.4%
Source: Census data

Population: 1,102,810 (2021 census); 1,154,114 (2010 census); 1,227,910 (2002 census); 1,345,924 (1989 Soviet census).

Vital statistics for 2024:

- Births: 6,376 (5.9 per 1,000)
- Deaths: 16,555 (15.4 per 1,000)

Total fertility rate (2024):
1.12 children per woman

Life expectancy (2021):
Total — 68.61 years (male — 63.96, female — 73.31)

Ethnic composition (2010):

- Russians - 95.1%
- Ukrainians - 0.8%
- Armenians - 0.5%
- Mordvins - 0.5%
- Tatars - 0.5%
- Azeris - 0.4%
- Uzbeks - 0.3%
- Others - 1.9%
- 74,419 people were registered from administrative databases, and could not declare an ethnicity. It is estimated that the proportion of ethnicities in this group is the same as that of the declared group.

=== Religion ===
Religion in Ryazan Oblast as of 2012 (Sreda Arena Atlas)
Russian Orthodoxy	63%
Other Orthodox	1%
Other Christians	3.2%
Islam	1%
Rodnovery and other native faiths	0.6%
Spiritual but not religious	15.3%
Atheism and irreligion	8.9%
Other and undeclared	7%

According to a 2012 survey 63% of the population of Ryazan Oblast adheres to the Russian Orthodox Church, 3% are unaffiliated generic Christians, 1% are Orthodox Christian believers without belonging to church or belonging to non-Russian Orthodox churches, 1% are Muslims, and 1% are adherents of the Rodnovery (Slavic native faith) movement. In addition, 15% of the population declares to be "spiritual but not religious", 9% is atheist, and 7% follows other religions or did not give an answer to the question.

== Tourism ==
Ruins of baron Von Der Launitz's castle

Starozhilovo Gothic manor

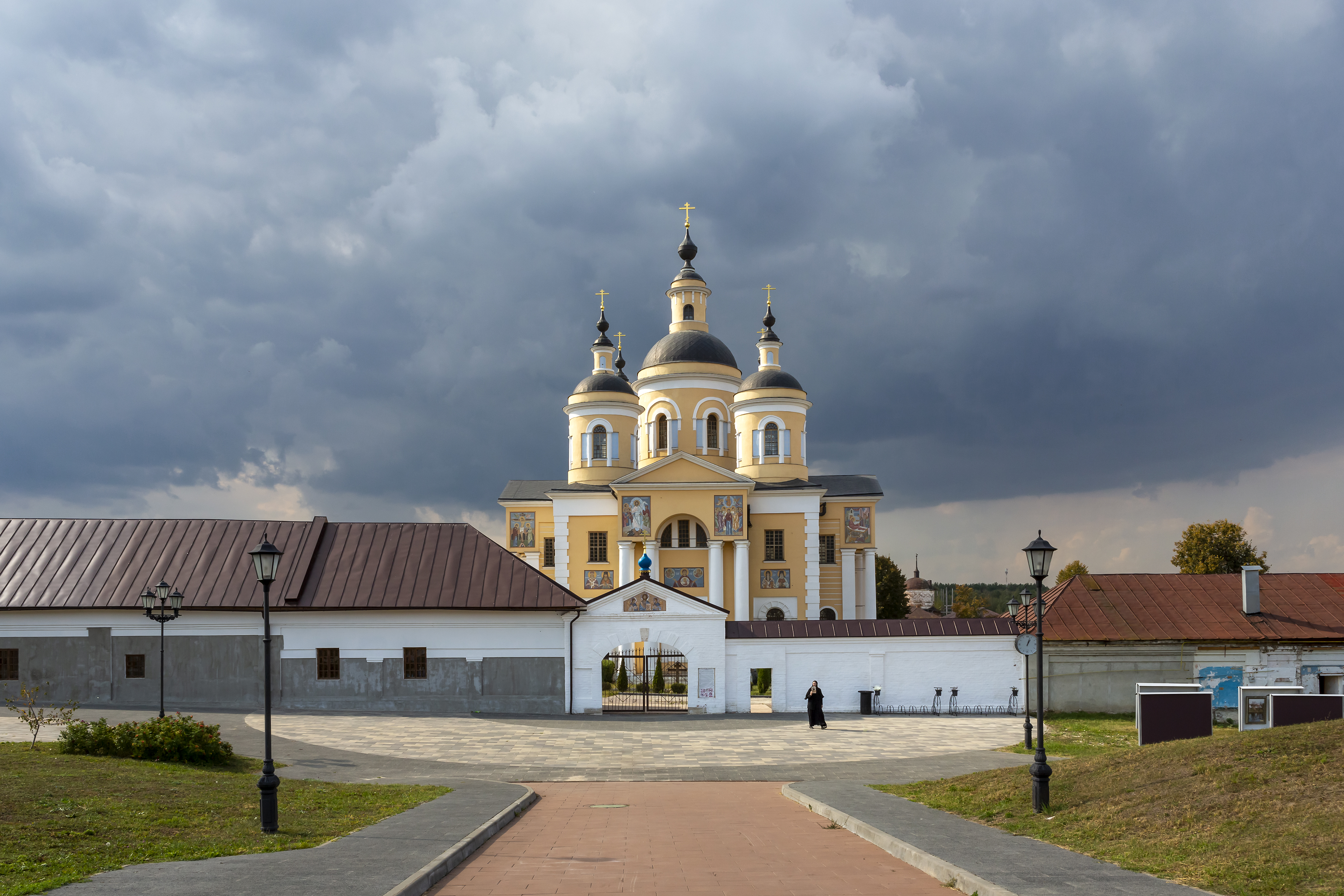
Vyshensky Uspensky monastery

== Notable people ==
=== Arts ===
- Alexander Alexandrov (1883–1946), composer
- Yuri Bykov (born 1981), filmmaker
- Erast Garin (1902–1980), comic actor
- Alexander Genis (born 1953), writer, broadcaster and cultural critic
- Yuri Kholopov (1932–2003), musicologist, music theorist, doctor of arts, and professor of the Moscow Conservatoire
- Maximilian Kravkov (1887–1937), writer
- Andrei Mironov (born 1975), painter
- Konstantin Paustovsky (1892–1968), writer
- Alexander Pirogov (1899–1964), bass opera singer
- Yakov Polonsky (1819–1898), writer
- Mikhail Saltykov-Shchedrin (1826–1889), satirist
- Aleksandr Solzhenitsyn (1918–2008), writer
- Sergei Yesenin (1895–1925), poet
- Semen Zhivago (1807–1863), historical painter

=== Athletics ===
- Vasily Alekseyev (1942–2011), weightlifter
- Anton Belov (born 1986), professional ice hockey defenceman
- Olga Kaliturina (born 1976), high jumper
- Maria Kalmykova (born 1978), basketball player
- Yuri Kuleshov (born 1981), professional football defensive midfielder
- Irina Meleshina (born 1982), long jumper
- Ivan Nifontov (born 1987), judoka
- Sergei Panov (born 1970), basketball player
- Konstantin Selyavin (born 1974), former Russian professional football player
- Kirill Sosunov (born 1975), long jumper
- Alexandra Trusova (born 2004), figure skater

=== Engineering and science ===
- Andrey Arkhangelsky (1879–1940), geologist
- Victor Balykin (born 1947), Russian physicist
- Vladimir Gulevich (1867–1933), biochemist
- Aleksei Kozhevnikov (1836–1902), neurologist and psychiatrist
- Nikolai Kravkov (1865–1924), pharmacologist
- Sergey P. Kravkov (1873–1938), soil scientist
- Sergey V. Kravkov (1893–1951), psychologist and psychophysiologist
- Andrey Markov (1856–1922), mathematician
- Ivan Michurin (1855–1935), biologist
- Sergey Nepobedimy (1921–2014), designer of rocket weaponry
- Ivan Pavlov (1849–1936), physiologist
- Konstantin Tsiolkovsky (1857–1935), engineer

=== Others ===
- Dmitry Andreikin (born 1990), chess grandmaster
- Roman Putin (born 1977), businessman
