= Kravkov =

Kravkov (masculine, Russian: Кравков) or Kravkova (feminine, Russian: Кравкова) is a Russian surname. Notable people with the surname include:

- Maximilian Kravkov (1887–1937), Russian geologist and writer
- Nikolai Kravkov (1865–1924), Russian pharmacologist, brother of Vasily
- Sergey Kravkov (disambiguation), several people
- Vasily Kravkov (1859–1920), Russian military doctor, brother of Nikolai
