= Sergey Kravkov =

Sergey Kravkov may refer to

- Sergey Kravkov (explorer) (1894–1942), Soviet hydrographer and Arctic explorer
- Sergey Kravkov (agronomist) (1873–1938), Russian soil scientist and agricultural chemist
- Sergey Kravkov (psychologist) (1893–1951), Russian psychologist and psychophysiologist
