= Nikolai Kravkov =

Russian pharmacologist

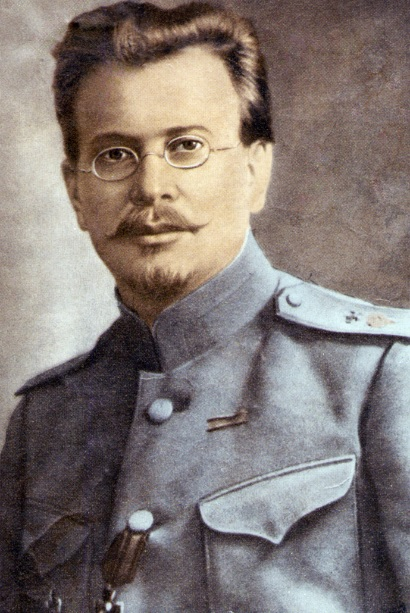
- Born: Nikolai Pavlovich Kravkov; 8 March 1865; Ryazan, Russian Empire
- Died: 24 April 1924 (aged 59); Leningrad, USSR
- Education: Saint Petersburg University, Imperial Military Medical Academy
- Known for: founder of the Russian scientific school of pharmacology
- Awards: Russian Empire: Order of St. Anna 3rd Class; Order of St. Vladimir 4rd Class; Order of St. Vladimir 3rd Class USSR: Lenin Prize (1926)
- Scientific career
- Fields: pharmacology

Signature
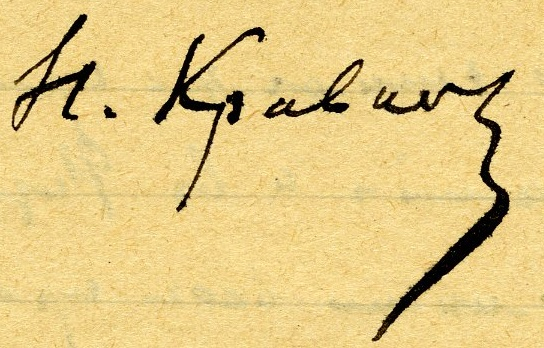

Nikolai Pavlovich Kravkov (in Russian Николай Павлович Кравков) was a prominent Russian pharmacologist, Full Member of the Imperial Military Medical Academy (1914), Corresponding Member of the Russian Academy of Science (1920), and one of the first laureates of the Lenin Prize (1926). He is considered the founder of the Russian scientific school of pharmacology.

== Biography ==
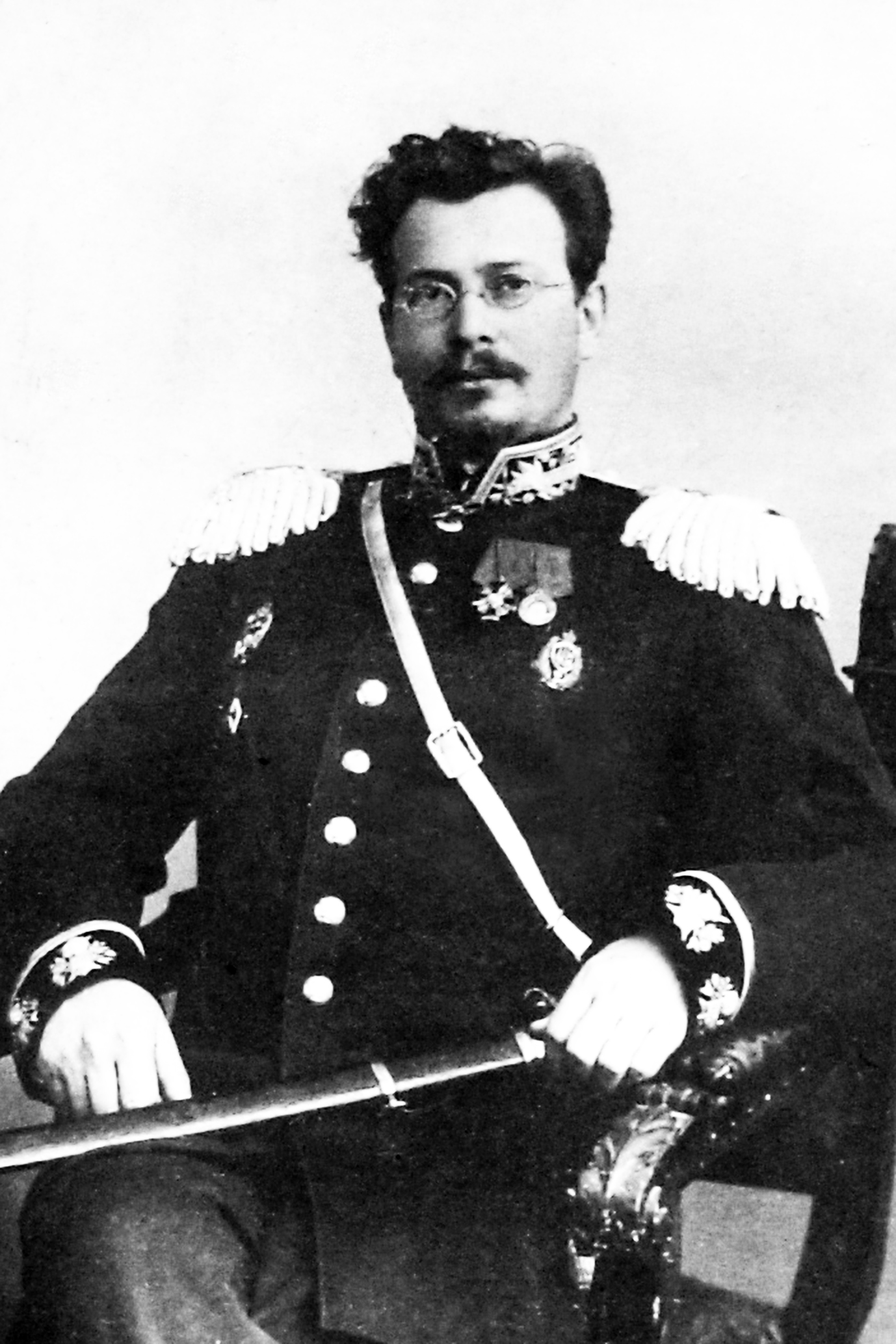
Nikolai Kravkov as Professor of the Imperial Military Medical Academy. Circa 1915

Nikolai Kravkov was born a sixth child in the family of a non-commissioned officer Pavel Alexeyevich Kravkov (1826–1910), who served as a senior clerk in the office of the Chief Enlistment Officer of the Ryazan Governorate. According to the family legend, the scientist's mother Evdokia (Avdotia) Ivanovna (1834–1891), before wedding a "Kaluga petty bourgeois", was an illegitimate daughter of Konstantin Kavelin (1818–1885), a famous Russian historian, jurist and sociologist, one of the ideologists of Russian liberalism during the age of the reforms of Alexander II.

In 1876–1884 Nikolai Kravkov attended the First Ryazan Gymnasium. In summer 1884 the future scientist was admitted to the Imperial Saint Petersburg University, where he studied at the Faculty of Mathematics and Physics. In his last year at the University Kravkov worked in Ivan Sechenov's laboratory and published two research works on enzymes. In May 1888 he graduated from the university with the grade of candidate in natural science.

In 1888–1892 Nikolai Kravkov studied at the Imperial Military Medical Academy. Professor Viktor Pashutin was a special influence on him in that period. Kravkov graduated from the academy cum laude. The Academic Conference unanimously decided to leave him in the academy «for finishing three years perfecting courses at public cost as attached to the Military Clinic Hospital being in actual service at the Military Medical Academy.

In November 1894 the scientist successfully defended his Doctor's thesis "Amyloidosis in animals, caused experimentally".

The years from 1896 to 1898 Nikolai Kravkov spent in practical trainings in different European countries (Germany, Austria-Hungary, France, Italy and Switzerland). In Berlin he attended the lectures of Hermann Emil Fischer, in Strasbourg he worked in Friedrich von Recklinghausen's laboratory and attended the lectures of Friedrich Goltz. His practical training in the Strasbourg laboratory of Oswald Schmiedeberg, the founder of modern experimental pharmacology, influenced greatly upon his further work.

On his return to Russia in 1898 Nikolai Kravkov was elected privatdocent of the Imperial Military Medical Academy. In 1899 he was given a post of Supernumerary Professor of the Pharmacology Chair. In 1904 Kravkov was elected as Professor and headed the Chair until his death. In 1910 the scientist was made Actual Civil Councilor (IV grade of the Table of Ranks). In 1914 Professor Kravkov was elected a Full Member of the Imperial Military Medical Academy.

During World War I Nikolai Kravkov was a member of the Technical Committee of the Central Scientific Technical Laboratory of the Ministry of War. In 1914–1915 he carried out a series of experiments with chemical weapon on Luga testing area near Petrograd. In the Soviet times Professor Kravkov went on collaborating with the Laboratory.

In 1920 on the recommendation of the Nobel laureate Ivan Pavlov Nikolai Kravkov was elected Corresponding Member of the Academy of Science of Russia.

Nikolai Kravkov died on 24 April 1924 in Leningrad and was buried in the cemetery of the Novodevichy Monastery.

== «Fundamentals of Pharmacology» ==
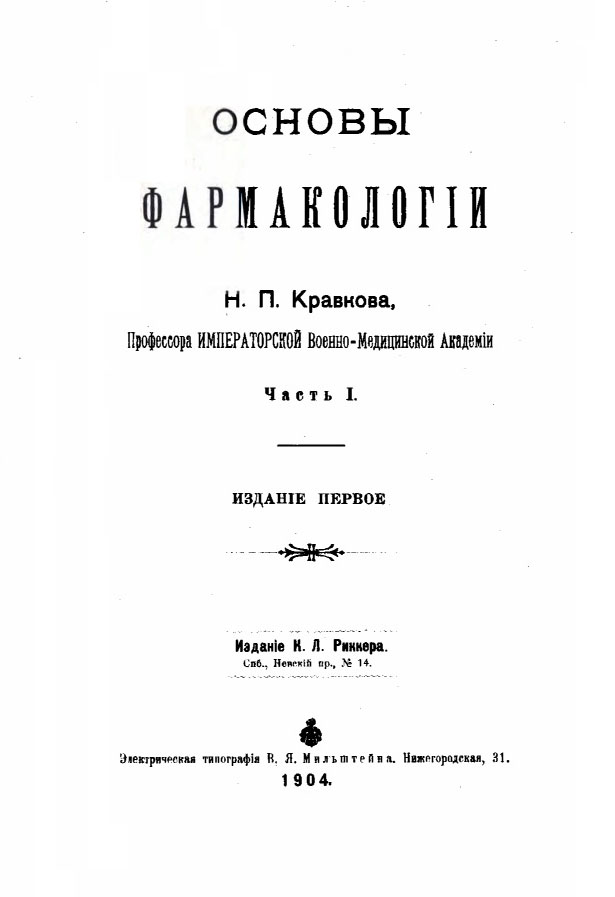
Nikolai Kravkov's "Fundamentals of Pharmacology" front page. First edition, 1904

In Nikolai Kravkov's first years as head of the Pharmacology Chair the students of the Imperial Military Medical Academy, besides his own lectures, used an obsolete textbook by Vladimir Dybkovsky «Lectures on Pharmacology» and also «Brief Manual of Pharmacology» by David Lavrov, a pharmacologist from Odessa. The students were not satisfied with these educational supplies. The creation of a new up-to-date textbook that would be up to the mark relevant to the Professor Kravkov's exam requirements became a pressing task.

The students of the Imperial Military Medical Academy frequently studied by a transcript of their Professor's lectures, arranged in the first years of his teaching. In 1901 this transcript was edited by the students Sozonovich, Ivanov and Lavrov. Nikolai Kravkov didn't know anything about this edition and didn't redact it.

From the beginning of his pedagogical activity Nikolai Kravkov felt inclined to enrich the educational textbooks with new data. In 1904–1905 two volumes of his «Fundamentals of Pharmacology» were first published. Soon it became a classical manual for students and physicians. The book was written in fine and plain language, the author suggested a very convenient principle of classification of drugs. «Fundamentals of Pharmacology» clearly exposed experimental proofs of preparations' pharmacodynamics, gave picturesque descriptions of poisoning process, gave clear indications for prescription of medicines. The textbook was illustrated by diagrams, drawings and schemes from Kravkov's laboratory. This book took into account the needs not only of students, but also of the physicians ofdifferent specialties. It may be considered the first guide on clinic pharmacology in Russia.

«Fundamentals of Pharmacology» by Professor Kravkov had 14 editions — in 1904–1905, 1907, 1909–1910, 1911, 1913, 1915, 1917, 1918, 1925–1927, 1926–1927, 1927, 1927–1928, 1928, 1930–1931 and 1933 (every succeeding edition was rearranged by the author, the last two editions were actualized by Professor Savich). Nikolai Kravkov's book became the fundamental textbook for a few generations of Russian pharmacologists.

== Scientific activity ==
«Problems of general pharmacology occupied a prominent place among Professor Kravkov's works. He studied the relationship between dose and effect of preparations, the combined effect of medicaments, the influence of temperature on pharmacologic effect and tissue adaptation to poisons. He elaborated the teaching on the phasic effect of drugs, showing that this effect depended on the difference between the drug's concentration in the tissue and in the environment. Professor Kravkov was an ardent supporter of the idea of relationship between chemical composition of a substance and its pharmacologic effect. He found in particular that the narcotic effect of aliphatic spirits in the homologous sequence increases with the growth of the number of carbon atoms in their molecules, and that the effect of sugar on the heart depends on its stereo chemical structure. A comparative study of diverse soporifics conducted by Professor Kravkov resulted in materialization of his idea of applying non-volatile somnifacients for general anesthesia. Thus, Professor Kravkov suggested application of Hedonal for intravenous anesthesia, which was immediately tested in clinics, and enjoys general recognition today. Professor Kravkov also suggested using Hedonal in combination with chloroform, which started application of so-called combined anesthesia with volatile and non-volatile or basic narcotics.

Professor Kravkov worked out several original methods of vessel perfusion in isolated organs to study their functions. They are applied today at pharmacologic and physiologic laboratories throughout the world. Vessel perfusion in isolated rabbit's ear is used on a wide scale for studying reactions of peripheral vessels to pharmacologic substances. Vessel perfusion of various endocrine glands turned out to be most valuable for studying the glands' functions and the influence of pharmacologic substances on them.

Striving to make the conditions of experiments as similar as possible to clinical conditions, Professor Kravkov laid the foundation of a new trend in pharmacology known as pathologic pharmacology. This field of pharmacology studies the peculiarities of drug effect on certain experimentally caused pathologic conditions in animals — e.g. atherosclerosis in rabbits, aseptic or infectious inflammations, etc. – and the effect of chemical substances on isolated human heart, kidney or fingers of those who died from an illness or injuries.

During the last period of his life Professor Kravkov focused his attention on studying changes in the functions of the endocrine gland entailed by pharmacologic substances. This research greatly promoted the development of clinical endocrinology».

Nikolai Kravkov's scientific heritage includes 47 main works. His disciples carried out nearly 200 researches including dozens of original thesis of great importance to science and practice. Kravkov's fundamental discoveries in pharmacology enriched Russian and world science, contributed to the development of biology, physiology and pathology. He set up the Russian school of pharmacologists of high class who later headed chairs and scientific institutions. Professor Kravkov's disciples were Academicians of the Academy of Medical Science of the USSR Sergey Anichkov and Vasily Zakusov, Corresponding Member of the Academy of Medical Science of the USSR Mikhail Nikolayev, Professors Mikhail Gramenitsky, Vasily Berezin, Grigory Shkavera, Boris Sentiurin, Anatoly Kuznetsov. Kravkov's school of pharmacologists determined the development of pharmacology in the USSR in the 20th century.

== Awards ==
Russian Empire:

- Order of Saint Anna 3rd Class
- Order of Saint Vladimir 4th Class
- Order of Saint Vladimir 3rd Class

USSR, Lenin Prize

On the 17 August 1926 the Lenin Prize Committee approved the list of the first laureates of this prestigious award. Nikolai Kravkov's name was included in it posthumously for his principal scientific works.

== Family ==
In 1891 Nikolai Kravkov married Olga Bogdanovskaya (1868–1942), daughter of famous Russian surgeon Yevstafy Bogdanovsky. The couple had two children: Olga Kravkova (1892–1942), later married to Mikhail Velichkovsky, a Navy officer, and Sergey Kravkov (1894–1942), Soviet hydrographer and arctic explorer. The couple broke up in 1898 and officially divorced in 1916. The scientist's first wife, his daughter and son died of atrophy in Leningrad besieged by the Nazis.

In 1916 Nikolai Kravkov married Ksenia Maximova (1892–1978), daughter of Nikolai Maximov (1861–?) Vice Governor of Perm. Nikolai Kravkov's elder brother was Vasily Kravkov (1859–1920), army medical officer of high rank, author of memories about Russo-Japanese War and World War I.

Nikolai Kravkov's younger brother was Sergey Kravkov (1873–1938), Professor of Saint Petersburg University, one of the first Russian soil scientists.

== Memory ==
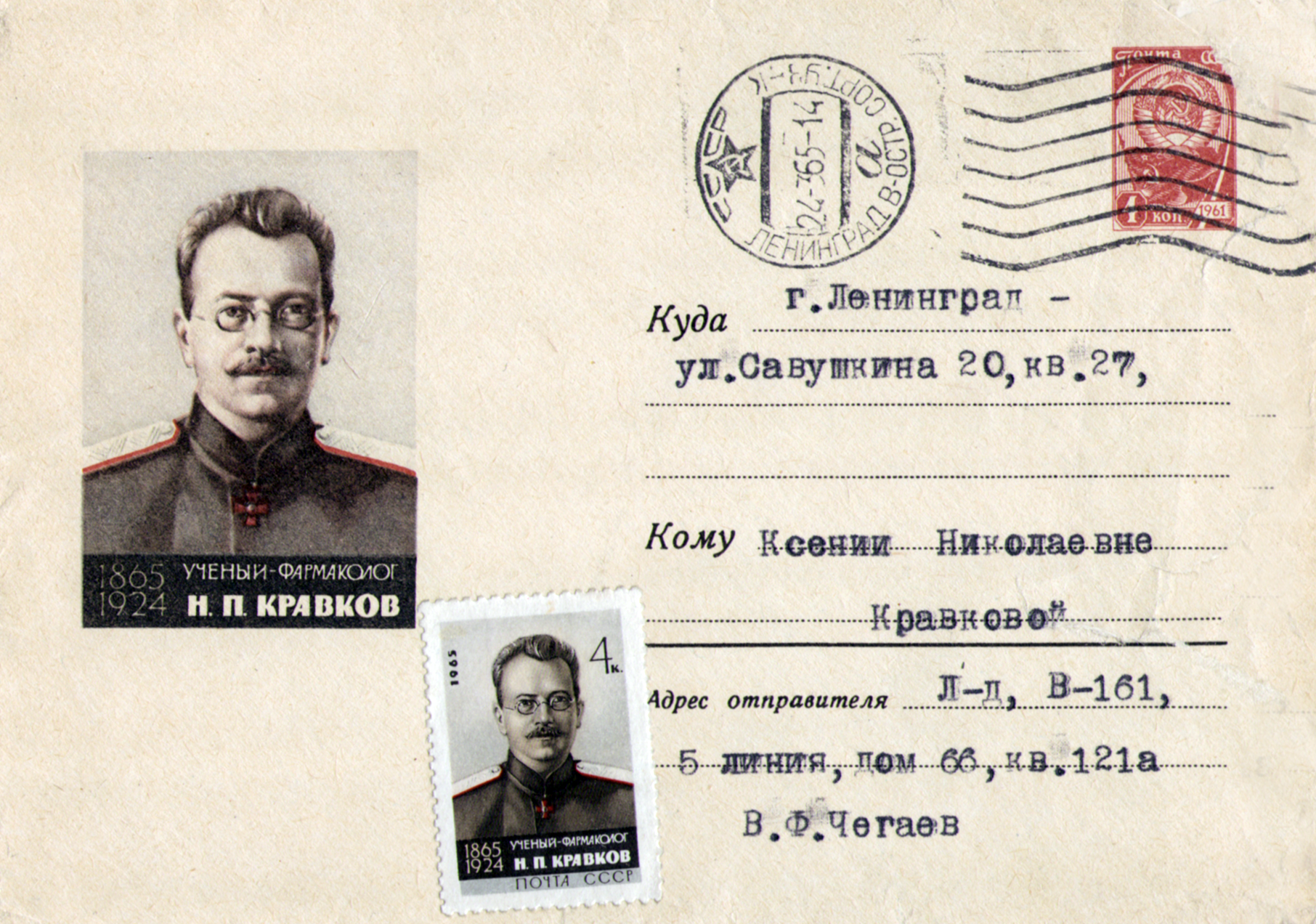
USSR mail cover and stamp dedicated to Nikolai Kravkov's Centennial (1965)

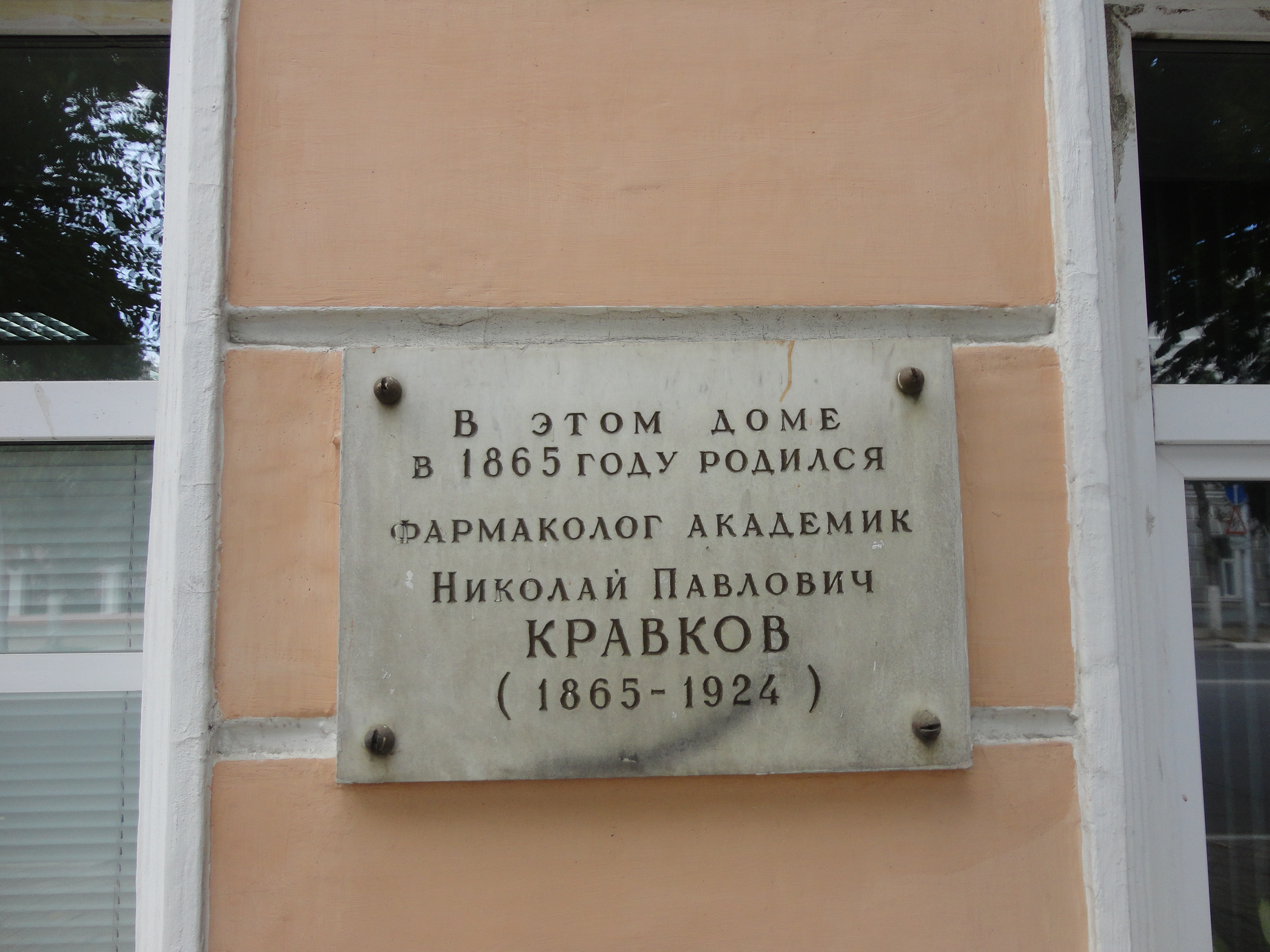
Nikolai Kravkov's plaque on his native house in Ryazan's ulitsa Lenina (former Astrakhanskaya) (1965–2016)

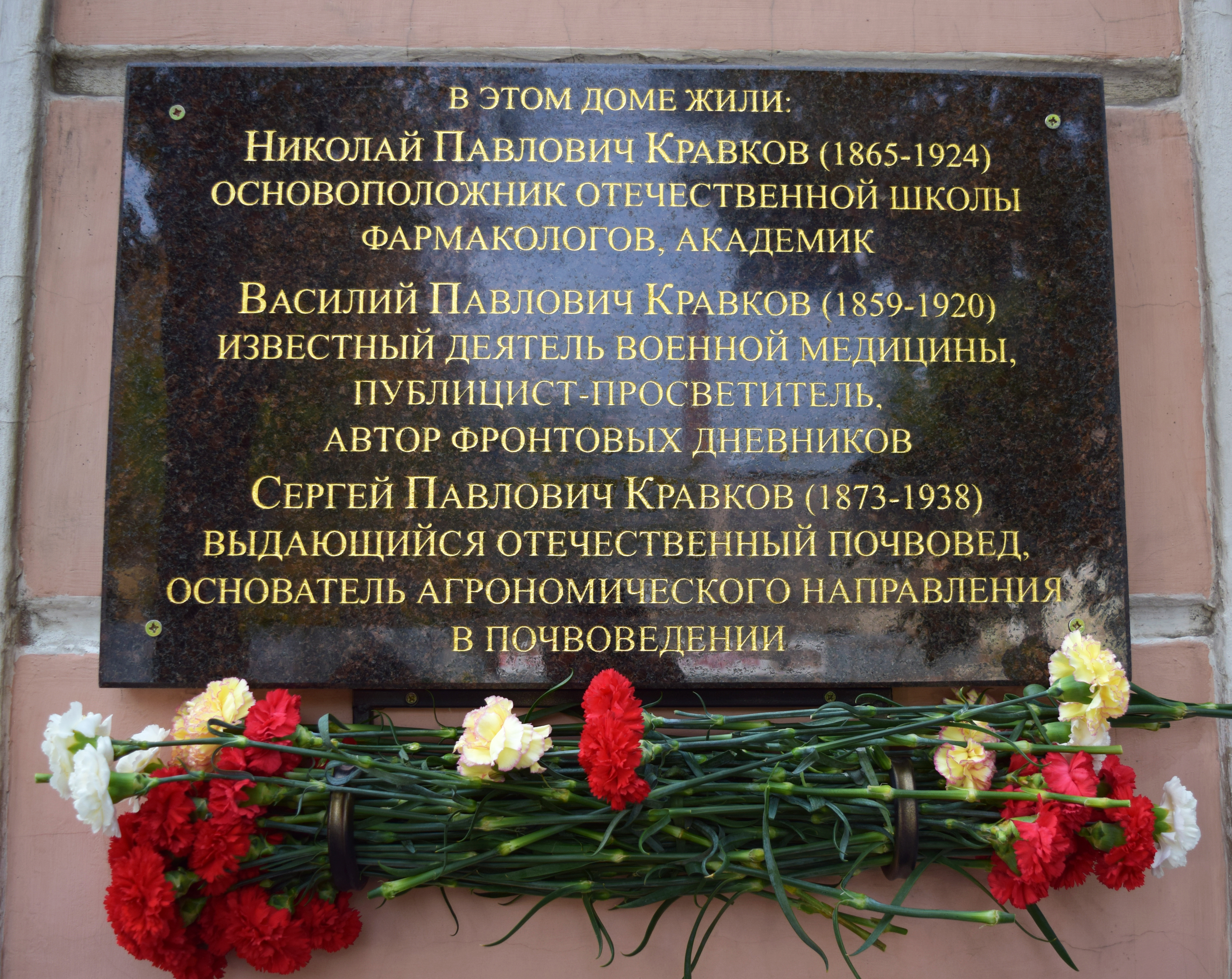
New plaque on house in Ryazan's ulitsa Lenina (former Astrakhanskaya) (since 2016)

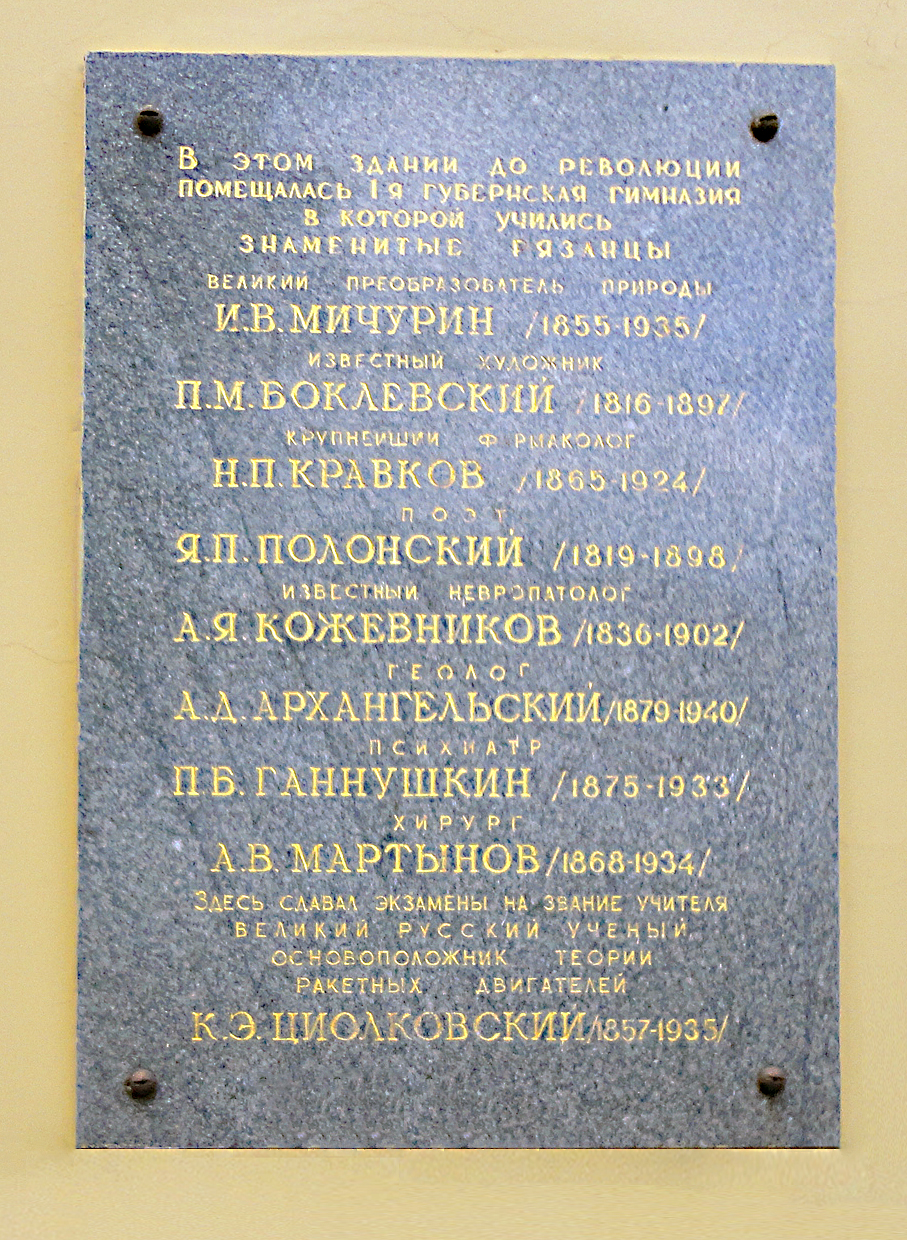
Nikolai Kravkov's name on a plaque on the former First Ryazan Gimnasium building

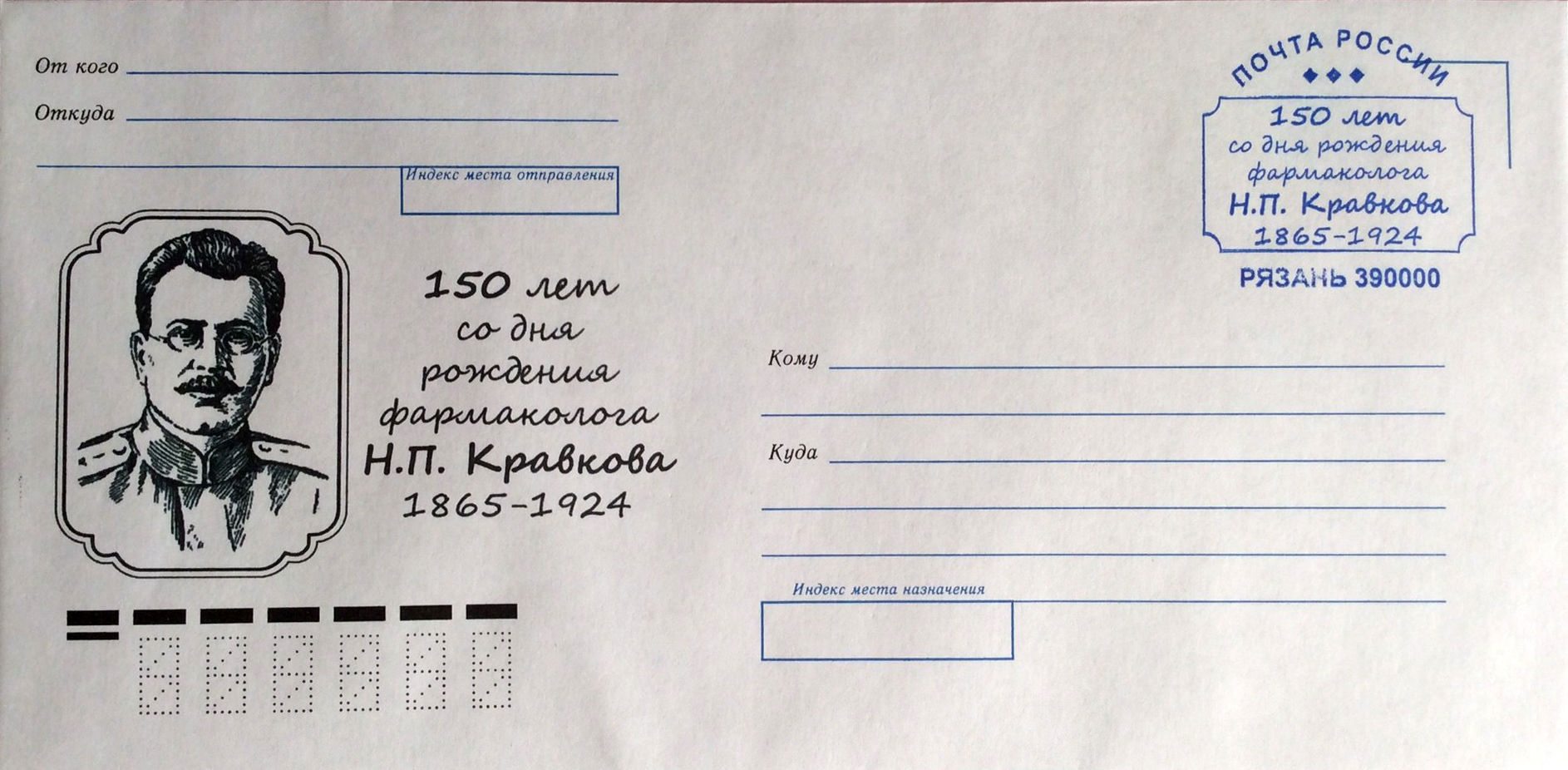
Russian Post mail cover dedicated to Nikolai Kravkov's Sesquicentennial (2015)

== Selected bibliography (German) ==
- Kravkov N. Zur Frage vom Glykogen der Pilze) // Scripta botanica. – 1889. – vol. 2.
- Kravkov N. Über die qualitative Zusammensetzung des Harns und der Epidermis веi Psoriasis universalis / N. Kravkov // St. Petersburg. Med. Wissensch. – 1891. – No. 9.
- Kravkov N. Neues über die Amyloidsubstanz / N. Kravkov // Zbl. мed. Wissensch. – 1892. – No. 9.
- Kravkov N. Über verschiedenartige Chitine / N. Kravkov // Ztschr. Biol. – 1893. – Bd. 29.
- Kravkov N. Über Kohlenhydratgruppe im Eiweissmolecule / N. Kravkov // Arch. Physiol. – 1896. – Вd 65.
- Kravkov N. De la dégénérescence amyloide et des altérations cirrotiques experimentalement provoquees chez les animaux / N. Kravkov // Arch. мed. еxp. еt anat. pathol. – 1896. – vol.8, No. 2.
- Kravkov N. Belträge zur Chemie der Amyloidentartung / N. Kravkov // Arch. Exp. Pathol. – 1897. – Bd. 40.
- Kravkov N. Bemerkungen zur Arbeit E. Burgis “Anschauungen über die Wirkung d. Arzneigemische” / N. Kravkov // Zschr. аllg. Physiol. – 1912. – Bd. 14.
- Kravkov N. Über funktionele Eigenschaften der Blutgefasse isolierter (normaler und pathologischer) Organe von Tieren und Menschen / N. Kravkov // Ztschr. ges. exp. Med. – 1922. – Bd.27.
