= Sergey Kravkov (explorer) =

- Born: Sergey Nikolayevich Kravkov; 23 November 1894; Saint Petersburg, Russian Empire
- Died: February 1942 (aged 47); Leningrad, USSR
- Education: Sea Cadet Corps (Saint Petersburg)
- Known for: hydrographer and Arctic explorer
- Awards: Russian Empire: Order of Saint Anna 4th Class (1914)
- Scientific career
- Fields: hydrography

Sergey Nikolayevich Kravkov (Russian: Серге́й Николае́вич Кравко́в; 23 November 1894 – February 1942) was a Soviet hydrographer and Arctic explorer.

== Biography ==
Sergey Nikolayevich Kravkov was born on 23 November 1894 in Saint Petersburg into the family of a prominent Russian pharmacologist Nikolai Kravkov (1865–1924) and his wife Olga Yevstafyevna, née Bogdanovskaya (1868–1942), daughter of an outstanding Russian surgeon Yevstafi Bogdanovsky. He spent his childhood with his parents in Germany and Austria-Hungary, and after their separation in 1898 lived with his mother in Odessa.

In 1909–1914 Kravkov studied at the Sea Cadet Corps in Saint Petersburg. After graduation he was made a midshipman.

During World War I Kravkov served in the Black Sea Fleet. In the battle of Cape Sarych on 18 November 1914 against German battlecruiser SMS Goeben and light cruiser SMS Breslau he adjusted the artillery fire of the battleship Tri Sviatitelia. During the battle Kravkov made sketches in water color, published in the magazine Morskoi sbornik (issue no 11 of 1915).

In 1917 Lieutenant Kravkov completed navigation courses in Sevastopol and obtained the rank of Navigator First Class. In 1918 he was transferred to the Odessa Hydrographic Department. In November 1919 he set out from Odessa to Vladivostok on the transport ship Iyerusalim. In Vladivostok he sided with the Red Army. During the Japanese intervention in Siberia he went underground.

In October 1922 Kravkov was appointed Flag Officer Navigator at the Far East Navy Headquarters. Following its reorganization in 1923 he was sent to Omsk to the Board of Security of Navigation in the Kara Sea (Ubekosibir).

In 1923–1926 Kravkov explored the polar seas as part of the Ubekosibir expeditions. In 1930 he obtained a diploma as a deep sea navigator. In 1930–1932 he carried out hydrographic work in the Taz Estuary and the Gulf of Ob. He made sketches for the first pilot chart of the Gulf of Ob.

After 1932 Kravkov specializined in astronomic work on the Northern Sea Route. His astronomical points in the Minina Skerries, Gydanskaya Guba, and on the East Siberian Sea coast long formed the basis of the maps of those areas.

In the intervals between his navigation work Sergey Kravkov taught a shipbuilding course at the Omsk Water College. He was also in charge of a hydrometric station on the Irtysh waterway.

During supervision of the delta of the Lena in winter 1940 Kravkov had his feet and hands severely frostbitten. He was sent to Tiksi settlement hospital. The doctors saved his life, but his hands and feet had to be amputated.

Being an invalid, Sergey Kravkov moved to Leningrad where his mother and sister lived. From April to October 1941 he worked in the archives of the Hydrographic Department of the Chief Directorate of the Northern Sea Route (Glavsevmorput). Kravkov refused to be evacuated from besieged Leningrad, hoping for its early liberation. He died of malnutrition, together with his mother and sister. in February 1942. Kravkov and his relatives were buried in the Serafimovskoye Cemetery, although the exact location of their grave is unknown.

== Honours ==
Kravkov's name was given to one of the biggest of the Mona Islands in the Kara Sea. This name was given to the island in 1933 by the Soviet hydrographer Vsevolod Vorobyev who first measured its exact position.

In 1974 a hydrographic vessel ordered by the USSR was launched in Finland. Named Sergey Kravkov, it is currently owned by the Russian Ministry of Transport's Federal State Unitary Enterprise Gidrograficheskoye predpriyatiye. The vessel's port of registration is Arkhangelsk.

=== Awards ===
Russian Empire:

- Order of Saint Anna 4th Class (1914)

== Family ==
In 1920 Sergey Kravkov married Antonina Aleksandrovna Charayeva, a widow. The family had three stepchildren.

== See also ==
- Russian Hydrographic Service

== Selected bibliography (Russian) ==
- Бой 5-го ноября 1914 года у мыса Сарыч ( по рассказам участников и опубликованным данным) // Морской сборник. – 1915. – №11. – С. 1-5.
- Кравков С.Н. Определение секстантом азимута земного предмета / С.Н. Кравков // Северный морской путь: сб. статей по гидрографии и мореплаванию. – Л.: Изд-во Главсевморпути, 1937. – Т.6. – С. 11-20.
