= Vasily Kravkov =

Imperial Russian Army medical officer, Privy Councilor, and author (1859–1920)

- Born: Vasily Pavlovich Kravkov; 3 March [O.S. 20 February] 1859; Ryazan, Russian Empire
- Died: 13 July 1920 (aged 61); Moscow, RSFSR
- Education: Imperial Military Medical Academy
- Known for: author of diaries of the Russo-Japanese War and World War I
- Awards: Order of Saint Stanislaus 3rd Class (1888); Order of St. Anna 3rd Class (1895); Order of Saint Stanislaus 2d Class (1899); Order of St. Anna 2d Class (1903, since 1904 with Swords); Order of St. Vladimir 4th Class with Swords and Ribbon (1904); Order of St. Vladimir 3rd Class with Swords (1905); Order of Saint Stanislaus 1st Class (1915); Order of St. Anna 1st Class (1915, since 1917 with Swords)
- Scientific career
- Fields: military medicine

Signature
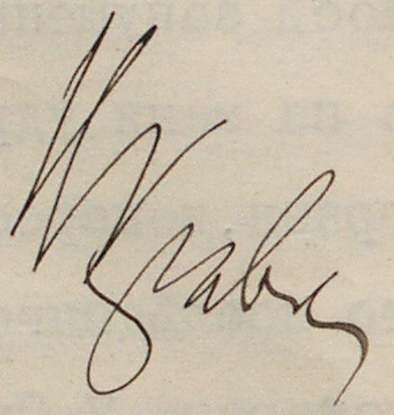

Vasily Pavlovich Kravkov (Russian: Василий Павлович Кравков; 4 March [O.S. 20 February] 1859 – 13 July 1920) was an Imperial Russian Army medical officer, Privy Councilor (1917), and author of diaries of the Russo-Japanese War and World War I.

== Biography ==
Vasily Pavlovich Kravkov was born a fourth child in the family of a non-commissioned officer Pavel Alexeyevich Kravkov (1826–1910), who served as a senior clerk in the office of the Chief Enlistment Officer of the Ryazan Governorate. According to the family legend, the scientist's mother Evdokia (Avdotia) Ivanovna (1834–1891), before wedding a "Kaluga petty bourgeois", was an illegitimate daughter of Konstantin Kavelin (1818–1885), a famous Russian historian, jurist and sociologist, one of the ideologists of Russian liberalism at the age of the reforms of Alexander II.

From 1871 to 1878, Kravkov attended the First Ryazan Gymnasium. In summer 1878 he left it with a silver medal and was admitted to the Imperial Military Medical Academy in Saint Petersburg, where he studied from 1878 to 1883.

In November 1883, Kravkov joined military service as a junior physician of the 26th Mogilevsky Infantry Regiment, then at the end of the year was transferred to the 159th Guriysky Infantry Regiment. From 1884 to 1885 he was attached to the Orenburg Military Hospital.

In 1886, Kravkov was attached to the Orenburg Local Battalion where he served as a senior physician since 1887. Since February 1888 he served at the Kazan Military Hospital as a hospital physician.

In February 1888, Kravkov received a rank of Titular Councilor (IX grade of the Table of Ranks) with precedence since 1883, in May 1888 for long service he was promoted to Collegiate Assessor (VIII grade of the Table of Ranks) with precedence since 1886. In 1888 he also passed successfully the exams for the degree of the Doctor of Medicine at the Imperial Kazan University.

In 1889 Kravkov was sent to the Imperial Military Medical Academy for "improvement in sciences". By the decree of the Academic Conference of 11 February 1891 Collegiate Assessor Kravkov, a senior physician of the 11th "Fanagoriysky" Grenadiers Regiment, was awarded with the degree of Doctor of Medicine. In March 1891 he was promoted to Court Councilor (VII grade of the Table of Ranks).

In subsequent years Kravkov held posts of senior physician of the 137th Nezhinsky Infantry Regiment (1892–1895), of the Bryansk Local Arsenal (1895–1896), of the 138th Bolkhovsky Infantry Regiment (1896–1899). From 1899 to 1900 he was a senior physician of the Compounded Field Hospital of the 1st Brigade of the 35th Infantry Division of the XVII Army Corps in Ryazan. In 1901 he was promoted to State Councilor (V grade of the Table of Ranks).

From 1904 to 1905, Kravkov participated in the Russo-Japanese War. At the Battle of Liaoyang he worked for several days under the enemy fire. In 1906 he was promoted to Actual State Councilor (IV grade of the Table of Ranks).

From 1906 to 1908, Kravkov served in Moscow as a Corps physician, From 1908 to 1910, he was a physician of the 53rd and later 62nd Infantry Reserve Brigade in Yaroslavl. In 1910 he was transferred to the post of the XXV Army Corps physician and returned to Moscow.

From 1914 to 1917, Kravkov participated in World War I. In August–September 1914 in the XXV Army Corps (5th Army, Southwestern front) he took part in the Battle of Galicia, since September 1914 to December 1915 was the Cheef Assistant of the 10th Army Sanitary Department (Northwestern, later Western front), in December 1915 he was appointed XXXVII Army Corps doctor (12th Army, Northern front). Since April 1916 Vasily Kravkov served as a VII Siberian Army Corps doctor. In May 1917 he was promoted to Privy Councilor (III grade of the Table of Ranks) by the Provisional Government. In July 1917 he retired from the army and returned to Moscow.

During the first years of the Soviet power Vasily Kravkov took part in the organization of the army medical bodies of the Russian Soviet Federative Socialist Republic. In October 1918 under his guidance an ambulatory care clinic of the Administration of Affairs of the Revolutionary Military Council of the Republic (Revvoyensoviet) was set up. He was in charge of it up to the autumn of 1919. Later he kept on cooperating with Red Army medical bodies.

5 July 1920 Vasily Kravkov was arrested by the VcheKa accused of abuses in the registration of dismissals from the military conscription. 13 July 1920 he was sentenced to capital punishment by the Presidium of the VCheKa.

== Heritage ==
Vasily Kravkov's diary. 1914

From 1880 to 1900, Kravkov published a number of works on certain problems of practical medicine. In 1910 in Yaroslavl his book Zaraznye faktory ludskogo zlopoluchiya (Infectious factors of human affliction) dedicated to the problems of health work and environment was issued.

Kravkov's war diaries are the most important part of his heritage from historic point of view. He left notes of the periods from 1904 to 1906 and 1914 to 1917. In 1919 Kravkov donated his manuscripts to the Rumyantsev Museum in Moscow, now they are kept in the Department of personal funds of the Russian State Library.

An important fragment of his diary of the Russo-Japanese War dealing with the Battle of Liaoyang (1904) was published in the Vremya i sudby almanac (1991). In 2014 appeared the first Russian edition of the abbreviated Kravkov's diary of World War I period.

== Memory ==
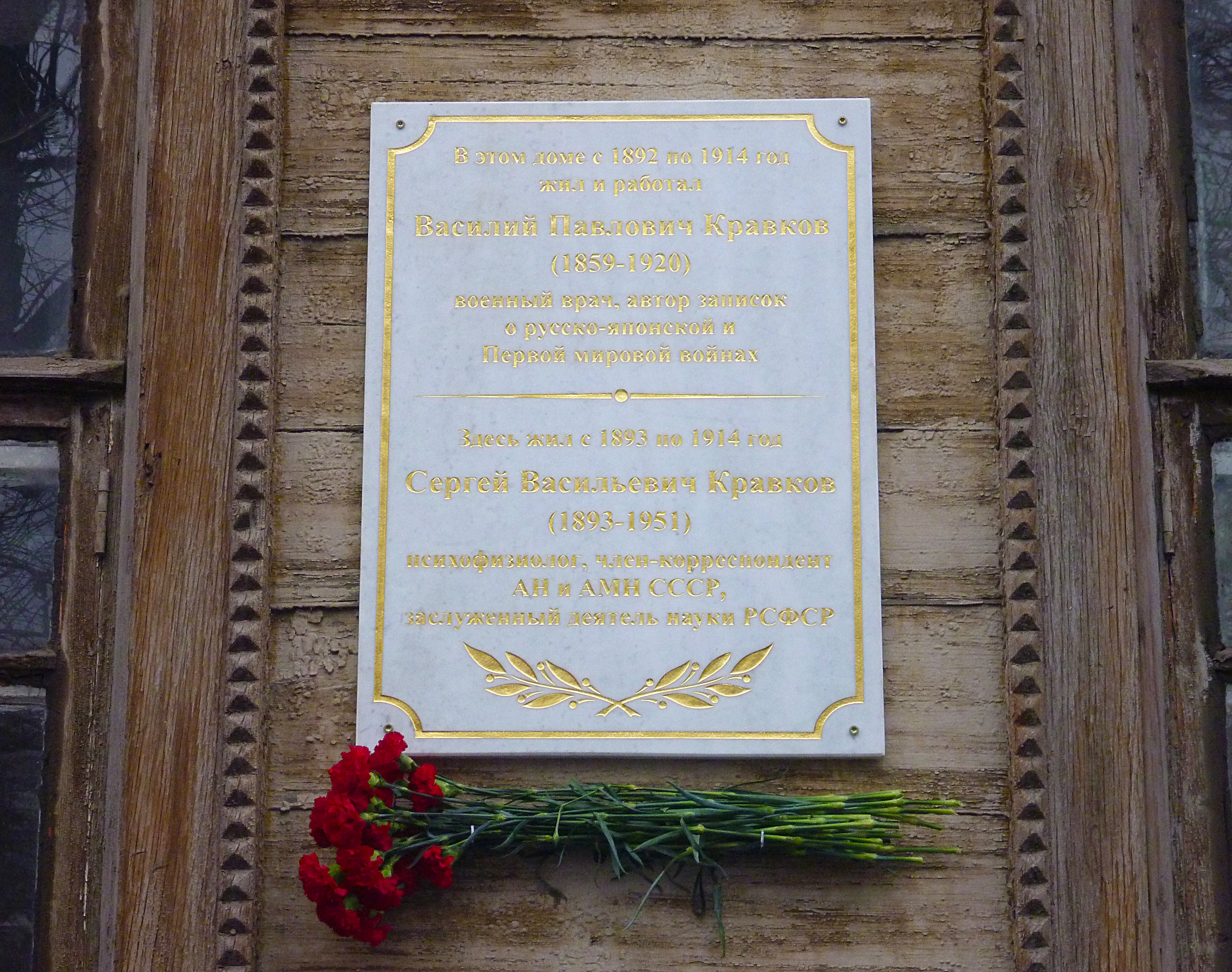
Vasily and Sergey Kravkovs plaque in Ryazan's ulitsa Saltykova-Shchedrina

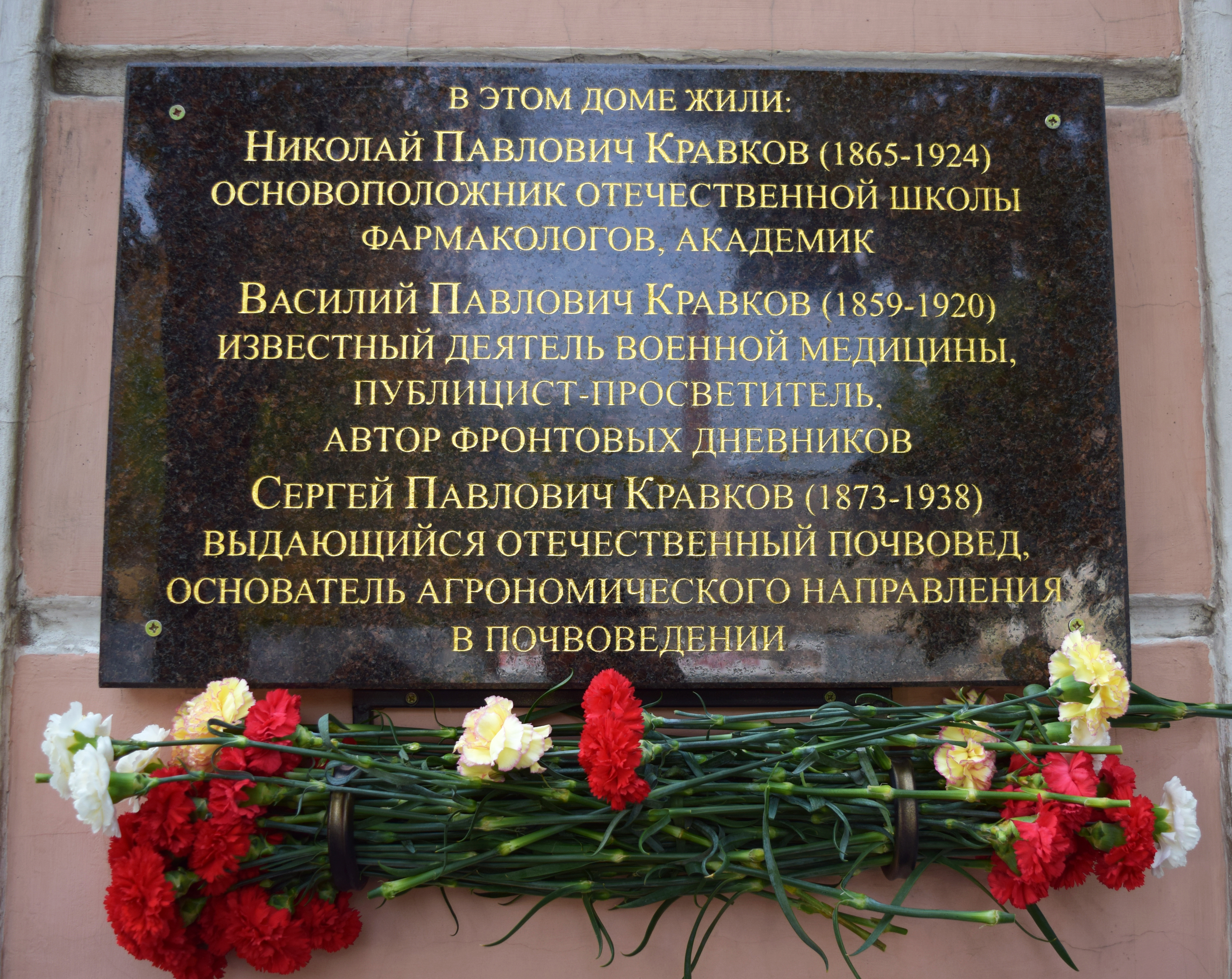
Plaque on house in Ryazan's ulitsa Lenina (former Astrakhanskaya)

== Awards ==
- Order of St. Stanislaus 3rd Class (1888)
- Order of Saint Anna 3rd Class (1895)
- Order of St. Stanislaus 2d Class (1899)
- Order of Saint Anna 2d Class (1903, since 1904 with Swords)
- Order of Saint Vladimir 4th Class with Swords and Ribbon (1904)
- Order of Saint Vladimir 3rd Class with Swords (1905)
- Order of St. Stanislaus 1st Class (1915)
- Order of Saint Anna 1st Class (1915, since 1917 with Swords)

== Family ==
In 1892 Vasily Kravkov married Elena Alexeyevna Lukina (1870 – c. 1922), from the family of hereditary gentry of Ryazan Governorate. His son Sergey Vasilyevich Kravkov (1893-1951) was a Soviet psychologist and psychophysiologist. His daughter was Elizaveta Vasilyevna Kravkova (1895-1972).

Vasily Kravkov's brother was Nikolai Kravkov (1865-1924), a prominent Russian pharmacologist. His another brother was Sergey Pavlovich Kravkov (1873-1938), Professor of Saint Petersburg University, one of the first Russian soil scientists.

His nephew was Maximilian Alexeyevich Kravkov (1887-1937), a Soviet Siberian writer.

== Works (Russian) ==
- Кравков В.П. К вопросу об участии лимфатических желёз и костного мозга в острой малярийной инфекции / В.П. Кравков // Русская медицина. – 1885. – №45. – С. 782–784.
- Кравков В.П. Чего нужно ожидать от прогресса оперативной хирургии в деле экстракции зубов / В.П. Кравков // Зубоврачебный вестник. – 1886. – №10. – С. 36-37.
- Кравков В.П. Предварительные сообщение о желудочном пищеварении при болезни почек / В.П. Кравков // Больничная газета Боткина. – 1890. – №30.
- Кравков В.П. К вопросу о деятельности желудка в течении затяжных заболеваний почек: дис.... д-ра медицины / В.П. Кравков. – СПб, 1891.
- Кравков В.П. К казуистике малярийных нефритов / В.П. Кравков // Больничная газета Боткина. – 1894. – №45.
- Кравков В.П. Фибринозная пневмония в войсках рязанского гарнизона за минувшую зиму и весну / В.П. Кравков // Военно – медицинский журнал. – 1894. – №1. – С. 12-14.
- Кравков В.П. Случай гнойного воспаления печени на почве малярийного заболевания / В.П. Кравков // Медицинское обозрение. – 1894. – № 9. – С. 324-325.
- Кравков В.П. О результатах кожного втирания гваякола и креозота у лихорадящих больных / В.П. Кравков // Врач. – 1894. – №16. – С. 541-543.
- Кравков В.П. К вопросу о реабилитации военно-санитарного строя / В.П. Кравков // Русский инвалид. – 1903. – №105. – С.1063-1065.
- Кравков В.П. Заразные факторы людского злополучия и рациональные нормы практической постановки мер личной, общественной и правительственной борьбы с ними /В.П. Кравков. – Ярославль, 1910. – 500 с.
- Кравков В.П. Записки о семейной жизни: 1907-1914. / В.П. Кравков - М.: Книга по требованию, 2014. - 122 с. - ISBN 978-5-5189-6683-3.
- Кравков В.П. Великая война без ретуши. Записки корпусного врача / В.П. Кравков. - М.: Вече, 2014 - 416 с. - ISBN 978-5-4444-2223-6.
