= Sergey Kravkov (psychologist) =

- Born: Sergey Vasilyevich Kravkov; 31 May 1893; Ryazan, Russian Empire
- Died: 16 March 1951 (aged 57); Moscow, USSR
- Education: Imperial Moscow University
- Known for: one of the founders of physiological optics
- Awards: Honoured Scientist of the RSFSR
- Scientific career
- Fields: psychology

Signature
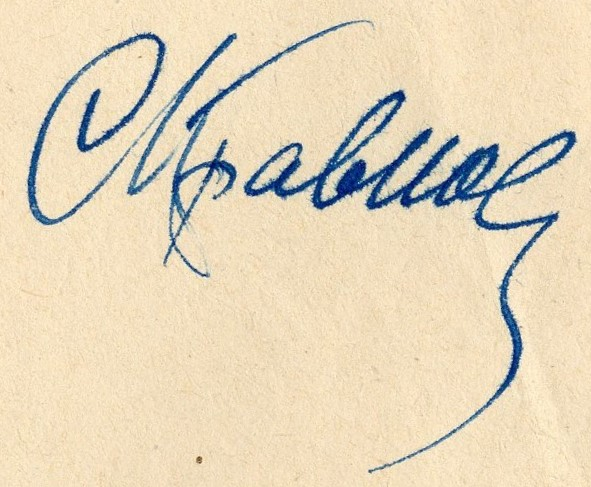

Sergey Vasilyevich Kravkov (Russian: Сергéй Васи́льевич Кравко́в; 31 May 1893 – 16 March 1951) was a Russian psychologist and psychophysiologist, Doctor of Science in Biology (1935), Corresponding Member of the Academy of Science of the USSR and the Academy of Medical Science of the USSR (1946). He is considered one of the founders of physiological optics, a scientific discipline that studies physiological processes, physical and psychic regularities which characterize the functioning of the organs of human vision.

== Biography ==
Kravkov was born 31 May 1893 in Ryazan in the family of Vasily Pavlovich Kravkov (1859–1920), an army medical officer. At the time of his birth his father held a rank of a Court Councilor (VII grade of the Table of Ranks) and served as a senior physician in the 137th "Nezhinsky" Infantry Regiment based in Ryazan. The future scientist's mother, Elena Alexeyevna, née Lukina (1870 – c. 1922) came of a family of hereditary gentry in the Ryazan Governorate.

From 1903 to 1911 Kravkov attended the First Ryazan Gimnasium. After leaving it, the future scientist was admitted to the Imperial Moscow University, where he studied at the Faculty of History and Philology. From 1912 Kravkov was also a student at the Lydia Schukina Psychology Institute attached to Moscow University and from 1915 worked there as an assistant. The beginning of Kravkov's scientific activity is considered to be his report Objective psychology, its subject and significance, presented to the annual session of the Psychology Institute. The young scientist's abilities were highly appreciated by the institute's Director, Professor Chelpanov.

In 1916, Kravkov graduated from the university magna cum laude with a qualification in experimental psychology. He was left at the university's Psychology Chair to be prepared for the professor's rank.

Working at the Psychology Institute (up to 1923) from 1920 to 1932, Kravkov was also a senior assistant of the Institute of Biological Physics of the People's Commissariat for Health of the RSFSR, where he worked under the guidance of academician Pyotr Lazarev. Those years he studied physics and mathematics and also started his own experimental research of physiology of the eyesight. Kravkov carried out an active pedagogical work in Moscow higher institutions: from 1924 to 1929 he was a senior lecturer at the Higher Art and Technical Studios (Vkhutemas), teaching colorimetry, since 1927 he had been associated professor on physiological optics at the Light Technical Department of the Moscow Energy Institute. In 1932 the scientist became professor of physiological optics of the Moscow Energy Institute. In addition to that since 1920 Kravkov had carried on pedagogical and research work in a number of Moscow higher institutions — the Military Pedagogical Academy, the Moscow Plekhanov Institute of People's Economy, the State Academy of Arts, the All-Union Electrical Engineering Institute, etc.

In 1935, on the basis of a career of published works, Kravkov was awarded a scientific rank of Doctor of Science in Biology with the qualification in psychophysiology of the eyesight. From 1935 to 1938 he was professor of physiology chair of the biological faculty of the Moscow State University.

Since 1936 Kravkov had headed the Laboratory of Physiological Optics at the State Central Helmholtz Institute of Ophthalmology (now the Moscow Helmholtz Scientific Research Institute of Eye Diseases), created by him and laternamed after him. At the same time Kravkov headed the Laboratory of Perception Psychophysiology at the Psychology Institute of the Academy of Pedagogical Science.

During World War II Kravkov worked in a neurosurgical hospital at the problems of rehabilitation of the eyesight. Since 1945 he had created and had been in charge of the Laboratory of Physiological Optics at the Philosophy Institute of the Academy of Sciences of the USSR. From 1946 to 1951 he was professor of philosophy faculty of the Moscow State University.

Kravkov was an Academic Secretary (since 1943) and Vice Chairman of the Commission on Physiological Optics at the Biological Department at the Academy of Sciences of the USSR. He was also a member of the commission on lightning engineering at the Department of Technical Sciences at the Academy of Sciences of the USSR (1947–1951).

In 1946 Kravkov was elected corresponding member of the Academy of Medical Sciences of the USSR and Corresponding Member of the Academy of Sciences of the USSR. In 1947 he was given a title of Honoured Scientist of the RSFSR.

On the initiative of the academician Mikhail Averbakh in 1941 an issue of a specialized periodical publication Problemy fisiologicheskoi optiki (Problems of physiological optics) was launched. From 1941 to 1951 Kravkov was its permanent editor.

During the decades of academic activity, Kravkov became the author of more than one hundred scientific works. The main of them are Samonablyudeniye (Self-observation, 1922), Vnusheniye (psikhologiya i pedagogika vnusheniya) (Suggestion, its psychology and pedagogics, 1924), Ocherk psikhologii (Essay on psychology, 1925), Glaz i ego rabota (Eye and its functions, 1932), Ocherk obschey psikhofiziologii organov chuvstv (Essay on general psychophysiology of sense organs, 1946) Vzaimodeystviye organov chuvstv (Interaction of sense organs, 1948), Tsvetovoe zreniye (Colour eyesight, 1951). In cooperation with N. Vishnevsky, Kravkov designed and constructed a special device for definition of the normality of twilight vision, that was being mass-produced for the Red Army needs during the Great Patriotic War. Kravkov brought up a number of prominent Soviet scientists.

Kravkov died 16 March 1951 in Moscow and was buried at the Danilovskoye Cemetery.

== Scientific activity ==
Kravkov's scientific activity went on from 1916 up to 1951. It can be divided into four periods: the first one, of early creative activity (1916–1930), that took place in difficult conditions of postrevolutionary coming into being of Soviet psychology; the second one (1930–1941), mainly connected to investigations in the field of interaction of sense organs; the third one (1941–1945), chiefly directed to the solution of tasks connected with the country's defense during World War II; the fourth one (1945–1951), that coincides with the scientist's work at the Psychology Institute of the Academy of Pedagogical Science, at the State Central Helmholtz Institute of Ophthalmology, at the Psychology Sector of the Philosophy Institute of the Academy of Science of the USSR, where Kravkov kept on an extending research of the interaction of the senses organs and problems of colour eyesight.

For this period Kravkov published more than one hundred original research works. Many of them were translated and published in Canada, China, France, Germany, Japan, UK, US. Kravkov's monograph Glaz i ego rabota (Eye and its functions) was considered the best combined work on psychophysiology of the eyesight. It had four editions in the USSR and was translated in a number of foreign countries.

Kravkov's wide range of scientific interests included: adaptation and interaction of the senses organs, contrast, successive images, synesthesia, bioelectricity of different levels of visual system (retina, cerebral subcortex and cortex), interaction of macular and peripheral spheres of the retina, induction of retina, electrophysiology of the eyesight (electric sensibility of the eye, lability, electroretinogram), colour eyesight and its anomalies, sensorial classical conditioning, glaucoma diagnosis methods (by colour sensation and by the reaction of a blind spot) and many other items.

Kravkov is one of the founders of physiological optics, a scientific discipline representing a synthesis of knowledge about physiological, psychical and psychological regularities that characterize the function of the eyesight organ. He studied the regularities of the functioning of the vision system, central regulation of vision functions, interaction of senses organs, electrophysiology of vision, investigated colour vision and the hygienics of lightning.

Numerous experiments carried out by Kravkov, his disciples and colleagues, helped to find out functional ties between colour vision systems, between the sensitivity to red and green colours, and to understand antagonistic relation between them. The same functional dependence was found out in the sensitivity to yellow and blue colours. A relation of assistance between green and blue sensitive systems was discovered.

In the years of World War II the themes of Kravkov's researches were linked to the practical needs of the Red Army: he dealt with the problems of observation efficiency, improvement of camouflage, reconnaissance, worked out methods to oppose the eye dazzling by searchlights, methods to fight against snow blinding and the senses organs hypersensitivity.

== Family ==
Since 1920 Kravkov was married to Nina Kolosova (1894–1985), daughter of archpriest Pavel Kolosov (c. 1853–1923), bishop of Yelisavetgrad from 1921 to 1923. She was a pianist, later lecturer of the Moscow State Tchaikovsky Conservatory. Their son Yuriy Kravkov (1921–2003), Major General of Medical Service, directed the Nikolai Burdenko Main Military Clinical Hospital from 1973 to 1983.

== Memory ==
By the order of the Minister of Health Care of the RSFSR Maria Kovrigina # 616 of November 28, 1951, the Department of Physiological Optics of the State Central Helmholtz Institute of Ophthalmology was named after Kravkov. Nowadays the Kravkov Laboratory of Clinic Vision Physiology is one of the structural branches of the Moscow Helmholtz Scientific Research Institute of Eye Diseases.

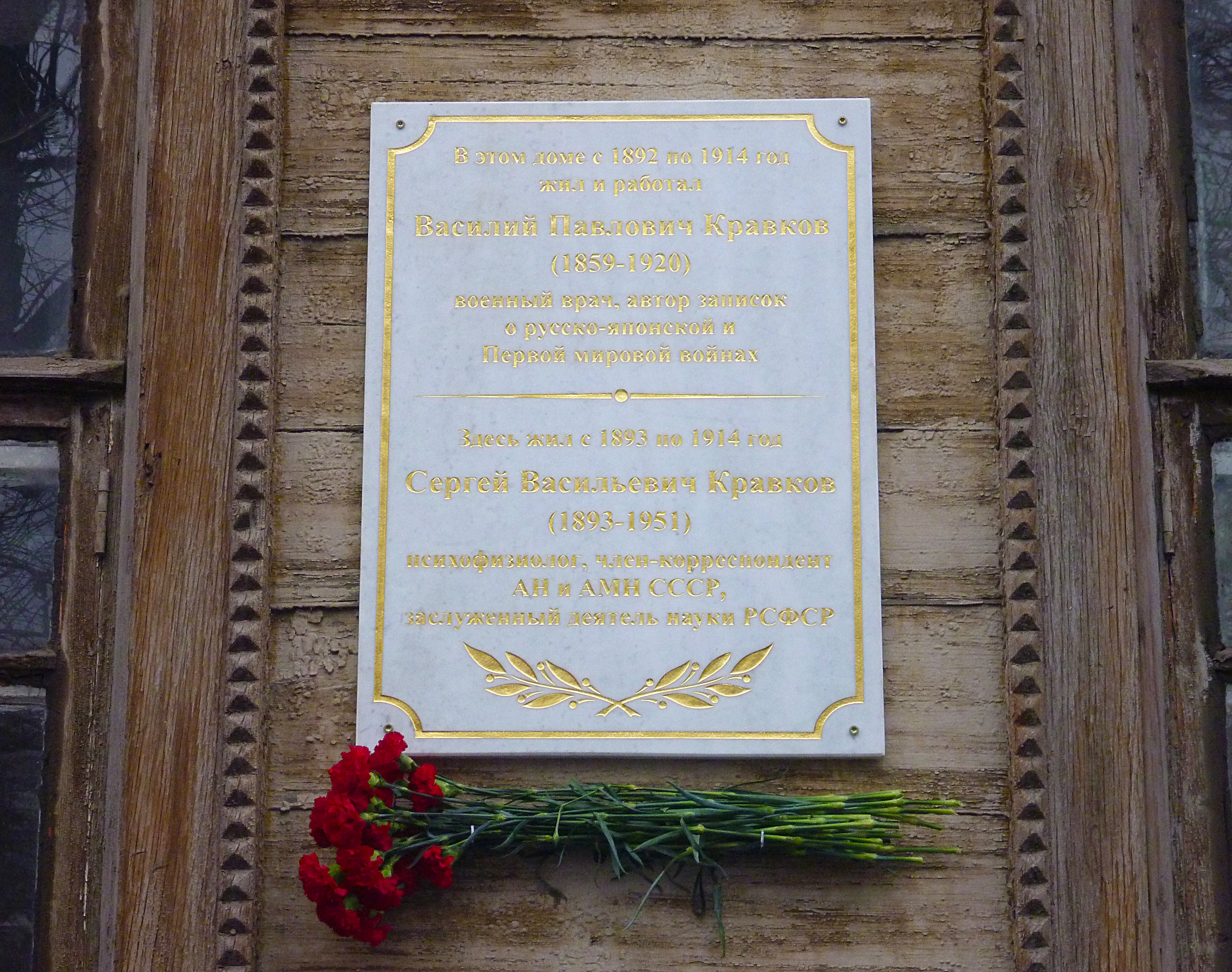
Vasily and Sergey Kravkovs plaque in Ryazan's ulitsa Saltykova-Shchedrina

== Selected bibliography (English, German, French) ==
- Kravkov, S. W. "Über die Helligkeits und Adaptationskurven der total Farbenblinden" / Albrecht Von Græfes Archiv für Ophthalmologie, vol. 118, issue 2, 25. Februar, 1927, pp. 285–29
- Kravkov S. V. "Über die Richtung der Farbentransformation" / Psychologische Forschung, 10 (1928), pp. 20–31
- Kravkov S. V., Paulsen-Bashmakova V. A. "Über die kontrasterregende Wirkung der transformierten Farben" / Psychologische Forschung, 12 (1929), pp. 88–93
- Kravkov S. W. "Über eine zentrale Beeinflussung der Sehschärfe" / Albrecht Von Græfes Archiv für Ophthalmologie, vol. 124, issue 1, 29. April 1930, pp. 76–86
- Kravkov, S. W. "Über die Abhängigkeit der Sehschärfe vom Schallreiz" / Albrecht Von Græfes Archiv für Ophthalmologie, vol. 124, issue 2, May 1930. pp. 334–338
- Kravkov, S. W. "Die Unterschiedsempfindlichkeit der Netzhautperipherie beim Dämmerungssehen" / Albrecht Von Græfes Archiv für Ophthalmologie, vol. 127, issue 1, 23. September 1931, pp. 86–99
- Kravkov S. W. "Über die Beeinflussung der Unterschiedsempfindlichkeit des Auges durch Nebenreize" / Albrecht Von Græfes Archiv für Ophthalmologie, vol. 128, issue 1, 22. Februar 1932, pp. 105–111
- Kravkov, S. W. "Über die Beeinflussung der Unterschiedsempfindlichkeit des Auges durch Nebenreize" / Albrecht Von Græfes Archiv für Ophthalmologie, vol. 129, issue 2, 24. November 1932, p. 298
- Kravkov S. V. "Über ein Grundgesetz der Farbentransformation" / Psychologische Forschung, 16 (1932), pp. 160–165
- Kravkov S. W. "Der Lichtirradiationseffekt im Auge in seiner Abhängigkeit von den Gesichts-, Gehörs- und Geruchsnebenreizen" / Albrecht Von Græfes Archiv für Ophthalmologie, vol. 129, issue 3, 21. Januar 1933, pp. 440–451
- Kravkov S. W., Semenovskaja E. N. "Steigerung der Lichtempfindlichkeit des Auges durch vorangehende Lichtreize" / Albrecht Von Græfes Archiv für Ophthalmologie, vol. 139, issue 4, 22. September 1933, pp. 513–526
- Kravkov S. W. "Sehschärfe und Beleuchtung beim Unterscheiden weißer Objekte auf schwarzem Grunde" / Albrecht Von Græfes Archiv für Ophthalmologie, vol. 131, issue 3, 20. Dezember 1933, pp. 452–457
- Kravkov, S. W., Semenovskaja E. N. "Zur Frage der Abhängigkeit der Sehfunktion vom längeren Hungern" / Albrecht Von Græfes Archiv für Ophthalmologie, vol. 132, issue 4, 8. August 1934. pp. 370–371
- Kravkov, S. W. "Die Unterschiedsempfindlichkeit eines Auges unter dem Einfluß vom Schall oder Beleuchtung des anderen Auges" / Albrecht Von Græfes Archiv für Ophthalmologie, vol. 132, issue 4, 8. August 1934, pp. 421–429
- Kravkov, S. W., Belitzky G. S. "Die Abhängigkeit des Lichtirradiationseffektes im Auge von der Lichtintensität, Kontrast und Nebenreizwirkung" / Albrecht Von Græfes Archiv für Ophthalmologie, vol. 132, issue 4, 8. August, 1934, pp. 379–398
- Kravkov S. V. "Changes of visual acuity in one eye under the influence of the illumination of the other or of acoustic stimuli" / Journal for experimental psychology. Vol. 12, No 6, December 1934, pp. 805–812
- Kravkov S. V. "Action des excitations auditives sur la fréquence critique des papillotements lumineux" / Acta Ophthalmologica, Volume 13, Issue 3–4, September 1935, pp. 260–272
- Kravkov S. V. "The influence of sound upon the light and color sensibility of the eye" / Acta Ophthalmologica, Volume 14, Issue 3–4, June 1936, pp. 348–360
- Kravkov S.V. "Effect of indirect light stimulation as a function of the intensity of a direct stimulus" / Acta Ophthalmologica, 1937, Volume 15, Issue 1, March 1937, pp. 96–103
- Kravkov S. V. "The influence of acoustic stimulation upon the colour sensibility of a protanopic eye" /Аcta Ophthalmologica, Volume 15, Issue 3, October 1937, pp. 337–342
- Kravkov S. V. "The influence of the dark adaptation on the critical frequency of flicker for monochromatic lights" / Acta Ophthalmologica, Volume 16, Issue 2–3, September 1938, pp. 375–384
- Kravkov S. V. "Illumination and visual acuity" / Acta Ophthalmologicа, Volume 16, Issue 2–3, September 1938, pp. 385–395
- Kravkov S. V. "The influence of the loudness of the indirect sound stimulus on the color sensitivity of the eye" / Acta Ophthalmologica, Volume 17, Issue 3, October 1939, pp. 324–331
- Kravkov S.V. "The influence of odors upon color vision" / Acta Ophthalmologica, Volume 17, Issue 4, December 1939, pp. 426–442
- Kravkov S.V. "The influence of caffeine on the color sensitivity" / Acta Ophthalmologica, Volume 17, Issue 1, March 1939, pp. 89–94
- Kravkov S. V., Galochkina L. P. "Effect of a constant current on vision" /Journal of the Optical Society of America, Volume 37, Issue 3, 1947, pp. 181–185
- Kravkov S. V. Das Farbensehen. [Übers. aus d. Russ. von P. Klemm] Berlin: Akademie Verlag, 1955.
