= Maximilian Kravkov =

Russian writer, geologist and explorer

- Kravkov before 1925
- Born: Maximilian Alexeyevich Kravkov; 22 September 1887; Ryazan, Russian Empire
- Died: 12 October 1937 (aged 50); Novosibirsk, USSR
- Education: Saint Petersburg University
- Known for: writer and explorer of Siberia
- Scientific career
- Fields: Geology

Maximilian Alexeyevich Kravkov (Russian: Максимилиан Алексеевич Кравков; 22 September 1887 – 12 October 1937) was a Russian writer, geologist and explorer of Siberia.

== Biography ==
Maximilian Alexeyevich Kravkov was born on 10 September 1887 in Ryazan. He was a first-begotten child in the family of Alexey Pavlovich Kravkov (1857–1895), the senior doctor of the 11th «Fanagoriyskiy» Grenadiers Regiment, and his wife Antonina Ivanovna. After Alexey Kravkov's death his widow together with her younger son Leonid moved to Moscow, leaving Maximilian with relatives in Ryazan. Maximilian lived in the house of his uncle Vasily Pavlovich Kravkov (1859–1920), an army doctor. He was brought up by his aunt Elena Pavlovna Kravkova (1852–1907).

In 1898 Maximilian Kravkov moved to his mother's place in Moscow and started to attend the Fifth Moscow Gimnasium, but due to the acute condition of health of Antonina Kravkova he had to go back to Ryazan soon. In 1899-1904 Maximilian Kravkov attended the First Ryazan Gymnasium. In summer 1904 he was admitted to the Imperial Saint Petersburg University, where he studied at the Faculty of Mathematics and Physics.

Since 1904 Maximilian Kravkov closely cooperated with the Ryazan organization of the Russian Social Democratic Labour Party: kept at home a mimeographmachine, disseminated propaganda materials, in summer 1907 was engaged in propaganda efforts among the peasants of the Ryazhsk uyezd of the Ryazan Governorate. Early in 1908 Maximilian Kravkov together with students Bystrovzorov, Orlov and pharmaceutist Babkov created an autonomous fighting group with the aim to prepare an attempt upon the life of the Moscow Governor General Sergey Gershelman.

During student vacations in July 1908 Maximilian Kravkov was arrested in the house of his uncle Vasily Kravkov in Abramovskaya street in Ryazan. The search found out that there was a clandestine laboratory in the basement of the house aimed to produce explosives.

In 1909, the Moscow Military Region Court found Maximilian Kravkov guilty of “keeping explosives and bursting charges” and sentenced him to five years of solitary confinement. Two of them he spent in fetters in the Moscow Governorate's Criminal Prison (Taganka Prison).

In 1913, Maximilian Kravkov was deported to the village of Tayshet in the Kansk Region of the Krasnoyarsk uyesd of the Yeniseysk Governorate. During his exile he carried on scientific research, gathered materials for natural scientific collections of the Imperial Saint Petersburg University and the Imperial Kharkov University. In that period Maximilian Kravkov began his literary work. In 1916 his two stories were published in the “Okhotnichiy vestnik” (The Hunter's Bulletin) magazine.

Maximilian Kravkov lived in Tayshet up to the February Revolution of 1917. After the amnesty in March 1917 he joined the Union of Socialists-Revolutionaries-Maximalists, was elected a member of the Tayshet Executive Committee and was sent to the Uyesd Congress to Nizhneudinsk. There he was elected deputy for Nizhneudinsk uyesd to the Governorate's executive committee in Irkutsk, where he became a member of the Zemstvo Commission.

After the October Revolution 1917 the Zemstvo system was abolished and Maximilian Kravkov returned to his scientific work in Tayshet.

In 1918-1919 Maximilian Kravkov was a member of the restored Zemstvo of the Nizhneudinsk uyesd, a member of the Governorate's Zemstvo Commission and headed the administration of the Nizhneudinsk uyesd of the Irkutsk Governorate. Since summer 1919 he took part in the preparation of the SR uprising in Irkutsk aimed to remove Aleksandr Kolchak from power, in December 1919 he personally participated in the interception of Kolchak's special trains at the Nizhneudinsk railway station. In January 1920 Kravkov escorted to Irkutsk the “D” train, with gold reserves of Kolchak's government.

After the restoration of the Soviet power in Siberia Maximilian Kravkov was in charge of the Museum of Local Lore, History and Economy in Irkutsk. In autumn 1920 he was arrested by the VcheKa on a charge of his membership to SR-maximalists party illegal by that time. However, after he officially went out of that party the action wasn't brought against his case.

In 1920–1921, Maximilian Kravkov lived and worked in Omsk where he was appointed chief of Subdepartment of Museums in the Siberian Department of Public Education. After the Soviet institutions were moved from Omsk to Novonikolayevsk (Novosibirsk since 1926) since 1922 Maximilian Kravkov directed the Central Public Museum of Novonikolayevsk (now the Novosibirsk State Museum of Local Lore, History and Economy). He worked hard at the museum's arrangement, was responsible for Geology Section and carried on the educational work among the youth.

In November 1922 Maximilian Krvakov was arrested by the Novonikolayevsk State Political Directorate on a new suspicion of his membership to the SR party. After a month the inquest was lifted for lack of concrete data of the charge and Kravkov was set free.

In 1925 Maximilian Kravkov organized an expedition to the Salair from where he brought a number of valuable exhibits for the museum. At the end of 1920th – beginning 1930th Kravkov as a member of geological exploratory and geographic expeditions used to visit the Sayan Mountains and the lower reaches of the Yenisei River.

In March 1931 Maximilian Kravkov was arrested on a charge of his membership in a counterrevolutionary organization of the former Lieutenant General Vasily Boldyrev. But rather soon his case was lifted for lack of convincing proofs and he was set free.

In 1931-1933 Maximilian Kravkov worked as a geologist in the Mountain Shoriya. The impressions he got in the period helped him to create a number of writings about miners end explorers of the earth interior.

In May 1937 Maximilian Kravkov was arrested on a charge of his participation in the Japanese-SR Terrorist Subversive Espionage Organization. He was found guilty, sentenced to death and executed on 12 October 1937.

Maximilian Alexeyevich Kravkov was rehabilitated posthumously in 1958.

== Works ==
The first significant results of Maximilian Kravkov's efforts to popularize knowledge of Siberia were his books “Chto takoe muzei I kak ego ustroit v derevne” (What is a museum and how to organize it in a village, 1921), “Yestestvennye bogatstva Sibiri” (Natural resources of Siberia, 1928), “Programma-instruktsiya po geologicheskim izucheniyam i sboram (Programm-instruction on geological researches and collections, 1929) and his article on geology and geography works in a volume “Abakanskaya ekspeditsiya. 1927-1928” (Abakan expedition. 1927–1928), edited in 1930.

In 1922 Maximilian Kravkov started his serious literary activity. Valerian Pravdukhin, head of Siberian State Publishing House (Sibgosizdat) mentored his first steps in literature. Kravkov made his debut as a local lore specialist and essayist in the literary magazine “Sibirskiye ogni” founded in 1922, later he published his works regularly in the magazines “Krasnaya niva”, “Nashi dostizheniya”, “Kolkhoznik”, the “Pereval” almanac and siberian children's magazine “Tovarisch”.

In 1924 Maximilian Kravkov, who was also in charge of Sibkino, took an active part in the work at the “first Siberian movie” titled “The red gas” (1924), shot on Vladimir Zazubrin's writings. The movie was dedicated to the fifth anniversary of the liberation of Novonikolayevsk of Admiral Kolchak's troops.

Since the end of 1920th a number of Kravkov's novels for children and youth had been published, such as “Deti taigi” (The children of the taiga, 1929), “Za sokrovischami reki Tunguski” (Searching treasures of the Tunguska River, 1931), “God vo ldakh” (A year among the ice, 1933). His novel “Zolotaya gora” (Gold Mountain) got a wide spread and had two editions in 1934 and 1936. Its translation into Shor language was also published in 1935. In 1930 in Moscow was issued a collection of Kravkov's stories titled “Bolshaya voda” (Spring flood). His last books were the novel “Utro bolshogo dnia” (Morning of a great day, 1936) and a collection of stories “Zolotaya rossyp” (Placer gold, 1936).

The most well known of Maximilian Kravkov's works are the adventure novels “Zashifrovanny plan” (Chiphered plan) and “Assiriyskaya rukopis” (Assyrian manuscript), bonth written in 1925 and reedited in 1970 and 1977.

Siberian literary critic Nikolai Yanovsky wrote: “Maximilian Kravkov as a writer didn't create much. The best works he wrote are not numerous. But what he did, he did well, and now it is a part of our literary heritage, bright and unique in tis own way”.

== Family ==
In 1926 Maximilian Kravkov married Irina Iliodorovna Rossinskaya (1903–1982), a choreographic teacher. Their son Alexey Maximilianovich Kravkov (1927–2011) was an engineer.

Maximilian's younger brother Leonid Alexeyevich Kravkov (1889 – after 1930), captain of the 5th artillery brigade, participated in the World War I, on 10 May 1917 he was awarded with St. George Sword. In the Soviet times he worked in the system of military education.

== Bibliography (Russian, Shor, Czech, Slovak) ==
- Кравков М. А. Что такое музей и как его устроить в деревне / М.Кравков; Отд. по делам музеев при Сибнаробразе. - Омск: Сибнаробраз, 1921. - 15 с.
- Кравков М. А. Естественные богатства Сибири / М. А. Кравков. - Новосибирск : Сибкрайиздат, 1928. - 75, IV с.
- Кравков М. А. .Программа-инструкция по геологическим изучениям и сборам (В помощь сибирскому краеведу / О-во изучения Сибири и ее производительных сил. Бюро краеведения) / М. А. Кравков. - Новосибирск: Сибкрайиздат, 1929. - 43 с.
- Кравков М. А. Дети тайги: Повесть для детей среднего и старшего возраста / М. Кравков. - Новосибирск: Сибкрайиздат, 1929. - 79 с.
- Кравков М. А. Предварительные материалы геолого-географических работ Абаканской экспедиции. // В кн.: Абаканская экспедиция. 1927-1928 г. Новосибирск : Б. и., [1930]. - с. 5–18.
- Кравков М. А. Большая вода: Рассказы / М. Кравков. - Москва: Федерация, 1930. - 151 с.
- Кравков М. А. Год во льдах: [Повесть] / М. Кравков. - Новосибирск : ОГИЗ, 1933. - 108 с.
- Кравков М. А. Золотая гора: Повесть для детей старшего возраста /М. А. Кравков. - Новосибирск : Зап.-Сиб. краев. изд-во, 1934. - 92, [2] с.
- Kravkov M. Altьn taq /перевод Ф. Кусургашева; ил. А. Заборского. - Novosibirsk : OGIZ, 1935. - 60,[4] c.
- Кравков М. А. Золотая гора: Повесть для детей старшего возраста /М. Кравков. - 2-е изд. - Новосибирск: Зап.-Сиб. краев. Изд-во, 1936. - 138, [2] с.
- Кравков М. А. Утро большого дня: Повесть / М. Кравков. - Новосибирск : Зап.-Сиб. краев. изд-во, 1936. - 165, [2] с.
- Кравков М. А. Золотая россыпь: Рассказы / М. Кравков. - Новосибирск : Зап.-Сиб. краев. изд-во, 1936. - 196 с.
- M. Kravkov. V zajetí polární noci / přeložil František Bicek, ilustroval Zdeněk Burian. - Toužimský a Moravec, Praha, 1938
- M. Kravkov. V zajatí polárnej noci / preklad Pavel Halaša. - Tranoscius, Liptovský Svätý Mikuláš, 1948
- Кравков М. А. Ассирийская рукопись: Приключенческие повести и рассказы /[Вступ. статья и сост. Н.Н. Яновского; Илл. В. Колесников]. - Новосибирск: Зап.-Сиб. кн. изд-во, 1970. - 256 с.
- Кравков М. А. Зашифрованный план: Повести, рассказы / Максимилиан Кравков; [Предисл. Н. Яновского Худож. И.Д. Шуриц]. - Новосибирск: Зап.-Сиб. кн. изд-во, 1977. - 254 с.
