= Sergey Kravkov (agronomist) =

Russian agronomist

- Born: Sergey Pavlovich Kravkov; 21 June 1873; Ryazan, Russian Empire
- Died: 12 August 1938 (aged 65); Leningrad, RSFSR
- Education: Imperial Saint Petersburg University
- Known for: one of the first Russian soil scientist
- Awards: Order of St. Anna 2d Class (1915); Honoured Scientist of the RSFSR
- Scientific career
- Fields: agronomy, pedology

Sergey Pavlovich Kravkov (Russian: Сергей Павлович Кравков; 21 June 1873 – 12 August 1938) was a soil scientist and agricultural chemist. He lived in the Russian Empire and later the Soviet Union.

== Biography ==
Sergey Pavlovich Kravkov was born 21 June 1873 in Ryazan in the family of a non-commissioned officer Pavel Alexeyevich Kravkov (1826-1910), who served as a senior clerk in the office of the Chief Enlistment Officer of the Ryazan Governorate. According to the family legend, the scientist's mother Evdokia (Avdotia) Ivanovna (1834-1891), before wedding a "Kaluga petty bourgeois", was an illegitimate daughter of Konstantin Kavelin (1818-1885), a famous Russian historian, jurist and sociologist, one of the ideologists of Russian liberalism at the age of the reforms of Alexander II.

In 1882-1892 Sergey Kravkov attended the First Ryazan Gymnasium. In 1892-1896 he went on to study at the Natural Science Department of the Faculty of Mathematics and Physics of the Imperial Saint Petersburg University. The future scientist's graduation thesis "On the crop rotation" was awarded a gold medal.

After the graduation Sergey Kravkov remained at the Agronomy Chair of the Imperial Saint Petersburg University where he worked under the guidance of Professor Sovetov. In 1898 his first scientific work "K voprosu o vliyanii elektrizatsii pochvy na sovershayuschiesya v ney processy" (On the effect of electrostatic charging of soil on the processes going on in it) was published.

In 1898 Sergey Kravkov carried on geobotanical researches in the Derkul steppe in Kharkov Governorate. Their results were published in the "Trudy Volnogo ekonomicheskogo obschestva" (Works of the Free Economic Society) and the "Zemledelcheskaya gazeta" (Agricultural newspaper).

The years from 1898 to 1900 Sergey Kravkov spent in practical trainings abroad (Germany, Switzerland, France, Great Britain). After that he had headed for two years a research farm of the Agricultural Institute of Nowa Aleksandria (now Puławy in Poland). In these years the scientist gained wide practical and agronomical experience. Since 1901 Kravkov prelected general agronomics at the Professor Stebut's Agricultural Courses for Women.

The years from 1903 to 1904 Sergey Kravkov also spent abroad. He worked in Munich under the guidance of Professor Ramann, studied the products of decomposition of organic substances.

In 1904 Sergey Kravkov returned to the Imperial Saint Petersburg University, passed master's exams and was elected a privatdocent to deliver lectures on chemical and biological processes in soil.

Also in 1906-1909 Kravkov worked at the experimental forest district of Veliko-Anadol, studying the problem of drying up of forests in the steppe. In 1908 he became one of the founders of the Agricultural Institute at Kamenny Island in Saint Petersburg.

In 1908 Sergey Kravkov defended the master's thesis "Materialy po izucheniyu processov razlozheniya rastitelnykh ostatkov v pochve" (Materials on the study of the processes of decomposition of vegetal remains in soil) at the Imperial Kazan University. In 1909 he was elected associate professor of agronomy at the Imperial Saint Petersburg University. He was in charge of a compulsory course "Soil science and agrochemistry".

In 1912 Sergey Kravkov defended the Doctor's thesis "Issledovaniye v oblasti izucheniya roli mertvogo rastitelnogo pokrova v pochvakh" (Study on the role of dead plant remains in soil) at the Imperial University of Yuryev (now the Tartu University in Estonia), examining in it the processes of transformation of organic substances. He became the fourth Doctor of Agronomy in Russia. At the same time Kravkov was elected the Head of the Agronomy Chair of the Imperial Saint Petersburg University and held this position till his death in 1938.

Under Kravkov's guidance intensive experimental works on the problems of humus formation and soil chemistry were carried on. The problem of humus formation had remained the main theme of the scientist's investigations for his whole life. Kravkov was the first to pay attention to the fact that the soil is an element that is constantly gradually changing and is not in a state of fixed chemical balance. Developing the ideas of Vasily Dokuchaev, Sergey Kravkov appealed to permanent systematic studies of soil horizons, qualifying the dynamics of soil processes as "the life of soil". He organized observations of dynamics of soil processes.

After the October Revolution of 1917 Sergey Kravkov joined the preparation of agronomy staff for the needs of the economy of a new state. In 1922 the scientist was one of those who took part in the foundation of an independent Chair of Experimental Soil Science at the Petrograd State University. In 1921-1925 Kravkov headed the Department of Applied Soil Science at the North-West Regional Agricultural Experimental Station. Since 1926 he took an active part in the work of the State Institute of Experimental Agronomy.

In 1927 Sergey Kravkov was one of the members of the Soviet delegation that took part in the First International Congress of Soil Science in Washington, D.C. He also participated in the work of the Second International Congress of Soil Science that took place in Leningrad and Moscow in 1930.

When in 1932 the Kirov Higher Communist School of Agriculture was founded in Leningrad Sergey Kravkov was invited to head its Chair of General Agriculture and to deliver lectures on soil science.

In 1934 Sergey Kravkov was awarded a scientific rank of Doctor of Science in Geology. On 10 November 1934 the decision of the Presidium of the All-Russian Central Executive Committee gave him a title of Honoured Scientist of the RSFSR.

Sergey Pavlovich Kravkov died in Leningrad on 12 August 1938. He was buried at Smolenskoye Cemetery.

Kravkov's research work extended and deepenedthe scientific insight on the soil formation processes, contributed to the wide spread of the idea of dynamism of all soil phenomena. His work was continued by a number of talented disciples – the Soviet soil scientists.

== Family ==
In 1909 Sergey Kravkov married an artist Mariya Mikhailovna Buraya (1861-?). He educated a stepdaughter Mariya.

The scientist's elder brothers were Vasily Kravkov (1859-1920), army medical officer of high rank, author of memories about Russo-Japanese War and World War I, and Nikolai Kravkov (1865-1924), a prominent pharmacologist.

== Memory ==
By the resolution of the Presidium of the Supreme Soviet of the RSFSR in 1939, the Laboratory of Experimental Soil Science of the Leningrad State University was named after Sergey Pavlovich Kravkov.

== Selected bibliography (English, French, German) ==
- Kravkov S. "Recherches sur quelques-unes des propriétés physiques du terreau des steppes" /S. Kravkoff. - St. Petersbourg, s.a.
- Kravkov S. "Untersuchungen einigen physikalischen Eigenschaften der Schwarzerde in der Ursteppe" /S. Krawkow. – Sankt Petersburg, s.a.
- Kravkov S. "Recherches sur le rôle de la couche superficielle de debris de vegetaux dans la formation du sol." St. Petersbourg: impr. de M. M. Stasioulevitch, 1911
- Kravkov S. P. "Achievements of Russian science in the field of agricultural pedology." Leningrad, Office of the Academy of Sciences, of the Union of Soviet Socialist Republics. Russian pedological investigaqtions. IX, 1927 – 27 p.
- Kravkov S. P. "Producing powers of soils in the USSR" // Proceedings and papers of the Second International Congress of Soil Science (Leningrad-Moscow, USSR, July 20–31, 1930). Vol. IV. State publishing house of agricultural, cooperative and collective farm literature (Selkolkhozgis), Moscow, 1932 – pp. 145–152
- The Earth's crust. (Editor S. P. Kravkoff) Leningrad-Moscou, Editions scientifiques et techniques, 1935 – 192 p.
- Kravkov S.P. "Materials for studying decomposition processes of plant remains in soil" // Bio- and agrochemistry of soil processes. Leningrad: Nauka, 1978 – pp. 67–102
- Kravkov S.P. "Studying of the dead vegetation cover role in soil formation" // Bio- and agrochemistry of soil processes. Leningrad: Nauka, 1978 – pp. 103–127
