= Hedonal =

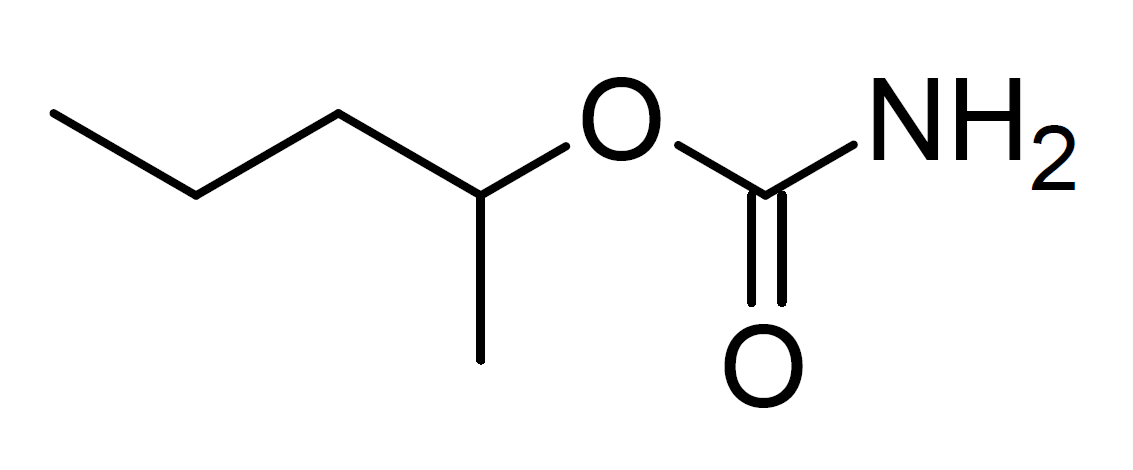

Identifiers
- IUPAC name: pentan-2-yl carbamate
- CAS Number: 541-95-7
- PubChem CID: 10948
- ChemSpider: 10484
- UNII: 1T1KN15LF8

Chemical and physical data
- Formula: C_{6}H_{13}NO_{2}
- Molar mass: 131.175 g·mol^{−1}
- 3D model (JSmol): Interactive image
- SMILES: CCCC(C)OC(=O)N
- InChI: InChI=1S/C6H13NO2/c1-3-4-5(2)9-6(7)8/h5H,3-4H2,1-2H3,(H2,7,8); Key:HZMVPSHLMIQQNX-UHFFFAOYSA-N

Hedonal is an anesthetic agent first synthesised in 1899 and developed as a medicine in Russia in the 1920s. It is the carbamate derivative of 2-pentanol. It was found to be safer and more effective than agents such as chloroform and diethyl ether which were commonly used as anesthetics at the time, but fell into disuse following the introduction of the barbiturates.

== See also ==
- 2-Methyl-2-butanol
- Emylcamate
- Ethchlorvynol
- Meprobamate
