= Konstantin Selyavin =

Russian footballer

Personal information
- Full name: Konstantin Vladimirovich Selyavin
- Date of birth: 8 April 1974 (age 52)
- Place of birth: Ryazan, Russian SFSR
- Height: 1.76 m (5 ft 9 1/2 in)
- Position: Defender

Senior career*
Years	Team	Apps	(Gls)
1991–1999	FC Spartak Ryazan	271	(35)
2000	FC Ryazan-Agrokomplekt Ryazan	16	(0)
2001	FC Spartak Lukhovitsy	33	(4)
2002–2009	FC Ryazan	216	(2)
- * Club domestic league appearances and goals

Konstantin Vladimirovich Selyavin (Russian: Константин Владимирович Селявин; born 8 April 1974) is a former Russian professional football player.

== Club career ==
He played two seasons in the Russian Football National League for FC Torpedo Ryazan.
