= Ryazan Kremlin =

Museum in Ryazan, Russia

Coordinates: 54.6358°N 39.7483°E

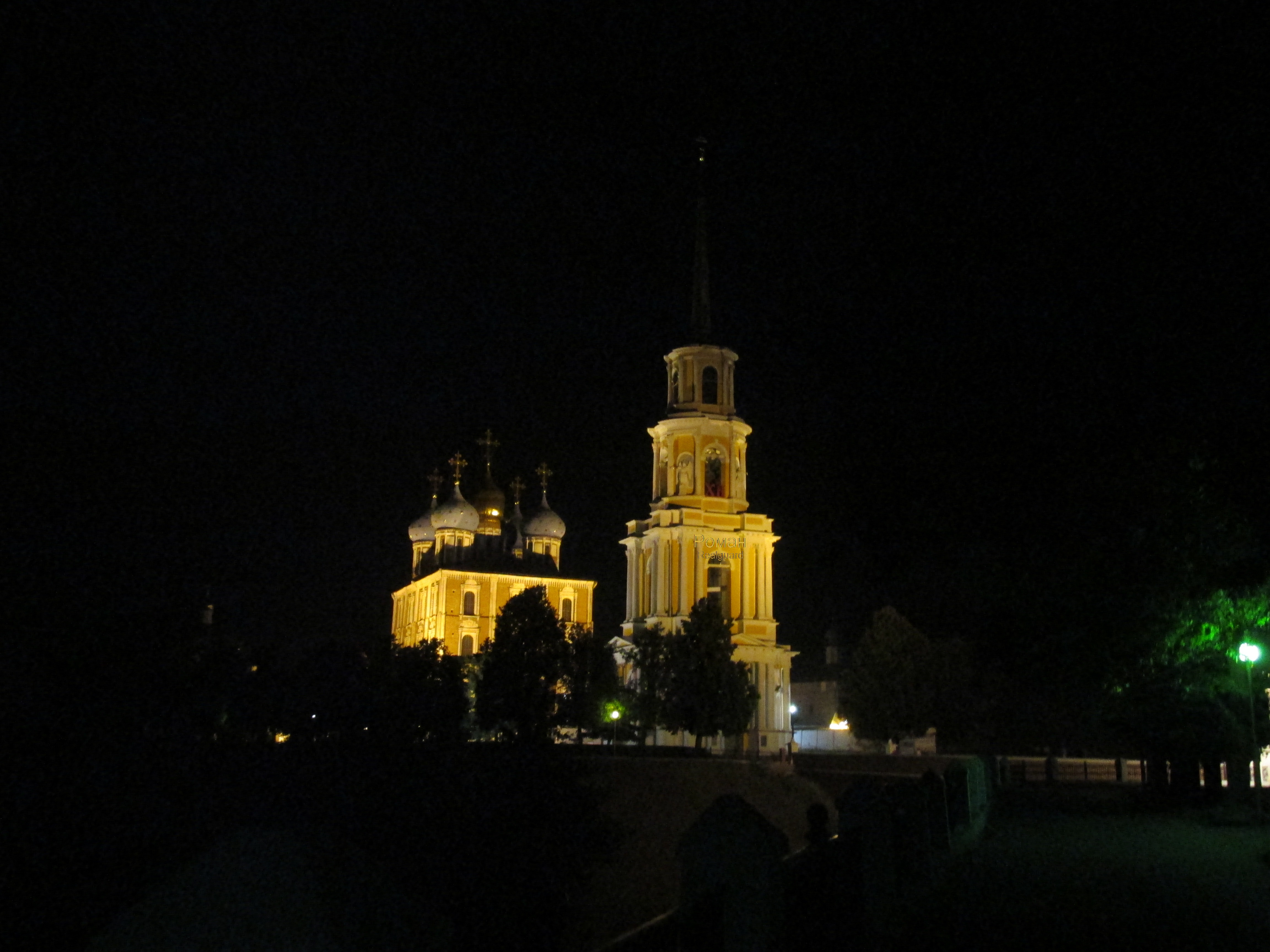
Uspensky Cathedral

The Ryazan Kremlin (Russian: Рязанский кремль), the oldest part of the city of Ryazan, is a historical and architectural museum. It is one of the oldest museums in Russia. Located on the top of a steep hill, it is surrounded by rivers and a dry moat. This monument of architecture and nature reserve of federal importance is included in the State Register of Especially Valuable Objects of the People of the Russian Federation. The management of this museum is the responsibility of the Federal State Institution of Culture "Ryazan Kremlin"

== History ==
=== Ancient period ===
Human settlement on the territory of the Kremlin had occurred during the Mesolithic era. Archaeological excavations indicate large settlements in the territory of modern Fefёlovo Bora Kanishchevo, neighborhoods in Borki and Fisherman's streets.

Slavic tribes had colonized these places already by the 6th-7th centuries. Closest to the fortress of the future settlement of Borkovskoye, people on the island of Oka led an active trade with the Byzantine Empire, East and West. The second major settlement was a fortified fort named Borisov-Glebov. Later, it became Pereyaslavlskoy residence of bishops, and then known as the area of Borisoglebskaya.

Large clusters of settlements in the area, as well as the presence of a large commercial port has necessitated the construction of a fortified city to protect the population and the surrounding area. This city became Pereyaslavl-Ryazan.

=== Foundation of the city ===
The date that Kremlin Pereyaslavl-Ryazan was founded is listed in the Psalter, and today is stored in the Museum-Reserve

In the 11th century Pereyaslavl-Ryazan Kremlin was a fortified castle, located in the highest, north-western part of the modern architectural complex on the site of the present church of the Holy Spirit today, an area of 2 hectares. Around the fortress were various suburbs, and numerous neukreplёnnye settlement in which the peasants, fisherman, and poor artisans lived. Streets were paved with wood, and yards were located close to each other. A princes' tower apparently stood on the site of the modern Dukhovskoy church.

The area around the city was occupied by vast forests, two natural barriers, and Trubezh Lybed to navigate. On the hill there were two lakes, Fast and Karasev, where in the event of a siege people could take drinking water. At one point, the rivers flooded, turning the Kremlin into an island.

== The architectural ensemble ==
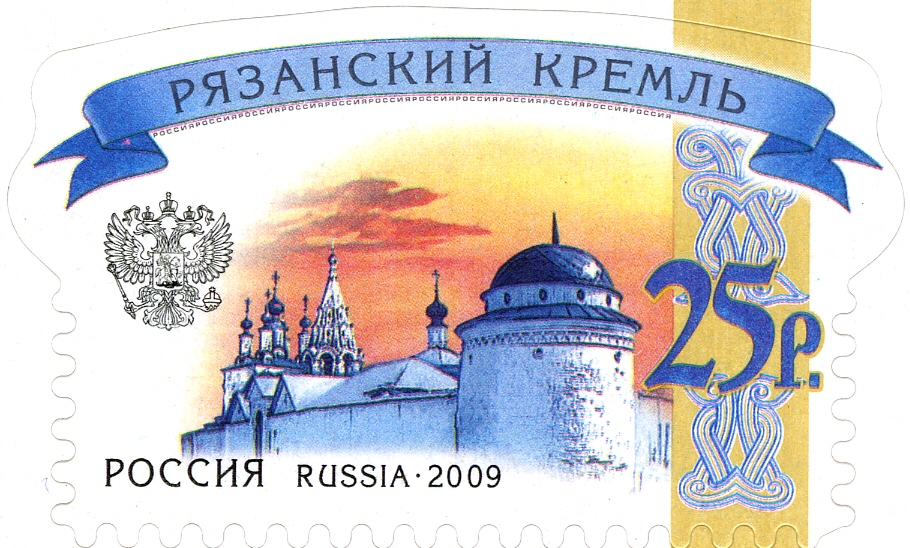
Walls and towers of Spassky Monastery Ryazan Kremlin.

Ryazan Kremlin is an architectural sight of the central historical part of the city. The Cathedral of the Assumption Cathedral and bell tower are designed so that their silhouettes can be seen from some distance in the city, and for him. From the 18th century to the first half of the 20th century, they were natural visual cues when navigating on the Oka River. In good weather, the spires and domes of the Kremlin can be seen far away from the city.

The Cathedral of the Assumption Cathedral and bell tower are also a logical completion of the architectural street Cathedral.

=== Cathedrals and churches ===
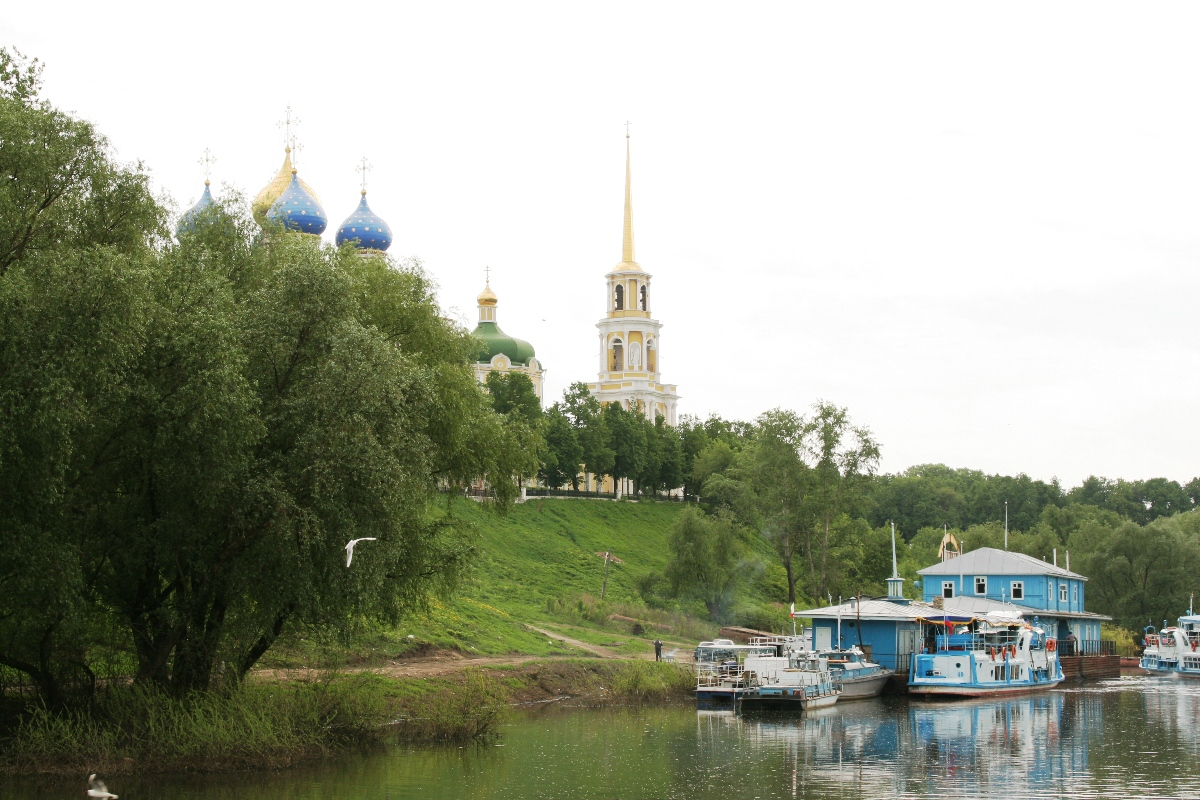
View of the Cathedral from the river Trubezh

There are 8 churches in the ensemble, 6 in separate buildings, and 2 in public buildings.
