= Ryazan =

City in Ryazan Oblast, Russia

Ryazan Рязань
- City
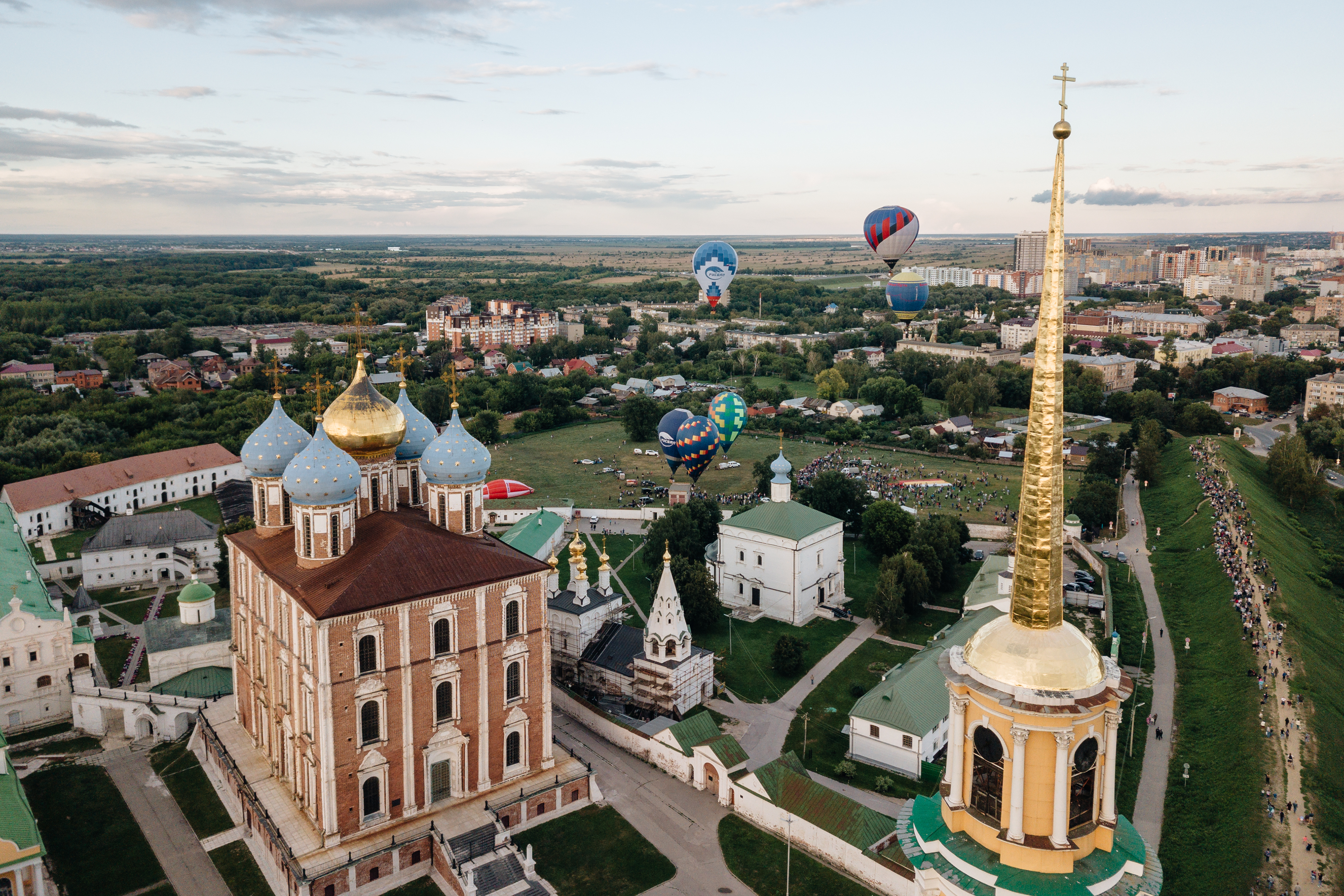
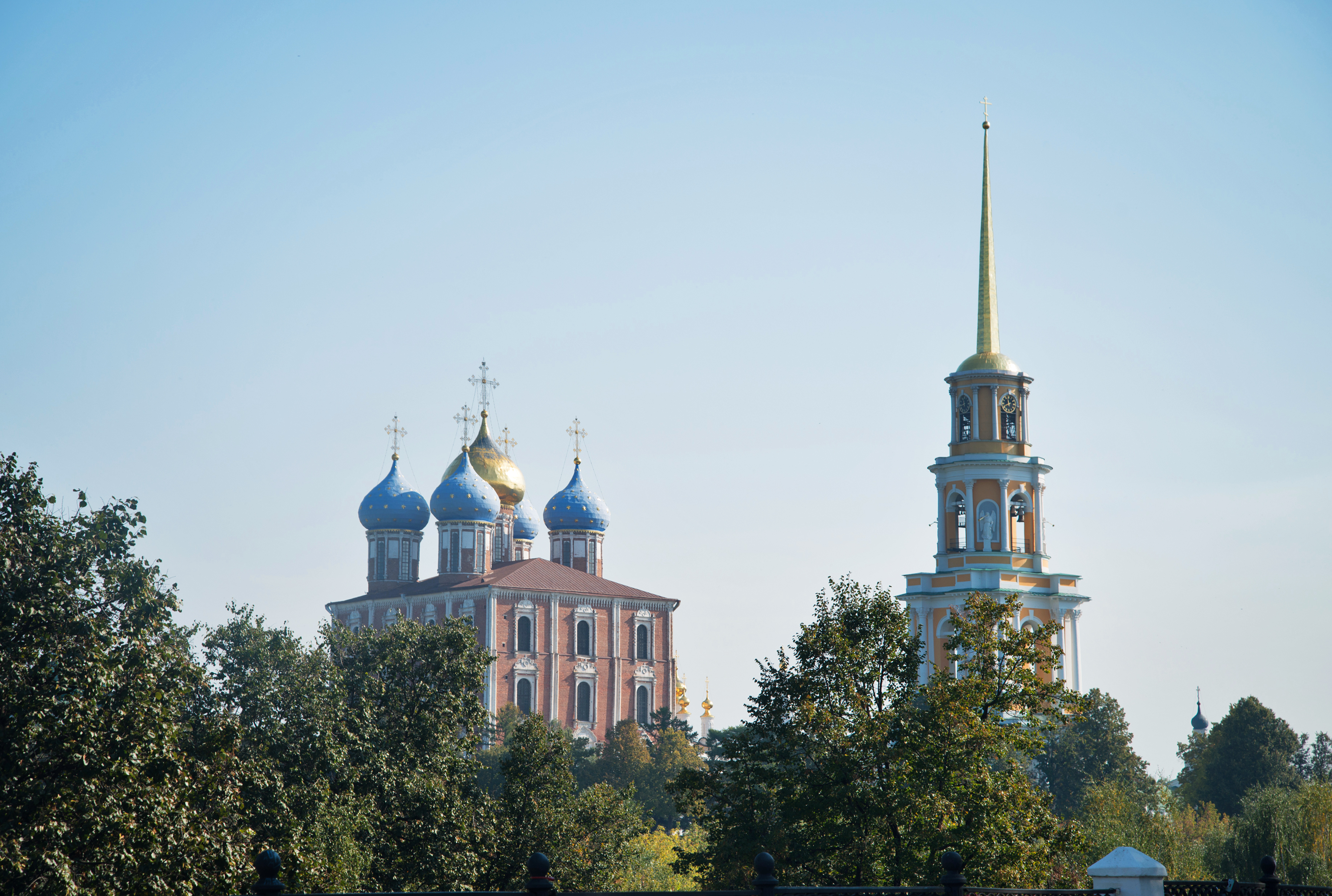
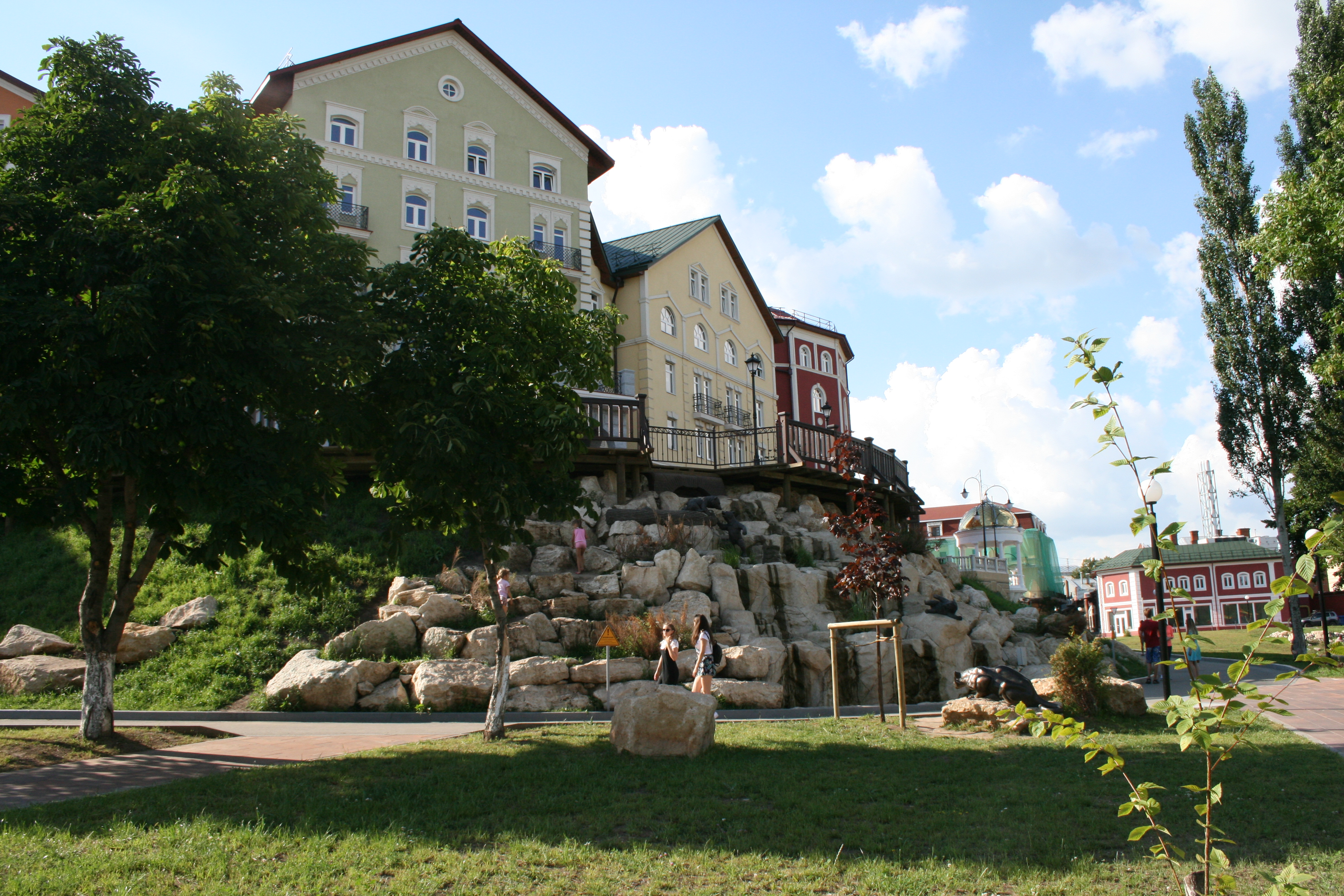
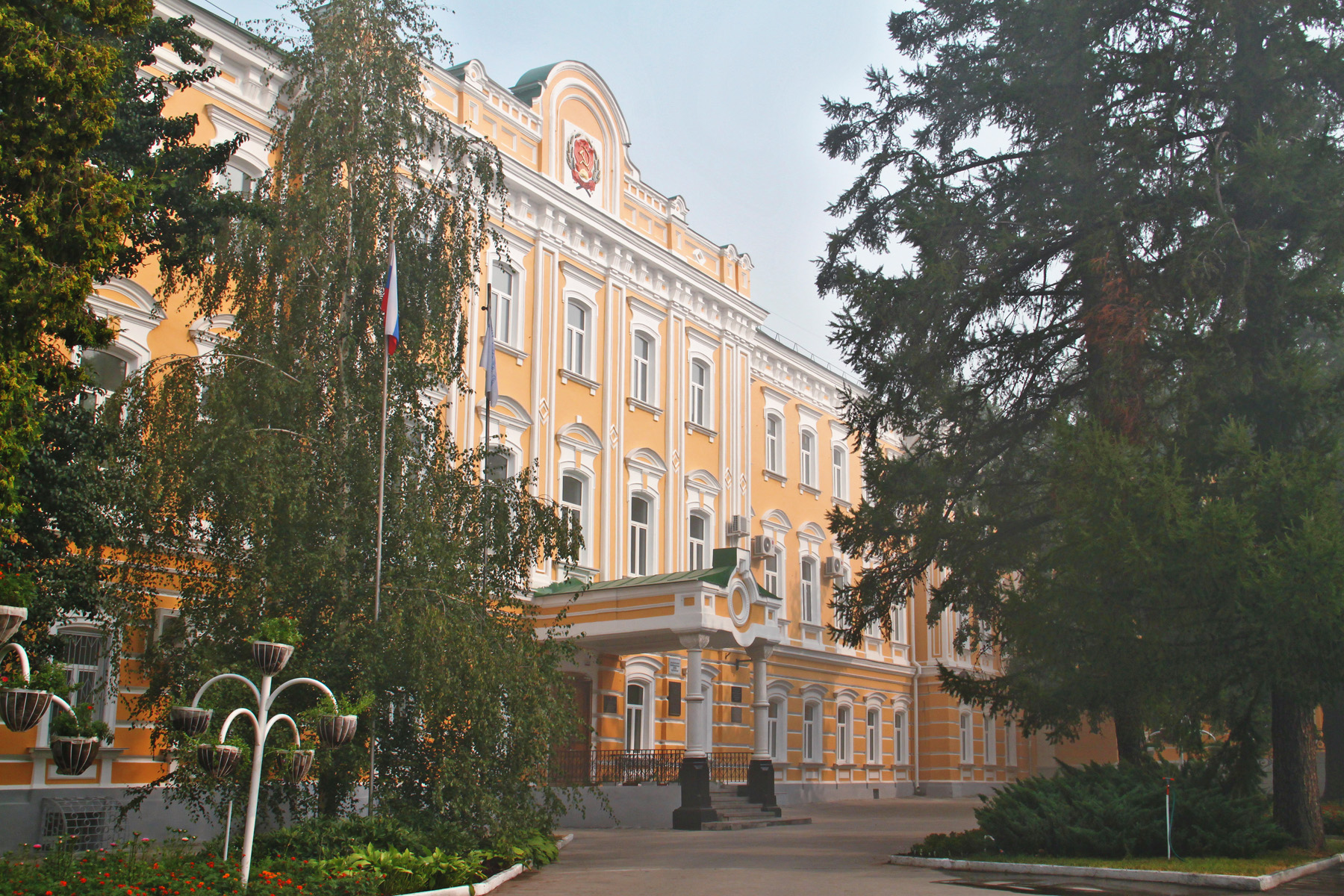
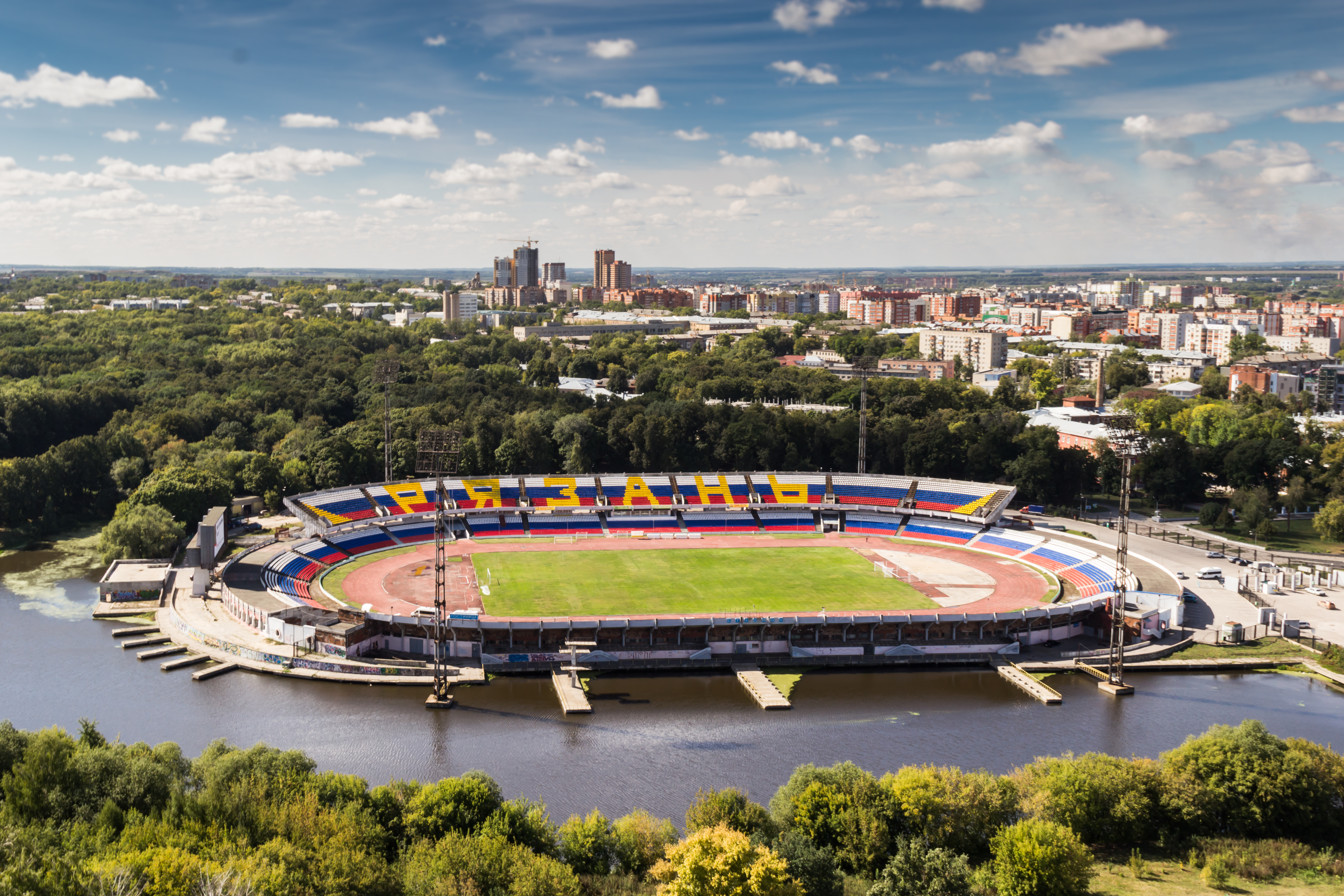
- Hot air balloon festival in Ryazan Ryazan Kremlin Lybedsky Boulevard Ryazan State University Ryazan Regional Drama Theatre Central Sports Complex

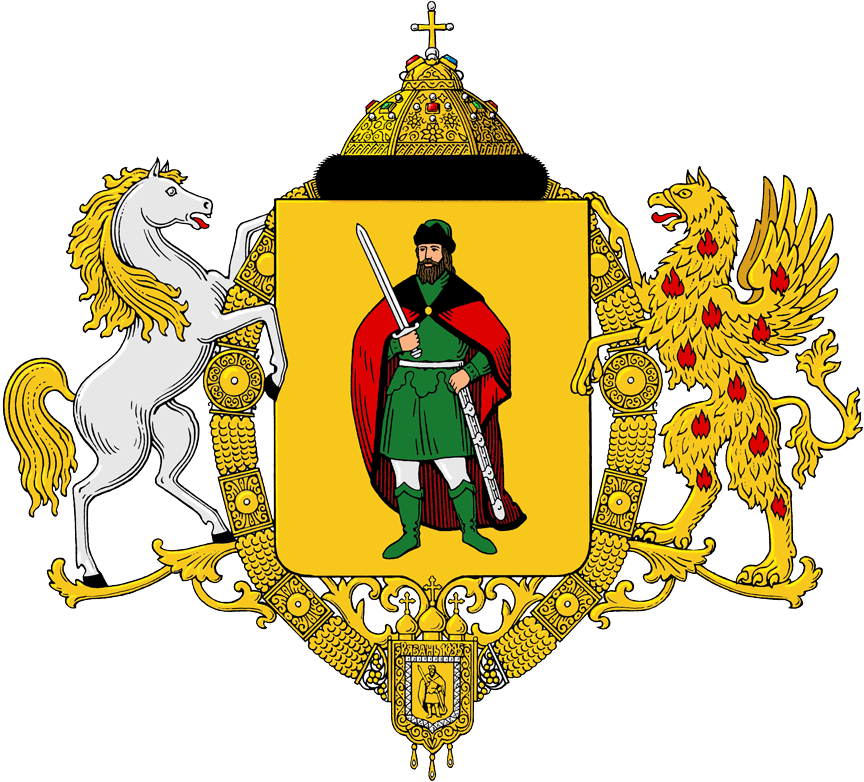
- Flag Coat of arms
- Interactive map of Ryazan
- Location of Ryazan Ryazan (European Russia) Ryazan (Russia) Ryazan (Europe) Ryazan (Earth)
- Coordinates: 54°37′48″N 39°44′33″E
- Country: Russia
- Federal subject: Ryazan Oblast
- First mentioned: 1095

Government
  - Body: City Duma
  - Mayor: Vitalii Artemov

Area
  - Total: 224.163 km^{2} (86.550 sq mi)
- Elevation: 130 m (430 ft)

Population (2010 Census)
  - Total: 524,927
  - Estimate (2025): 532,772 (+1.5%)
  - Rank: 31st in 2010
  - Density: 2,341.72/km^{2} (6,065.03/sq mi)

Administrative status
  - Subordinated to: city of oblast significance of Ryazan
  - Capital of: Ryazan Oblast, Ryazansky District

Municipal status
  - Urban okrug: Ryazan Urban Okrug
  - Capital of: Ryazan Urban Okrug, Ryazansky Municipal District
- Time zone: UTC+3 (MSK)
- Postal code: 390000-390048
- Dialing code: +7 4912
- OKTMO ID: 61701000001
- Website: www.admrzn.ru

Ryazan (Russian: Рязань, IPA: [rʲɪˈzanʲ]; also Riazan) is the largest city and the administrative center of Ryazan Oblast, Russia. The city is located on the banks of the Oka River in Central Russia, 196 km (122 mi) southeast of Moscow. As of the 2010 Census, Ryazan had a population of 524,927, making it the 33rd most populated city in Russia, and the fourth most populated in Central Russia after Moscow, Voronezh, and Yaroslavl.

Historical population
Year	Pop.	±%
1897	46,122	—
1926	48,989	+6.2%
1939	95,357	+94.6%
1959	214,130	+124.6%
1970	350,151	+63.5%
1979	453,267	+29.4%
1989	514,638	+13.5%
2002	521,560	+1.3%
2010	524,927	+0.6%
2021	528,599	+0.7%
Source: Census data

An older city, now known as Old Ryazan (Russian: Старая Рязань, romanized: Staraya Ryazan), was located 50 km (31 mi) east of modern-day Ryazan during the late Middle Ages, and served as capital of the Principality of Ryazan up until the Mongol invasion in 1237. During the Siege of Ryazan, it became one of the first cities in Russia to be besieged and completely razed to the ground. The capital was subsequently moved to Pereyaslavl-Ryazansky (Russian: Переяславль-Рязанский), and later renamed to Ryazan by order of Catherine the Great in 1778.

The city is known for the Ryazan Kremlin, a historic museum; the Pozhalostin Museum, one of the oldest art museums in Russia; the Memorial Museum-Estate of Academician I.P. Pavlov; and the Ryazan Museum of Long-Range Aviation.

In 2022, the Ministry of Construction published an updated rating of the new urban digitalization index. Ryazan entered the top three cities with a population of 250 thousand to a million people.

== History ==
=== Principality of Ryazan ===
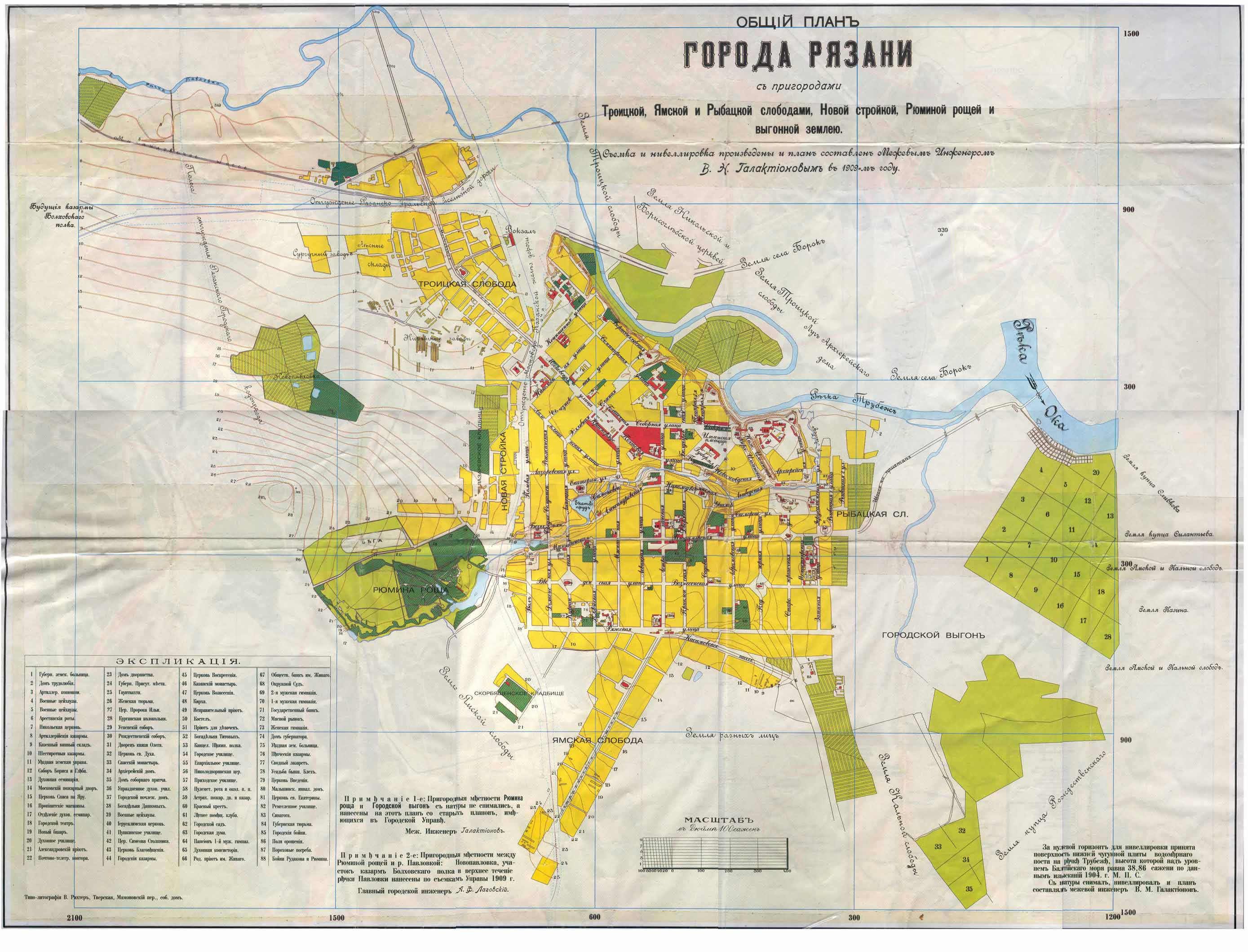
Old map of Ryazan (1909)

The first written mention of the city, under the name of Pereslavl, dates to 1095. The city became part of the independent Principality of Ryazan, which had existed since 1129, centered on the old city of Ryazan. The first ruler of Ryazan was supposedly Yaroslav Sviatoslavich, Prince of Ryazan and Murom (cities of Kievan Rus').

==== Invasion by Mongols ====
In the 12th century, the lands of Ryazan – being located on the border between woodlands and the steppe – suffered numerous invasions from the southern and northern parts of European Russia. Southern invasions were usually carried out by the Cumans; on the northern side Ryazan was in conflict with Vladimir-Suzdal, who by the end of the 12th century had burnt the capital of Ryazan several times.

In the 13th century, Ryazan was the first Russian city to face Mongolian invasion by the hordes of Batu Khan. On 21 December 1237, after a short siege, it was completely destroyed and never recovered. As a result of the takeover, the seat of the principality was moved about 55 km (34 mi) to the town of Pereslavl-Ryazansky, which subsequently took the name of the destroyed capital. The site of the old capital now carries the name of Staraya Ryazan (Old Ryazan), close to Spassk-Ryazansky. Maps of the 16th-18th centuries show Ryazan (Old Ryazan) and Pereslavl-Ryazan together.

==== Golden Horde ====
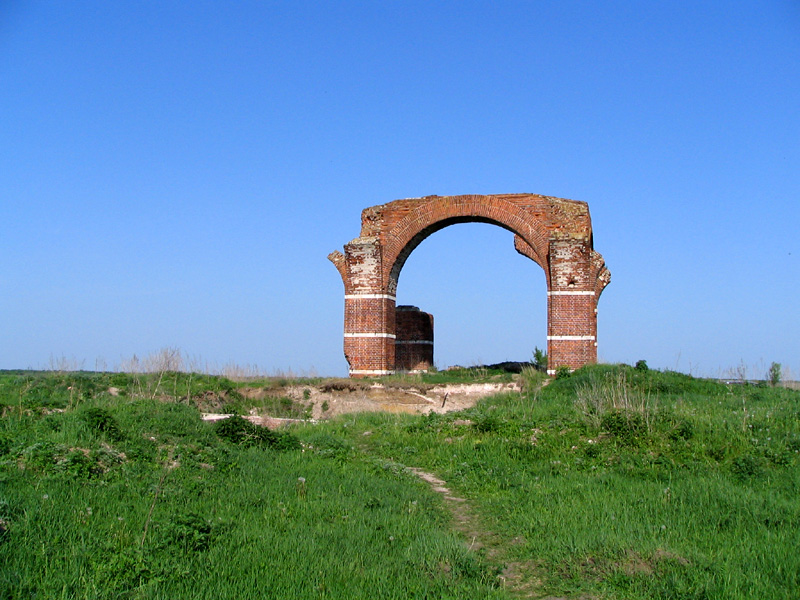
Old Ryazan remnants: Cathedral of St. Boris and Gleb

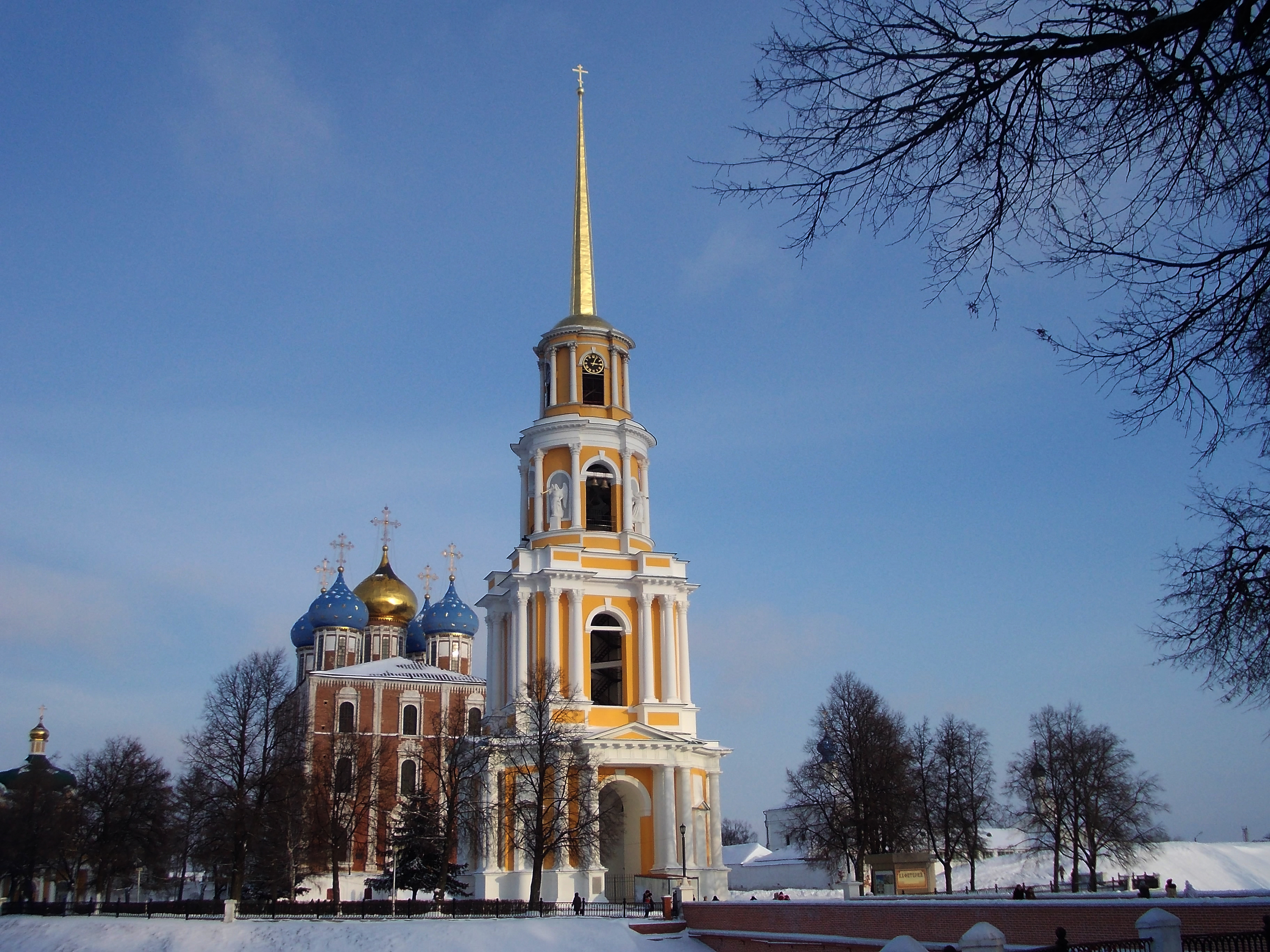
Ryazan Kremlin

In 1380, during the Battle of Kulikovo, the Grand Prince of Ryazan Oleg and his men came under a coalition of Mamai, a strongman of the Tatar Golden Horde, and the Grand Duke of Lithuania, against the armies under the command of the Grand Prince of Vladimir, Dmitry Donskoy.

Late in the 13th century, the Princes of Ryazan moved their capital to Pereyaslavl' (Russian: Переяславль), which is known as Ryazan from the 16th century (officially renamed in 1778).

The principality was finally dissolved and incorporated into the Grand Duchy of Moscow in 1521. The principality's last duke, Ivan V of Ryazan, was imprisoned for a short time for being suspected of a treasonous attempt to seal a treaty with Crimean Khanate in order to outweigh Moscow's influence. The duke fled to the Grand Duchy of Lithuania where he died no later than 1534.

Being the southernmost border of Rus' lands at the time, Ryazan continued to suffer from invasions of Crimean Tatars and their allies.

=== Grand Duchy of Moscow ===
==== Tsardom of Russia ====
===== Time of Troubles =====
In June of 1605 Ryazan became a seat for Greek Cypriot-born Patriarch Ignatius, a clergyman who was sent by Russian Orthodox Church to serve as an archbishop of Ryazan. He was notorious for becoming the first church official to recognize a Poland-backed impostor False-Dmitry as a legitimate monarch, alleged Czar of Tsardom of Russia, after meeting with his forces in Tula.

Around that time Ryazan ex-duchy became a home for various noble families, most notable of which are Lyapunovs, whose brothers Prokopy and Zakhary Lyapunov played a significant roles in shaping Russian history during the Time of Troubles.

=== Soviet Union ===
During World War II, Ryazan was repeatedly bombed by German Luftwaffe. Immediately after the war, rapid development of the city began, and it became a major industrial, scientific, and military center of the European part of Russia. On 19 October 1960 a petroleum refinery produced its first gasoline.

Ryazan housed the USSR's only producer of potato-harvesting equipment at the time. Ryazselmash factory (Russian: Рязсельмаш, lit. 'Ryazan Countryside Machines'), an accounting machines plant, and a heavy forging equipment plant, among others, were also built.

Because of the city's industrialization, Ryazan Oblast's share of workers employed in the agrarian sector shifted into the industrial sector.

Ryazan was developed as a military center and became the main training center of the Soviet Airborne Forces. Besides the Airborne School (at the time named after Kliment Voroshilov), Ryazan has the Automobile School and Institute of Communications, a regiment of railway troops, an airbase for strategic bombers, and a training center in Diaghilev.

Ryazan developed particularly rapidly while Nadezhda Nikolaevna Chumakova served as Chair of the Council of People's Deputies of Ryazan and Ryazan mayor. Under Chumakova, the city's population increased from 72,000 to 520,000. Chumakova oversaw the construction of social and cultural amenities, more than 20 urban areas, and hundreds of kilometers of trolleybus, tram and bus routes. Landscaping became a fundamental strategy for the development of the city at that time. A "green" ring of forests, parks, and garden associations surrounded Ryazan, with large parks located in each area of the city, and compositions of flowers and vertical gardening became customary, not only for the main streets, but also for industrial zones and factory buildings. Ryazan repeatedly won recognition among the cities of the Soviet Union for its landscaping. During her 26 years in office, Chumakova often accepted awards of the Red Banner of the USSR on behalf of Ryazan.

=== Post-Soviet period ===
By the time of the collapse of the Soviet Union, more than half of the city's GDP was being exported into its satellite states. In the 1990s, Ryazan experienced significant economic troubles as part of the 1998 Russian financial crisis, with many ex-Soviet and newly established companies going bankrupt by the end of the decade. In September 1999, Ryazan suffered a series of attempted apartment bombings (see Ryazan Incident below).

As of 2001, Ryazan remained significantly politically and economically influenced by the neighboring Moscow Oblast.

== Culture ==
=== Architecture ===
Ryazan's churches were built between the 15th and 19th centuries.

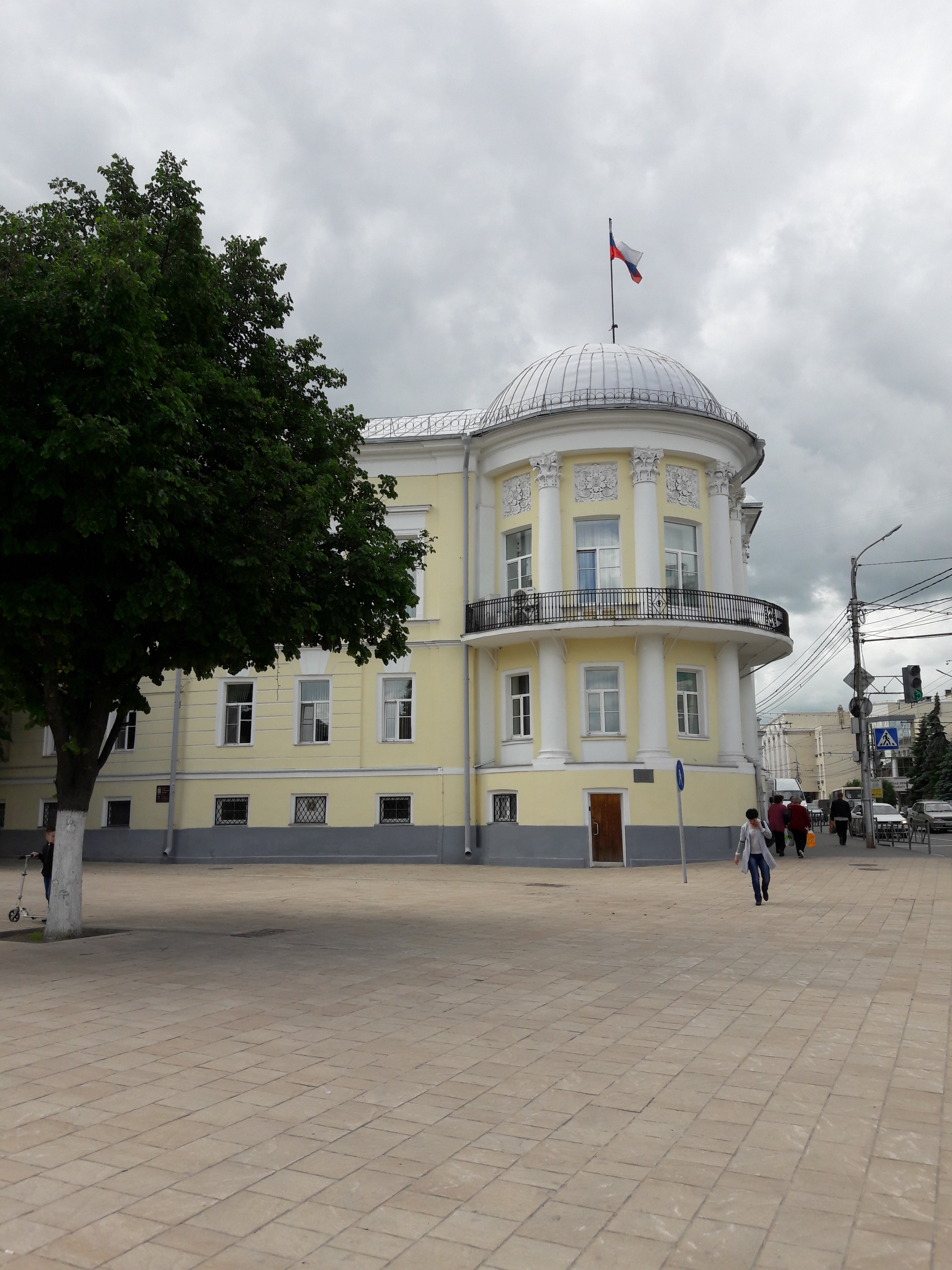
Pochtovaya street

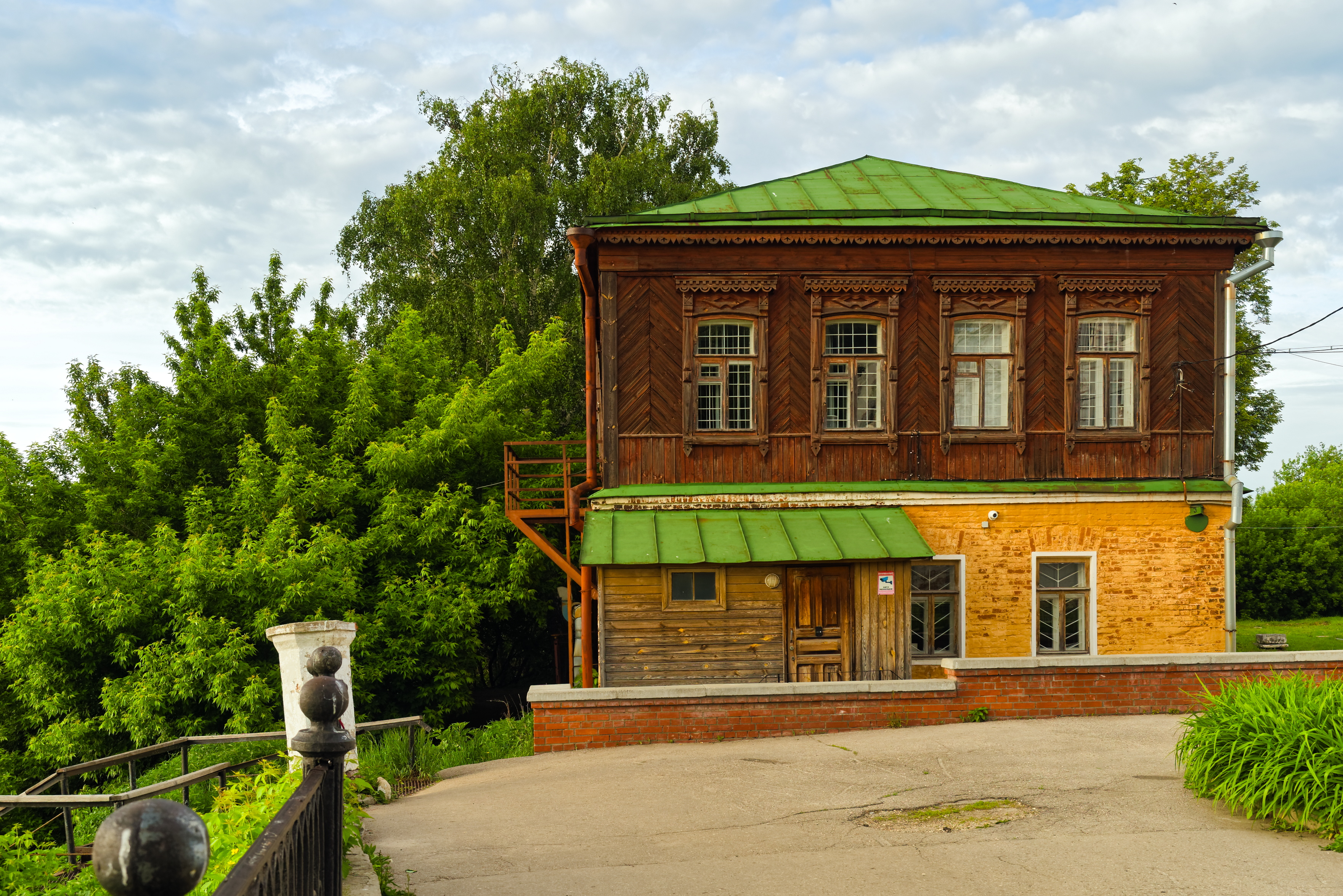
Old buildings in the city

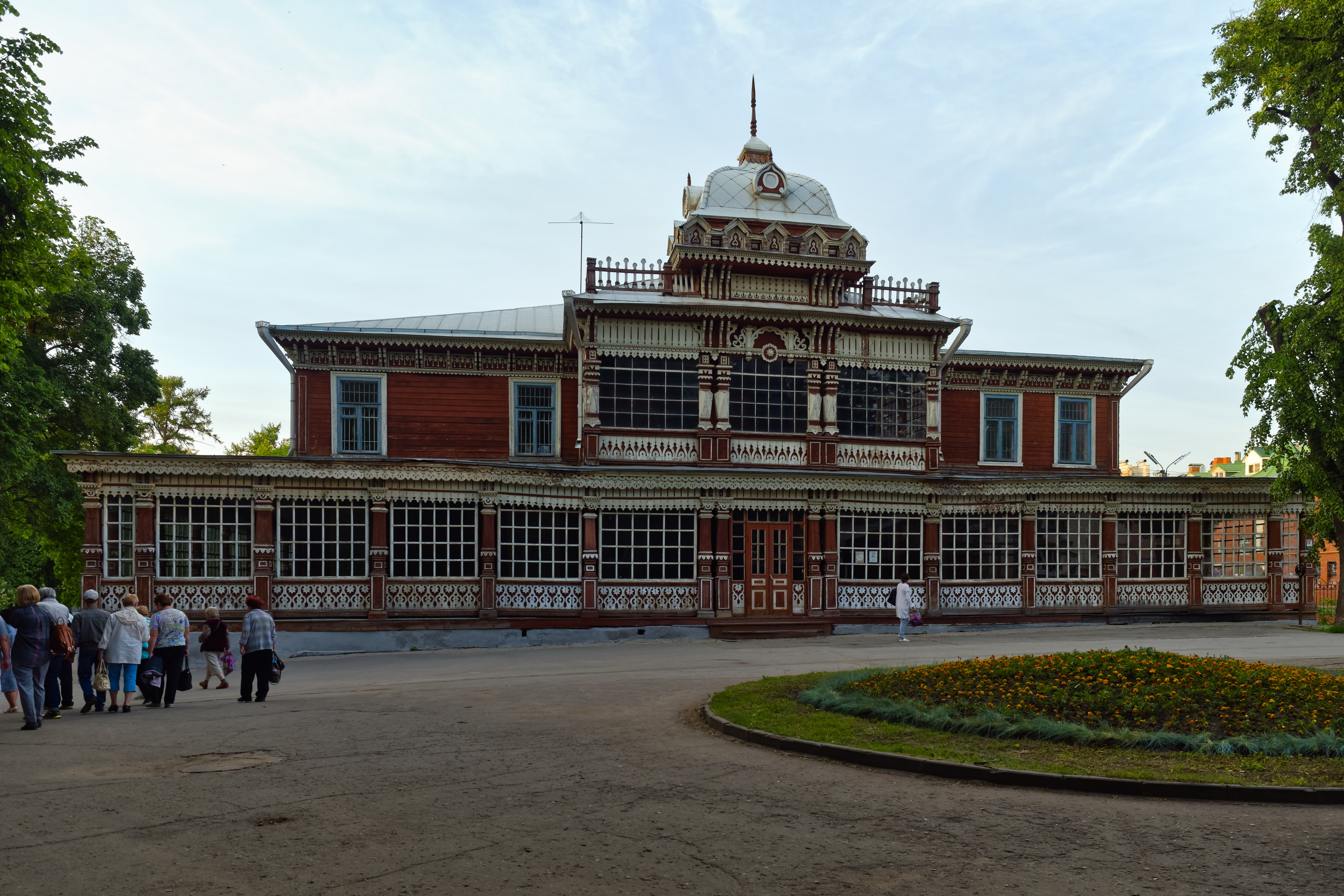
Noble Assembly Summer Club. After the Russian Revolution of 1917 it was renamed the Palace of People's Arts.

=== Community ===
In 2006 and 2007, the Public Committee in Defense of the Historical and Architectural Museum "Ryazan Kremlin" campaigned against attempts by the Diocese of Voronezh to establish ownership over the Ryazan Kremlin.

A number of environmental groups are active in the city, campaigning for the removal of illegal landfills and volunteering for water area clean up. In 2019 and 2020, these groups organized and staged ecological pickets and protests.

=== Religion ===
Ryazan is the seat of Diocese of Ryazan and Kasimov, an eparchy of the Russian Orthodox Church. Assumption Cathedral is in the city's Ryazan Kremlin section.

== Geography ==
=== Environment ===
As of 2021 an environmental pollution of air in the city remain relatively high. Excessive emissions of toxic fumes and gaseous substances such as sulfur dioxide (SO_{2}) from neighbouring industries (i.e. oil refinery) located next to the city are often reported by local media. In December 2020 local government was trying to address the problem by fining local commercial organizations.

=== Climate ===
Ryazan has a humid continental climate (Köppen climate classification Dfb). The highest temperature recorded is 39.5 °C (103.1 °F) in August 2010 while the lowest temperature recorded is −40.9 °C (−41.6 °F) in January 1940.

Climate data for Ryazan (1991–2020, extremes 1871–present)
Month	Jan	Feb	Mar	Apr	May	Jun	Jul	Aug	Sep	Oct	Nov	Dec	Year
Record high °C (°F)	6.3 (43.3)	7.5 (45.5)	17.8 (64.0)	29.0 (84.2)	33.5 (92.3)	36.7 (98.1)	38.9 (102.0)	39.5 (103.1)	33.0 (91.4)	24.2 (75.6)	17.6 (63.7)	8.9 (48.0)	39.5 (103.1)
Mean daily maximum °C (°F)	−4.5 (23.9)	−3.7 (25.3)	2.0 (35.6)	12.1 (53.8)	20.4 (68.7)	23.4 (74.1)	25.6 (78.1)	24.0 (75.2)	17.6 (63.7)	9.5 (49.1)	1.4 (34.5)	−3.0 (26.6)	10.4 (50.7)
Daily mean °C (°F)	−7.4 (18.7)	−7.1 (19.2)	−1.8 (28.8)	6.8 (44.2)	14.0 (57.2)	17.4 (63.3)	19.6 (67.3)	17.7 (63.9)	12.2 (54.0)	5.8 (42.4)	−1.1 (30.0)	−5.4 (22.3)	5.9 (42.6)
Mean daily minimum °C (°F)	−10.1 (13.8)	−10.2 (13.6)	−5.2 (22.6)	2.4 (36.3)	8.4 (47.1)	11.9 (53.4)	14.2 (57.6)	12.5 (54.5)	8.0 (46.4)	2.8 (37.0)	−3.2 (26.2)	−8.0 (17.6)	2.0 (35.6)
Record low °C (°F)	−40.9 (−41.6)	−34.8 (−30.6)	−28.6 (−19.5)	−18.6 (−1.5)	−5.0 (23.0)	−1.8 (28.8)	3.5 (38.3)	0.4 (32.7)	−7.3 (18.9)	−14.6 (5.7)	−24.5 (−12.1)	−39.7 (−39.5)	−40.9 (−41.6)
Average precipitation mm (inches)	40 (1.6)	37 (1.5)	32 (1.3)	41 (1.6)	40 (1.6)	64 (2.5)	78 (3.1)	55 (2.2)	51 (2.0)	61 (2.4)	46 (1.8)	48 (1.9)	593 (23.3)
Average rainy days	4	4	5	11	13	15	14	13	14	15	11	5	124
Average snowy days	23	20	13	4	1	0	0	0	0.4	4	14	22	101
Average relative humidity (%)	85	82	76	67	61	70	72	74	77	82	86	85	76
Source: Pogoda.ru.net

== Government ==
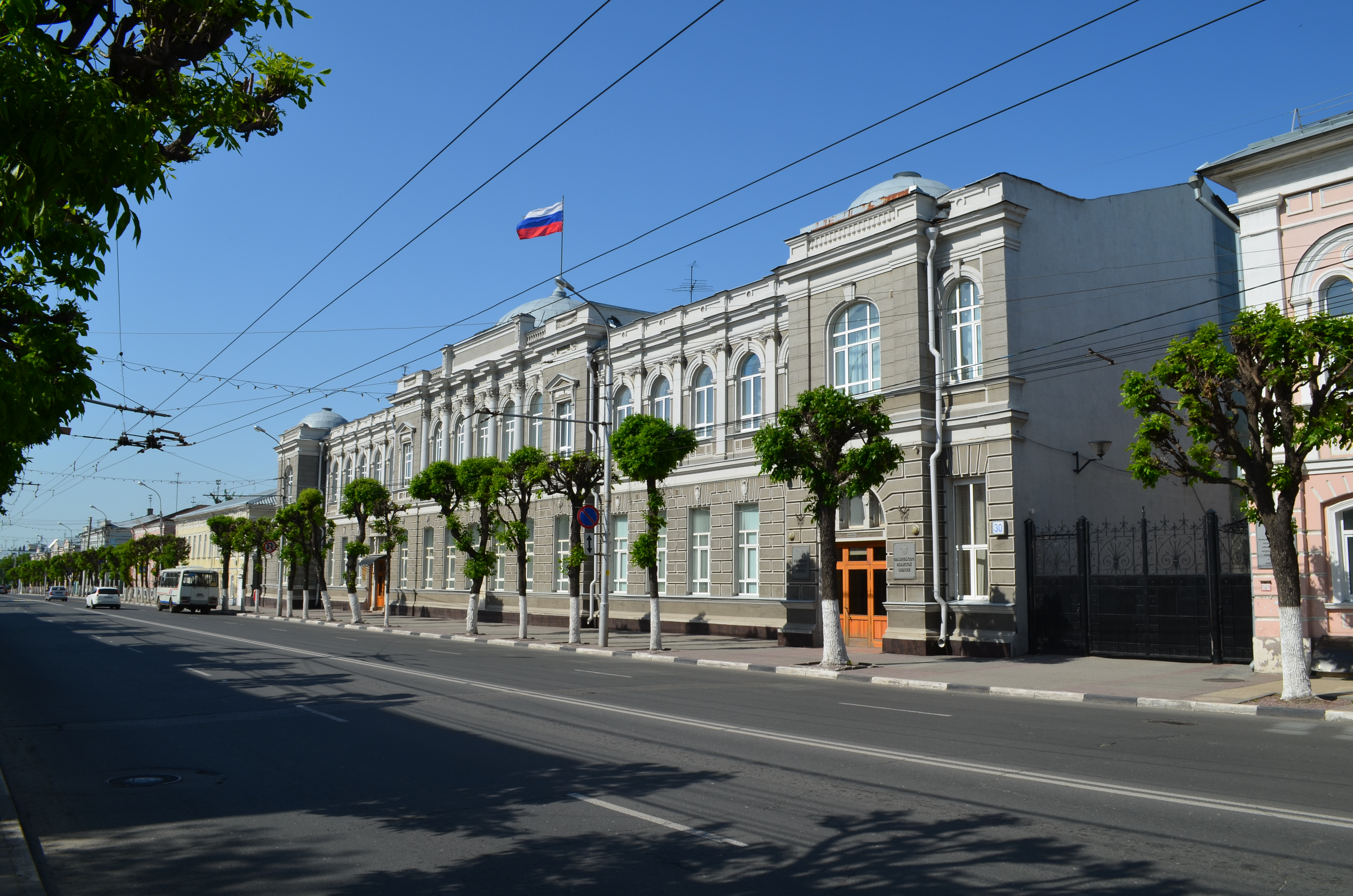
Ryazan Government building

The Ryazan city governing body is divided among the City's legislature (Ryazan City Duma), City administration and the district's courts.

Executive powers of the city are administered by the city governor, his advisers and deputies. Formal control over activities of authorities is exercised by the Public Chamber of the city of Ryazan, who work with youth involved in the headquarters of youth activists.

The City Duma is a local parliament authorized to make city-wide laws. It's divided into sub-committees.

Ryazan is also a system of community councils areas which are deliberative bodies coordinating the work of services housing and communal services and the Department of Public Works in urban areas.

=== Regional authorities ===
The city also hosts different regional governing bodies: Ryazan Oblast Duma (regional parliament), the Government and the Governor of the Ryazan Oblast. In two urban and one suburban residence being received at the highest level.

=== Administrative and municipal status ===

Ryazan is the administrative center of the oblast and, within the framework of administrative divisions, it also serves as the administrative center of Ryazansky District, even though it is not a part of it. As an administrative division, it is incorporated separately as the city of regional significance of Ryazan — an administrative unit with the status equal to that of the districts. As a municipal division, the city is incorporated as Ryazan Urban Circuit.

=== City districts ===
The city of Ryazan is divided into four administrative districts:

- Moskovsky district (North-Western)
- Oktyabrsky district (Eastern)
- Sovetsky district, including a separate Solotcha district (North Eastern)
- Zheleznodorozhny district (Southern)

=== Protests ===
In January 2021 the city saw a spike in protest activity. As many as 2000 people have participated in rallies in Ryazan alone as part of the 2021 Russian protests.

== Education ==
Important educational institutions in the city include:

- Ryazan State Radio Engineering University (RSREU):
  - The university studies mechanical and electrical engineering, software development and others fields ;
  - As of 2016 RSREU in a joint mission with EPAM offered free courses in software testing automation, front-end web software development (C# and .NET), and programming in JAVA.
- Higher Paratrooper Command Academy (HPCA), Russia state-run military school training officers for the airborne forces. Because of HPCA the city is often referred as the "paratrooper capital" (Russian: Столица ВДВ). In 2010, the institution discontinued enrollment to its paratrooping program, and now focuses on training professional sergeants for the armed forces ;
- Gorky Library serves Ryazan as well as Ryazan Oblast. It is the largest library in the region ;
- Ryazan State Medical University (RSMU) ;
- Ryazan State University ;
- Various technological colleges.

== Crime ==
=== 1990s gangs ===
External images
- Vyacheslav Ermolov, unknown date
- Vyacheslav Ermolov (left) with members of his gang, 1990s

Ryazan, like many cities in Russia after the collapse of the Soviet Union, saw a rise in crime during the 1990s. Slonovskaya organized criminal group (Russian: Слоновская ОПГ) (Slony for short), one of the largest gangs in Russia, managed to monopolize the downtown area and the criminal underworld of Ryazan. The name is literally translated as "Elephants", after one of its leaders' height and power: Vyacheslav Ermolov Evgenievich (born 1962), nicknamed "Elephant". Before his criminal career started, he was a taxi driver. The other leader was a personal driver of the vice prosecutor of the city.

In 1991, the gang became heavily involved in the racketeering of newly privatized industries, motor vehicle sales, real estate, contract killings in other regions, participated in gang violence, kidnappings, and committed at least one armed attack on rivals which left eight or ten dead in November of 1993.

According to Russian TV channel NTV, the gang was linked to local authorities. By 1995, Slony managed to briefly seize control over almost the entire business community of Ryazan. This situation continued up until 1996 when local law enforcement managed to apprehend some suspects linked to the gang. By 2000 the gang was almost eliminated. Some members were either sentenced to jail or were on the run. One member of the group allegedly committed suicide in a detention center of Tolyatti in 2016 and another in Ryazan according to Russian sources. Slony's chief leader, Ermolov, was still wanted as of August 2021.

In the same period, evidence was gathered against the former (4th) mayor and chairman of city duma, Fyodor Provotorov. Provotorova held powerful positions in the city for eight years, and, according to local authorities, was associated with the activities of the Slony gang.

Besides Slony, there were two other powerful criminal groups which rivaled Slony and were active in 1996-2001: Osokyn's gang and Airapetov's gang. By the 2018 many of Elephants had served their prison terms and were freed. Some of members of the Osokyn's gang were sentenced up to 20 years in 2011. Its leader, who is currently a fugitive, was allegedly apprehended in 2016 by Ukrainian authorities in Ukraine.

=== Ryazan Incident ===
In 1999 a group of allegedly plain-clothes FSB officers attempted to blow up a building on the East side of the city. The event is known as the Ryazan Incident.

=== 2000s ===
Today, the crime rate in Ryazan is one of the lowest among the cities of the Central Federal District according to the Russian Interior Ministry. In the first six-months of 2012, 579,6 crimes were reported per 100 000 people, almost half the Central Federal District average of 839 reported crimes per 100 000 people. The low crime rate in Ryazan is often attributed to an increased number of police patrols, a high number of military schools, and voluntary militias headquarters distributed throughout the city's districts.

== Economy ==
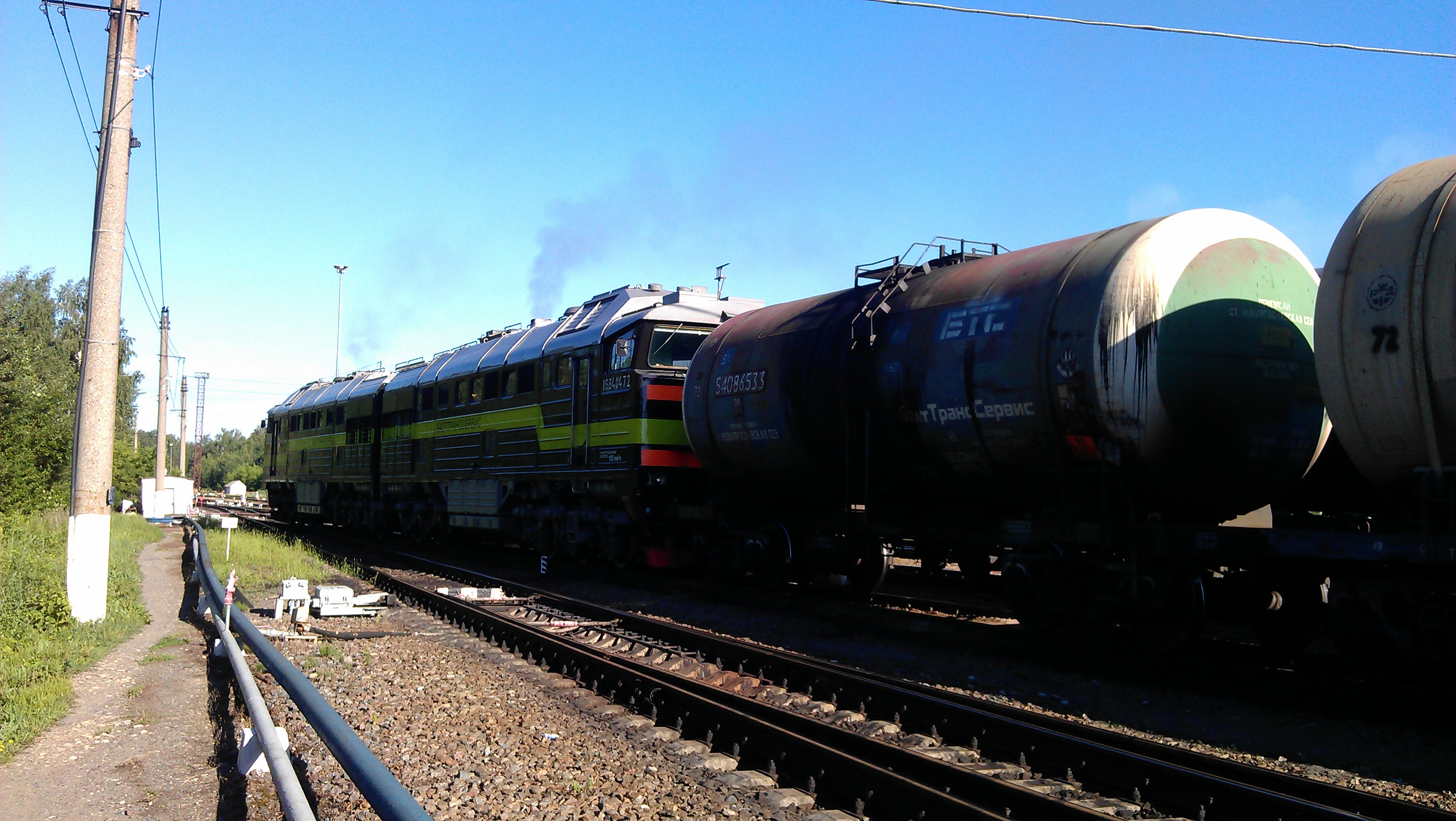
Railroads supply local refining industry with petroleum

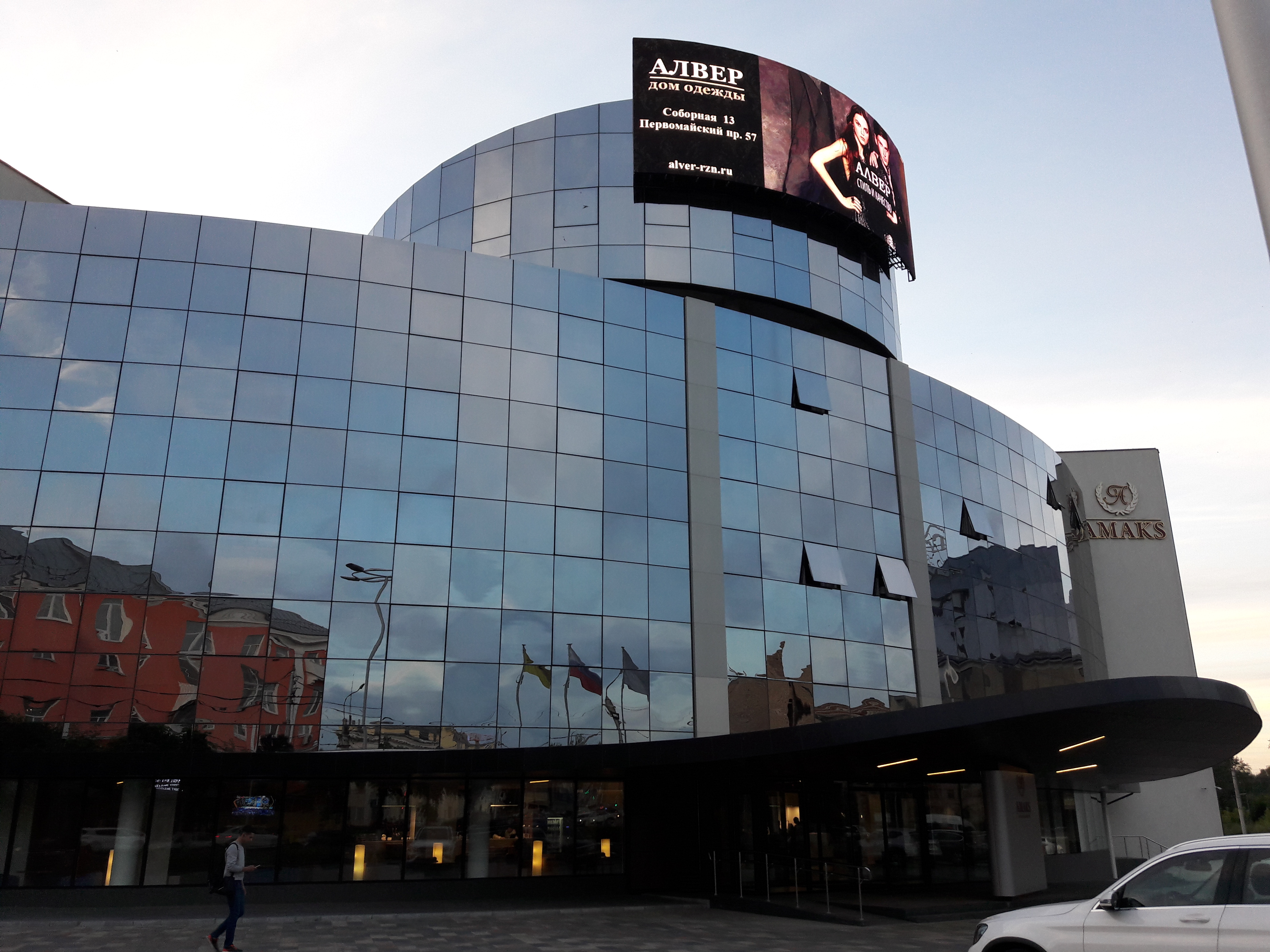
City hotel AMAKS

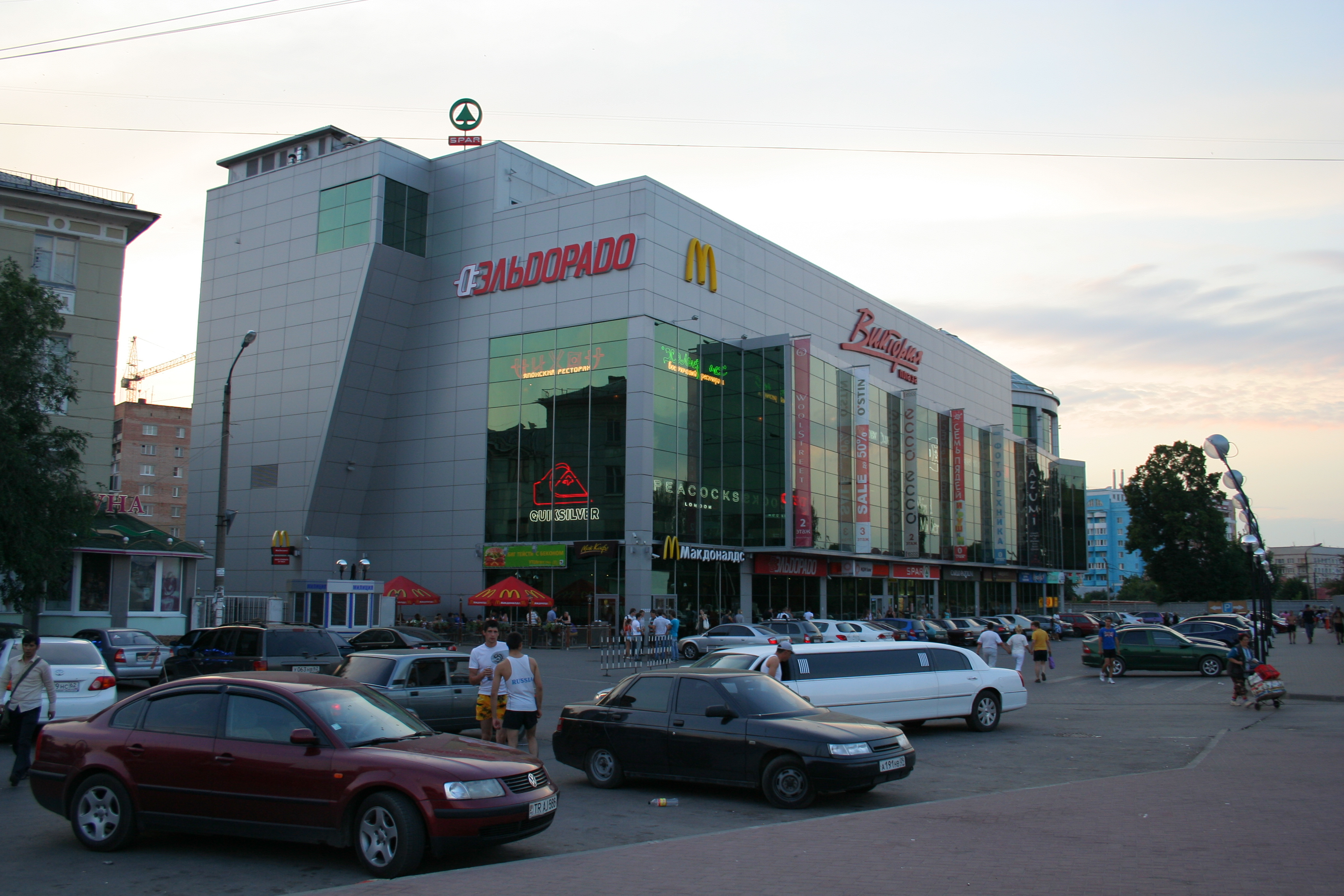
Central Mall

Major industry enterprises in the city include a military radio electronics production plant and an oil refinery (subsidiary) of Rosneft, JSC Ryazan Oil Refining Company). The plant can refine 17 million metric tons of oil per year and is the city's largest employer.

Around a quarter of the city's population works in the electronics industry. The most notable company in this sector is Plazma, which produces plasma screens for products including tanks and locomotives. In 1994, the company created a 50-50 research and development joint-venture with the South Korean company Orion PDP. In addition to plasma technology, Plazma produces LCD screens, industrial gas lasers and medical lasers. The company exports its products to the United States, China, and Israel, among others.

In 1993 software development company EPAM Systems entered the Ryazan market. As of 2016 it worked in joint venture with RSREU helping to teach students for free.

In 2012 Russian search giant Yandex launched the 40MW data center in Sasovo; it is expected to accommodate 100,000 servers by 2019.

A steel casting company in the northwestern section of the city produces heavy steelworks and product, including industrial steel pipes for use in nuclear power plants. The plant employs a centrifugal casting method.

=== Public transportation ===
A railway connects city to the Moscow (since 1864) via two train stations: Ryazan I and Ryazan II; both of which are part of the Ryazan railroad transit system within the city's borders.

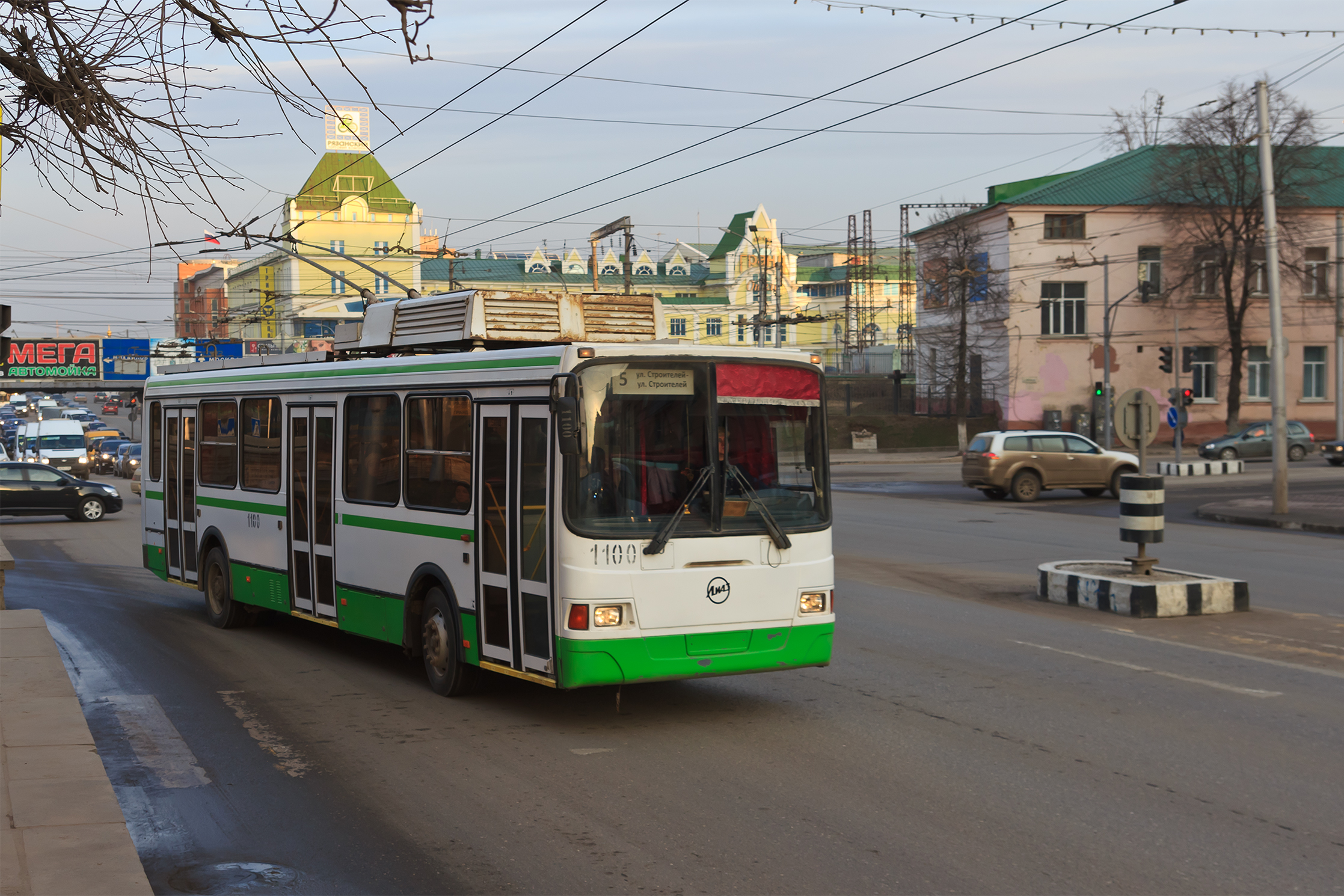
A LiAZ-5280 trolleybus in Ryazan

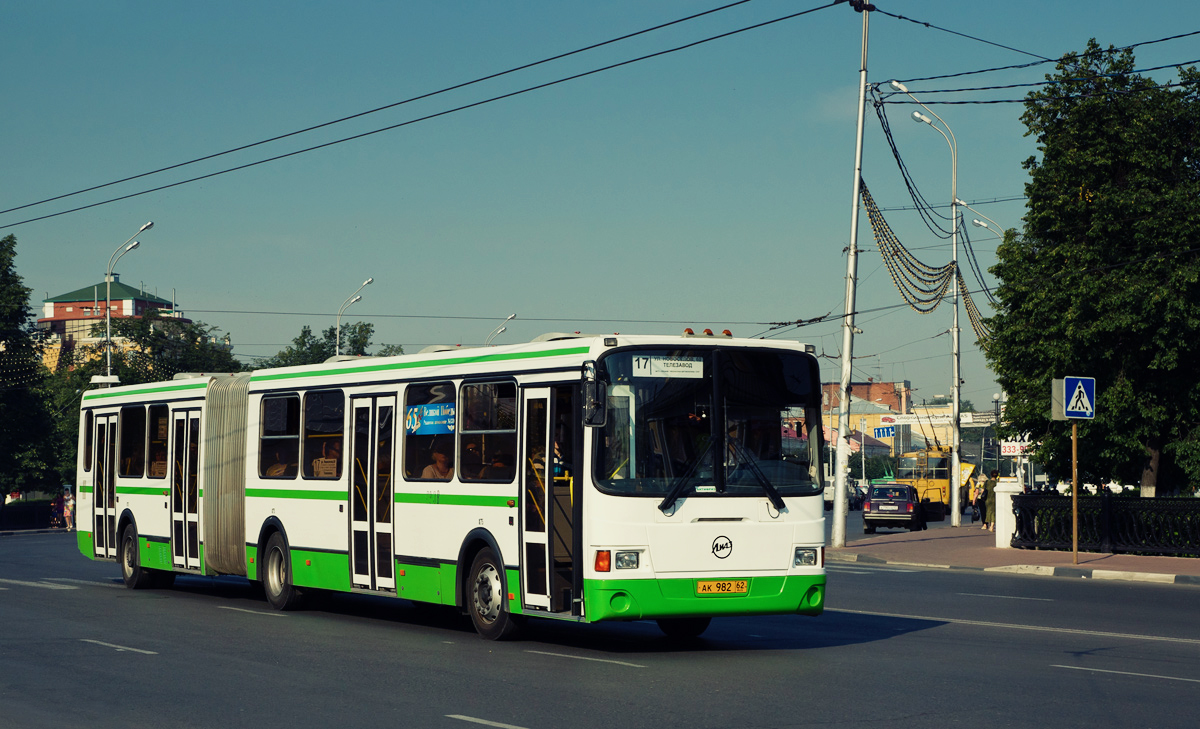
LiAZ-6212 articulated bus

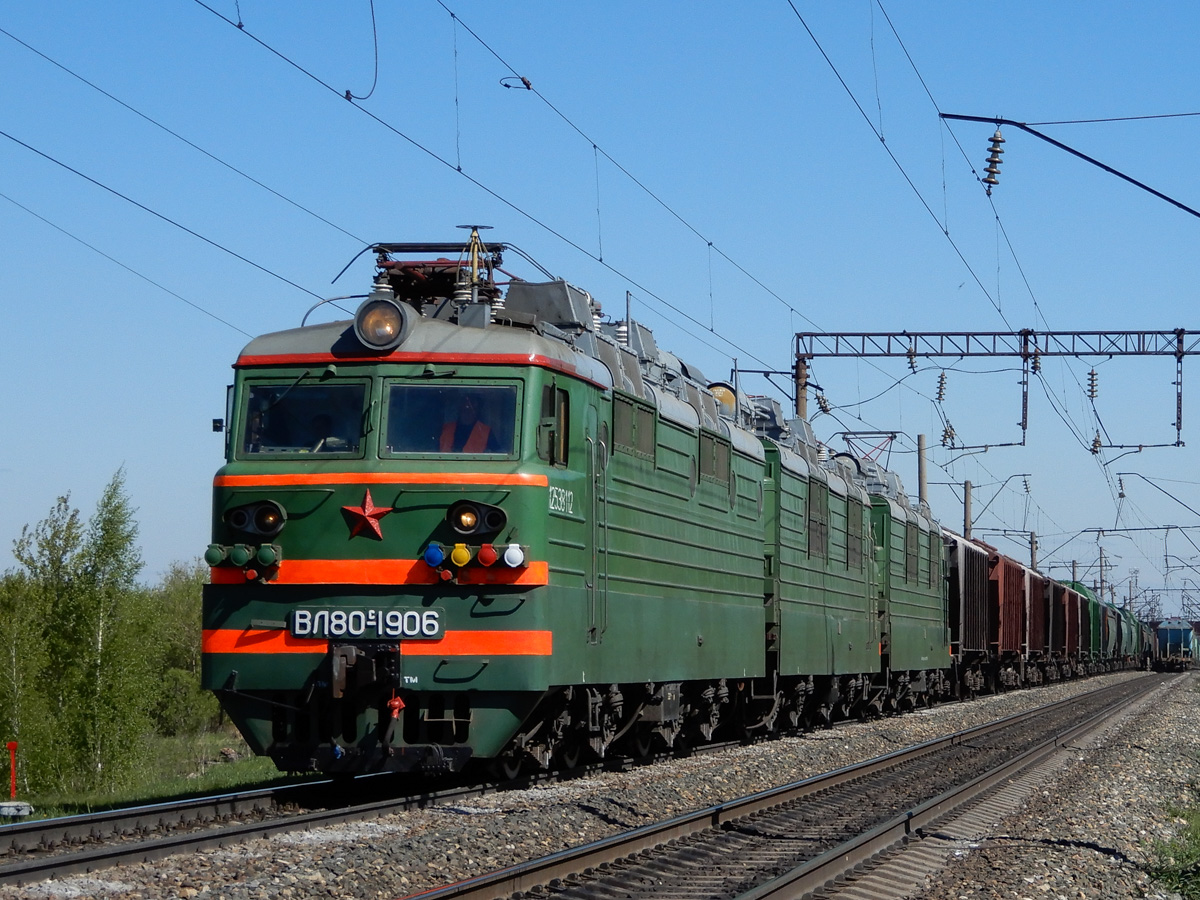
Electric locomotives are common transportation used throughout Russia.

=== Airports ===
The Dyagilevo strategic bomber base is just west of the city, and the Alexandrovo air base is to the southeast, as is Turlatovo Airport.

== Notable people ==
=== Arts ===
- Alexander Alexandrov (1883–1946), composer
- Erast Garin (1902–1980), comic actor
- Alexander Genis (born 1953), writer, broadcaster and cultural critic
- Yuri Kholopov (1932–2003), musicologist, music theorist, doctor of arts, and professor of the Moscow Conservatoire
- Maximilian Kravkov (1887–1937), writer
- Andrei Mironov (born 1975), painter
- Konstantin Paustovsky (1892–1968), writer
- Alexander Pirogov (1899–1964), bass opera singer
- Yakov Polonsky (1819–1898), writer
- Mikhail Saltykov-Shchedrin (1826–1889), satirist
- Aleksandr Solzhenitsyn (1918–2008), writer
- Sergei Yesenin (1895–1925), poet
- Semen Zhivago (1807–1863), historical painter

=== Athletics ===
- Anton Belov (born 1986), professional ice hockey defenceman
- Olga Kaliturina (born 1976), high jumper
- Maria Kalmykova (born 1978), basketball player
- Yuri Kuleshov (born 1981), professional football defensive midfielder
- Irina Meleshina (born 1982), long jumper
- Ivan Nifontov (born 1987), judoka
- Sergei Panov (born 1970), basketball player
- Konstantin Selyavin (born 1974), former Russian professional football player
- Kirill Sosunov (born 1975), long jumper
- Alexandra Trusova (born 2004), figure skater

=== Engineering and science ===
- Andrey Arkhangelsky (1879–1940), geologist
- Victor Balykin (born 1947), Russian physicist
- Vladimir Gulevich (1867–1933), biochemist
- Aleksei Kozhevnikov (1836–1902), neurologist and psychiatrist
- Nikolai Kravkov (1865–1924), pharmacologist
- Sergey P. Kravkov (1873–1938), soil scientist
- Sergey V. Kravkov (1893–1951), psychologist and psychophysiologist
- Nataliia Lebedeva (1894–1978), ethnographer and anthropologist
- Andrey Markov (1856–1922), mathematician
- Ivan Michurin (1855–1935), biologist
- Sergey Nepobedimy (1921–2014), designer of rocket weaponry
- Ivan Pavlov (1849–1936), physiologist
- Konstantin Tsiolkovsky (1857–1935), engineer

=== Others ===
- Dmitry Andreikin (born 1990), chess grandmaster
- Roman Putin (born 1977), businessman
- Lydia Fotiyeva (1881–1975), Bolshevik revolutionary

== Twin towns and sister cities ==
Ryazan is twinned with:

- Alessandria, Italy
- Bressuire, France
- Brest, Belarus
- Genoa, Italy
- Lovech, Bulgaria
- Münster, Germany
- (Georgia (country)) New Athos, Georgia
- Ostrów Mazowiecka, Poland
- Xuzhou, China

== Sources ==
- Рязанская областная Дума. Закон №128-ОЗ от 12 сентября 2007 г. «Об административно-территориальном устройстве Рязанской области», в ред. Закона №56-ОЗ от 27 июля 2012 г. «О внесении изменения в статью 7 Закона Рязанской области "Об административно-территориальном устройстве Рязанской области"». Вступил в силу через десять дней после официального опубликования. Опубликован: "Рязанские ведомости", №273, 20 сентября 2007 г. (Ryazan Oblast Duma. Law #128-OZ of September 12, 2007 On the Administrative-Territorial Structure of Ryazan Oblast, as amended by the Law #56-OZ of July 27, 2012 On Amending Article 7 of the Law of Ryazan Oblast "On the Administrative-Territorial Structure of Ryazan Oblast". Effective as of the day ten days after the official publication.).
- Рязанская областная Дума. Закон №75-ОЗ от 7 октября 2004 г. «О наделении муниципального образования — город Рязань статусом городского округа и установлении его границ», в ред. Закона №77-ОЗ от 9 июля 2008 г «Об утверждении границы муниципального образования — городской округ город Рязань». Вступил в силу со дня официального опубликования. Опубликован: "Рязанские ведомости", №212–213, 14 октября 2004 г. (Ryazan Oblast Duma. Law #75-OZ of October 7, 2004 On Granting Urban Okrug Status to the Municipal Formation of the City of Ryazan and on Establishing Its Borders, as amended by the Law #77-OZ of July 9, 2008 On Establishing the Border of the Municipal Formation—the Urban Okrug of the City of Ryazan. Effective as of the day of the official publication.).
- Рязанская областная Дума. Закон №74-ОЗ от 7 октября 2004 г. «О наделении муниципального образования — Рязанский район статусом муниципального района, об установлении его границ и границ муниципальных образований, входящих в его состав», в ред. Закона №45-ОЗ от 9 апреля 2008 г «Об утверждении границы муниципального образования — Рязанский муниципальный район и границ муниципальных образований, входящих в его состав». Вступил в силу со дня официального опубликования. Опубликован: "Рязанские ведомости", №212–213 (без приложений), 14 октября 2004 г. (Ryazan Oblast Duma. Law #74-OZ of October 7, 2004 On Granting the Municipal Formation of Ryazansky District the Status of a Municipal District, on Establishing Its Borders and the Borders of the Municipal Formations It Comprises, as amended by the Law #45-OZ of April 9, 2008 On Establishing the Border of the Municipal Formation of Ryazansky Municipal Districts and the Borders of the Municipal Formations It Comprises. Effective as of the day of the official publication.).
