= 2024 Volgograd Oblast gubernatorial election =

2024 gubernatorial election in Russia

← 2019	6–8 September 2024	2029 →
- Turnout: 65.71%
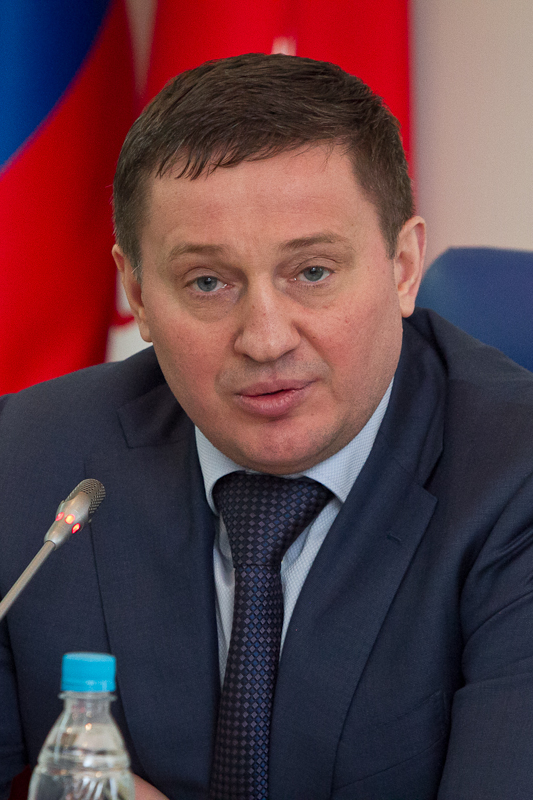
		CPRF	LDPR
Candidate	Andrey Bocharov	Oleg Dmitriyev	Aleksey Kononenko
Party	United Russia	CPRF	LDPR
Popular vote	872,010	85,729	58,757
Percentage	79.68%	7.83%	5.37%
Governor before election
Andrey Bocharov
United Russia
Governor-elect
Andrey Bocharov
United Russia

The 2024 Volgograd Oblast gubernatorial election took place on 6–8 September 2024, on common election day, coinciding with 2024 Volgograd Oblast Duma election. Incumbent Governor Andrey Bocharov was re-elected to a third term in office.

== Background ==
Then-All-Russia People's Front executive committee chairman and former State Duma member Andrey Bocharov was appointed acting Governor of Volgograd Oblast in April 2014, replacing first-term Governor Sergey Bozhenov, who served in office for just two years. Bocharov easily won the election for a full term in September 2014 with 88.49% of the vote. Bocharov ran for a second term in 2019 and overwhelmingly won again with 76.80% of the vote against three registered opponents.

Initially the Governor of Volgograd Oblast was limited for just two consecutive terms so Bocharov would have been term-limited in 2024. However, in December 2021 "On Common Principles of Organisation of Public Authority in the Subjects of the Russian Federation" law was enacted, which lifted term limits for Russian governors. Volgograd Oblast followed suit and lifted the restrictions, which allowed Bocharov to seek another term in 2024.

In April 2024 during a meeting with President Vladimir Putin Governor Bocharov announced his intention to run for a third term and received Putin's endorsement.

== Candidates ==
In Volgograd Oblast candidates for Governor can be nominated only by registered political parties. Candidate for Governor of Volgograd Oblast should be a Russian citizen and at least 30 years old. Candidates for Governor should not have a foreign citizenship or residence permit. Each candidate in order to be registered is required to collect at least 5% of signatures of members and heads of municipalities. Also gubernatorial candidates present 3 candidacies to the Federation Council and election winner later appoints one of the presented candidates.

=== Declared ===
Candidate name, political party		Occupation	Status	Ref.
Andrey Bocharov; United Russia	Andrey Bocharov	Incumbent Governor of Volgograd Oblast (2014–present)	Registered	
Oleg Dmitriyev; Communist Party		Aide to Volgograd Oblast Duma member Former member of Volgograd Oblast Electoral Commission (2021–2024)	Registered	
Yevgeny Karelikov; Party of Pensioners		Member of Volgograd Oblast Duma (2019–present)	Registered	
Aleksey Kononenko; Liberal Democratic Party		Gas rescue specialist Perennial candidate	Registered	
Aleksey Vasyutenko; SR–ZP		Member of Volgograd City Duma (2023–present); Businessman	Registered	

=== Candidates for Federation Council ===
Gubernatorial candidate, political party	Candidates for Federation Council	Status
Andrey Bocharov; United Russia	* Galina Generalova, Director of the Volgograd Medical College * Aleksandr Kolesnichenko, agriculture businessman * Nikolai Semisotov, incumbent Senator (2019–present)	Registered
Oleg Dmitriyev; Communist Party	* Aleksey Burov, Member of Volgograd Oblast Duma (2014–present), 2019 gubernatorial election * Valery Mogilny, Member of Volgograd Oblast Duma (2019–present) * Denis Uskov, Member of Krasnoslobodsk City Duma (2019–present), school principal	Registered
Yevgeny Karelikov; Party of Pensioners	* Dmitry Ignatov, self-employed * Anton Kalyuzhny, businessman * Viktor Yefremenkov, unemployed	Registered
Aleksey Kononenko; Liberal Democratic Party	* Yekaterina Donskova, aide to Volgograd Oblast Duma member * Aleksandr Kuzmin, Member of Volgograd Oblast Duma (2019–present) * Yulia Rubleva, unemployed	Registered
Aleksey Vasyutenko; SR–ZP	* Vladimir Borodin, manager * Natalya Cherkasova, businesswoman * Vadim Filin, conservative activist	Registered

== Finances ==
All sums are in rubles.

Financial Report	Source	Bocharov	Dmitriyev	Karelikov	Kononenko	Vasyutenko
First		32,364	26,399	26,910	501,250	25,091
Final		TBD	TBD	TBD	TBD	TBD

== Results ==
Summary of the 6–8 September 2024 Volgograd Oblast gubernatorial election results
Candidate	Party	Votes	%
Andrey Bocharov (incumbent)	United Russia	872,010	79.68
Oleg Dmitriyev	Communist Party	85,729	7.83
Aleksey Kononenko	Liberal Democratic Party	58,757	5.37
Yevgeny Karelikov	Party of Pensioners	38,224	3.49
Aleksey Vasyutenko	A Just Russia – For Truth	24,769	2.26
Valid votes		1,079,489	98.63
Blank ballots		14,928	1.36
Total		1,094,452	100.00
Turnout		1,094,452	61.71
Registered voters		1,773,458	100.00

Governor Bocharov re-appointed incumbent Senator Nikolai Semisotov (United Russia) to the Federation Council.

== See also ==
- 2024 Russian regional elections
