= Astrakhan constituency =

Russian legislative constituency in Astrakhan Oblast

Astrakhan single-member constituency
- Constituency of the Russian State Duma

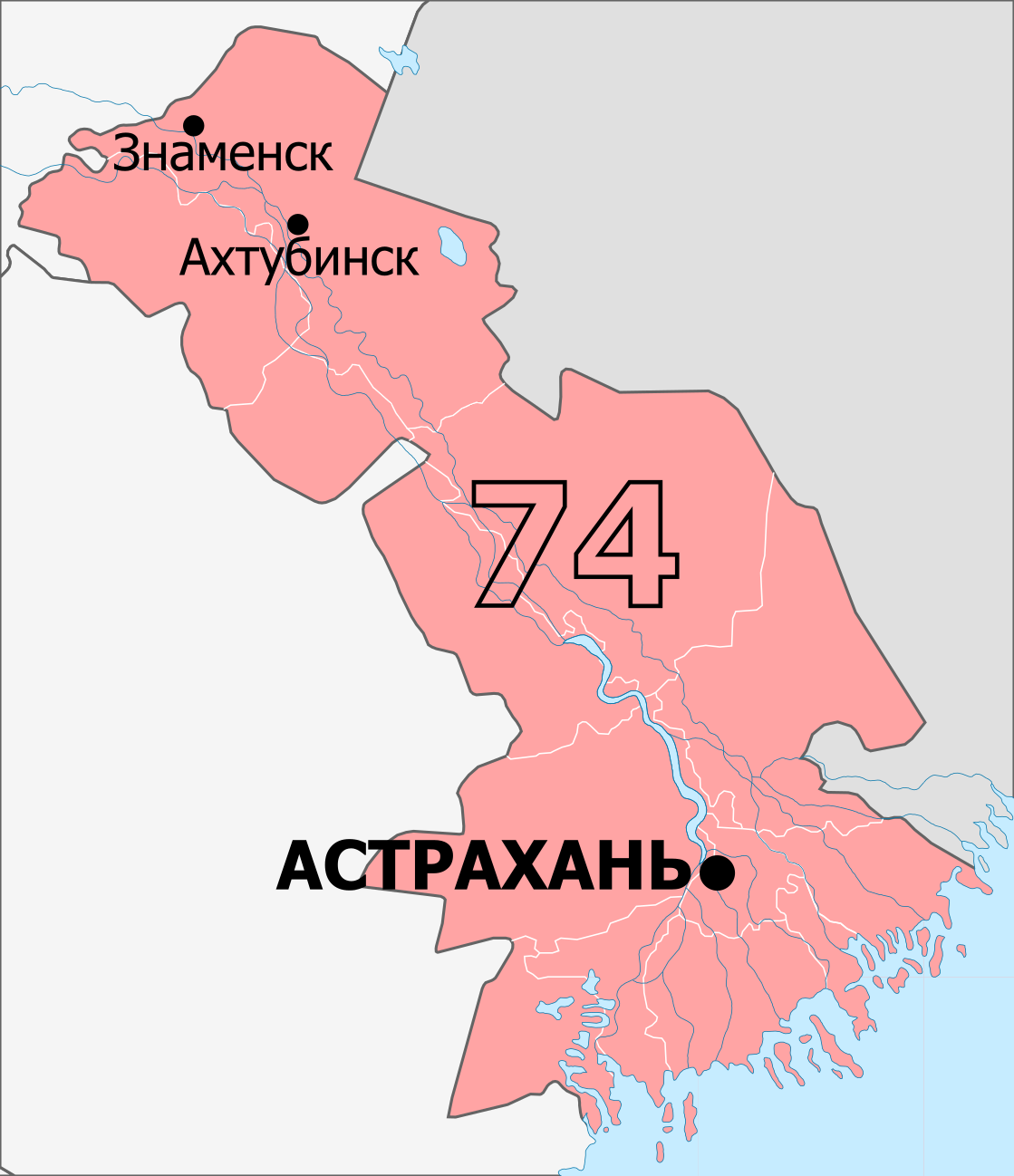
- Deputy: Rinat Ayupov; United Russia
- Federal subject: Astrakhan Oblast
- Districts: Akhtubinsky, Astrakhan, Chernoyarsky, Ikryaninsky, Kamyzyaksky, Kharabalinsky, Krasnoyarsky, Limansky, Narimanovsky, Privolzhsky, Volodarsky, Yenotayevsky, Znamensk
- Voters: 701,056 (2026)

The Astrakhan constituency (No.78 (Note: No.62 in 1993-1995, No.61 in 1995-2003, No.63 in 2003-2007, No.74 in 2016–2026)) is a Russian legislative constituency in Astrakhan Oblast. The constituency encompasses the entire territory of Astrakhan Oblast.

The constituency has been represented since 2026 by United Russia deputy Rinat Ayupov, two-term State Duma member and logistics businessman, who won the open seat after three-term United Russia incumbent Leonid Ogul successfully sought re-election on the party list.

== Boundaries ==
1993–2007, 2016–present: Akhtubinsky District, Astrakhan, Chernoyarsky District, Ikryaninsky District, Kamyzyaksky District, Kharabalinsky District, Krasnoyarsky District, Limansky District, Narimanovsky District, Privolzhsky District, Volodarsky District, Yenotayevsky District, Znamensk
The constituency has been covering the entirety of Astrakhan Oblast since its initial creation in 1993.

== Members elected ==
Election	Member	Party
1993	Vladislav Vinogradov	Independent
1995	Vyacheslav Zvolinsky	Independent
1999	Oleg Shein	Independent
2003	Oleg Shein	Independent
2007	Proportional representation - no election by constituency	
2011	Proportional representation - no election by constituency	
2016	Leonid Ogul	United Russia
2021	Leonid Ogul	United Russia
2026	Rinat Ayupov	United Russia

== Election results ==
=== 1993 ===
Summary of the 12 December 1993 Russian legislative election in the Astrakhan constituency
Candidate	Party	Votes	%
Vladislav Vinogradov	Independent	64,028	17.56%
Aleksandr Saushin	Party of Russian Unity and Accord	57,858	15.86%
Vladimir Muravyev	Independent	50,081	13.73%
Galina Chubkova	Women of Russia	36,350	9.97%
Yury Poldnikov	Communist Party	29,123	7.98%
Konstantin Markelov	Future of Russia–New Names	22,422	6.15%
Marsel Valiyev	Yavlinsky–Boldyrev–Lukin	10,141	2.78%
Sergey Terskov	Civic Union	8,390	2.30%
Yevgeny Pokrovsky	Kedr	7,509	2.06%
Vladimir Larionov	Dignity and Charity	5,012	1.37%
against all		40,412	11.08%
Total		364,723	100%

=== 1995 ===
Summary of the 17 December 1995 Russian legislative election in the Astrakhan constituency
Candidate	Party	Votes	%
Vyacheslav Zvolinsky	Independent	106,850	23.46%
Vladislav Vinogradov (incumbent)	Independent	74,022	16.25%
Dmitry Babaytsev	Liberal Democratic Party	41,810	9.18%
Yury Kagakov	Our Home – Russia	40,742	8.95%
Anver Almayev	Independent	36,234	7.96%
Galina Chubkova	Women of Russia	22,111	4.86%
Oleg Shein	Communists and Working Russia - for the Soviet Union	20,579	4.52%
Natalia Osukhova	Democratic Choice of Russia – United Democrats	17,492	3.84%
Vyacheslav Tonkikh	Independent	15,551	3.41%
Andrey Melnikov	Independent	10,068	2.21%
Valery Alekseyev	Ivan Rybkin Bloc	8,669	1.90%
Dzhanbek Sultanov	Independent	8,291	1.82%
Vladimir Koznov	Serving Russia	4,632	1.02%
Sergey Chaplygin	Independent	3,430	0.75%
Nina Poverina	Independent	2,963	0.65%
Gennady Shchetinin	Independent	1,935	0.42%
Viktor Repin	Independent	1,419	0.31%
against all		27,666	6.08%
Total		455,385	100%

=== 1999 ===
Summary of the 19 December 1999 Russian legislative election in the Astrakhan constituency
Candidate	Party	Votes	%
Oleg Shein	Independent	97,247	21.47%
Nikolay Arefyev	Communist Party	86,399	19.07%
Anver Almayev	Independent	74,265	16.39%
Sergey Bozhenov	Yabloko	64,086	14.15%
Svetlana Kudryavtseva	Independent	58,229	12.85%
Oleg Sarychev	Independent	12,942	2.86%
Igor Negerev	Russian Socialist Party	9,922	2.19%
Boris Karpachev	Independent	3,718	0.82%
Aleksandr Mikhaylov	Independent	3,116	0.69%
Sergey Chunosov	Russian Party	1,490	0.33%
against all		32,474	7.17%
Total		453,040	100%

=== 2003 ===
Summary of the 7 December 2003 Russian legislative election in the Astrakhan constituency
Candidate	Party	Votes	%
Oleg Shein (incumbent)	Independent	142,654	35.85%
Sergey Bozhenov	Independent	90,244	22.68%
Nikolay Arefyev	Communist Party	39,687	9.97%
Leonid Ogul	United Russia	38,409	9.65%
Anver Almayev	Great Russia–Eurasian Union	16,541	4.16%
Eduard Nedelko	Independent	13,834	3.48%
Dmitry Ugryumov	Liberal Democratic Party	9,158	2.30%
Viktor Shlyakhov	Agrarian Party	7,032	1.77%
Nuria Kurmaliyeva	People's Party	3,264	0.82%
Boris Karpachev	Democratic Party	2,310	0.58%
Boris Shuvarin	Social Democratic Party	1,758	0.44%
against all		26,333	6.62%
Total		398,238	100%

=== 2016 ===
Summary of the 18 September 2016 Russian legislative election in the Astrakhan constituency
Candidate	Party	Votes	%
Leonid Ogul	United Russia	103,739	38.74%
Oleg Shein	A Just Russia	88,257	32.95%
Nikolay Arefyev	Communist Party	30,281	11.31%
Yegor Vostrikov	Liberal Democratic Party	17,543	6.55%
Yegor Kovalev	Communists of Russia	6,236	2.33%
Nailya Nikitina	Party of Growth	4,690	1.75%
Mikhail Doliyev	People's Freedom Party	3,263	1.22%
Sergey Rodionov	The Greens	2,848	1.06%
Total		267,812	100%

=== 2021 ===
Summary of the 17-19 September 2021 Russian legislative election in the Astrakhan constituency
Candidate	Party	Votes	%
Leonid Ogul (incumbent)	United Russia	149,701	47.81%
Oleg Shein	A Just Russia — For Truth	60,101	19.20%
Khalit Aitov	Communist Party	31,074	9.93%
Aivar Abeldayev	New People	10,847	3.46%
Karen Grigoryan	Rodina	8,826	2.82%
Roman Sultanov	Communists of Russia	8,551	2.73%
Larisa Samodayeva	Party of Pensioners	6,974	2.23%
Rustam Shuabasov	Liberal Democratic Party	6,366	2.03%
Darya Matveyeva	Russian Party of Freedom and Justice	5,505	1.76%
Alyona Gubanova	Civic Platform	5,068	1.62%
Dmitry Anufriyev	Yabloko	4,171	1.33%
Nailya Nikitina	Party of Growth	2,763	0.88%
Aleksandr Plokhov	The Greens	2,339	0.75%
Total		313,088	100%

=== 2026 ===
Summary of the 18-20 September 2026 Russian legislative election in the Astrakhan constituency
Candidate	Party	Votes	%
Rinat Ayupov	United Russia	204,843	50.96%
Timofey Shcherbakov	Liberal Democratic Party	62,970	15.66%
Sergey Sevastyanov	Communist Party	37,786	9.40%
Sergey Lampadov	New People	28,846	7.18%
Maria Lidzhiyeva	A Just Russia	27,448	6.83%
Vladimir Sukharev	Rodina	17,728	4.41%
Larisa Samodayeva	Party of Pensioners	16,003	3.98%
Total		401,986	100%
