= 2012 Russian regional elections =

- 4 March 2012; 14 October 2012

5 heads of federal subjects 6 regional parliaments
- Regions where a gubernatorial election took place are highlighted in red. Regions where a parliamentary election took place are highlighted in blue.

Regional elections were held in 2012 in eleven federal subjects of Russia, first on 4 March, and then on 14 October. These were the first elections where governors were elected since 2005.

== Gubernatorial elections ==
Gubernatorial elections in Amur, Belgorod, Bryansk, Novgorod and Ryazan were held on 14 October. In all five regions, United Russia won with at least 64% of the vote.

== Legislative elections ==
Elections for regional parliaments were held on 14 October in 6 federal subjects of Russia. Parties clearing the electoral threshold (varying from 5% to 7% in each region) are highlighted.

Legislature	Voting system	Party-list results					District seats	Majority
Legislature	Voting system	UR	CPRF	LDPR	SR	Other (Note: Only parties that crossed the threshold are included.)	District seats	Majority
North Ossetia, Parliament	Parallel (35 PR + 35 TRS) (Note: Runoff election was held in 11 districts on 11 November 2012.)	44.20% (18)	10.48% (4)	1.33%	7.17% (2)	PoR 26.57% (11)	General: UR 19, SR 3, PoR 1, Ind 1 Runoff: UR 7, PoR 2, CPRF 1, Ind 1	44 / 70
Udmurtia, State Council	Parallel (45 PR + 45 FPTP) (Note: Total 90 seats, down from 100 in previous election.)	53.19% (29)	17.23% (9)	10.08% (6)	5.07% (1)	—	UR 38, CPRF 2, Ind 5	67 / 90
Krasnodar Krai, Legislative Assembly	Parallel (50 PR + 50 FPTP) (Note: Total 100 seats, up from 70 in previous election.)	69.47% (45)	8.98% (5)	4.56%	4.15%	—	UR 50	95 / 100
Penza Oblast, Legislative Assembly	Parallel (18 PR + 18 FPTP)	70.64% (16)	12.52% (2)	4.61%	2.87%	—	UR 18	34 / 36
Sakhalin Oblast Duma	Parallel (14 PR + 14 FPTP)	50.18% (9)	18.33% (3)	8.36% (1)	7.17% (1)	—	UR 12, Ind 2	21 / 28
Saratov Oblast Duma	Parallel (23 PR + 22 FPTP) (Note: Total 45 seats, up from 36 in previous election.)	77.92% (21)	8.27% (1)	2.83%	5.01% (1)	—	UR 22	43 / 45
Total (incl. district seats)	369 seats	304	27	7	8	23	—	304 / 369

== Mayoral elections ==
The table includes capital cities of federal subjects (9) and urban okrugs with 100,000+ inhabitants.

City	Date	Incumbent	Incumbent since	Candidates	Result
Arkhangelsk, Arkhangelsk Oblast	4 March	Viktor Pavlenko	2008	✓ Viktor Pavlenko (Ind) 50.18%; Vasily Badanin (SR) 22.48%; Nadezhda Vinogradova (CPRF) 17.12%; Larisa Sergeyeva (LDPR) 7.33%	Incumbent re-elected.
Astrakhan, Astrakhan Oblast	4 March	Sergey Bozhenov (resigned); Mikhail Stolyarov (acting)	2004	✓ Mikhail Stolyarov (UR) 60.00%; Oleg Shein (SR) 29.96%	Acting mayor elected for a full term.
Cherepovets, Vologda Oblast	4 March	Oleg Kuvshinnikov (resigned)	2007	✓ Yury Kuzin (Ind) 54.35%; Yury Burov (CPRF) 20.84%; Aleksandr Kozyrev (LDPR) 10.56%; Pavel Dolgodvorov (Ind) 8.74%	New mayor elected to a vacant position.
Gorno-Altaysk, Altai Republic	4 March	Viktor Oblogin	1992	✓ Viktor Oblogin (UR) 53.65%; Viktor Romashkin (CPRF) 37.41%	Incumbent re-elected.
Kamensk-Uralsky, Sverdlovsk Oblast	4 March	Mikhail Astakhov	2008	✓ Mikhail Astakhov (UR) 74.02%; Dmitry Zavyalov (SR) 19.56%	Incumbent re-elected.
Kamyshin, Volgograd Oblast	4 March	Aleksandr Chunakov	2004	✓ Aleksandr Chunakov (Ind) 42.16%; Aleksandr Khatsenko (SR) 38.38%	Incumbent re-elected.
Naryan-Mar, Nenets AO	4 March	Yury Rodionovsky	2008	✓ Tatyana Fyodorova (CPRF) 39.61%; Yury Rodionovsky (Ind) 23.63%; Matvey Chuprov (Ind) 11.28%; Aleksandr Lutovinov (Ind) 10.68%; Yelena Lyapunova (Ind) 7.49%	Incumbent lost re-election. New mayor elected.
Novokuybyshevsk, Samara Oblast	4 March	Oleg Volkov	2007	✓ Andrey Konovalov (UR) 61.01%; Boris Lyakhov (CPRF) 24.11%; Yevgenia Dubnitskaya (LDPR) 6.46%; Andrey Golikov (Ind) 5.13%	Incumbent did not stand for re-election. New mayor elected.
Taganrog, Rostov Oblast	4 March	Nikolay Fedyanin	2003	✓ Vladimir Prasolov (SR) 38.69%; Nikolay Fedyanin (UR) 29.21%; Viktor Bulgakov (CPRF) 28.52%	Incumbent lost re-election. New mayor elected.
Tolyatti, Samara Oblast	4 March (first round)	Anatoly Pushkov	2008	Aleksandr Shakhov (UR) 36.49%; Sergey Andreyev (Ind) 32.31%; Andrey Serafimov (CPRF) 10.67%; Borislav Grinblat (Ind) 5.47%; Mikhail Maryakhin (SR) 5.44%	Incumbent did not stand for re-election. New mayor elected.
Tolyatti, Samara Oblast	18 March (runoff)	Anatoly Pushkov	2008	✓ Sergey Andreyev (Ind) 56.94%; Aleksandr Shakhov (UR) 40.06%	Incumbent did not stand for re-election. New mayor elected.
Yakutsk, Sakha (Yakutia)	4 March	Yury Zabolev (resigned); Igor Nikiforov (acting)	2007	✓ Aysen Nikolayev (UR) 47.73%; Vladimir Fyodorov (Ind) 25.11%; Anatoly Kyrdzhagasov (SR) 18.06%; Gennady Mikheyev (CPRF) 5.89%	New mayor elected to a vacant position.
Yaroslavl, Yaroslavl Oblast	4 March (first round)	Viktor Volonchunas	1991	Yevgeny Urlashov (Ind) 40.25%; Yakov Yakushev (Ind) 27.12%; Vyacheslav Blatov (SR) 23.72%; Aleksey Molodtsov (LDPR) 5.04%	Incumbent did not stand for re-election. New mayor elected.
Yaroslavl, Yaroslavl Oblast	1 April (runoff)	Viktor Volonchunas	1991	✓ Yevgeny Urlashov (Ind) 69.65%; Yakov Yakushev (Ind) 27.78%	Incumbent did not stand for re-election. New mayor elected.
Yessentuki, Stavropol Krai	4 March	Konstantin Skomorokhin (resigned)	2003	✓ Larisa Pisarenko (UR) 56.72%; Valery Smolyakov (CPRF) 17.93%; Timofey Kononov (SR) 13.93%; Yury Nadyktov (Ind) 6.13%	New mayor elected to a vacant position.
Zlatoust, Chelyabinsk Oblast	20 May	Aleksandr Karavayev (resigned)	2009	✓ Vyacheslav Zhilin (UR) 47.34%; Raisa Istomina (Ind) 23.67%; Valery Uskov (Ind) 16.62%	New mayor elected to a vacant position.
Krasnoyarsk, Krasnoyarsk Krai	10 June	Pyotr Pimashkov (resigned); Edkham Akbulatov (acting)	1996	✓ Edkham Akbulatov 69.37%; Aleksey Podkorytov 12.03%; Aleksandr Koropachinsky 11.33%	Acting mayor elected for a full term.
Omsk, Omsk Oblast	17 June	Viktor Schreider (resigned); Tatyana Vizhevitova (acting)	2005	✓ Vyacheslav Dvorakovsky (UR) 49.35%; Viktor Zharkov (CPRF) 28.97%; Irina Overina (SR) 6.40%	New mayor elected to a vacant position.
Angarsk, Irkutsk Oblast	14 October	Vladimir Zhukov (mayor–chairman of the Duma); Anton Medko (city manager)	2010	✓ Vladimir Zhukov (Ind) 43.64%; Sergey Petrov (Ind) 32.94%; Sergey Brenyuk (CPRF) 14.43%	Executive mayoralty re-created. New mayor elected.
Kaliningrad, Kaliningrad Oblast	14 October	Alexander Yaroshuk	2007	✓ Alexander Yaroshuk (UR) 56.62%; Yury Galanin (CPRF) 13.59%; Yevgeny Gan (PoR) 12.23%	Incumbent re-elected.
Khimki, Moscow Oblast	14 October	Vladimir Strelchenko (resigned)	2005	✓ Oleg Shakhov (Ind) 47.61%; Yevgeniya Chirikova (Ind) 17.59%; Oleg Mitvol (AZ–NP) 14.45%; Leonid Vinogradov (CPRF) 8.17%; Sergey Troitsky (Ind) 2.46%	New mayor elected to a vacant position.
Nizhny Tagil, Sverdlovsk Oblast	14 October	Valentina Isayeva	2008	✓ Sergey Nosov (UR) 92.35%; Aleksey Kubasov (CPRF) 2.35%	Incumbent did not stand for re-election. New mayor elected.
Novocherkassk, Rostov Oblast	2 December	Anatoly Kondratenko (resigned)	2010	✓ Vladimir Kirgintsev (Ind) 48.27%; Anatoly Volkov (Ind) 16.31%; Vladimir Nadtoka (CPRF) 14.74%; Andrey Kutyrev (Ind) 9.60%	New mayor elected to a vacant position.

== See also ==
- 2012 Russian presidential election
