= 2024 Volgograd Oblast Duma election =

2024 Russian regional elections

- 6–8 September 2024

All 38 seats in the Oblast Duma 20 seats needed for a majority
- Turnout: 61.70% ▲20.48 pp
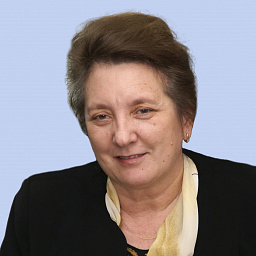

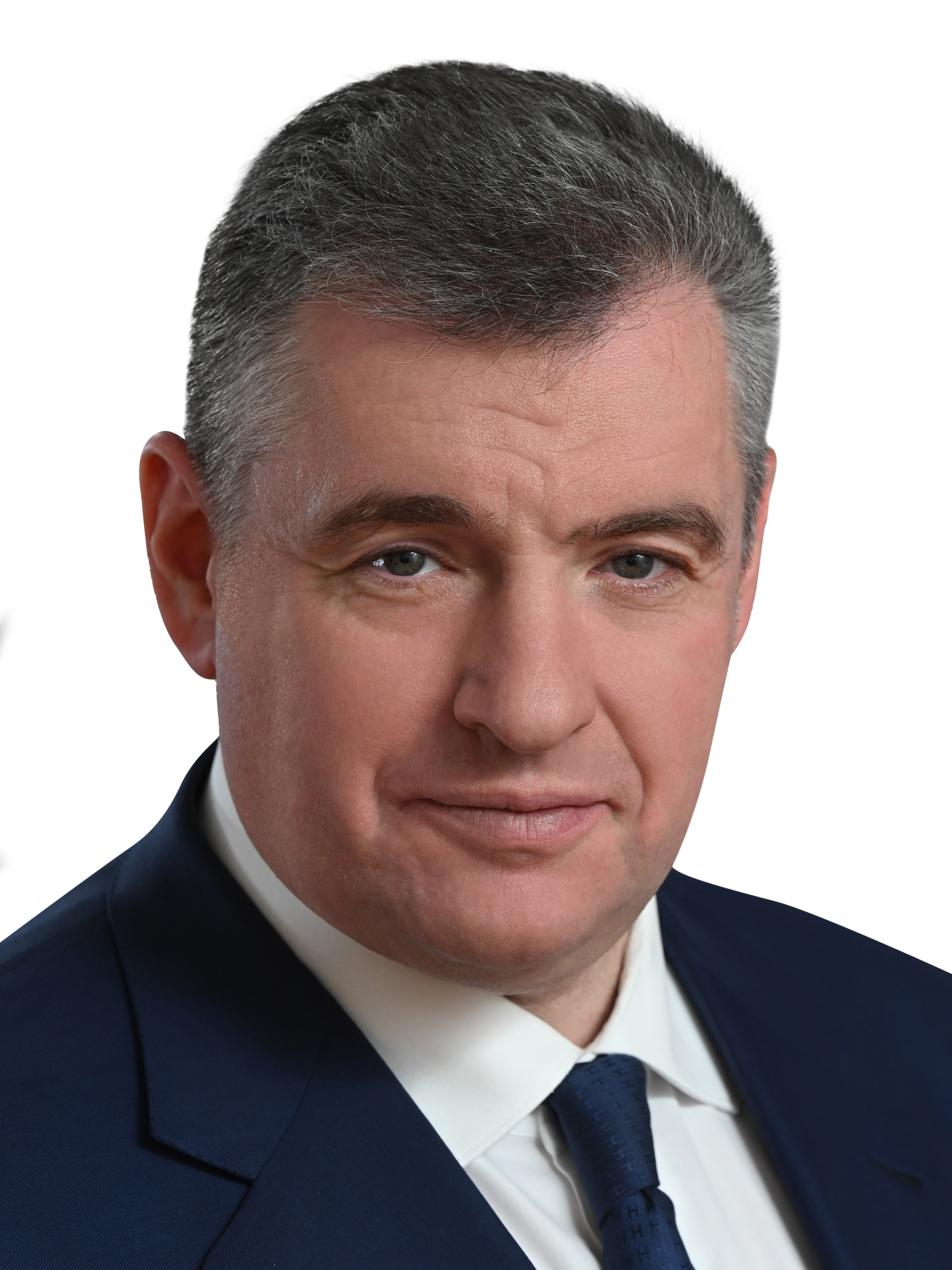
	Majority party	Minority party	Third party
	UR
Candidate	Anna Gantseva	Tamara Golovachyova	Leonid Slutsky
Party	United Russia	CPRF	LDPR
Last election	48.15%, 28 seats	19.50%, 5 seats	14.85%, 2 seats
Seats won	28	4	2
Seat change	Steady	▼1	Steady
Popular vote	573,816	179,841	142,118
Percentage	52.44%	16.44%	12.99%
Swing	▲4.29 pp	▼3.06 pp	▼1.86 pp
	Fourth party	Fifth party	Sixth party
	SR-ZP	NL	RPPSS
Candidate	Dmitry Kalashnikov	Samvel Avetisyan	Yevgeny Karelikov
Party	SR-ZP	New People	Party of Pensioners
Last election	8.44%, 2 seats	Did not exist	6.34%, 1 seat
Seats won	1	1	1
Seat change	▼1	Did not exist	Steady
Popular vote	60,169	56,574	55,999
Percentage	5.50%	5.17%	5.12%
Swing	▼2.94 pp	Did not exist	▼1.22 pp
Chairman before election
Aleksandr Bloshkin
United Russia
Elected Chairman
Aleksandr Bloshkin
United Russia

The 2024 Volgograd Oblast Duma election took place on 6–8 September 2024, on common election day, coinciding with 2024 Volgograd Oblast gubernatorial election. All 38 seats in the Oblast Duma were up for reelection.

United Russia retained its overwhelming majority in the Oblast Duma, winning 52% of the vote. The election produced relatively small changes with New People entering the Duma being the most significant.

== Electoral system ==
Under current election laws, the Oblast Duma is elected for a term of five years, with parallel voting. 19 seats are elected by party-list proportional representation with a 5% electoral threshold, with the other half elected in 19 single-member constituencies by first-past-the-post voting. Seats in the proportional part are allocated using the Imperiali quota, modified to ensure that every party list, which passes the threshold, receives at least one mandate.

== Candidates ==
=== Party lists ===
To register regional lists of candidates, parties need to collect 0.5% of signatures of all registered voters in Volgograd Oblast.

The following parties were relieved from the necessity to collect signatures:

- United Russia
- Communist Party of the Russian Federation
- A Just Russia — Patriots — For Truth
- Liberal Democratic Party of Russia
- New People
- Russian Party of Pensioners for Social Justice

No.	Party	Oblast-wide list	Candidates	Territorial groups	Status
1	Liberal Democratic Party	Leonid Slutsky • Aleksey Loginov • Aleksandr Kuzmin	55	19	Registered
2	United Russia	Anna Gantseva • Sergey Chetverikov • Aleksandr Korotkov	60	19	Registered
3	A Just Russia – For Truth	Dmitry Kalashnikov • Shakhbaz Davidov • Aleksey Vasyutenko	59	19	Registered
4	New People	Samvel Avetisyan • Igor Kapustin • Vasily Kuchmiyev	48	18	Registered
5	Communist Party	Tamara Golovachyova • Oleg Dmitriyev	44	19	Registered
6	Party of Pensioners	Yevgeny Karelikov • Dmitry Ignatov	22	10	Registered

New People took part in Volgograd Oblast legislative election for the first time.

=== Single-mandate constituencies ===
19 single-mandate constituencies were formed in Volgograd Oblast. To register candidates in single-mandate constituencies need to collect 3% of signatures of registered voters in the constituency.

Number of candidates in single-mandate constituencies
Party	Candidates	
Party	Nominated	Registered
United Russia	19	17
Communist Party	19	19
Liberal Democratic Party	19	17
A Just Russia – For Truth	17	17
Party of Pensioners	1	1
New People	14	12
Russian All-People's Union	1	0
Independent	1	1
Total	91	84

== Polls ==
Fieldwork date	Polling firm	UR	CPRF	LDPR	SR-ZP	NL	RPPSS
7–8 September 2024	2024 election	52.4	16.4	13.0	5.5	5.2	5.1
17–25 August 2024	Russian Field	52.3	12.8	13.5	6.3	8.5	5.2
8 September 2019	2019 election	48.2	19.5	14.9	8.4	–	6.3

== Results ==
=== Results by party lists ===
Summary of the 6–8 September 2024 Volgograd Oblast Duma election results
Party	Party list					Constituency		Total	
Party	Votes	%	±pp	Seats	+/–	Seats	+/–	Seats	+/–
United Russia	573,816	52.44	▲4.29	11	Steady	17	Steady	28	Steady
Communist Party	179,841	16.44	▼3.06	3	▼1	1	Steady	4	▼1
Liberal Democratic Party	142,118	12.99	▼1.86	2	Steady	0	Steady	2	Steady
A Just Russia — For Truth	60,169	5.50	▼2.94	1	Steady	0	▼1	1	▼1
New People	56,574	5.17	New	1	New	0	New	1	New
Party of Pensioners	55,999	5.12	▼1.22	1	Steady	0	Steady	1	Steady
Independents	–	–	–	–	–	1	▲1	1	▲1
Invalid ballots	25,636	2.34	▼0.38	—	—	—	—	—	—
Total	1,094,154	100.00	—	19	Steady	19	Steady	38	Steady
Turnout	1,094,154	61.70	▲20.48	—	—	—	—	—	—
Registered voters	1,773,357	100.00	—	—	—	—	—	—	—

Aleksandr Bloshkin (United Russia) was re-elected as Chairman of the Oblast Duma, while incumbent Senator Sergei Gornyakov (United Russia) was re-appointed to the Federation Council.

=== Results in single-member constituencies ===
==== District 1 ====
Summary of the 6–8 September 2024 Volgograd Oblast Duma election in Uryupinsky constituency No.1
Candidate	Party	Votes	%
Dmitry Popolitov	United Russia	32,551	47.87%
Valery Mogilny	Communist Party	13,371	19.66%
Aleksandr Nekhayev	Liberal Democratic Party	9,740	14.32%
Vasily Bochkov	A Just Russia — For Truth	6,792	9.99%
Timirbulat Ayubov	New People	4,730	6.96%
Total		67,994	100%

==== District 2 ====
Summary of the 6–8 September 2024 Volgograd Oblast Duma election in Novoanninsky constituency No.2
Candidate	Party	Votes	%
Yury Maramygin	United Russia	37,873	56.04%
Yury Skorokhodov	Communist Party	14,485	21.43%
Nikolay Renskov	A Just Russia — For Truth	14,094	20.85%
Total		67,687	100%

==== District 3 ====
Summary of the 6–8 September 2024 Volgograd Oblast Duma election in Mikhaylovsky constituency No.3
Candidate	Party	Votes	%
Larisa Gordiyenko (incumbent)	United Russia	32,038	49.75%
Vladimir Ivanov	Communist Party	10,301	16.00%
Artyom Boronin	Liberal Democratic Party	10,083	15.66%
Dmitry Nikitin	A Just Russia — For Truth	6,187	9.61%
Aleksandr Ivanov	New People	5,128	7.96%
Total		64,396	100%

==== District 4 ====
Summary of the 6–8 September 2024 Volgograd Oblast Duma election in Zhirnovsky constituency No.4
Candidate	Party	Votes	%
Aleksandr Shevchenko	United Russia	31,881	51.56%
Sergey Minayev	Liberal Democratic Party	11,147	18.03%
Aleksandr Tarapata	Communist Party	10,122	16.37%
Shakhbaz Davidov	A Just Russia — For Truth	7,572	12.25%
Total		61,829	100%

==== District 5 ====
Summary of the 6–8 September 2024 Volgograd Oblast Duma election in Gorodishchensky constituency No.5
Candidate	Party	Votes	%
Ivan Samokhin	United Russia	28,464	52.01%
Artyom Grigoryev	Communist Party	7,839	14.32%
Aleksandr Ashmarin	Liberal Democratic Party	7,204	13.16%
Andrey Gorbunov	A Just Russia — For Truth	5,142	9.40%
Nina Somova	New People	4,721	8.63%
Total		54,730	100%

==== District 6 ====
Summary of the 6–8 September 2024 Volgograd Oblast Duma election in Kalachevsky constituency No.6
Candidate	Party	Votes	%
Tatyana Rasputina (incumbent)	Independent	26,712	48.85%
Ivan Bondarev	A Just Russia — For Truth	9,816	17.95%
Yelena Tyupa	Communist Party	8,733	15.97%
Aleksey Volotskov	Liberal Democratic Party	7,334	13.41%
Total		54,685	100%

==== District 7 ====
Summary of the 6–8 September 2024 Volgograd Oblast Duma election in Kamyshinsky constituency No.7
Candidate	Party	Votes	%
Dmitry Krikunov (incumbent)	United Russia	28,938	55.15%
Yevgeny Podaruyev	Communist Party	7,025	13.39%
Yevgeny Malygin	Liberal Democratic Party	6,642	12.66%
Sergey Bekhterev	A Just Russia — For Truth	6,565	12.51%
Yevgeny Fisher	New People	2,982	5.68%
Total		52,467	100%

==== District 8 ====
Summary of the 6–8 September 2024 Volgograd Oblast Duma election in Pallasovsky constituency No.8
Candidate	Party	Votes	%
Sergey Bulgakov	United Russia	28,342	57.19%
Mikhail Cherkesov	Communist Party	10,541	21.27%
Sergey Mitin	A Just Russia — For Truth	6,377	12.87%
Damir Abulkhatinov	New People	3,074	6.20%
Total		49,555	100%

==== District 9 ====
Summary of the 6–8 September 2024 Volgograd Oblast Duma election in Sredneakhtubinsky constituency No.9
Candidate	Party	Votes	%
Mikhail Struk (incumbent)	United Russia	32,873	60.87%
Vladimir Durnovtsev	Communist Party	11,155	20.66%
Valery Mun	Liberal Democratic Party	5,418	10.03%
Aleksandr Tsabybin	A Just Russia — For Truth	3,457	6.40%
Total		54,005	100%

==== District 10 ====
Summary of the 6–8 September 2024 Volgograd Oblast Duma election in Volzhsky constituency No.10
Candidate	Party	Votes	%
Dmitry Grigorov	United Russia	25,861	49.60%
Lyubov Sputanova	Communist Party	8,984	17.23%
Vladimir Komarovsky	Liberal Democratic Party	7,399	14.19%
Aleksandra Solovyova	Party of Pensioners	3,404	6.53%
Aleksey Lebedev	A Just Russia — For Truth	3,347	6.42%
Anton Mulakhanov	New People	2,428	4.66%
Total		52,134	100%

==== District 11 ====
Summary of the 6–8 September 2024 Volgograd Oblast Duma election in Volzhsky constituency No.11
Candidate	Party	Votes	%
Maria Apletalina	United Russia	24,607	48.52%
Yefim Buzyakov	Communist Party	8,511	16.78%
Aleksandr Anokhin	Liberal Democratic Party	8,357	16.48%
Maksim Stebenkov	New People	4,256	8.39%
Marina Oleynikova	A Just Russia — For Truth	4,215	8.31%
Total		50,718	100%

==== District 12 ====
Summary of the 6–8 September 2024 Volgograd Oblast Duma election in Traktorozavodsky constituency No.12
Candidate	Party	Votes	%
Igor Romanov	United Russia	24,025	42.97%
Dmitry Yeremin	Communist Party	11,814	21.13%
Valery Dolgov	Liberal Democratic Party	9,796	17.52%
Yevgeny Sobolevsky	A Just Russia — For Truth	5,989	10.71%
Zakhar Nemov	New People	3,692	6.60%
Total		55,911	100%

==== District 13 ====
Summary of the 6–8 September 2024 Volgograd Oblast Duma election in Krasnooktyabrsky constituency No.13
Candidate	Party	Votes	%
Aleksandr Nelepin	United Russia	22,663	45.19%
Vladislav Nikonenko	Liberal Democratic Party	11,856	23.64%
Anton Guzev	Communist Party	11,846	23.62%
Andrey Rublev	New People	2,393	4.77%
Total		50,153	100%

==== District 14 ====
Summary of the 6–8 September 2024 Volgograd Oblast Duma election in Dzerzhinsky constituency No.14
Candidate	Party	Votes	%
Andrey Tayev (incumbent)	United Russia	30,149	50.98%
Aleksandr Piotukhovich	Communist Party	9,524	16.10%
Roman Sokolov	Liberal Democratic Party	7,973	13.48%
Pavel Kotlyarov	A Just Russia — For Truth	5,362	9.07%
Aleksandr Purgin	New People	4,395	7.43%
Total		59,142	100%

==== District 15 ====
Summary of the 6–8 September 2024 Volgograd Oblast Duma election in Dzerzhinsky constituency No.15
Candidate	Party	Votes	%
Irina Solovyova (incumbent)	United Russia	40,481	61.90%
Vyacheslav Shapovalov	Communist Party	11,754	17.81%
Olga Saburkina	Liberal Democratic Party	8,806	13.35%
Sergey Bukhov	A Just Russia — For Truth	1,937	2.94%
Total		65,979	100%

==== District 16 ====
Summary of the 6–8 September 2024 Volgograd Oblast Duma election in Tsentralny constituency No.16
Candidate	Party	Votes	%
Tamara Golovachyova	Communist Party	19,360	38.16%
Nikita Tulnev	Liberal Democratic Party	12,260	24.17%
Aleksandr Pugachev	A Just Russia — For Truth	10,028	19.77%
Vasily Kuchmiyev	New People	8,286	16.33%
Total		50,731	100%

==== District 17 ====
Summary of the 6–8 September 2024 Volgograd Oblast Duma election in Sovetsky constituency No.17
Candidate	Party	Votes	%
Ruslan Sharifov (incumbent)	United Russia	31,507	53.02%
Vitaly Shlyakin	Liberal Democratic Party	11,316	19.04%
Aleksey Burov	Communist Party	11,157	18.78%
Mikhail Kuznetsov	A Just Russia — For Truth	3,621	6.09%
Total		59,422	100%

==== District 18 ====
Summary of the 6–8 September 2024 Volgograd Oblast Duma election in Kirovsky constituency No.18
Candidate	Party	Votes	%
Stanislav Korotkov (incumbent)	United Russia	30,265	51.22%
Vyacheslav Leninsky	Communist Party	12,512	21.18%
Aleksey Kononenko	Liberal Democratic Party	7,690	13.01%
Vitaly Kravtsov	A Just Russia — For Truth	7,616	12.89%
Total		59,088	100%

==== District 19 ====
Summary of the 6–8 September 2024 Volgograd Oblast Duma election in Krasnoarmeysky constituency No.19
Candidate	Party	Votes	%
Igor Vorobyov	United Russia	25,768	50.31%
Denis Ponomarev	Communist Party	12,486	24.38%
Anna Kobtseva	Liberal Democratic Party	9,016	17.60%
Yekaterina Andreyeva	New People	2,776	5.42%
Total		51,220	100%

=== Members ===
Incumbent deputies are highlighted with bold, elected members who declined to take a seat are marked with ~~strikethrough~~.

Constituency
No.	Member	Party
1	Dmitry Popolitov	United Russia
2	Yury Maramygin	United Russia
3	Larisa Gordiyenko	United Russia
4	Aleksandr Shevchenko	United Russia
5	Ivan Samokhin	United Russia
6	Tatyana Rasputina	Independent
7	Dmitry Krikunov	United Russia
8	Sergey Bulgakov	United Russia
9	Mikhail Struk	United Russia
10	Dmitry Grigorov	United Russia
11	Maria Apletalina	United Russia
12	Igor Romanov	United Russia
13	Aleksandr Nelepin	United Russia
14	Andrey Tayev	United Russia
15	Irina Solovyova	United Russia
16	Tamara Golovachyova	Communist Party
17	Ruslan Sharifov	United Russia
18	Stanislav Korotkov	United Russia
19	Igor Vorobyov	United Russia

Party lists
Member	Party
Anna Gantseva	United Russia
Sergey Chetverikov	United Russia
Aleksandr Korotkov	United Russia
Sergei Gornyakov	United Russia
Aleksandr Bloshkin	United Russia
~~Nikolai Semisotov~~	United Russia
Natalya Semyonova	United Russia
~~Anna Kuvychko~~	United Russia
~~Vladimir Marchenko~~	United Russia
Vladimir Shkarin	United Russia
Nadezhda Kuleshova	United Russia
Oleg Dmitriyev	Communist Party
Valery Mogilny	Communist Party
Denis Uskov	Communist Party
~~Leonid Slutsky~~	Liberal Democratic Party
Aleksey Loginov	Liberal Democratic Party
Dmitry Kalashnikov	A Just Russia – For Truth
Samvel Avetisyan	New People
Yevgeny Karelikov	Party of Pensioners

== See also ==
- 2024 Russian elections
