= Mikhail Stolyarov =

Russian politician

- Михаил Столяров

4th Mayor of Astrakhan
- In office 16 March 2012 – 22 November 2013
- Preceded by: Sergey Bozhenov
- Succeeded by: Irina Yegorova (acting)

Mayor of Astrakhan (acting)
- In office 20 December 2011 – 16 March 2012

Personal details
- Born: Mikhail Nikolayevich Stolyarov; 19 October 1953 (age 72) Vozhskoye, Russian SFSR, Soviet Union
- Party: United Russia (excluded as of 2015)

Mikhail Nikolayevich Stolyarov (Russian: Михаил Николаевич Столяров; born on 19 October 1953) is a Russian politician who had served as the mayor of Astrakhan from 2011 to 2013.

From 2009 to 2011 he was the vice-mayor of the Astrakhan.

From 2001 to 2009, he was a member of the Duma of the Astrakhan Oblast.

From 1999 to 2009, he was the Astrakhanenergo enterprise.

== Bigraghpy ==
Mikhail Stolyarov was born on 19 October 1953 in Volzhskoye of the Narimanov district of the Astrakhan Oblast to the family of bakers.

After school, Stolyarov graduated from the Astrakhan Radio Engineering College and in 1972, by distribution, and began working as a shop controller at the Brest Mechanical Plant (Belarusian SSR). He was soon drafted into the Soviet army and served in the Air Defense Forces in Lithuania.

=== Work in the energy sector ===
After the end of military service in 1974, Stolyarov got a job as an electrician at the Astrakhan Electric Networks enterprise, where he later held the positions of an electrical substation duty officer, foreman, substation head and substation group head.

In 1990, Stolyarov graduated from the Novocherkassk Polytechnic Institute with a degree in Power Supply to Industrial Enterprises in Cities and Agriculture. In 1994, he became the director of the Astrakhan electrical networks of OAO Astrakhanenergo, and in 1999, "with the support of a four thousandth team of power engineers," he took the post of general director of OAO.

While heading Astrakhanenergo, Stolyarov began his political career in 2001, as he was elected to the Duma of Astrakhan Oblast. He retained his place as a regional Duma deputy even after the elections in 2006. In the regional parliament, Stolyarov was a member of the committee on budgetary, financial, economic, tax policy and property, and was a member of the United Russia faction.

In parallel with his work in the regional Duma and Astrakhanenergo, Stolyarov continued to receive education: in 2003 he graduated from Saratov State University (specialty - "Management of Organizations") and the Academy of National Economy under the Government of Russia.

In 2007, during the restructuring of RAO UES of Russia, Astrakhanenergo was first subordinated to the Interregional Distribution Grid Company IDGC of Center and North Caucasus, and a little later, IDGC of the South.

Stolyarov held the position of Deputy General Director of IDGC of Center and North Caucasus JSC - Managing Director of Astrakhanenergo JSC in 2007, and then from 2007 to 2008, he was Deputy General Director of IDGC of the South JSC - Managing Director of Astrakhanenergo JSC, and from 2008 to 2009, he was the managing director of Astrakhanenergo as a branch of IDGC of the South, JSC.

=== Further political career ===
In 2009, Mayor of Astrakhan Sergey Bozhenov was re-elected, and in the same month, he appointed Stolyarov as his deputy in charge of housing and communal services and energy (according to other sources, economics and finance.)

Having received a new position, Stolyarov left various energy companies and the regional Duma.

In the elections held on 4 December 2011, Stolyarov was once again elected to the Astrakhan Regional Duma from the Chernoyarsk region, but refused the oath. At the federal parliamentary elections held on the same day, Bozhenov, as a candidate from United Russia, received a mandate as a member of the State Duma. On 17 January 2012, after the resignation of Anatoly Brovko, Bozhenov was appointed acting head of the Volgograd Oblast. In February 2012, Bozhenov became the 4th governor of the Volgograd Oblast.

At the same time, Stolyarov was appointed acting mayor of Astrakhan and United Russia nominated him for the early mayoral elections.

According to the official results of the voting held on 4 March 2012, Stolyarov won more than 60% of the votes, and his main rival, the representative of the A Just Russia party - Oleg Shein, whom he won 30% of the votes. Immediately after the announcement of the results, Shein and his closest supporters announced large-scale fraud, and then went on a hunger strike, demanding the cancellation of the election results.

The hunger strike of the ex-candidate and his associates, as well as the protests that accompanied it, received a wide public outcry. Well-known opposition figures Alexei Navalny and Ilya Yashin, as well as the leaders of A Just Russia, including the head of the Just Russia faction in the State Duma, Sergey Mironov, arrived in Astrakhan to support Shein.

On 16 March 2012, Stolyarov officially took office as the mayor of Astrakhan. On the same day, Shein filed a formal lawsuit to cancel the election results. Stolyarov, commenting on the filing of a statement of claim by his rival, said that he would obey the court decision, but was not going to "submit to the will of one person." In June 2012, the Kirovsky District Court of Astrakhan refused to cancel the results of the mayoral election.

=== Corruption allegations ===
On 13 November 2013, Stolyarov was detained by the Ministry of Internal Affairs as part of a criminal case being investigated by the Investigative Committee. He is charged with extorting a bribe in the amount of 10 million rubles and a 25 percent share of the enterprise from a merchant for allocating a plot for the construction of a building. On the same day, he was taken by plane to Moscow for further investigative actions.

According to the report of the Research Institute of Corruption Problems, Stolyarov let work in the city economy take its course, and the actions of a number of his subordinates became the subject of investigations. According to Shein, more than half of Stolyarov's deputies are either under arrest, wanted, or have already been convicted of various crimes.

On 13 November 2013, the Basmanny Court of Moscow authorized the arrest of Stolyarov. While under arrest, he appointed Irina Yegorova, head of the legal department of the Astrakhan administration, deputy mayor for legal support, as acting head of Astrakhan.

On 20 November 2013, Stolyarov was charged with taking a bribe on an especially large scale.

On 22 November by decision of the Basmanny Court of Moscow, he was removed from the post of Mayor of Astrakhan.

On 10 January 2014, the Basmanny Court of Moscow decided to extend the arrest of the ex-mayor of Astrakhan until 13 March 2014. The court later extended this for another two months until 13 May 2014.

On 18 April 2014, the Kirovsky District Court of Astrakhan began to consider the merits of the criminal case. On 23 April, a series of court sessions was interrupted due to a sharp deterioration in the health of the defendant: he was taken directly from the court building to the intensive care unit of the regional clinical hospital. The hearings were adjourned until 13 May. However, the trial was then postponed for another two days due to the fact that the patient is still in the hospital. “Mikhail Stolyarov continues to be hospitalized. The court session is tentatively rescheduled for Thursday, May 15,” the secretary of the court announced. The defendant's lawyer explained that at the moment Stolyarov was transferred from the intensive care unit (reanimation) to a separate guarded ward, where he continues to undergo treatment.

On 26 June 2014, the hearings on the criminal case of Stolyarov were to be resumed in the Kirovsky District Court. It however didn't happen due to the exacerbation of his diabetes, and the court decided to postpone the case. Stolyarov at that time was in the medical unit of colony No. 2.

On 4 July 2014 Stolyarov was still hospitalized in the city clinical hospital Kirov with exacerbation of diabetes mellitus.

On 12 August 2014, Stolyarov was discharged from the hospital, according to the head physician of the Kirov Clinical Hospital Fyodor Orlov, saying that Stolyarov's condition has stabilized, and there is no threat to his life.

On 21 August 2014, hearings on the criminal case of Mikhail Stolyarov resumed at the Kirovsky District Court of Astrakhan after an almost two-month break. “We consider it necessary to establish whether Stolyarov’s diseases are included in the list of serious diseases that prevent the accused from being detained in custody, as well as preventing the serving of a sentence. In the second petition, we ask you to consider the possibility of changing the preventive measure in connection with the health of our client,” said lawyer Aleksandr Moiseyenko. The public prosecutor did not support any of the motions. “Stolyarov is still undergoing treatment, and it is premature to talk about final diagnoses. In addition, Stolyarov is present here, his preventive measure is appropriate,” said the prosecutor. The judge denied all motions.

On 27 August 2014, the next court session took place. The defense had continued to provide evidence. During the meeting Stolyarov became ill, at the request of the defendant, an ambulance was called to the courthouse. After examination by doctors, Mikhail Stolyarov was diagnosed with unstable angina pectoris and arterial hypertension. The accused mayor was hospitalized in the Alexander-Mariinsky Regional Clinical Hospital.

On 21 October 2014, a regular hearing was held in the case of ex-mayor of Astrakhan Stolyarov, as the case resumed. Stolyrarov, during the court session on Tuesday, stated, “I do not consider myself guilty of a crime. I refuse to testify in connection with the violation of my rights by the court. Due to the fact that my defenders and I personally were not provided with the appearance in court of the key witness Khvalyk. In this regard, the interrogation of the witness in court was not completed.”

On 24 October, another session was held in the Kirovsky District Court. In turn, the state prosecutor petitioned for the seizure of a package of 90,750 shares of VKA-Bank, owned by Stolyarov. The prosecutor asked the ex-mayor to apply a penalty in the form of 10 years in a strict regime colony and a fine of 500 million rubles. Stolyarov may also be banned from holding public office for three years.

On 31 October, the verdict in the case of Stolyarov is to be pronounced. “Today, there will be no verdict in this criminal case. The judge is still in the deliberation room, tentatively the sentencing has been postponed to November 5, ”the court said.

On 5 November 2014, the Kirovsky District Court of Astrakhan sentenced the dismissed mayor of the city, Mikhail Stolyarov, accused of taking a bribe, to 10 years in a strict regime colony and a fine of 500 million rubles. Judge Natalya Senchenko stated in court that the court found the defendant's guilty. She stressed that the defendant did not admit his guilt and refused to testify in court, Interfax reports. The judge stressed that the state of health of the defendant and a positive characterization is a mitigating circumstance in sentencing, while the aggravating circumstance is the public danger of the crime.

On 18 November 2014, a meeting was scheduled in the Kirovsky District Court on the division of property of the Stolyarov family.

On 8 December 2014, the Astrakhan Regional Court received an appeal from Stolyarov.

On 25 December 2014, the Judicial Collegium of the Astrakhan Regional Court reduced sentence term by one year, which makes the imprisonment 9 years.

On 16 January 2015, Aleksandr Klykanov, the chairman of the branch, said at a meeting of the political council of the Astrakhan regional branch of United Russia, said the Stolyarov was expelled from the party.

On 4 February 2015, the ex-official's lawyer Sergey Kutushev said that the cassation appeal would be sent to the regional court. He did not specify the exact timing of the complaint. According to Kutushev, Stolyarov's quarantine has ended and he is serving his sentence in correctional colony No. 6.

On January 13, 2016, Stolyarov again filed a cassation appeal. “The cassation appeal has been received and is now under consideration. The judge can reject the complaint or satisfy it, in the latter case, the sentence, which has already entered into force, will be reviewed,” they said to the court.

=== Appeals to the sentence ===
On 4 February 2021, the ex-mayor of Astrakhan, Stolyarov, convicted of bribes on an especially large scale, petitions for the replacement of the remaining, unserved term of imprisonment with a milder form of punishment. According to the publication, the materials were submitted for consideration at the end of 2020. The hearings in the case of Stolyarov were repeatedly postponed. The next meeting was scheduled for 3 February. Its results are not yet known.

On March 2, 2021, Stolyarov, was released 2.8 years ahead of schedule. This became possible after Stolyarov's defense petitioned the Sovetsky District Court to replace the remaining term with a milder form of punishment. The petition was submitted at the end of 2020, and on 15 February 2021, the appeal was granted was granted.

== Personal life ==
Stolyarov is married and has two sons. In the past, he went in for sports, while studying at a technical school he was a champion in athletics decathlon.

Stolyarov himself reported that in his free time he likes to hunt waterfowl, and also spends time in the country, where he is engaged in floriculture.
