= Russian elections, 2012 =

The term Russian elections, 2012 may refer to –

- Russian presidential election, March 2012
- Russian regional elections, Oct 2012
- Russian gubernatorial elections, Oct 2012
- Russian opposition election, Oct 2012 – an internet poll organized by Russia's opposition parties and activists.

See also –

- Russian legislative election, December 2011, the protests surrounding which continued well into 2012.
