= Khimprom =

Khimprom may refer to:

- Khimprom (Volgograd) in Volgograd, Russia
- Cheboksary Khimprom in Novocheboksarsk, Russia
