= Sergey Bozhenov =

Russian politician (born 1965)

- Сергей Боженов
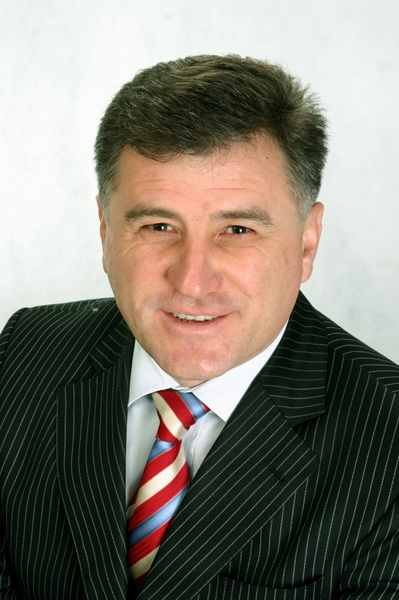

4th Governor of Volgograd Oblast
- In office 2 February 2012 – 4 April 2014
- Preceded by: Anatoly Brovko
- Succeeded by: Andrey Bocharov

Member of the State Duma
- In office 4 December 2011 – 2 February 2012

3rd Mayor of Astrakhan
- In office 18 December 2004 – 20 December 2011
- Preceded by: Igor Bezrukavnikov
- Succeeded by: Mikhail Stolyarov

Personal details
- Born: 8 April 1965 (age 61) Chamlykskaya, Labinsky District, Krasnodar Krai, Russian SFSR, Soviet Union
- Party: United Russia
- Other political affiliations: Yabloko
- Spouse: Olga Vladimirovna Bozhenova

Sergey Anatolyevich Bozhenov (Russian: Сергей Анатольевич Боженов; born 8 April 1965), is a Russian politician who had served as the 4th Governor of Volgograd Oblast from 2012 to 2014.

He also served as a member of the State Duma from 2011 to 2012, and the 3rd mayor of Astrakhan from 2004 to 2011.

During his career, he was a member of the parties "Yabloko", the Russian Party of Life, "United Russia" and others.

== Biography ==
=== Early life ===
Sergey Bozhenov was born in Chamlykskaya on 8 April 1965. After the death of his parents in 1978, he was brought up in an orphanage. In 1980, he entered the Astrakhan GPTU-9, specializing in a “minder-sailor”. In 1983 he entered the Astrakhan River School, specializing in navigation. From 1986 to 1992, he worked as a boatswain on foreign vessels. From 1993 to 1997, he worked at small businesses.

In 1997, Bozhenov was elected a deputy of the Astrakhan regional representative assembly. In the AOPS, he became the chairman of the standing commission on the problems of small and medium-sized businesses.

In 1999, he graduated from the law faculty of the Astrakhan State Pedagogical University, and in 2000, he graduated with honors from the Russian Academy of Public Administration under the President of Russia with a degree in State and Municipal Administration. In 2002, he graduated with honors from the Saratov State Social and Economic University (Department of Finance and Credit). PhD in Political Science as of 2007. Honorary Professor of the Astrakhan State Technical University in 2010.

In October 2001, he was re-elected to the Duma of Astrakhan Oblast and became the chairman of the committee on state policy, legality, law and order and security.

=== Mayor of Astrakhan ===
On 18 December 2004, Bozhenov became the 3rd mayor of Astrakhan. Bozhenov's stay at the head of the city administration was marked by conflicts with the regional leadership and election scandals (observers and members of election commissions were expelled from the polling stations by some "fighters"). According to opponents, the ex-mayor's family owns a large amount of real estate in Astrakhan, and areas for the construction of some objects that were needed by Bozhenov or his family appeared many times in a very strange way, as residential buildings burned out in the right places.

The mayor's press service assessed the results of Bozhenov's activities in the city positively: “How he decorated the city, how many new holidays he came up with - the day of the watermelon, the day of the fish soup! Astrakhan entered the Russian Book of Records with the longest cake and the largest round dance around the Kremlin!"

During the first three years of the city's leadership, the revenue flow to the budget of Astrakhan more than doubled: from 4.7 billion rubles in 2004, to 10.4 billion rubles in 2007. Under Bozhenov's leadership, all main highways were repaired in Astrakhan, the program "From the outskirts to the center" was launched, within the framework of which a massive repair of intra-quarter and intra-courtyard roads began, as well as the installation of children's and sports grounds, of which more than three hundred were built. . During Bozhenov's term in Astrakhan, a situation developed in which supporters of his opponent Oleg Shein were beaten by unknown people. In addition, a number of fires occurred in the city, in which 28 people died, and the territories under these houses were subsequently sold by the mayor's office for building: “Since he headed Astrakhan, the situation in the city has become more complicated: the Russian population began to leave it, their houses burned, and shopping centers began to be erected in their place. By coincidence, the land under the burnt buildings was transferred to the mayor's wife Olga Bozhenova for commercial construction.".

Under his term, the tram service was eliminated.

=== Member of the State Duma ===
On 4 December 2011, Bozhenov was elected to the State Duma of the sixth convocation from the United Russia party.

=== Governor of Volgograd Oblast ===
On 17 January 2012, after the resignation of Anatoly Brovko, Bozhenov, was appointed by President Dmitry Medvedev as acting head (governor) Volgograd Oblast. In the information space of the region, messages about the negative qualities of Bozhenov immediately began to appear, and some messages were left by residents of Astrakhan. On 30 January, Ivan Novakov, Rector of the Volgograd State Technical University, Academician of the Russian Academy of Sciences and Chairman of the Council of Rectors of Universities of the Volgograd Oblast, sent a letter to the Volgograd Oblast Duma and the regional political council of the United Russia party, in which he asks to postpone the discussion of candidates for the post of head of the region at least until March 2012. According to Novakov, this is necessary because the appointment of Sergei Bozhenov in society would cause an extremely ambiguous reaction, thus undermining the authority of Putin.

On 31 January, President Dmitry Medvedev submitted Bozhenov's candidacy to the Volgograd Oblast Duma for vesting him with the powers of the Governor of Volgograd Oblast.

The Communist Party faction in the Volgograd Oblast Duma announced that it refuses to take part in the meeting scheduled for February 2, where the question of confirming Bozhenov as governor of the region should be considered. In addition to the haste of such a decision, the communists motivated their decision by the fact that February 2 - the Day of the defeat of the fascist troops at Stalingrad - is a special day for Volgograd and the entire region: “This holy holiday for Volgograd residents cannot be combined with any events. An unambiguously memorable date will fade into the background and the main news will be the approval of the head of the region,” Alevtina Aparina, secretary of the regional committee of the Communist Party of the Russian Federation.

On 2 February 2012, by the decision of the members of the Volgograd Oblast Duma, Bozhenov was endowed with the legal powers of the Governor (Head) of Volgograd Oblast. 31 members voted in favor, one abstained, and 6 members from the Communist Party faction refused to vote.

Political scientist Rostislav Turovsky stated: “I think that in this post he will use the same tough management methods as in Astrakhan. The political plan is clear: it must clean up an area that is unfavorable for United Russia. But I have doubts that he will succeed. Local elites are likely to move on to quietly sabotaging his decisions.". A number of other experts believe that the appointment of a representative of another region to the post of head of the region will help to avoid conflicts between representatives of the regional elites.

Alexander Alymov, the chairman of the Astrakhan Movement "Point of Reference", who since 2006 has been in favor of Bozhenov's resignation as Mayor of Astrakhan, on 18 January addressed Volgograd residents with a warning about the consequences of Bozhenov's appointment as governor of the Volgograd Oblast. In particular, it was said about an abnormally high percentage of votes for United Russia, which was confirmed in the subsequent elections.

On 22 February, the Central Election Commission handed over the vacant mandate whom Bozhenov resigned the Duma Mandate to the governor of Astrakhan Oblast, Alexander Zhilkin. He expectedly refused (for the second time after the elections), after which the CEC handed over the vacant mandate to the next in the regional group from the Astrakhan Oblast, Leonid Ogul, the head physician of the Astrakhan clinical maternity hospital.

In early March 2012, Bozhenov submitted to the regional Duma a bill to increase the allowances for high-ranking officials of the regional administration.

In addition, soon after Bozhenov came to the post of head of the regional administration, several expensive foreign-made cars entered the balance of the garage of the regional administration and the regional duma. So, Bozhenov himself and his security were assigned two Mercedes cars, which, as it turned out later, were purchased by Lukoil-Nizhnevolzhsknefteprodukt LLC for 10 million rubles and transferred to the regional administration under a donation agreement. EuroChem-VolgaKaliy LLC donated six Lexus hybrid cars to the administration for 18 million rubles. After the birthdays of Bozhenov and the chairman of the regional government Khramov, new Toyota Land Cruiser 200 and Infiniti appeared in the garage of the regional administration.

Immediately before the presidential elections, Bozhenov appealed to the voters of the region in support of the program of one of the candidates. Although the name of the candidate was not mentioned, the characteristic rhetoric in favor of the inadmissibility of cardinal changes and the course towards stability, warnings against the dashing 90s clearly indicate campaigning in favor of Putin. After the failed Duma elections for United Russia, in the 2008 presidential election, Putin gained 63% in the region. As noted by a number of experts, the sharp change in the voting results is associated with the arrival of a new head of administration. Yevgeny Minchenko expressed the opinion that “Bozhenov is a master of organizing controlled voting”. So, for example, the opposition on the eve of the elections complained about the organization of voting at enterprises, a large number of absentee ballots (50 thousand versus 27 thousand for the president). In addition, the Volgograd Oblast became the leader in terms of the number of those who voted outside the premises for voting (the so-called "voting at home") - this right was used by 15% of voters who took part in the elections, or 193 thousand against 96 thousand in the Duma elections. As political analyst Aleksander Kynev notes, “The usual percentage of voting at home does not exceed 5-6% on average. If we are talking about tens of percent, this is already an obvious use of the administrative resource ”. It is interesting, for example, that in Alekseevsky district a third of voters voted outside the polling stations, and Putin's result was 85%, in Voroshilovsky district of Volgograd 10% of voters voted at home, Putin received 54% of the votes. On 11 March, Bozhenov handed over the keys to the new Toyota cars to the heads of the five districts in which Putin received the highest percentage in the elections. Meanwhile, on 23 March, the mayor of Mikhailovka, Gennady Kozhevnikov, was removed from office by a decree of Bozhenov. The official reason was the mayor's failure to comply with court decisions. At the same time, according to political scientist Konstantin Glushenko, Kozhevnikov's resignation may be directly related to the "failure" of voting in the presidential elections on March 4: 45.98% of voters voted for Vladimir Putin in Mikhailovka - this is the lowest rate in the region. The turnout was 58.6%. After that, Bozhenov began to lobby for a project to merge the city and the district of Mikhailovka.

On 5 April, Bozhenov and a group of regional Duma members flew to Italy, ostensibly to “present the economic potential of the Volgograd Oblast. The departure was made on a charter flight of the Ak Bars Aero airline, the CRJ 200 aircraft. The flight was ordered by the firm "Your Charter". According to experts involved in air transportation, the cost of such a flight is estimated from 80 to 90 thousand dollars. By coincidence, the birthday of the head of the region fell on a trip abroad. The officials settled in a five-star hotel. Alexei Navalny asked the Prosecutor General's Office to find out with whose funds and for what purpose the visit was organized. The Italian press reports that the officials came with their families, and the visit itself takes place in an atmosphere of maximum confidentiality, journalists and photographers are not allowed to see the officials. The journalist Andrei Malgin, who lives there, followed the trip of the Volgograd delegation directly in Italy. Representatives of opposition parties voiced sharp criticism of the visit. Sergei Mironov, the leader of the A Just Russia party, said on the air of the Russia-24 TV channel: "We support the initiative of our colleagues who make a request to the Prosecutor General's Office, because our officials live too beautifully, and we understand at whose expense they live, and we need to put officials in their place.". It is interesting that, for example, members of "A Just Russia" Natalia Latyshevskaya and Sergey Popov, were not afraid of the beautiful life and took part in a working visit to Italy. Vladimir Zhirinovsky, the leader of the Liberal Democratic Party of Russia reiterated: "When appointing governors, you must say: stay at home, do not irritate the people, people have no money.". State Duma member Aparina, turned to Vladimir Putin with a letter in which she asked him to pay attention to the situation in the Volgograd Oblast: "An alarming situation has developed in the Volgograd Oblast associated with the style of leadership of the new governor and chairman of the government." She asked Prime Minister Putin "to take action on these facts and, when speaking in the State Duma, express his position on what happened." On 28 March, Aparina said in a similar letter that “following the March elections, the heads of the five districts that showed the highest results in your support received from the governor for personal use Toyota cars, the purchase of which was allegedly financed by Lukoil. However, no action was taken. Feeling impunity, the new government went further.". The events received a wide response and were discussed, in particular, on Channel One, Russia-24, NTV, and Channel Five. On the night of April 10, the officials returned to Volgograd. Despite the general reluctance to comment on the situation, some participants in the trip tried to explain the purpose of the trip to journalists. At the same time, some delegates spoke about the business nature of the trip, while others claimed that they were on vacation. None of the interviewees could name any firm or enterprise they visited. Bozhenov's birthday, according to officials, was celebrated modestly and without fireworks. Moreover, it was emphasized that such trips will continue in the future. Some of the returnees could not connect even two words, and some, like member of parliament Irina Guseva, threatened bloggers and journalists with the prosecutor's office.

Interestingly, on 9 April, the press service of the head of the regional administration posted on the official website information that Bozhenov allegedly visited the construction site of one of the houses being built to solve the problem of defrauded equity holders. The fact that Bozhenov was in Italy makes the situation comedic, and therefore could not visit the construction sites of Volgograd. The head of the press service of the regional administration Yulia Atopova explained that this event took place a few days before the publication of the news. Bozhenov himself commented on the trip itself to Interfax: "The trip to Italy of a group of Volgograd deputies and members of the regional government was of a private business nature, not a single penny from the budget was spent on it and there are supporting documents for this." In addition, he stated that he does not drink alcohol at all.

The head of the Communist Party faction in the Volgograd Oblast Duma, Nikolay Parshin, suggested that the trip to Italy took place at the expense of the deputies themselves, but said that he had not seen the contracts themselves. Presumably, the deputies paid 70 thousand rubles each, which, given their salaries, is a rather serious amount. In addition, Parshin denied the fact of a trip to Italy by the chairman of the Government of the Volgograd Oblast, Konstantin Khramov.

The Volgograd prosecutor's office found no violations in the April trip of local officials to Italy. As a result of the audit, carried out on behalf of the regional prosecutor's office by the control and accounting chamber of the region, no violations of budgetary legislation were established on this trip.

Soon after Bozhenov's appointment to the post of head of the regional administration, the names of the executive authorities in the region changed: the head of the administration was officially renamed into the governor, and the administration into the government; the post of the chairman of the government appeared. At the same time, Bozhenov has repeatedly stated that key posts in the new government should receive "diamonds" from other regions, and the very change in the structure of governing bodies will have a positive effect on the number of officials. In reality, everything turned out to be the opposite. The hastily appointed Minister of Sports and Tourism Timur Kasimov and the Minister of Industry Maksim Kletin did not work in their posts for a month. Meanwhile, they did not leave the Volgograd Oblast, but moved to the rank of advisers to the governor. Munira Shabanova, a member of the State Duma of the Astrakhan Oblast, also works as an advisor to the governor in the Volgograd Oblast. The process of growth in the number of officials continues, for whom new premises are required.

After coming to the post of head of the region, Bozhenov promised to elect the head of Volgograd by April 1, then the date was postponed to autumn 2012, and then to 2013 altogether. At the same time, forceful methods of pressure on the city duma were used. So, for the forced delivery of the deputies to the meeting hall, ambulances were used, and Bozhenov himself suggested using "handcuffs" for this.

In early May, a rally was held on Lenin Square, at which demands were made for the resignation of Bozhenov. The rally was timed to coincide with 100 days of being in the chair of the head of the region, Bozhenov, more than 100 people came to it. It is noteworthy that at the same time supporters of United Russia decided to hold their action: about a hundred volunteers of the Young Guard of United Russia and Nashi movements came to Lenin Square to speak out against opposition activists who had gathered at the protest rally. Putin's supporters, however, were extremely unsuccessful in Lenin Square. They did not have permission to hold their own rally, so they could, without breaking the law, only dissolve among the opposition protesters. Instead, the Young Guards and Nashists lined up in front of the opposition group, effectively organizing an alternative rally. As soon as in response to the speeches of the opposition, Putin's supporters began shouting their own slogans, the police intervened. First, militiamen lined up and cut off the rally of civic activists from the president's supporters. Then one of the senior officers of the Ministry of Internal Affairs approached a group of the most active Young Guards and demanded that they show permission to hold an alternative rally. As soon as it became clear that there was no such permission, the militiamen moved on the president's supporters, pushing them back to the road. Then the Interior Ministry officers began to "screw" Putin's supporters, detaining them and putting them on special buses. Part of the activists of MGER and the Nashi movement, throwing slogans and banners, fled from the police. Nevertheless, about 20 supporters were detained, including several members of United Russia. Political analyst Aleksandr Strizoye: “The incident with the dispersal of the pro-Putin rally in Volgograd is undoubtedly a serious political scandal. Moreover, this happened just a few days after Putin took office as president. Undoubtedly, the events of May 12 will breathe optimism into the leaders of the Volgograd opposition".

In May 2012, Bozhenov received 2 out of 5 points in the "Kremlin" rating of heads of constituent entities of Russia, prepared by the "Foundation for the Study of Electoral Processes and Electoral Policy" in conjunction with the newspaper "Nedelya". Among the parameters for calculating the rating: quantitative and qualitative analysis of publications in the media; Governor recognition rating; the rating of the party from which the governor is nominated; assessment of the level of trust in the governor; assessment of the level of confidence in the Government of the Russian Federation and the President of the Russian Federation; riots and demonstrations; strikes; intra-elite disputes; terrorism; the growth of street crime, etc. The publication as follows comments on the fact that Bozhenov became the first head of a constituent entity of Russia, who, instead of the required "five", immediately receives a "two". Primarily, Bozhenov began his activities with a federal scandal (the story of a trip to Italy); secondly, the management team was completely replaced, which now has almost no local representatives; thirdly, Bozhenov did not keep his word about holding elections for the governor of Volgograd Oblast in autumn 2012; fourthly, there are massive protests in the region demanding his resignation; finally, and fifthly, his image is impaired by his connection with the Astrakhan mayoral elections. Immediately after the publication of the rating, Bozhenov was summoned to the Kremlin. According to some experts, such a visit was associated with an unsatisfactory assessment of his activities in his post. At the same time, the regional government's press service reported that Governor Bozhenov was noted in the May rating of the influence of the heads of the constituent entities of Russia, as having significantly strengthened his position, gaining 17 points in comparison with the April figures.

In mid-May, it became known that Bozhenov's wife, Olga had acquired an elite mansion in a prestigious area of Nizhnaya Yalshanka, and a land plot in Volgograd for 5 million rubles, while according to experts, the cost of such real estate could exceed 30 million rubles.

In May 2012, on the public procurement portal, notifications were posted on the Volgograd regional administration holding 26 auctions for "Provision of information coverage of the activities of the Governor of Volgograd Oblast" for a total amount of almost 16 million rubles. The participants were required to have experience in “construction, reconstruction, overhaul of a capital construction facility”. The Ministry of Press and Information of the Volgograd Oblast explained that these requirements for the preparation of tender documentation are unified for all purchases on the territory of the Volgograd Oblast.

On 27 May 2012, a rally was held in Uryupinsk with the participation of more than 2 thousand people in protest against the development of a nickel deposit in the north of the region, which MMC Norilsk Nickel intends to deal with: “We demand the resignation of the governors of the Volgograd and Voronezh Oblasts - Bozhenov and Gordeyev as leaders, who do not care about people and about the land on which we live. In addition, we demand the resignation of the deputy of the regional Duma, Mr. Biryukov, whom we delegated to the regional legislative body to solve problems that, as it turned out today, are absolutely alien to him. We also issued a mandate to Senator Vladimir Plotnikov from the Volgograd Oblast to take all possible measures to prevent the construction of a nickel quarry in the Voronezh Oblast, and if he does nothing, we will also demand his resignation.".

In early June 2012 Bozhenov extended the powers of a member of the Federation Council from the executive branch of the Volgograd Oblast to former Governor Nikolay Maksyuta. Shortly thereafter, Maksyuta's assistant Sergey Trofimov wrote a letter of resignation from his post on his own initiative. Trofimov expressed gratitude to Maksyuta for the experience gained over the years of working with him. But at the same time, he indicated the reasons that prompted him to leave this post, in particular, disagreement with the policy of the regional leadership and unwillingness to take a compromising position with the course of Governor Bozhenov.

From 28 July 2012 to 22 February 2013, he was the Member of the Presidium of the State Council of Russia.

In the September rating of the influence of the heads of the regions of the Agency for Political and Economic Communications, published in Nezavisimaya Gazeta, Bozhenov took 21st place, up by 8 positions.

At the end of 2012, the Volgograd Oblast topped the list of subjects in terms of the amount of unused subsidies to support the agro-industrial complex. The area has not found application for 596.2 million rubles. At the same time, in the summer of 2012, a quarantine for African swine fever was announced in the region. Tens of thousands of pigs kept in private farmsteads were destroyed, this deprived many people of their livelihood, entailed an increase in social tension in rural areas. Meanwhile, there is an opinion that these measures are not aimed at combating the plague, the spread of which on such a scale has not been confirmed by laboratory tests, but are related to the commercial interests of groups close to the governor.

At the very beginning of 2013, the Deputy Prime Minister of the Volgograd Oblast Government, Pavel Krupnov, was detained on suspicion of accepting a bribe in the amount of 17 million rubles.

Bozhenov had violated the requirements of the charter of the Volgograd Oblast and did not submit a report on his work for the past year to the Volgograd Oblast Duma for approval until 30 May 2013.

In August 2013, the General Prosecutor's Office of Russia announced that it had identified violations of the law, which consisted in the fact that 1.4 billion rubles allocated for the construction and maintenance of regional roads from the federal budget were allocated by the regional Ministry of Finance “for purposes not related to the financial provision of road economy and road activities".

In September 2013, it became known that the governor's accommodation at the Neftyanik tourist center in the Sredneakhtubinsky district, one of the best recreation centers in the region, is paid from the regional budget under an agreement on 26 November 2012. The rent is more than 880 thousand rubles per month, for 11 months more than 9 million rubles have been paid. In the same month, some motor transport enterprises of the region, carrying out bus transportation of the population, were forced to stop working due to lack of funding for fuel.

After the elections of the Volgograd City Duma, the opposition announced numerous violations of electoral legislation. The Communist Party of the Russian Federation and some other parties organized a round-the-clock action in the park opposite the regional government and the Duma, which takes place in the form of a meeting of deputies with voters, and therefore does not fall under the restrictions imposed on mass gatherings of citizens. The action, which took place on September 25 on Lenin Square, gathered about 2 thousand people.

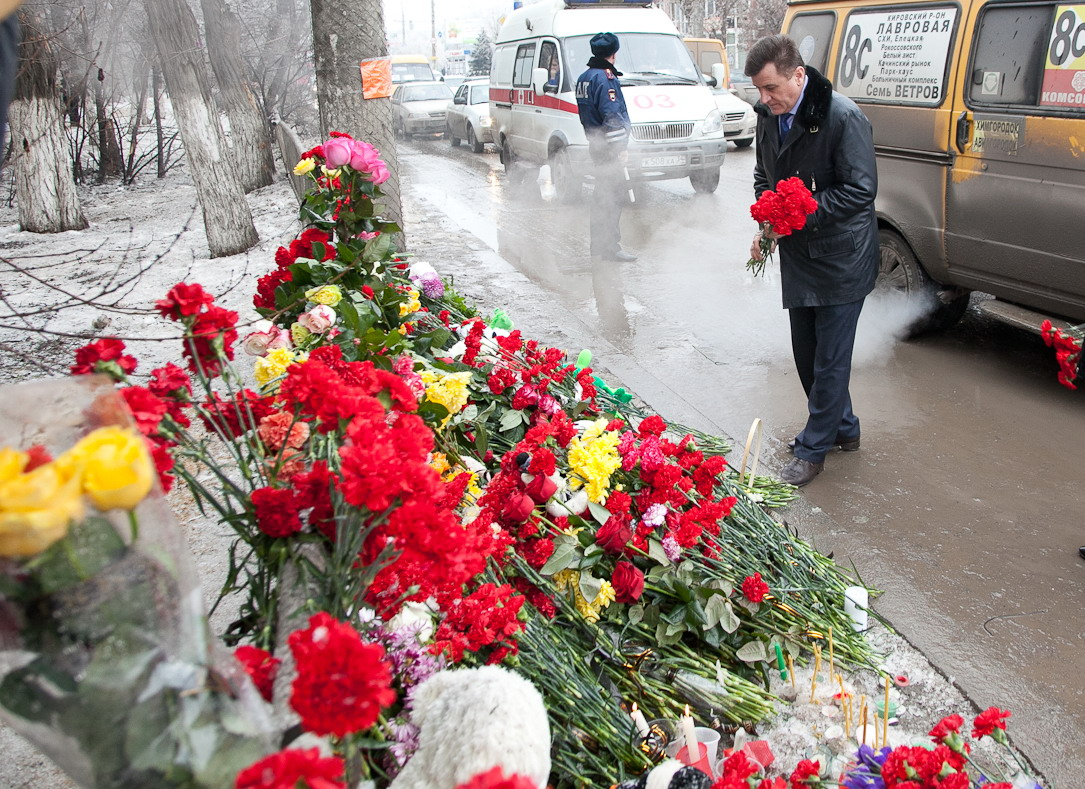
Bozhenov at the site of the trolleybus explosion on 31 December 2013.

In October and December 2013, there were three terrorist attacks in Volgograd (bus, train station and trolleybus). In this regard, Viktor Kazantsev, the former plenipotentiary in the Southern Federal District, said: “Along with condolences to the wounded, relatives and friends of the injured and killed, I am personally overwhelmed with surprise and anger. The explosion in Volgograd should entail resignation. Personnel in security matters decide, if not everything, then a lot. Already after the October explosions in the Volgograd bus, the question arose about the official compliance of the governor of the Oblast, Bozhenov.".

On 2 April 2014, Bozhenov was removed from the post of Governor of the Volgograd Oblast at his own request.

== Family ==
His wife, Olga, was elected in 2006 and 2011 as a member of the State Duma of the Astrakhan Oblast. She was awarded the Medal of the Order of Merit for the Astrakhan Oblast in 2008.
