= Governor of Volgograd Oblast =

Highest-ranking official in Volgograd Oblast, Russia

- Coat of arms of Volgograd Oblast

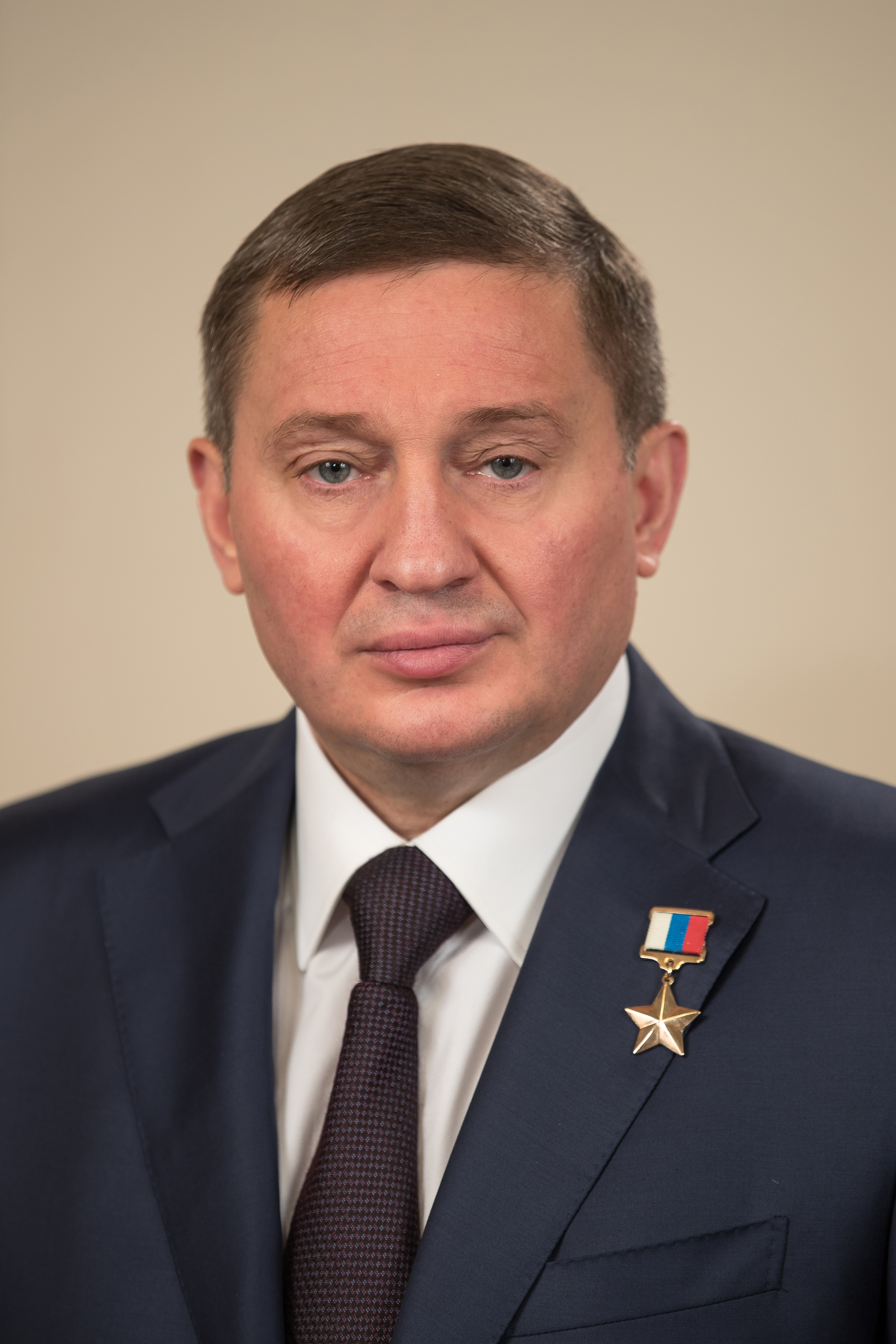
- Incumbent; Andrey Bocharov since 4 April 2014
- Seat: Volgograd
- Term length: 5 years
- Formation: 1991
- First holder: Ivan Shabunin
- Website: www.volgograd.ru

The Governor of Volgograd Oblast (Russian: Губернатор Волгоградской области) is the head of government of Volgograd Oblast, a federal subject of Russia.

The position was introduced in 1991 as Head of Administration of Volgograd Oblast. The Governor is elected by direct popular vote for a term of five years.

== List of officeholders ==
No.	Portrait	Governor	Tenure	Time in office	Party	Election
1		Ivan Shabunin (1935–2006)	19 September 1991 – 6 January 1997 (lost election)	5 years, 109 days	Independent	Appointed
2		Nikolay Maksyuta (1947–2020)	6 January 1997 – 12 January 2010 (retired)	13 years, 6 days	Communist	1996; 2000; 2004
3		Anatoly Brovko (born 1966)	12 January 2010 – 17 January 2012 (resigned)	2 years, 5 days	United Russia	2009
—		Sergey Bozhenov (born 1965)	17 January 2012 – 2 February 2012	2 years, 77 days	United Russia	Acting
4		Sergey Bozhenov (born 1965)	2 February 2012 – 4 April 2014 (resigned)	2 years, 77 days	United Russia	2012
—		Andrey Bocharov (born 1969)	4 April 2014 – 24 September 2014	12 years, 156 days	Independent	Acting
5		Andrey Bocharov (born 1969)	24 September 2014 – present	12 years, 156 days	Independent	2014; 2019; 2024
