= Leonid Ogul =

Russian politician

- Леонид Огуль
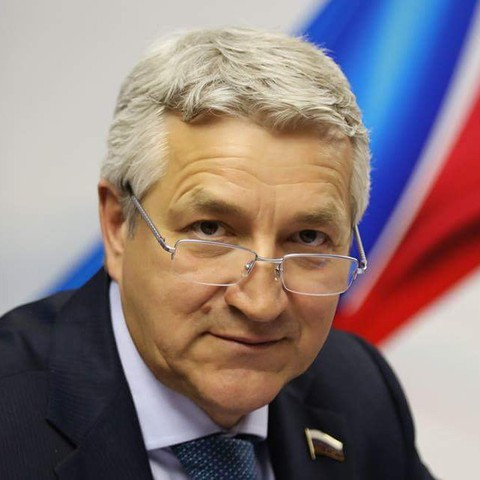

Deputy of the State Duma (party list seat)
- Incumbent
- Assumed office 30 September 2026
- In office 21 December 2011 – 5 October 2016

Deputy of the State Duma for Astrakhan
- In office 5 October 2016 – 30 September 2026
- Preceded by: constituency re-established
- Succeeded by: Rinat Ayupov

Personal details
- Born: 26 October 1963 (age 62) Astrakhan, Astrakhan Oblast, Russian SFSR, USSR
- Party: United Russia
- Education: Astrakhan State Medical University

Leonid Anatolyevich Ogul (Russian: Леонид Анатольевич Огуль; born 26 October 1963, Torbeyevo) is a Russian political figure and a deputy of the 6th, 7th, and 8th State Dumas. In 2008, Ogul was granted a Candidate of Sciences in Medicine degree.

From 1988 to 2004, Ogul worked as the resuscitator-anaesthesiologist of the pediatric resuscitation department. In 2005-2012, he headed the chief physician of the municipal health institution. On 3 December 2000 he was elected deputy of the Astrakhan City Council. From 2001 to 2011, Ogul served as deputy of the Duma of Astrakhan Oblast. In 2011, 2016, 2021, Ogul was elected as a deputy of the 6th, 7th, and 8th State Dumas.

== Sanctions ==
He was sanctioned by the UK government in 2022 in relation to the Russo-Ukrainian War.
