= Sergei Gornyakov =

Russian politician (born 1966)

- Сергей Горняков
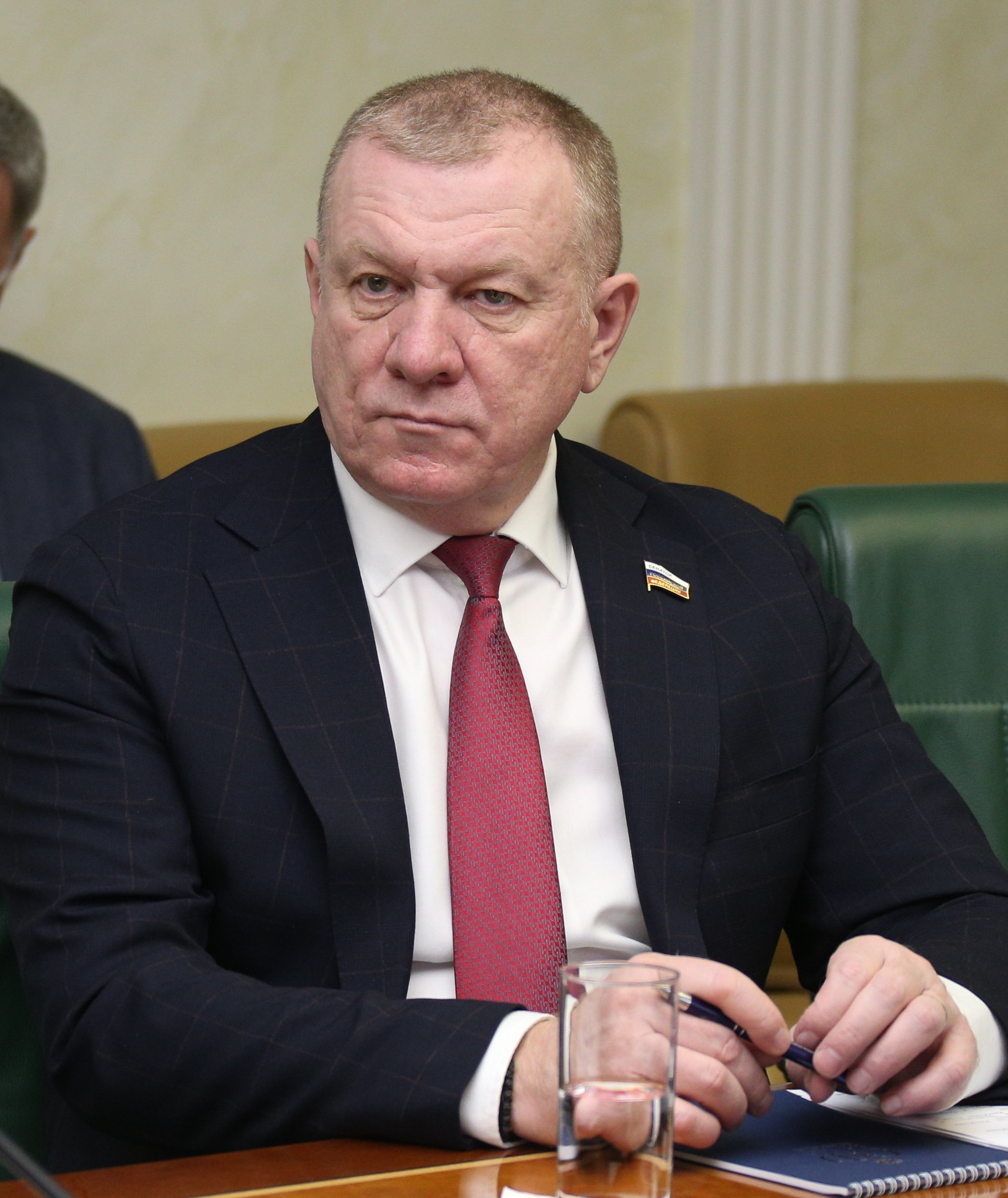

Senator from Volgograd Oblast

Senator
- Incumbent
- Assumed office 9 October 2019
- Preceded by: Tatyana Lebedeva

Personal details
- Born: Sergei Gornyakov; 5 January 1966 (age 60) Volgograd, Volgograd Oblast, Russian Soviet Federative Socialist Republic, Soviet Union
- Party: United Russia
- Education: Volgograd State University

Sergei Vasilyevich Gornyakov (Russian: Сергей Васильевич Горняков; born 5 January 1966) is a Russian politician serving as a senator from Volgograd Oblast since 9 October 2019.

== Biography ==
Sergei Gornyakov was born on 5 January 1966 in Volgograd, Volgograd Oblast. In 2001, she graduated from Volgograd State University. Afterwards, he worked as gas electric welder and as senior inspector of the road patrol service of the Department of Internal Affairs of the Uryupinsk region. Gornyakov was also engaged in private entrepreneurship. From 2005 to 2014, he was the head of Uryupinsk State Duma. On 28 September 2019, he became the senator from the Volgograd Oblast Duma.

Sergei Gornyakov is under personal sanctions introduced by the European Union, the United Kingdom, the USA, Canada, Switzerland, Australia, Ukraine, New Zealand, for ratifying the decisions of the "Treaty of Friendship, Cooperation and Mutual Assistance between the Russian Federation and the Donetsk People's Republic and between the Russian Federation and the Luhansk People's Republic" and providing political and economic support for Russia's annexation of Ukrainian territories.
