= High-Potential Management Personnel Reserve =

The High-Potential Management Personnel Reserve is a program announced by President of Russia Dmitry Medvedev on 23 July 2008 at a meeting of his Plenipotentiary Representatives.

== The Reserve ==
In his discussions with his Plenipotentiaries, Medvedev recalled the nomenklatura system in the Soviet Union, which since the dissolution of the USSR the system has not been replaced, allowing cronyism to dictate appointments to senior positions within the Russian government. Medvedev acknowledged that sometimes position are sold to the highest bidder and regards this as disgraceful, stating "since the Russian government is a democracy, not a medieval tyranny, we must break out of this vicious circle, and work to involve the best, the most highly trained professionals, and motivate them, and we have to do it with the cooperation of the entire civil society."

Miriam Elder, writing for The Daily Telegraph, noted that the Reserve is an attempt by Medvedev to build his own power base, in order to assert his authority on the political stage in Russia.

== First 100 ==
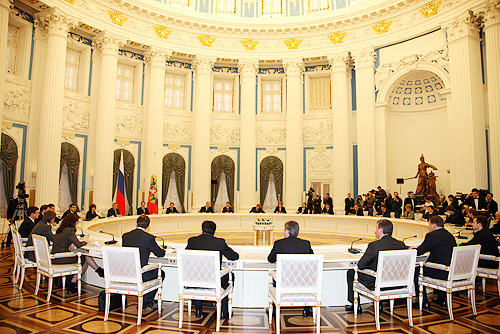
Medvedev meeting with members of the first 100 candidates on 4 March 2009 at the Kremlin.

The list of the first 100 members of the High-Potential Management Personnel Reserve, which has invariably been dubbed the Golden 100 or the Presidential Gold Flock, was released by the President on 17 February 2009, and includes 36 people from Federal Government authorities, 23 people from regional authorities, 31 from business and 10 from science, education and non-governmental organisations backgrounds. The average age of candidates on the list is 39, and the youngest at 27 years of age are Vladimir Nazarov and Nikolay Nikiforov, whilst all are younger than 50 years of age. None of the first 100 members of the Reserve have served in the KGB or the FSB, and all have liberal leanings.

Representatives of Federal Government authorities Representatives of regional authorities Representatives of business Representatives of science, education and non-governmental organisations

Candidate	Year of birth	Place of employment	Position held
Konstantin Vladimirovich Akimov	1971	Continental Management Timber Industrial Company	Chairman of the Board of Directors
Maxim Alekseyevich Akimov	1970	Kaluga Oblast Administration	Vice-Governor
Alexey Olegovich Alexandrov	1960	Government of Moscow	Prefect of Central Administrative Okrug of Moscow
Fyodor Borisovich Andreyev	1966	Russian Railways	Senior Vice-President
Georgy Vladimirovich Antsev	1961	Radar MMS	General-Director — Head Designer
Alexander Borisovich Arutyunov	1971	Intourist	President
Dmitry Igoryevich Azarov	1970	Samara Oblast Government	Minister of Natural Resources and Environmental Protection
Igor Vyacheslavovich Barinov	1968	State Duma	Deputy
Said Beletbekovich Batkibekov	1977	Troika Capital Partners Limited	Vice-President
Vladislav Arturovich Baumgertner	1972	Uralkali	General-Director
Oleg Valentinovich Belozyorov	1969	Federal Highway Agency	Head
Boris Leonidovich Bobrovnikov	1960	CROC Inc.	General-Director
Andrey Removich Bokarev	1966	Kuzbassrazrezugol	Chairman of the Board of Directors
Pavel Andreyevich Borodin	1971	Federal Fund for the Assistance of Housing Development	Deputy General-Director
Anatoly Grigoriyevich Brovko	1966	Vologda Oblast Administration	Deputy Head of the Administration of Investment and Trade
Oleg Mikhailovich Budargin	1960	Plenipotentiary Representative of the Russian President in the Siberian Federal District	Assistant to the Plenipotentiary Representative
Alexander Stanislavovich Bulygin	1968	United Company RUSAL	Chairman of the Board — General-Director
Andrey Viktorovich Burenin	1974	Renova Management AG	Finance Director
Pavel Yuryevich Chinilin	1971	Office of the Russian Federation Government	Department Deputy Director
Alexander Valeriyevich Grigoriyev	1963	Ingosstrakh	Chairman of the Board — General-Director
Oleg Ivanovich Denisenko	1962	State Duma	Deputy
Olga Konstantinovna Dergunova	1965	VTB Bank	Member of the Board of Directors
Andrey Yuriyevich Dubinsky	1960	BDO Unicon	General-Director
Yelena Grigoriyevna Dyakova	1965	Public Chamber of Russia - Institute of Philosophy and Law of the Urals Division of the Russian Academy of Sciences	Chief Research Officer
Oleg Vladislavovich Fomichyov	1977	Ministry of Economic Development and Trade	Department Director
Sergey Anatoliyevich Gaplikov	1970	Cabinet of Ministers of the Chuvash Republic	Chairman of the Cabinet of Ministers
Vyacheslav Mikhailovich Gayzer	1966	Komi Republic Government	Deputy Head of the Republic — Minister of Finance
Vladimir Aleksandrovich Goncharov	1972	Federal Registration Service	Head of the Administration in Rostov Oblast
Tatyana Vladimirovna Gorbachik	1970	Ministry of Transport	Department Director
Sergey Maratovich Guriyev	1971	New Economic School	Rector
Sergey Yevgeniyevich Ilyinykh	1975	Tomsk Oblast Administration	Deputy Governor for Social Policy
Rashid Faatovich Ismagilov	1960	Leningrad Oblast Administration	Vice-Governor
Alexander Vladimirovich Ivlev	1967	Ernst & Young	Partner — Council of Directors of the company in the CIS
Alexander Vadimovich Izosimov	1964	VimpelCom	General-Director
Anna Vladimirovna Izotova	1976	Federal Tariff Service	Head of Department
Igor Yevgeniyevich Karavayev	1968	Ministry of Industry and Trade	Department Director
Lev Aronovich Khasis	1966	X5 Retail Group	Chief Executive Officer — Chairman of the Board
Alexander Vladimirovich Kibovsky	1973	Federal Supervision Service for Compliance with the Law in Mass Communications and Cultural Heritage Protection	Head
Konstantin Iosifovich Kosachyov	1962	State Duma	Committee Chairman
Boris Yuriyevich Kovalchuk	1977	Office of the Russian Federation Government	Department Director
Andrey Anatoliyevich Kozitsin	1960	Ural Mining and Metallurgical Company	General-Director
Dmitry Vladimirovich Kulagin	1968	Legislative Assembly of Orenburg Oblast	Chairman
Vadim Petrovich Kulichenko	1973	Samara Oblast Government	Vice-Chairman — Minister of Health and Social Development
Mikhail Yuriyevich Kurbatov	1981	Ministry of Economic Development and Trade	Department Director
Oleg Aleksandrovich Kuvshinnikov	1965	Mayor of Cherepovets	Mayor
Yevgeny Vladimirovich Kuyvashev	1971	Mayor of Tyumen	Mayor
Dmitry Viktorovich Livanov	1967	Moscow Institute of Steel and Alloys	Rector
Yevgeny Vasiliyevich Miskevich	1978	Tyumen Oblast Government	Head of the Main Department for Construction
Denis Valentinovich Manturov	1969	Ministry of Industry and Trade	Deputy Minister
Dmitry Gennadiyevich Matishov	1966	Southern Scientific Centre of the Russian Academy of Sciences - Southern Federal University	Vice-Chairman — Head of Oceanology Department
Yelena Yuriyevna Matveyeva	1966	Kaliningrad Oblast Government	Minister of Finance
Dmitry Yuriyevich Mednikov	1980	Head Office of "Russian Information Superhighway"	Editor-in-Chief
Leonid Adolfovich Melamed	1967	AFK Sistema	President
Vladislav Vladimirovich Menshchikov	1959	Almaz-Antey	General-Director
Terenty Vladimirovich Meshcheryakov	1974	Legislative Assembly of Saint Petersburg	Deputy
Ilsur Raysovich Metshin	1969	Kazan City Administration	Mayor
Garry Vladimirovich Minkh	1959	Office of the Russian Federation Government	Legal Department Director
Svetlana Vasiliyevna Mironyuk	1968	RIA Novosti	Editor-in-Chief
Mikhail Vladimirovich Mishustin	1966	UFG Asset Management	President
Alexey Anatoliyevich Moskalenko	1981	LLK International	Deputy Department Head for Legal Groundwork
Stanislav Aleksandrovich Naumov	1972	Ministry of Industry and Trade	State Secretary — Deputy Minister
Vladimir Stanislavovich Nazarov	1982	Institute for the Economy in Transition	Laboratory Chief of Federal Spending
Oleg Viktorovich Neterebsky	1960	Moscow City Government	Head of the Department of Work and Employment
Nikolay Anatoliyevich Nikiforov	1982	Centre of Information Technology of the Republic of Tatarstan	General-Director
Konstantin Yuriyevich Noskov	1978	Office of the Russian Federation Government	Department Deputy Director
Alexander Valentinovich Novak	1971	Ministry of Finance	Deputy Minister
Ilana Vitaliyevna Pepelyayeva	1965	State Duma	Deputy Chairman of the Financial Markets Committee
Alexander Naumovich Pertsovsky	1968	Renaissance Capital	Chairman of the Board
Olga Alexandrovna Pleshakova	1966	Transaero	General-Director
Tatyana Yuriyevna Popova	1972	State Corporation "Assistance Fund for Housing and Public Utilities"	Deputy General-Director — Chief of Staff
Anastasiya Vladimirovna Rakova	1976	Ministry of Regional Development	Deputy Minister — State Secretary
Vladimir Valeriyevich Rashevsky	1973	Siberian Coal Energy Company	General-Director — Chairman of the Board
Yevgeny Vladimirovich Redin	1969	Legislative Assembly of Chelyabinsk Oblast	First Deputy Chairman
Maxim Gennadiyevich Reshetnikov	1979	Ministry of Regional Development	Department Director
Oleg Fedorovich Shakhov	1969	Strategy Centre	Vice-President
Alexey Lvovich Savatyugin	1970	Ministry of Finance	Department Director
Oleg Genrikhovich Savelyev	1965	Ministry of Economic Development and Trade	Deputy Minister
Maksut Igoryevich Shadayev	1979	Presidential Administration	Assistant Director
Andrey Vladimirovich Sharov	1971	Ministry of Economic Development and Trade	Department Director
Andrey Aleksandrovich Slepnyov	1969	Ministry of Agriculture	Deputy Minister
Maxim Yuriyevich Sokolov	1968	Saint Petersburg Government	Chairman of the Committee for Investment and Strategic Projects
Dmitry Valeriyevich Svatkovsky	1971	Nizhniy Novgorod Oblast Government	Minister of Investment Policy
Valery Aleksandrovich Sukhikh	1965	Perm Krai Government	Chairman of the Government
Vladimir Aleksandrovich Tokarev	1977	Federal Railway Transport Agency	Deputy Director
Maxim Aleksandrovich Travnikov	1974	Ministry of Regional Development	Deputy Minister
Ilya Vyacheslavovich Trunin	1976	Ministry of Finance	Department Director
Andrey Anatoliyevich Turchak	1975	Federation Council	Deputy Chairman of the Federal Council Committee on Youth Affairs and Tourism
Yury Matevich Urlichich	1962	Russian Institute of Space Device Engineering	General-Director — General Designer
Sergey Fyodorovich Velmyaykin	1978	Ministry of Health and Social Development	Department Director
Vladimir Konstantinovich Verbitsky	1959	Russian Institute of Directors	First Deputy Director
Andrey Yevgeniyevich Volkov	1960	Moscow School of Management Skolkovo	Rector
Arkady Yuriyevich Volozh	1964	Yandex	General-Director
Stanislav Sergeyevich Voskresensky	1976	Ministry of Economic Development and Trade	Deputy Minister
Alexey Vitaliyevich Vovchenko	1975	Federal Service for Employment and Labor Relations	Deputy Head
Andrey Veniaminovich Yarin	1970	Kabardino-Balkar Republic Government	Chairman of the Government
Kseniya Valentinovna Yudayeva	1970	Sberbank	Chief Economist
Yevgeny Leonidovich Yurev	1971	ATON Investment Group	President
Mikhail Mikhailovich Zadornov	1963	VTB24	President — Chairman of the Board
Andrey Viktorovich Zhukov	1971	Ministry of Transport	Chief of the North-Western Interregional State Administration of Highway Inspection
Igor Valeriyevich Zubkov	1970	Plenipotentiary Representative of the Russian President in the Central Federal District	Assistant to the Plenipotentiary Representative
