= Andrey Bocharov =

Russian politician (born 1969)

- Андрей Бочаров
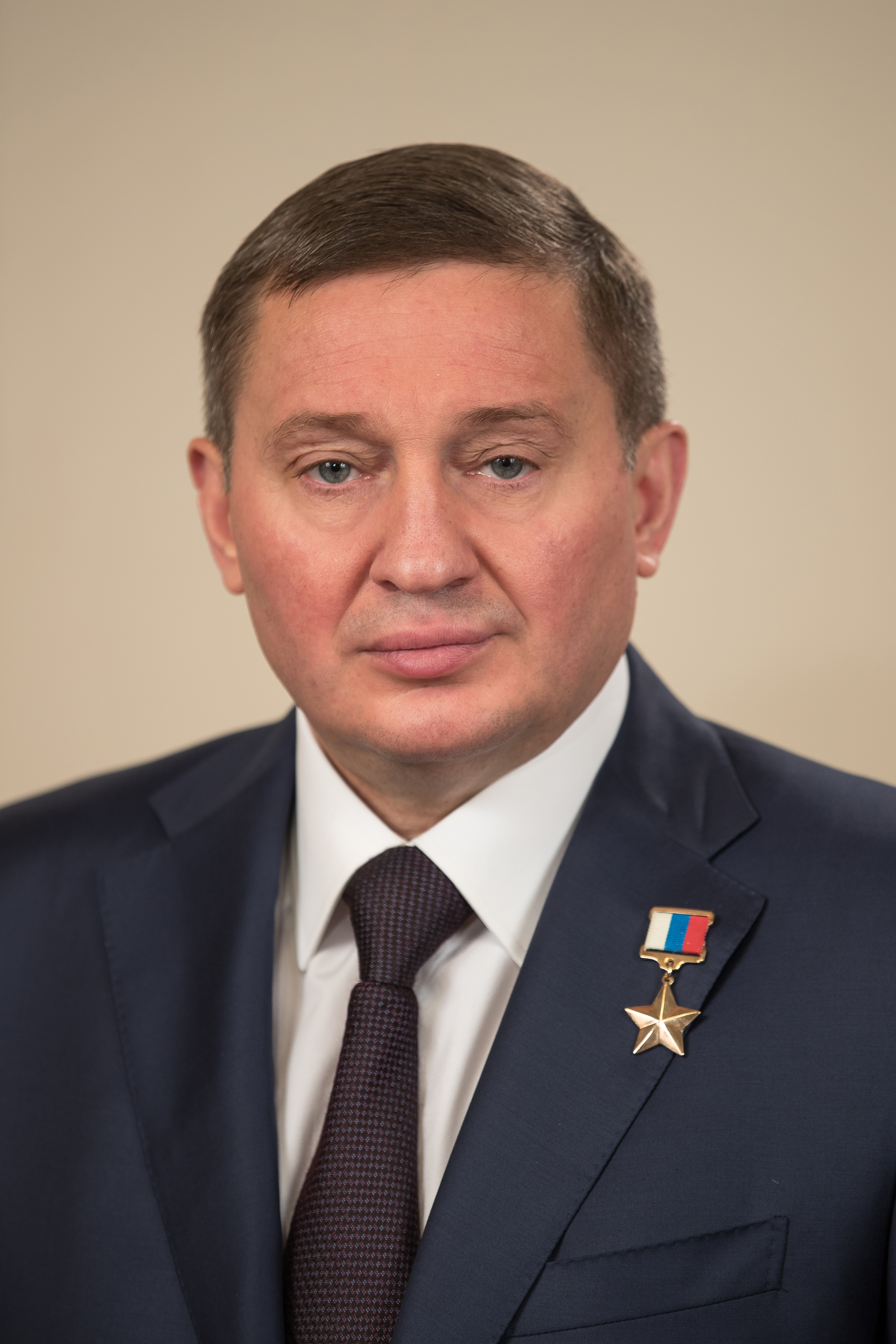
- Official portrait, 2017

5th Governor of Volgograd Oblast
- Incumbent
- Assumed office 24 September 2014
- President: Vladimir Putin
- Preceded by: Sergey Bozhenov

Governor of Volgograd Oblast (acting)
- In office 4 April 2014 – 24 September 2014
- President: Vladimir Putin
- Prime Minister: Dimitry Medvedev

Member of the State Duma
- In office 24 December 2007 – 16 October 2012

Deputy Governor of the Bryansk Oblast
- In office January 2005 – 24 December 2007

Personal details
- Born: Andrey Ivanovich Bocharov; 14 October 1969 (age 56) Barnaul, Russia SSR, Soviet Union
- Party: United Russia (since 2021); Independent
- Awards: Hero of the Russian Federation

Military service
- Battles/wars: First Chechen War

Andrey Ivanovich Bocharov (Russian: Андрей Иванович Бочаров; born 14 October 1969) is a Russian politician and former military officer who currently serves as the Governor of Volgograd Oblast since 2014.

He served as a deputy in the State Duma of the Russian Federation for the fifth and sixth convocations from 2007 to 2012 and as Deputy Governor of the Bryansk Oblast from 2005 to 2007. He was awarded the title of the Hero of the Russian Federation in 1996.

== Career ==
Andrey Bocharov was born in Barnaul on 14 October 1969. As a child, he moved to the Starodubsky District of the Bryansk Oblast with his family. In 1987, he graduated from the Moscow Suvorov Military School and enrolled in the Ryazan Higher Airborne Command School.

=== Military ===
In 1991 Bocharov graduated from the Ryazan Higher Airborne Command School. He then took on positions such as a platoon commander, commander of the Parachute Battalion, and served in the airborne troops. He was also a senior officer in the military unit headquarters and served in the 104th Guards Airborne Division at Ulyanovsk.

==== The First Chechen War and the title of Hero of Russia ====
Andrey Bocharov took part in the First Chechen Campaign, leading the reconnaissance in March 1995. During this time, he managed to capture a key militant defense site in the village of Komsomolsk, which was occupied by as many as 40 militants. Bocharov killed 16 militants and captured three prisoners. On 20 July 1996 Bocharov was awarded the title Hero of the Russian Federation for courage and heroism by the Presidential Decree number 1064.

=== Political activity ===
Bocharov has held many political titles. In December 1998 he became the Chairman of the Union of Heroes of the Russian Council. He then became the Deputy Governor of the Bryansk Oblast in January 2005. Between 2007 and 2012 he acted as the Deputy of the State Duma, before becoming the Chief Federal Inspector in the Bryansk Oblast between October 2012 and August 2013. Soon after, he became the head of the executive committee of the federal headquarters of All Russia People's Front. On 2 April 2014 he was appointed as the acting governor of Volgograd Oblast by presidential decree. He assumed office on 24 September 2014 after receiving over 88% of the vote.

=== Governor of Volgograd Oblast ===
In order to become the Governor of Volgograd Oblast, Bocharov defeated Nikolai Parshin, a State Duma deputy from the Communist Party, who was later prosecuted for criminal activity. Andrey Bocharov supported the investigations, stating that the fight against corruption must be carried out regardless of positions and party regalia and hinted, "there are more strong shocks and high-profile revelations ahead."

=== Sanctions ===
He was sanctioned by the UK government in 2022 in relation to the Russo-Ukrainian War.

== Controversy ==
Andrey Bocharov has been openly associated with the criminal case against Volgograd political blogger Andrey Devyatkin, who has been placed in a psychiatric hospital. However, Bocharov did not appear in the official case.

Bocharov has also tried to obtain federal funds for the revival of the chemical plant Khimprom. Khimprom was previously used to manufacture nerve agents and various dual-use chemicals.

== Additional information ==
In November 2016, Bocharov was the victim of an attempted arson. The suspect has not yet been named, but investigators claim that the attempt was connected to Bocharov's political involvement.

== See also ==
- List of Heroes of the Russian Federation
