= Nikolai Semisotov =

Russian politician (born 1968)

- Николай Семисотов
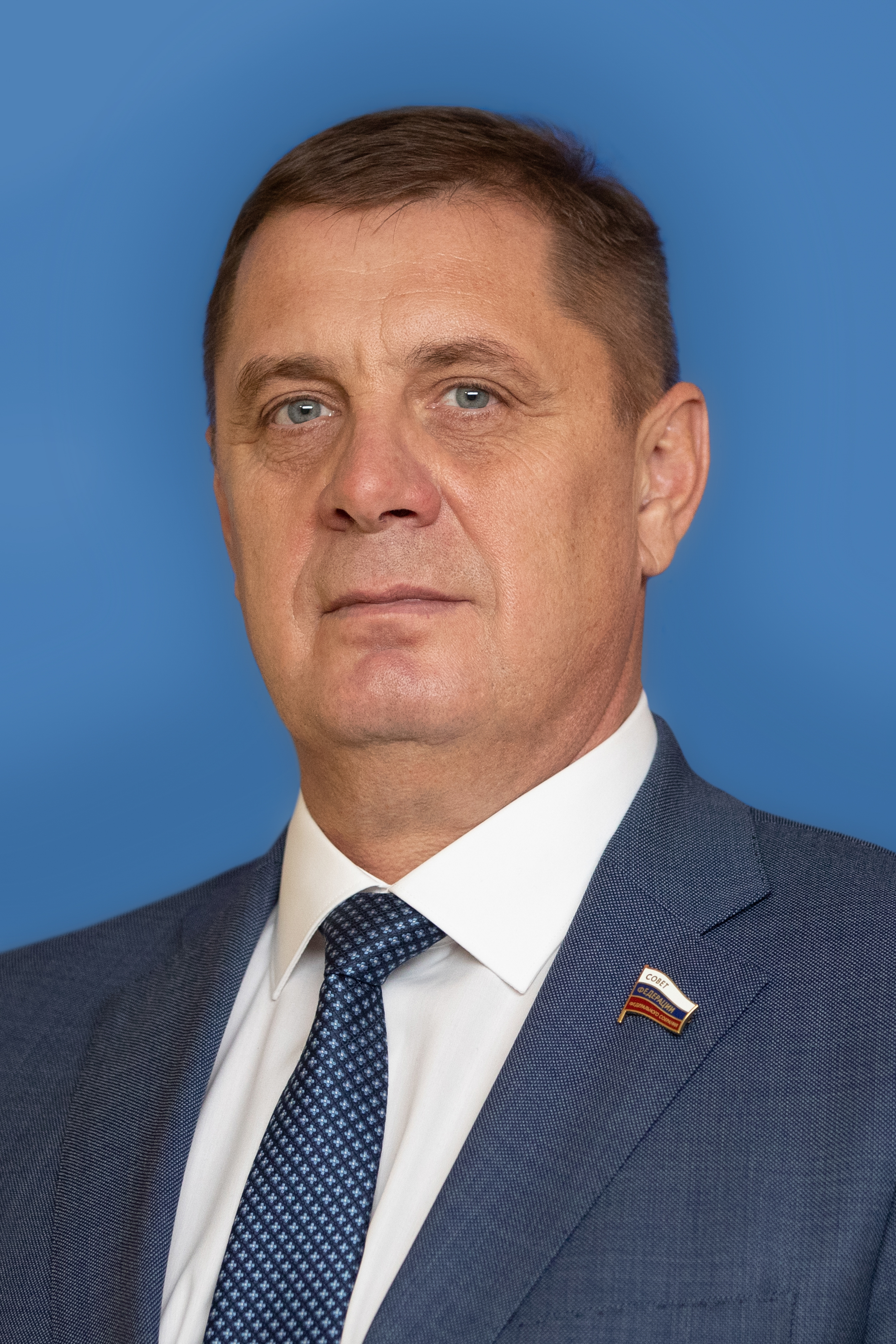

Senator from Volgograd Oblast
- Incumbent
- Assumed office 25 September 2019
- Preceded by: Vladimir Efimov

Personal details
- Born: Nikolai Semisotov; 2 December 1968 (age 56) Sekachi, Mikhaylovsky District, Volgograd Oblast, Russian Soviet Federative Socialist Republic, Soviet Union
- Political party: United Russia

Nikolai Petrovich Semisotov (Russian: Николай Петрович Семисотов; born 2 December 1968) is a Russian politician serving as a senator from Volgograd Oblast since 25 September 2019.

== Career ==
Nikolai Semisotov was born on 2 December 1968 in Sekachi, Mikhaylovsky District, Volgograd Oblast. In 1992, he graduated from the Volgograd State Agrarian University. On 9 October 2005, Semisotov was elected the head of the Mikhaylovsky District, Volgograd Oblast. On 23 September 2012, he became the head of the urban district of the city of Mikhailovka. On 17 September 2014, Semisotov was elected deputy for Volgograd Oblast Duma. On 25 September 2019, he became the senator from Volgograd Oblast.

== Sanctions ==
Nikolai Semisotov is under personal sanctions introduced by the European Union, the United Kingdom, the United States, Canada, Switzerland, Australia, Ukraine, New Zealand, for ratifying the decisions of the "Treaty of Friendship, Cooperation and Mutual Assistance between the Russian Federation and the Donetsk People's Republic and between the Russian Federation and the Luhansk People's Republic" and providing political and economic support for Russia's annexation of Ukrainian territories.
