= Nikolay Maksyuta =

Russian politician (1947–2020)

- Николай Максюта
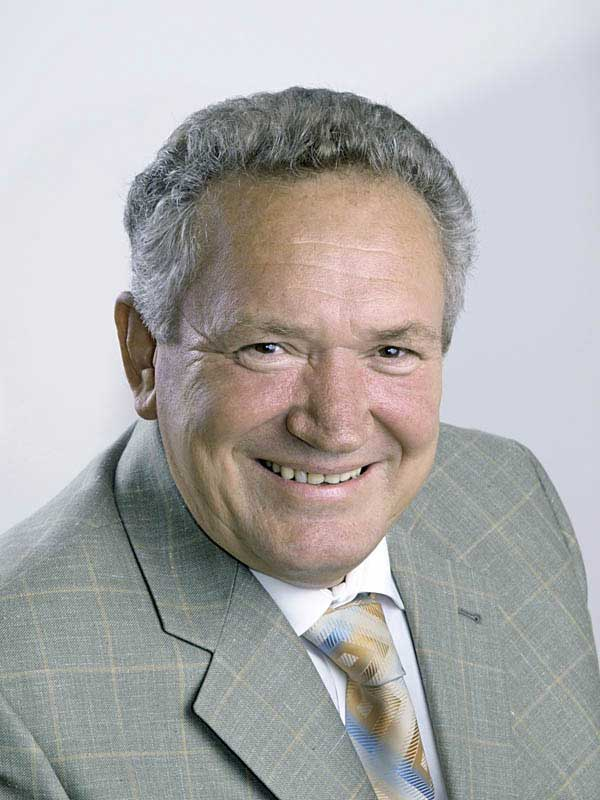
- Maksyuta in 2000

Russian Federation Senator from Volgograd Oblast
- In office 13 January 2010 – 1 January 2015
- Preceded by: Vladimir Babichev
- Succeeded by: Yelena Popova

2nd Governor of Volgograd Oblast
- In office 6 January 1997 – 12 January 2010
- Preceded by: Ivan Shabunin
- Succeeded by: Anatoly Brovko

Personal details
- Born: 26 May 1947; Zakharivka, Novoukrainka Raion, Kirovohrad Oblast, Ukrainian SSR, Soviet Union
- Died: 1 November 2020 (aged 73); Moscow, Russia
- Political party: Communist Party of the Soviet Union (1985-1991); Independent (1991–2000); Communist Party of the Russian Federation (2001–2020)
- Children: 2
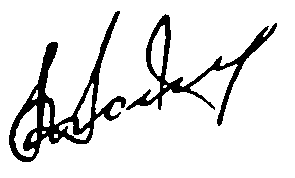
- Signature

Nikolay Kirillovich Maksyuta (Russian: Николай Кириллович Максюта; 26 May 1947 – 1 November 2020) was a Russian politician who was governor of Volgograd Oblast from 1997–2010. In 1996 he won the election for governor. He won his last re-election in 2004, and left office at the end of 2009.

On 1 November 2020, Maksyuta died from COVID-19 in a Moscow hospital. His wife had also died from COVID-19 on 8 October 2020.

== Family ==
Maksyuta was married. He had a son and daughter.
