= Anatoly Brovko =

Russian politician (born 1966)

- Анатолий Бровко
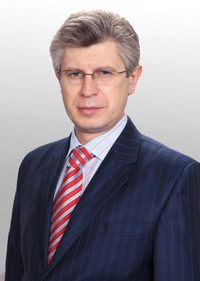

3rd Governor (Head) of Volgograd Oblast
- In office 12 January 2010 – 17 January 2012
- Preceded by: Nikolay Maksyuta
- Succeeded by: Sergey Bozhenov

Personal details
- Born: Anatoly Grigoriyevich Brovko; 22 August 1966 (age 59) Dnipropetrovsk Oblast, Ukrainian SSR, Soviet Union
- Party: United Russia

Anatoly Grigoriyevich Brovko (Russian: Анатолий Григорьевич Бровко; born 22 August 1966) is a Russian politician who served as the governor of Volgograd Oblast in 2010–2012.

Brovko was born in Dnipropetrovsk Oblast, Ukrainian SSR. In 1985, he finished Donetsk Polytechnic Institute. In February 2009, Brovko was included in the list of the "First 100" of the High-Potential Management Personnel Reserve, a program announced by Russian president Dmitry Medvedev on 23 July 2008.
