= Sekachi =

Sekachi Секачи
- Khutor
- Location within Volgograd Oblast Location within Russia
- Coordinates: 50°29′N 43°37′E
- Country: Russia
- Region: Volgograd Oblast
- District: Mikhaylovka Urban Okrug
- Time zone: UTC+4:00

Sekachi (Russian: Секачи) is a rural locality (a khutor) in Mikhaylovka Urban Okrug, Volgograd Oblast, Russia. The population was 653 as of 2010. There are 17 streets.

== Geography ==
Sekachi is located 67 km northeast of Mikhaylovka. 2-y Plotnikov is the nearest rural locality.
