= Yevgeny Urlashov =

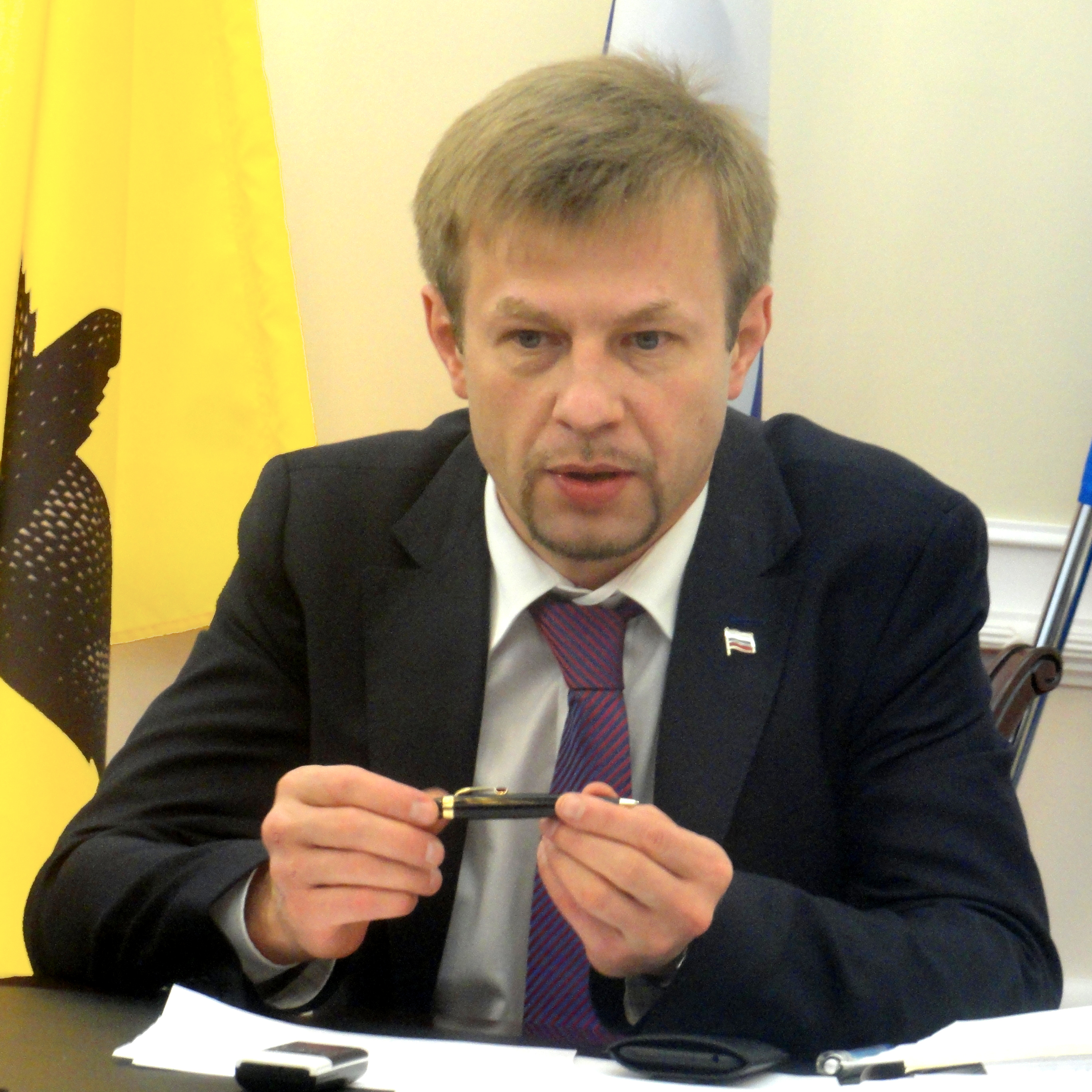

Mayor of Yaroslavl
- In office 11 April 2012 (suspended from office on 18 July 2013) – 20 January 2017
- Preceded by: Viktor Volonchunas
- Succeeded by: Vladimir Sleptsov

Personal details
- Born: Yevgeny Robertovich Urlashov; 16 July 1967 (age 59) Yaroslavl, Russia
- Party: Civic Platform
- Education: Yaroslavl Demidov State University
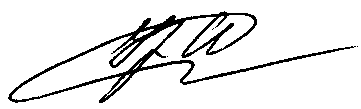
- Signature

Military service
- Branch/service: Soviet Army
- Years of service: 1985-1987
- Unit: Fire-fighting unit

Yevgeny Robertovich Urlashov (Russian: Евгений Робертович Урлашов; born 16 July 1967) was mayor of the city of Yaroslavl, Russia, from April 2012 to July 2013.

He was arrested by Russian authorities in 2013 and sentenced in 2016 for 12,5 years in prison for alleged bribery. In December 2025 he was released.

In 2013, The Washington Post called Urlashov "Russia’s most famous independent and opposition official".

== Biography ==
Urlashov was born on 16 July 1967 in Yaroslavl. From 1985 until 1987 he served in a fire-fighting unit of the Soviet Army.

In 1998 Urlashov graduated from the law faculty of Yaroslavl Demidov State University with a degree in jurisprudence. He began his career at Krasny Mayak factory in 1985. During 2008–2011 he was a member of United Russia political party.

On 1 April 2012 Urlashov was elected Mayor of Yaroslavl, running as an independent candidate. He took office on 11 April 2012.

On 3 July 2013 Urlashov was detained by police on charges of bribery extortion. On 18 July he was suspended from his post pending the conclusion of the court case. He maintains that the corruption case against him was trumped up to end his political career. Investigations and court orders were made to prove this. Urlashov was officially removed from office on 20 January 2017, when his 12 1/2-year sentence came into effect.

In December 2025, he was released. In an interview for El Mundo in March 2026, he announced his intention to remain in Russia and participate in its democratization; according to him, during his imprisonment, he developed a two-volume program for democratic change, the development of Russia, and the restoration of justice.

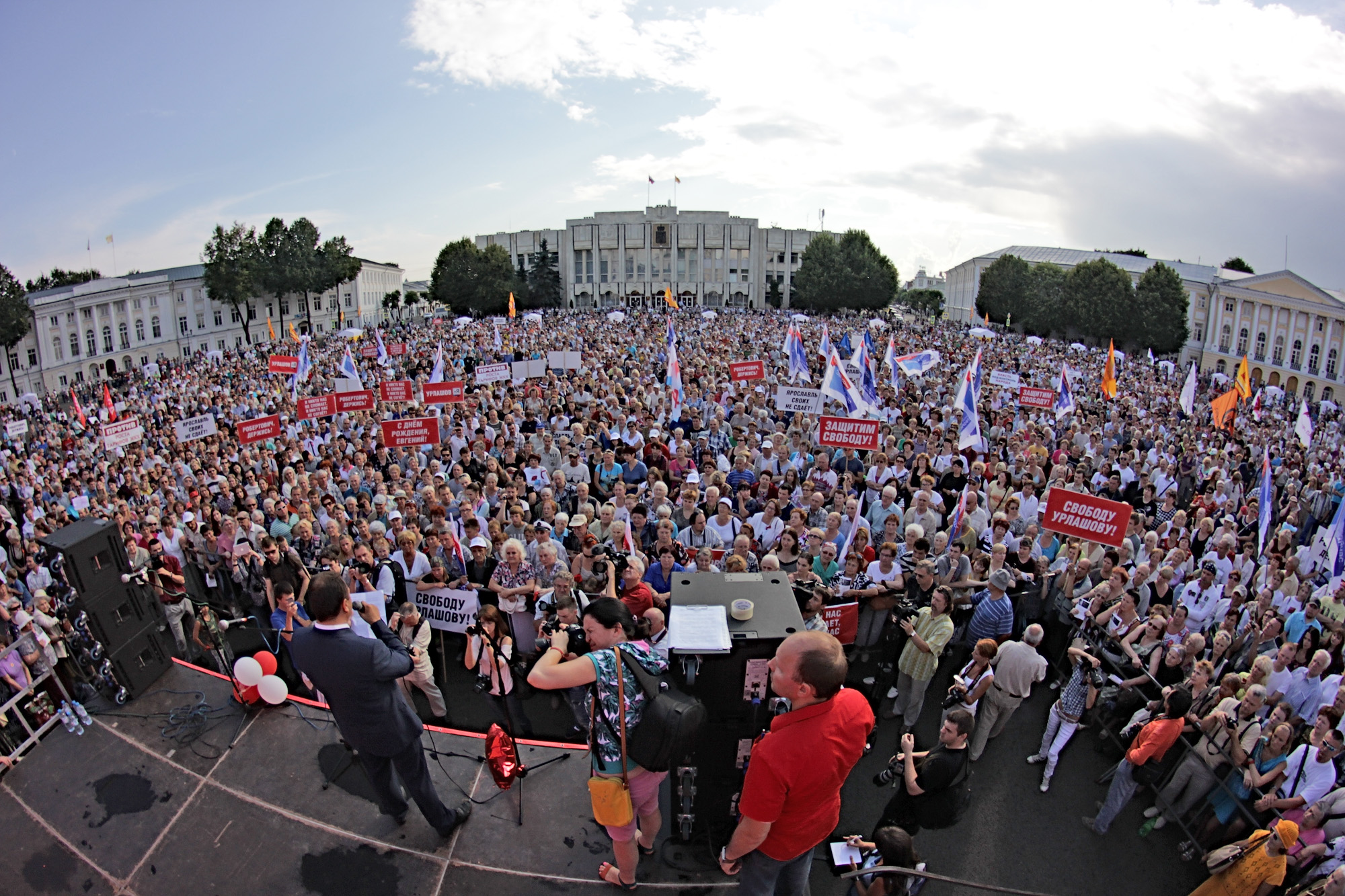
Rally in support of Yaroslavl Mayor Yevgeny Urlashov. Yaroslavl, Sovetskaya Square, July 16, 2013.

== Links ==
- Urlashov's Facebook
- Telegram channel (in Russian)
