= Volzhskoye, Astrakhan Oblast =

Volzhskoye Волжское
- Selo
- Location within Astrakhan Oblast Location within Russia
- Coordinates: 46°38′N 47°51′E
- Country: Russia
- Region: Astrakhan Oblast
- District: Narimanovsky District
- Time zone: UTC+4:00

Volzhskoye (Russian: Волжское) is a rural locality (a selo) and the administrative center of Volzhsky Selsoviet, Narimanovsky District, Astrakhan Oblast, Russia. The population was 3,133 as of 2010. There are 23 streets.

== Geography ==
Volzhskoye is located 5 km south of Narimanov (the district's administrative centre) by road. Narimanov is the nearest rural locality.
