= Khimprom (Volgograd) =

Company based in Volgograd, Russia

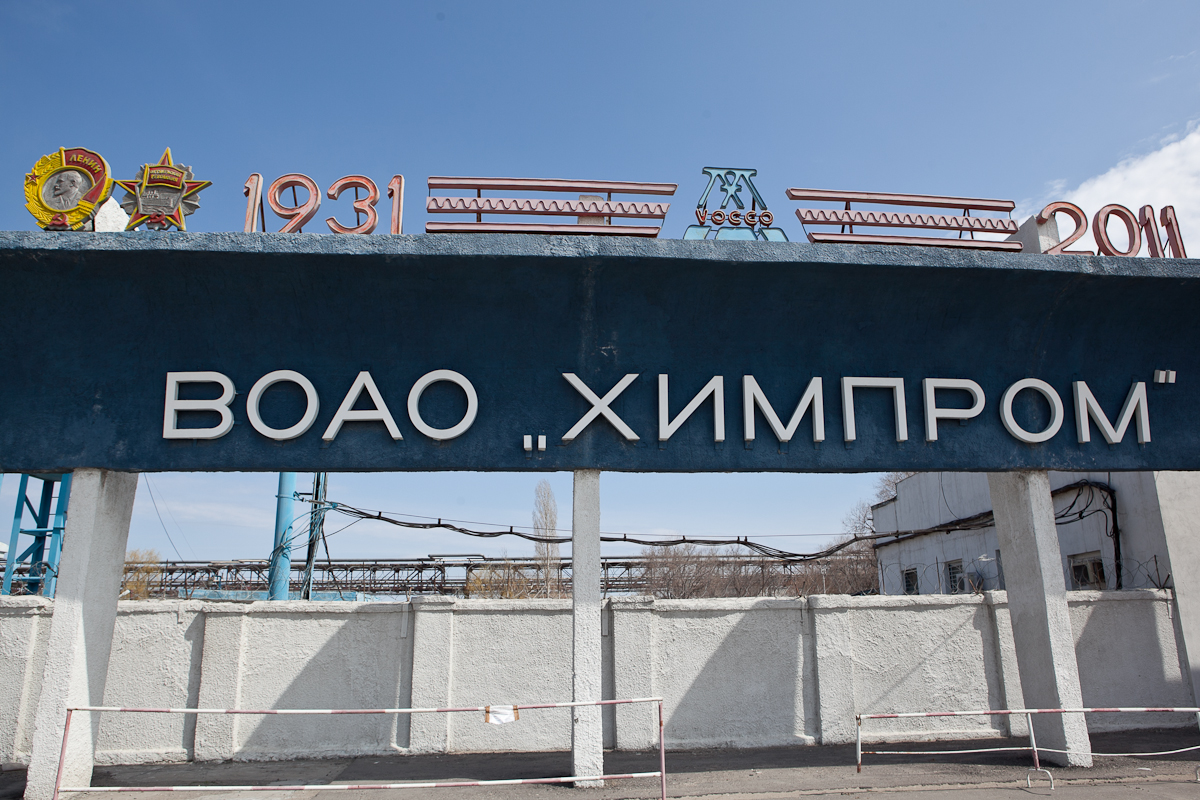
Khimprom in Volgograd, 2014

Khimprom (Russian: Волгоградское открытое акционерное общество «Химпром», formerly known as Plant 91) was a major producer of industrial and consumer chemical products based in Volgograd, Russia. The company used to manufacture organophosphorus nerve agents, and as of 2013 still produced dual-use chemicals.

== History ==
The plant was established in 1931. The plant began production of sarin in 1959, and soman in 1967; production of both was officially ended before 1987. It was claimed that the plant manufactured 5 to 10 tons of binary nerve agent in 1991 as part of the Foliant research program, that was subsequently field tested at the Ust'yurt plateau, Uzbekistan. In the post-Soviet era, the plant manufactured phosphorus oxychloride, and a range of phosphorus- and fluorine-containing compounds.

The company's financial situation grew worse in the late 2000s, and it was officially declared bankrupt in 2012. Production at the plant was fully discontinued in 2014. In January 2015, layoffs began as the enterprise was being liquidated. At the same time, projects were launched to restore the environmental damage caused by the plant during decades of chemical production. As of May 2018, the local government is in talks with the Japan-based Marubeni to build a modern methanol plant on the Khimprom site.

== Present time ==
December 27, 2019 - liquidation of the organization.

Bankruptcy trustee is Chertkova Inna Valeryevna (for 2024).
