= Rinat Ayupov =

Russian politician (born 1974)

- Ринат Аюпов
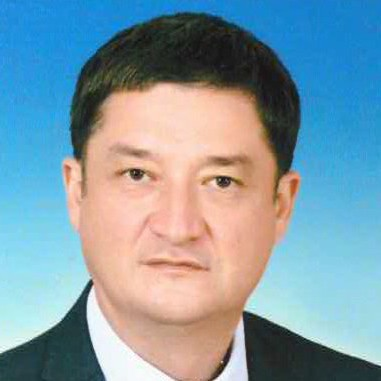

Deputy of the 8th State Duma
- Incumbent
- Assumed office 19 September 2021

Personal details
- Born: 13 August 1974 (age 52) Astrakhan, Russian Soviet Federative Socialist Republic, USSR
- Party: United Russia
- Education: Astrakhan State Technical University Saratov State Academy of Law

Rinat Zaydulayevich Ayupov (Russian: Рина́т Зайдула́евич Аю́пов; born 13 August 1974, Astrakhan) is a Russian political figure, deputy of the 8th State Duma convocation. In 1996 he graduated from the Astrakhan State Technical University. From 2010 to 2011, he was a deputy of the City Duma of Astrakhan. In 2011-2021 he was a deputy of the Duma of Astrakhan Oblast of the 5th, 6th, and 7th convocations. He was also an entrepreneur and for 15 years served as the head of the largest logistics company in Astrakhan.

Since 19 September 2021 he has served as a deputy of the State Duma of 8th convocation. He ran with the United Russia to represent the Republic of Kalmykia and Astrakhan Oblast constituencies.

== Awards ==
- Honorary diploma of the Governor of the Astrakhan Oblast;
- the medal "Benefactor" of the International Charitable Foundation "Patrons of the Century";
- Medal of the Order of Merit for the Astrakhan Oblast;
- A letter of thanks from the President of the Republic of Tatarstan, R.N. Minnikhanov.

== Sanctions ==
Sanctioned by the UK government in 2022 in relation to Russo-Ukrainian War.

On 24 March 2022 the United States Treasury sanctioned him in response to the 2022 Russian invasion of Ukraine.
