= Oleg Shein =

Russian politician

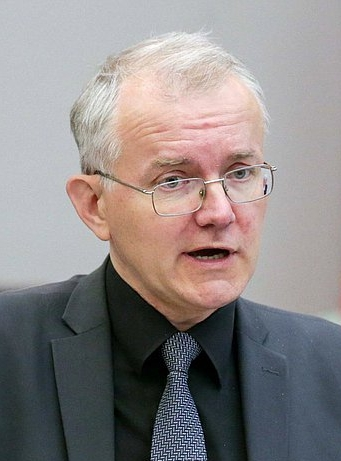
Shein in 2018

Oleg Vasilyevich Shein (Russian: Оле́г Васи́льевич Ше́ин; born March 21, 1972 in Astrakhan, RSFSR, USSR) is a Russian trade union, social and political activist. He was a left-wing deputy of the State Duma's III, IV, V, VI and VII convocations. He joined the Duma's VI convocation only in April 2016, having been a deputy of the Duma of Astrakhan Oblast between 2011 and 2016. He was vice-president of the Confederation of Labour of Russia and co-chair of the Union of citizens. Shein is the author of several books on history.

== Personal life ==
Shein was married to French sociologist Carine Clément between 2002 and 2009. Shein does not smoke or drink alcohol, and has been a vegetarian since childhood.
