= Volgograd Oblast Duma =

Regional parliament of Volgograd Oblast, Russia

Volgograd Oblast Duma Волгоградская областная дума
- 7th legislature

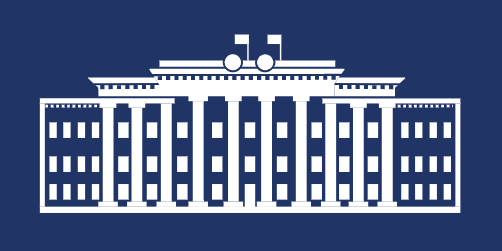

Type
- Type: Unicameral

Leadership
- Chairman: Aleksandr Bloshkin, United Russia since 30 September 2019
- First deputy chairman: Sergey Bulgakov, United Russia since 30 September 2019

Structure
- Seats: 38
- Political groups: United Russia (28) CPRF (5); SRZP (1); LDPR (2); RPPSJ (1) New People (1)
- Length of term: 5 years

Elections
- Voting system: Mixed (Note: 19 deputies elected by single member constituencies, 19 deputies elected in party lists.)
- Last election: 2024
- Next election: 2029

Meeting place
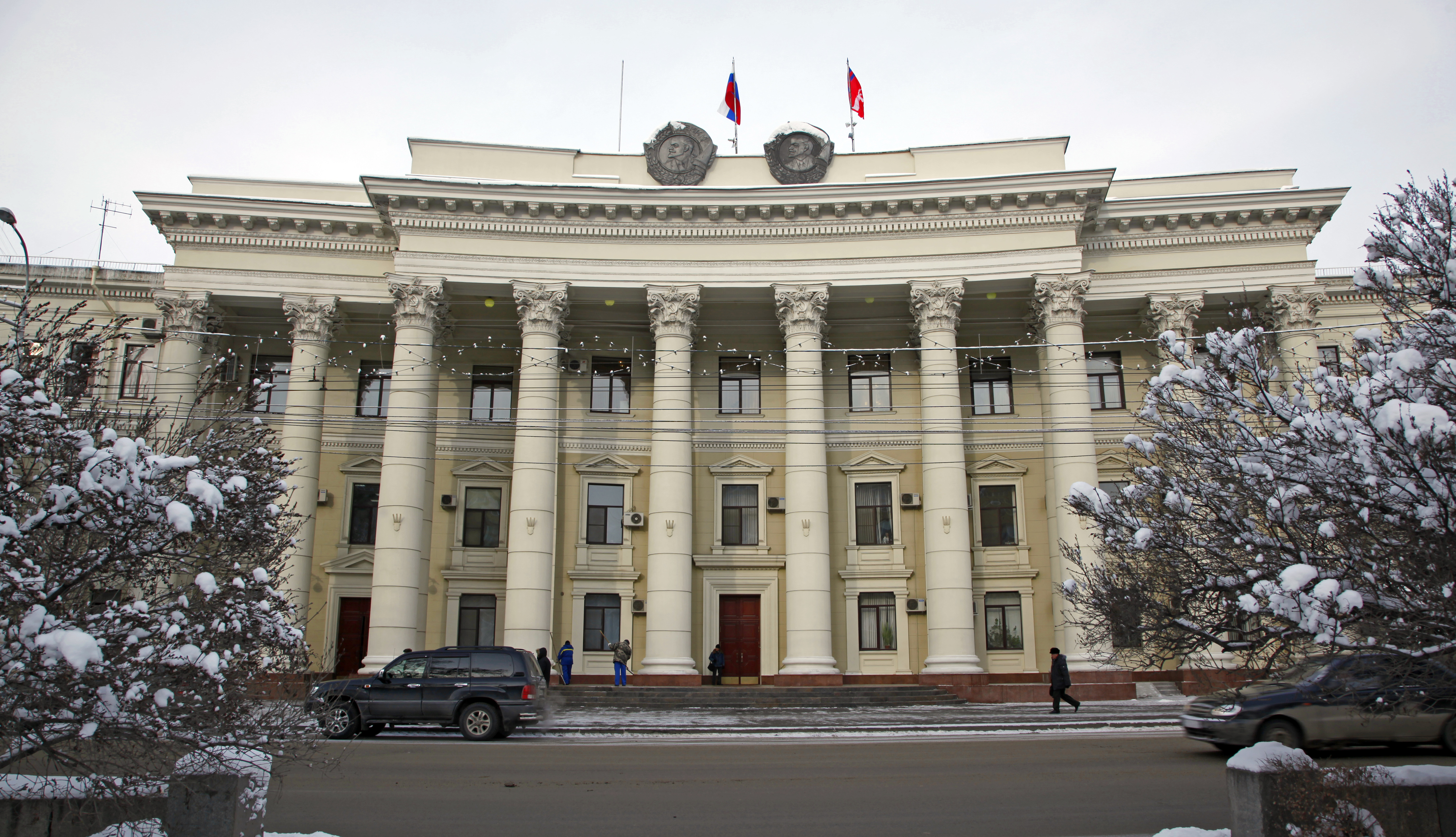
- 9 Lenin Prospekt, Volgograd

Website
- volgoduma.ru

The Volgograd Oblast Duma (Russian: Волгоградская областная дума, romanized: Volgogradskaya oblastnaya duma) is the regional parliament of Volgograd Oblast, a federal subject of Russia. A total of 38 deputies are elected for five-year terms.

== Elections ==
=== 2014 ===
Party	%	Seats
United Russia	60.09	32
Communist Party of the Russian Federation	14.34	3
Liberal Democratic Party of Russia	8.16	1
A Just Russia	5.21	2

=== 2019 ===
Party	%	Seats
United Russia	48.15	28
Communist Party of the Russian Federation	19.50	5
Liberal Democratic Party of Russia	14.85	2
A Just Russia	8.44	2
Russian Party of Pensioners for Social Justice	6.34	1
Registered voters/turnout	41.22	

=== 2024 ===
Party	%	Seats
United Russia	52.44	28
Communist Party of the Russian Federation	16.44	4
Liberal Democratic Party of Russia	12.99	2
SR-ZP	5.50	1
New People	5.17	1
Russian Party of Pensioners for Social Justice	5.12	1
Independent		1
Registered voters/turnout	61.70	
