= Nikolai Vorobyov (politician) =

Russian politician (born 1963)

- Николай Воробьёв
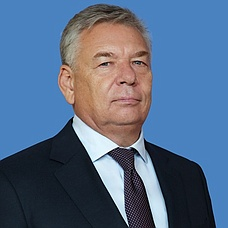

Senator from Tambov Oblast
- Incumbent
- Assumed office 7 October 2024

Chairman of the Tula Oblast Duma
- In office 17 December 2020 – 4 October 2024
- Preceded by: Sergei Kharitonov
- Succeeded by: Abdrei Dubrovsky

Personal details
- Born: 4 June 1963 (age 63) Balashov, RSFSR, Soviet Union
- Party: United Russia
- Education: Gorky Higher Military School of Logistics; Tula State University
- Awards: Order of Friendship; Medal of the Order "For Merit to the Fatherland"

Nikolai Yuryevich Vorobyov (Russian: Николай Юрьевич Воробьёв; born June 4, 1963, in Balashov, Saratov Oblast, RSFSR, USSR) is a Russian statesman and politician. He has served as a Senator of the Russian Federation since October 7, 2024. He is a member of the Federation Council Committee on Rules and Organization of Parliamentary Activity.

Since 2009, he has served as a deputy of the Tula Oblast Duma of the 5th, 6th, and 7th convocations. From 2020 to 2024, he was the Chairman of the Tula Oblast Duma of the 7th convocation and a member of the United Russia faction. He is also the Secretary of the Tula Regional Branch of the United Russia party. He was re-elected for a five-year term in January 2022. He is also a member of the General Council of the United Russia party. He is also the General Director of Gazprom Mezhregiongaz Tula LLC and Gazprom Gas Distribution Tula JSC.

He is a member of the board of trustees of the Tula regional branch of the Association of Lawyers of Russia.

== Biography ==
Nikolay Vorobyov was born on June 4, 1963, in Balashov.

In 1984, at the age of 21, he graduated from the Gorky Higher Military School of Logistics with a degree in engineering and economics.

From 1984 to 1992, he served in the Soviet Armed Forces in various officer positions. He retired from the military in 1992.

Since 1992, he has worked in Balashov, working in commercial organizations. From June 1992 to January 1994, he worked at the Russian-Canadian clothing company M.Goodbay-Lada as a supply engineer and head of the supply and sales department. From January 1994 to October 1996, he worked at the Lada garment factory in Balashov as deputy director of commercial affairs. From November 1996 to March 1997, he was Director of Velmax, a closed joint-stock company in Balashov. From April 1997 to January 1998, he was Director of Tekstiltorg, a company in Balashov. From January 1998 to August 2002, he was the external manager and General Director of Gorpischekombinat Balashovsky, a closed joint-stock company (later a public joint-stock company). In July 1998, by order of D.F. Ayatskov, Governor of the Saratov Region, he was appointed to the interdepartmental commission for the development of the Mineral Waters of the Saratov Oblast program.

In August 2002, he was appointed Director of Tulayurgazservis, a company in Tula. He held this position until October 2002.

From April to June 2003, he was Deputy General Director of Voronezhregiongaz, a company in Voronezh. From June to October 2003, he served as General Director of Investment and Financial Company LLC, Voronezh.

In November 2003, 40-year-old Nikolai Vorobyov was hired by Agora-Oil LLC in Tula as Commercial Director. He worked at the company until December 2006.

From January to October 2007, he served as Director of Regiontekhkomplekt LLC, Tula.

Since November 2007, he has worked at Tula Regional Gas Sales Company LLC (Tularegiongaz LLC, part of the Mezhregiongaz group of companies), a supplier of gas from Gazprom to enterprises and organizations in the Tula Oblast. Nikolai Vorobyov joined the company shortly after the Board of Directors appointed Vasily Drachen as General Director in early November 2007. From November 2007 to September 2008, he served as Advisor to the General Director for Government Relations. From October 2008 to July 2010, he served as Deputy General Director for Administrative Issues and HR, and Deputy General Director for HR and General Issues.

In 2009, he graduated from Tula State University with a degree in heat supply and ventilation.

In the summer of 2009, Vorobyov was nominated by the United Russia party in the elections to the 5th convocation of the Tula Oblast Duma. The elections were held under a proportional system. The only candidate on the United Russia list was Tula Oblast Governor Vyacheslav Dudka. Vorobyov ran in regional group No. 15, "Suvorovskaya", second only to Alexander Ermakov. In the October 11, 2009, elections, the United Russia party list received 55.40% of the vote, resulting in 31 out of 48 seats. Both Yermakov and Vorobyov became deputies. He served in the Duma on a full-time basis, combining this with his work at Tularegiongaz.

In early July 2010, he was appointed General Director of Gazprom Mezhregiongaz Tula LLC (Tularegiongaz LLC), and also concurrently General Director of Gazprom Gas Distribution Tula JSC (Tulaoblgaz OJSC).

In 2011, he graduated from Tula State University with a law degree.

From 2012 to 2013, he was the head of the Tula regional public reception office for United Russia party chairman Dmitry Medvedev.

In the summer of 2014, Vorobyov was again nominated by United Russia in the elections to the 6th Tula Oblast Duma. The elections were held under a mixed system: 19 deputies were elected from party lists in a single constituency and 19 in electoral districts. United Russia's general list included three candidates: Governor of Tula Oblast Vladimir Gruzdev, Nikolai Makarovets, CEO of the Splav Research and Production Association, and Ekaterina Tolstaya, Director of the Leo Tolstoy Museum-Estate "Yasnaya Polyana". Vorobyov ran first in regional group No. 14 and in electoral district No. 14 (Suvorovsky District). In the elections held on September 14, 2014, he was elected as a deputy in district No. 14, receiving the most votes.

In the summer of 2019, Vorobyov was again nominated by United Russia in the elections to the 7th Tula Oblast Duma. The elections were held under a mixed system: 12 deputies were elected from party lists in a single constituency and 24 in electoral districts. Vorobyov ran first in regional group No. 5 and also in electoral district No. 9. In the elections held on September 8, 2019, in constituency No. 9, he received 57.44% of the vote with a turnout of 41.6% and was elected as a deputy.

Since September 2019, he has served as First Deputy Chairman of the Tula Oblast Duma, serving under Sergei Kharitonov.

In August 2020, media reports reported that Vorobyov donated a children's playground to residents of the village of Bogdanovo in the Suvorovsky District.
