= Igor Panchenko =

Russian politician (1963–2023)

- Игорь Панченко
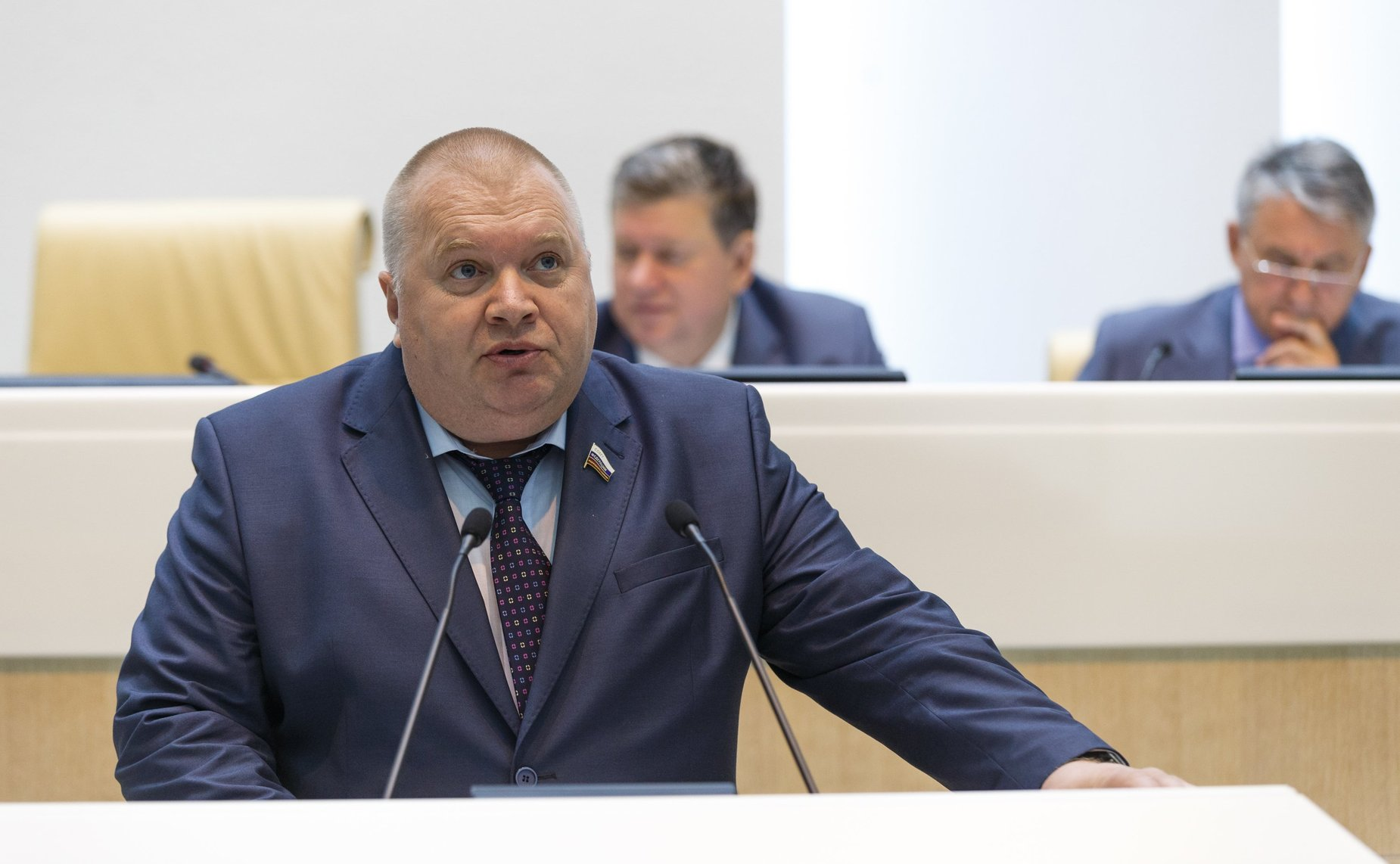
- Panchenko in 2016

Senator from Tula Oblast
- In office 26 September 2019 – 26 July 2023
- Preceded by: Egor Atanov

Personal details
- Born: Igor Panchenko; 18 May 1963 Aleksin, Tula Oblast, Russian SFSR, USSR
- Died: 26 July 2023 (aged 60)
- Party: United Russia
- Education: Tula State University

Igor Vladimirovich Panchenko (Russian: Игорь Владимирович Панченко; 18 May 1963 – 26 July 2023) was a Russian politician who served as a senator from Tula Oblast from 14 October 2021 until his death.

== Biography ==
Igor Panchenko was born on 18 May 1963 in Aleksin, Tula Oblast. In 1985, he graduated from Tula State University. After graduation, he started working at the Aleksinsky Plant of Heavy Industrial Fittings where he stayed for more than 30 years. On 3 October 2004, he was elected deputy of the Tula Oblast Duma of the 4th convocation. In 2009 and 2014, Panchenko was re-elected for the Tula Oblast Duma of the 5th and 6th convocations, consequently. On 30 September 2014, he became the senator from Tula Oblast. In 2019, he was re-elected for the same position.

Panchenko died on 26 July 2023, at the age of 60.

== Sanctions ==
Panchenko was under personal sanctions introduced by the European Union, the United Kingdom, the United States, Canada, Switzerland, Australia, Ukraine, New Zealand, for ratifying the decisions of the "Treaty of Friendship, Cooperation and Mutual Assistance between the Russian Federation and the Donetsk People's Republic and between the Russian Federation and the Luhansk People's Republic", and providing political and economic support for Russia's annexation of Ukrainian territories.
