= 2024 Tula Oblast Duma election =

2024 Russian regional elections

- 6–8 September 2024

All 36 seats in the Oblast Duma 19 seats needed for a majority
- Turnout: 49.47% ▲17.60 pp
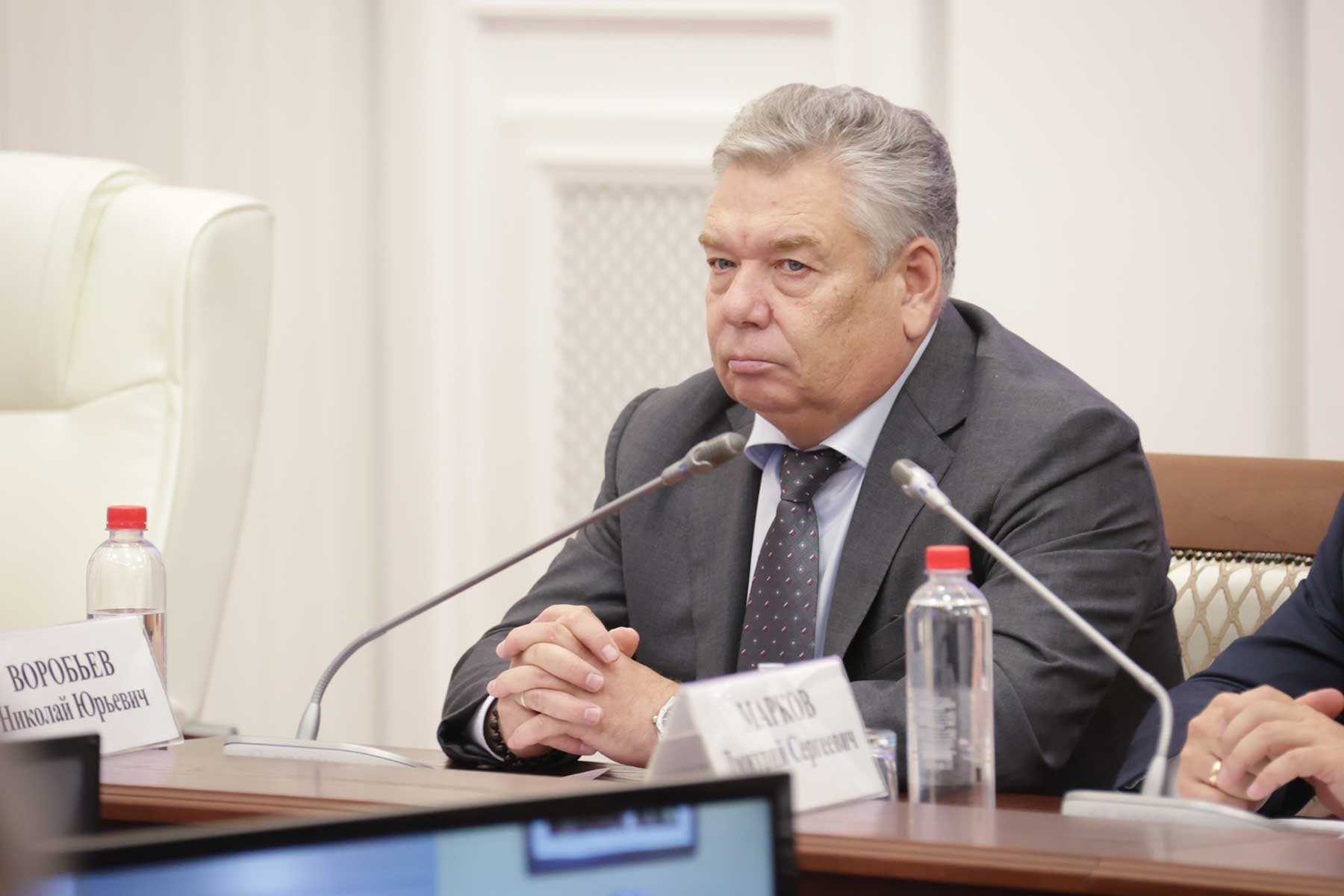

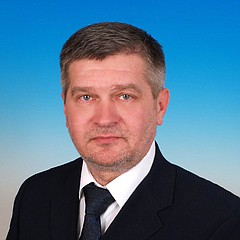
	Majority party	Minority party	Third party
		CPRF
Candidate	Nikolay Vorobyov	Aleksey Lebedev	Aleksandr Balberov
Party	United Russia	CPRF	LDPR
Last election	50.27%, 27 seats	14.49%, 2 seats	10.39%, 2 seats
Seats won	29	2	2
Seat change	▲2	Steady	Steady
Popular vote	330,149	74,256	54,792
Percentage	58.71%	13.20%	9.74%
Swing	▲8.44 pp	▼1.29 pp	▼0.65 pp
	Fourth party	Fifth party	Sixth party
	SR-ZP	RPPSS	NL
Candidate	Sergey Grebenshchikov	Vladimir Rostovtsev	Anna Ivanova
Party	SR-ZP	Party of Pensioners	New People
Last election	7.09%, 2 seats	5.93%, 1 seat	Did not exist
Seats won	2	0	0
Seat change	Steady	▼1	Did not exist
Popular vote	42,580	25,038	23,379
Percentage	7.57%	4.45%	4.16%
Swing	▲0.48 pp	▼1.48 pp	Did not exist
Chairman before election
Nikolay Vorobyov
United Russia
Elected Chairman
Andrey Dubrovsky
United Russia

The 2024 Tula Oblast Duma election took place on 6–8 September 2024, on common election day, coinciding with 2024 Tula Oblast gubernatorial election. All 36 seats in the Oblast Duma were up for reelection.

United Russia retained its overwhelming majority in the Oblast Duma, winning 59% of the vote. Russian Party of Pensioners for Social Justice failed to cross the threshold and lost its sole deputy in the Duma.

== Electoral system ==
Under current election laws, the Oblast Duma is elected for a term of five years, with parallel voting. 12 seats are elected by party-list proportional representation with a 5% electoral threshold, with the other half elected in 24 single-member constituencies by first-past-the-post voting. Seats in the proportional part are allocated using the Imperiali quota, modified to ensure that every party list, which passes the threshold, receives at least one mandate.

== Candidates ==
=== Party lists ===
To register regional lists of candidates, parties need to collect 0.5% of signatures of all registered voters in Tula Oblast.

The following parties were relieved from the necessity to collect signatures:

- United Russia
- Communist Party of the Russian Federation
- A Just Russia — Patriots — For Truth
- Liberal Democratic Party of Russia
- New People
- Russian Party of Pensioners for Social Justice
- Communists of Russia

№	Party	Territorial groups' leaders	Candidates	Territorial groups	Status
1	Liberal Democratic Party	Andrey Chekutov • Mikhail Kuralesov • Larusa Kuznetsova • Sergey Shvyrkov • Aleksey Kovalev • Aleksandr Balberov • Aleksandr Marinkov • Yekaterina Umnova	39	8	Registered
2	United Russia	Aleksandr Rem • Olga Kashirina • Andrey Dubrovsky • Sergey Baltabayev • Nikolay Vorobyov • Sergey Konov • Anatoly Simonov • Irina Shestova • Dmitry Fedotov • Aleksey Erk • Olesya Filina • Galina Alyoshina	72	12	Registered
3	A Just Russia – For Truth	Oleg Gilenko • Vyacheslav Startsev • Yelena Gvozdinskaya • Dmitry Puchin • Sergey Lensky • Zhan Orlov • Sergey Grebenshchikov • Aleksey Komissarov • Vladimir Khomyakov • Anatoly Kuznetsov • Yevgeny Petrov	56	11	Registered
4	Communist Party	Tatyana Kosareva • Aleksey Lebedev • Maksim Fedorov • Svetlana Belous • Lyudmila Gerasimova • Marina Podlyagina • Yevgeny Senashkin • Mikhail Batyaykin • Maksim Dronov	57	10	Registered
5	New People	Yulia Shalamova • Ivan Kutishchev • Grigory Bronshtein • Anna Ivanova • Mikhail Lykov • Aleksandr Chesnokov • Aleksandr Zarovsky	40	7	Registered
6	Party of Pensioners	Anna Baranchikova • Lilya Gorbushina • Zoya Batovkina • Vladimir Rostovtsev • Nikolay Ogoltsov • ~~Valentina Dudukina~~ • Sergey Shelobayev	24	6	Registered
	Yabloko	Vitaly Fomin • Vladimir Dorokhov • Marina Lesnikova • Anton Paramonov • Aleksandr Burdin • Lyubov Izvekova • Pavel Martynov	29	7	Did not file

New People took part in Tula Oblast legislative election for the first time, while Communists of Russia, which entered the parliament in the last election with 5.67% of the vote, chose not to file a party list and nominated only one candidate (incumbent deputy Yury Moiseyev) in the single-mandate constituency.

=== Single-mandate constituencies ===
24 single-mandate constituencies were formed in Tula Oblast. To register candidates in single-mandate constituencies need to collect 3% of signatures of registered voters in the constituency.

Number of candidates in single-mandate constituencies
Party	Candidates	
Party	Nominated	Registered
United Russia	24	24
Communist Party	15	15
Liberal Democratic Party	20	20
A Just Russia – For Truth	24	24
Communists of Russia	1	1
Civic Initiative	1	0
Yabloko	1	0
Total	86	84

== Polls ==
Fieldwork date	Polling firm	UR	CPRF	LDPR	SR-ZP	RPPSS	NL
6–8 September 2024	2024 election	58.7	13.2	9.7	7.6	4.5	4.2
24–29 August 2024	Russian Field	56.6	8.1	12.1	7.2	7.1	6.8
8 September 2019	2019 election	50.3	14.5	10.4	7.1	5.9	–

== Results ==
=== Results by party lists ===
Summary of the 6–8 September 2024 Tula Oblast Duma election results
Party	Party list					Constituency		Total	
Party	Votes	%	±pp	Seats	+/–	Seats	+/–	Seats	+/–
United Russia	330,149	58.71	▲8.44	8	▲2	21	Steady	29	▲2
Communist Party	74,256	13.20	▼1.29	2	Steady	0	Steady	2	Steady
Liberal Democratic Party	54,792	9.74	▼0.65	1	Steady	1	Steady	2	Steady
A Just Russia — For Truth	42,580	7.57	▲0.48	1	Steady	1	Steady	2	Steady
Party of Pensioners	25,038	4.45	▼1.48	0	▼1	–	–	0	▼1
New People	23,379	4.16	New	0	New	–	–	0	New
Communists of Russia	–	–	–	–	–	1	▲1	1	Steady
Invalid ballots	12,182	2.17	▼1.70	—	—	—	—	—	—
Total	562,376	100.00	—	12	Steady	24	Steady	36	Steady
Turnout	562,376	49.47	▲17.60	—	—	—	—	—	—
Registered voters	1,136,885	100.00	—	—	—	—	—	—	—

Businessman and second-term Oblast Duma member Andrey Dubrovsky (United Russia) was elected Chairman of the Oblast Duma, replacing Nikolay Vorobyov (United Russia), who was appointed to the Federation Council by Governor Dmitry Milyayev. Billionaire businessman Mikhail Borshchyov (United Russia) was appointed as Oblast Duma representative to the Federation Council, replacing incumbent Senator Marina Levina (United Russia). Levina, in turn, was elected First Deputy Chairwoman of the Oblast Duma.

=== Results in single-member constituencies ===
==== District 1 ====
Summary of the 6–8 September 2024 Tula Oblast Duma election in District 1
Candidate	Party	Votes	%
Denis Bychkov (incumbent)	United Russia	17,390	68.37%
Oleg Gilenko	A Just Russia — For Truth	4,119	16.19%
Aleksey Suzdaltsev	Communist Party	3,302	12.98%
Total		25,435	100%

==== District 2 ====
Summary of the 6–8 September 2024 Tula Oblast Duma election in District 2
Candidate	Party	Votes	%
Aleksandr Rem (incumbent)	United Russia	17,070	69.21%
Tatyana Kosareva	Communist Party	4,200	17.03%
Maksim Merkul	A Just Russia — For Truth	3,019	12.24%
Total		24,663	100%

==== District 3 ====
Summary of the 6–8 September 2024 Tula Oblast Duma election in District 3
Candidate	Party	Votes	%
Yelena Grebneva	United Russia	13,289	57.67%
Lyudmila Gerasimova	Communist Party	4,059	17.61%
Yelena Kazarina	A Just Russia — For Truth	3,136	13.61%
Aleksandr Strogonov	Liberal Democratic Party	2,157	9.36%
Total		23,043	100%

==== District 4 ====
Summary of the 6–8 September 2024 Tula Oblast Duma election in District 4
Candidate	Party	Votes	%
Marina Belkova (incumbent)	United Russia	18,700	73.77%
Vadim Shcherbakov	A Just Russia — For Truth	3,802	15.00%
Stanislav Feygin	Liberal Democratic Party	2,405	9.49%
Total		25,349	100%

==== District 5 ====
Summary of the 6–8 September 2024 Tula Oblast Duma election in District 5
Candidate	Party	Votes	%
Yekaterina Tolstaya (incumbent)	United Russia	13,664	66.76%
Olga Timoshkevich	Communist Party	2,366	11.56%
Aleksey Seregin	Liberal Democratic Party	2,194	10.72%
Vyacheslav Startsev	A Just Russia — For Truth	1,936	9.46%
Total		20,466	100%

==== District 6 ====
Summary of the 6–8 September 2024 Tula Oblast Duma election in District 6
Candidate	Party	Votes	%
Olga Slyusareva	United Russia	16,401	67.58%
Aleksandr Grechishkin	Communist Party	2,836	11.69%
Mikhail Kuralesov	Liberal Democratic Party	2,732	11.26%
Yevgenia Gvozdinskaya	A Just Russia — For Truth	2,033	8.38%
Total		24,270	100%

==== District 7 ====
Summary of the 6–8 September 2024 Tula Oblast Duma election in District 7
Candidate	Party	Votes	%
Sergey Galkin	United Russia	17,073	71.00%
Yekaterina Sakharova	Liberal Democratic Party	3,940	16.39%
Dmitry Puchin	A Just Russia — For Truth	2,516	10.46%
Total		24,045	100%

==== District 8 ====
Summary of the 6–8 September 2024 Tula Oblast Duma election in District 8
Candidate	Party	Votes	%
Sergey Baltabayev	United Russia	17,718	78.83%
Olga Belyakova	Communist Party	1,809	8.05%
Vitaly Artamonov	Liberal Democratic Party	1,658	7.38%
Kirill Tarasenko	A Just Russia — For Truth	805	3.58%
Total		22,475	100%

==== District 9 ====
Summary of the 6–8 September 2024 Tula Oblast Duma election in District 9
Candidate	Party	Votes	%
Nikolay Vorobyov (incumbent)	United Russia	22,818	83.28%
Oksana Nikonorova	Liberal Democratic Party	2,069	7.55%
Aleksandr Ignatov	A Just Russia — For Truth	1,751	6.39%
Total		27,399	100%

==== District 10 ====
Summary of the 6–8 September 2024 Tula Oblast Duma election in District 10
Candidate	Party	Votes	%
Dmitry Afonichev (incumbent)	United Russia	17,751	67.77%
Dmitry Shishkin	A Just Russia — For Truth	2,729	10.42%
Ivan Mikhaylov	Liberal Democratic Party	2,666	10.18%
Oleg Gololobov	Communist Party	2,385	9.11%
Total		26,193	100%

==== District 11 ====
Summary of the 6–8 September 2024 Tula Oblast Duma election in District 11
Candidate	Party	Votes	%
Gennady Nikitin	United Russia	16,327	62.24%
Sergey Lensky	A Just Russia — For Truth	4,808	18.33%
Ilya Korzhov	Liberal Democratic Party	3,531	13.46%
Total		26,232	100%

==== District 12 ====
Summary of the 6–8 September 2024 Tula Oblast Duma election in District 12
Candidate	Party	Votes	%
Andrey Tikhonov	United Russia	10,974	56.20%
Andrey Shagotsky	Liberal Democratic Party	3,797	19.45%
Valery Pakhomov	A Just Russia — For Truth	3,471	17.78%
Total		19,526	100%

==== District 13 ====
Summary of the 6–8 September 2024 Tula Oblast Duma election in District 13
Candidate	Party	Votes	%
Pavel Mishunin (incumbent)	United Russia	12,808	66.31%
Sergey Shvyrkov	Liberal Democratic Party	3,578	18.52%
Zhan Orlov	A Just Russia — For Truth	2,711	14.04%
Total		19,315	100%

==== District 14 ====
Summary of the 6–8 September 2024 Tula Oblast Duma election in District 14
Candidate	Party	Votes	%
Yury Moiseyev	Communists of Russia	10,781	47.30%
Valeria Smirnova	United Russia	6,953	30.51%
Anton Grishin	A Just Russia — For Truth	2,854	12.52%
Artyom Seliverstov	Liberal Democratic Party	1,714	7.52%
Total		22,791	100%

==== District 15 ====
Summary of the 6–8 September 2024 Tula Oblast Duma election in District 15
Candidate	Party	Votes	%
Mikhail Ivantsov (incumbent)	United Russia	14,764	60.04%
Dmitry Androsov	A Just Russia — For Truth	4,231	17.21%
Anastasia Soboleva	Communist Party	2,773	11.28%
Yegor Petrov	Liberal Democratic Party	1,841	7.49%
Total		24,590	100%

==== District 16 ====
Summary of the 6–8 September 2024 Tula Oblast Duma election in District 16
Candidate	Party	Votes	%
Sergey Grebenshchikov (incumbent)	A Just Russia — For Truth	8,129	48.09%
Pavel Motorny	United Russia	4,530	26.80%
Yekaterina Groznova	Communist Party	1,825	10.80%
Aleksey Kovalev	Liberal Democratic Party	1,391	8.23%
Total		16,902	100%

==== District 17 ====
Summary of the 6–8 September 2024 Tula Oblast Duma election in District 17
Candidate	Party	Votes	%
Ilya Kurilov (incumbent)	United Russia	13,625	59.37%
Maksim Dronov	Communist Party	4,340	18.91%
Aleksey Komissarov	A Just Russia — For Truth	3,720	16.21%
Total		22,951	100%

==== District 18 ====
Summary of the 6–8 September 2024 Tula Oblast Duma election in District 18
Candidate	Party	Votes	%
Dmitry Kharitonov	United Russia	13,417	63.60%
Mikhail Batyaykin	Communist Party	3,251	15.41%
Andrey Drabik	A Just Russia — For Truth	3,152	14.94%
Total		21,095	100%

==== District 19 ====
Summary of the 6–8 September 2024 Tula Oblast Duma election in District 19
Candidate	Party	Votes	%
Aleksandr Balberov (incumbent)	Liberal Democratic Party	10,685	47.08%
Oleg Abashin	United Russia	5,686	25.06%
Valentina Shchukina	Communist Party	2,943	12.97%
Vladimir Khomyakov	A Just Russia — For Truth	2,540	11.19%
Total		22,694	100%

==== District 20 ====
Summary of the 6–8 September 2024 Tula Oblast Duma election in District 20
Candidate	Party	Votes	%
Marina Levina	United Russia	18,281	71.67%
Maksim Karius	A Just Russia — For Truth	3,738	14.65%
Ilya Kindeyev	Liberal Democratic Party	2,909	11.40%
Total		25,508	100%

==== District 21 ====
Summary of the 6–8 September 2024 Tula Oblast Duma election in District 21
Candidate	Party	Votes	%
Konstantin Podrezov	United Russia	8,607	49.36%
Anatoly Kuznetsov	A Just Russia — For Truth	3,066	17.58%
Marina Podlyagina	Communist Party	2,586	14.83%
Aleksandr Marinkov	Liberal Democratic Party	2,417	13.86%
Total		17,437	100%

==== District 22 ====
Summary of the 6–8 September 2024 Tula Oblast Duma election in District 22
Candidate	Party	Votes	%
Sergey Belov (incumbent)	United Russia	14,937	64.56%
Ivan Mironov	Communist Party	2,721	11.76%
Nailya Moiseyeva	Liberal Democratic Party	2,430	10.50%
Maksim Ushakov	A Just Russia — For Truth	2,100	9.08%
Total		23,138	100%

==== District 23 ====
Summary of the 6–8 September 2024 Tula Oblast Duma election in District 23
Candidate	Party	Votes	%
Dmitry Kozhenkin (incumbent)	United Russia	13,940	68.06%
Natalya Drozhzhina	Liberal Democratic Party	2,347	11.46%
Yevgeny Petrov	A Just Russia — For Truth	2,123	10.37%
Ivan Groznov	Communist Party	1,795	8.76%
Total		20,482	100%

==== District 24 ====
Summary of the 6–8 September 2024 Tula Oblast Duma election in District 24
Candidate	Party	Votes	%
Galina Alyoshina (incumbent)	United Russia	15,744	66.35%
Yekaterina Umnova	Liberal Democratic Party	5,378	22.66%
Pavel Dudakov	A Just Russia — For Truth	2,354	9.92%
Total		23,729	100%

=== Members ===
Incumbent deputies are highlighted with bold, elected members who declined to take a seat are marked with ~~strikethrough~~.

Constituency
No.	Member	Party
1	Denis Bychkov	United Russia
2	Aleksandr Rem	United Russia
3	Yelena Grebneva	United Russia
4	Marina Belkova	United Russia
5	Yekaterina Tolstaya	United Russia
6	Olga Slyusareva	United Russia
7	Sergey Galkin	United Russia
8	Sergey Baltabayev	United Russia
9	Nikolay Vorobyov	United Russia
10	Dmitry Afonichev	United Russia
11	Gennady Nikitin	United Russia
12	Andrey Tikhonov	United Russia
13	Pavel Mishunin	United Russia
14	Yury Moiseyev	Communists of Russia
15	Mikhail Ivantsov	United Russia
16	Sergey Grebenshchikov	A Just Russia – For Truth
17	Ilya Kurilov	United Russia
18	Dmitry Kharitonov	United Russia
19	Aleksandr Balberov	Liberal Democratic Party
20	Marina Levina	United Russia
21	Konstantin Podrezov	United Russia
22	Sergey Belov	United Russia
23	Dmitry Kozhenkin	United Russia
24	Galina Alyoshina	United Russia

Party lists
Member	Party
Ilya Stepanov	United Russia
Andrey Dubrovsky	United Russia
Eduard Kochenov	United Russia
Mikhail Borshchev	United Russia
Sergey Konov	United Russia
Anatoly Simonov	United Russia
Dmitry Fedotov	United Russia
Aleksandr Kovalyov	United Russia
Aleksey Lebedev	Communist Party
Svetlana Belous	Communist Party
Ilya Kindeyev	Liberal Democratic Party
Dmitry Androsov	A Just Russia – For Truth

== See also ==
- 2024 Russian elections
