= 2024 Tula Oblast gubernatorial election =

Election

- 6–8 September 2024
- Turnout: 49.48%
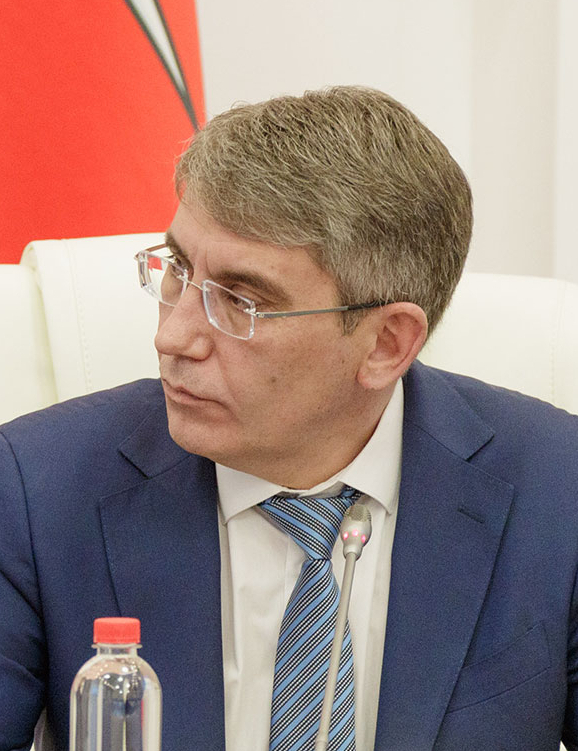

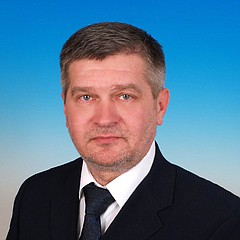
| | | CPRF |
| Candidate | Dmitry Milyayev | Aleksey Lebedev | Aleksandr Balberov |
| Party | United Russia | CPRF | LDPR |
| Popular vote | 441,763 | 38,077 | 35,183 |
| Percentage | 78.53% | 6.77% | 6.25% |
Governor before election
Dmitry Milyayev (acting)
United Russia
Governor-elect
Dmitry Milyayev
United Russia

The 2024 Tula Oblast gubernatorial election took place on 6–8 September 2024, on common election day, coinciding with 2024 Tula Oblast Duma election. Acting Governor Dmitry Milyayev was elected for a full term in office.

== Background ==
Then–Deputy Minister of Defense Aleksey Dyumin was appointed acting Governor of Tula Oblast in February 2016, replacing Vladimir Gruzdev. Dyumin ran for a full term in September 2016 as an independent and won the election with 84.17% of the vote. Dyumin was reelected to a second term in 2021 with 83.58%.

Dyumin, a close confidant of President Vladimir Putin and one of his so-called "adjutants", has been consistently considered for a potential promotion in defense or security services (as Minister of Defense or potential Minister of Defense Industry) but the governor himself denied those rumours. On May 14, 2024, President Putin appointed Governor Aleksey Dyumin as his aide in charge of military-industrial complex, sports, and State Council.

After his appointment, Governor Dyumin left Tula on May 14, 2024, leaving First Deputy Governor Dmitry Milyayev as acting Governor until the temporary replacement be appointed by the President. On May 15 President Putin appointed Dmitry Milyayev as acting Governor of Tula Oblast.

== Candidates ==
In Tula Oblast candidates for Governor can be nominated by registered political parties or by self-nomination. Candidate for Governor of Tula Oblast should be a Russian citizen and at least 30 years old. Candidates for Governor should not have a foreign citizenship or residence permit. Each candidate in order to be registered is required to collect at least 7% of signatures of members and heads of municipalities. In addition, self-nominated candidates should collect 2% of signatures of Tula Oblast residents. Also gubernatorial candidates present 3 candidacies to the Federation Council and election winner later appoints one of the presented candidates.

=== Declared ===
| Candidate name, political party | | Occupation | Status | Ref. |
|---|---|---|---|---|
| Aleksandr Balberov; Liberal Democratic Party | Aleksandr Balberov | Deputy Chairman of the Tula Oblast Duma (2014–present); Former Member of State Duma (2011–2014) | Registered | |
| Sergey Grebenshchikov; SR–ZP | | Member of Tula Oblast Duma (2019–present) | Registered | |
| Denis Ilyukhin; Communists of Russia | | Member of Aleksin Council of Deputies (2009–2014, 2019–present); Businessman | Registered | |
| Aleksey Lebedev; Communist Party | | Member of Tula City Duma (2010–2013, 2019–present); Former Member of Tula Oblast Duma (2013–2019); Brother of State Duma member Oleg Lebedev | Registered | |
| Dmitry Milyayev; United Russia | Dmitry Milyayev | Acting Governor of Tula Oblast (2024–present); Former First Deputy Governor of Tula Oblast (2022–2024) | Registered | |
| Sergey Bogomolov; Independent | | Individual entrepreneur | Did not file | |
| Vladimir Dorokhov; Yabloko | | Party representative to the Central Electoral Commission of Russia (2023–present); Individual entrepreneur | Did not file | |

=== Candidates for Federation Council ===
| Gubernatorial candidate, political party | Candidates for Federation Council | Status |
|---|---|---|
| Dmitry Milyayev; United Russia | * Konstantin Danilov, head of Rostec office in Tula Oblast (2013–present) * Dmitry Savelyev, incumbent Senator (2016–present) (Note: Senator Savelyev was arrested on August 2, 2024, during a Federation Council session on charges of attempted murder, however, without the official conviction Milyayev is unable to delist Savelyev as his senatorial candidate) * Nikolay Vorobyov, Chairman of the Tula Oblast Duma (2020–present), Member of the Duma (2009–present) | Registered |

== Results ==
Summary of the 6–8 September 2024 Tula Oblast gubernatorial election results
| Candidate | Party | Votes | % |
|---|---|---|---|
| Dmitry Milyayev (incumbent) | United Russia | 441,763 | 78.53 |
| Aleksey Lebedev | Communist Party | 38,077 | 6.77 |
| Aleksandr Balberov | Liberal Democratic Party | 35,183 | 6.25 |
| Sergey Grebenshchikov | A Just Russia – For Truth | 27,622 | 4.91 |
| Denis Ilyukhin | Communists of Russia | 11,651 | 2.07 |
| Valid votes | | 554,296 | 98.53 |
| Blank ballots | | 8,273 | 1.47 |
| Total | | 562,569 | 100.00 |
| Turnout | | 562,569 | 49.48 |
| Registered voters | | 1,136,990 | 100.00 |

Governor Milyayev appointed Tula Oblast Duma chairman Nikolay Vorobyov (United Russia) to the Federation Council, replacing incumbent Senator Dmitry Savelyev (United Russia), who was arrested on August 2, 2024, on charges of attempted murder.

== See also ==
- 2024 Russian regional elections
