= Mahmud-Ali Kalimatov =

Russian politician (born 1959)

- Махмуд-Али Калиматов
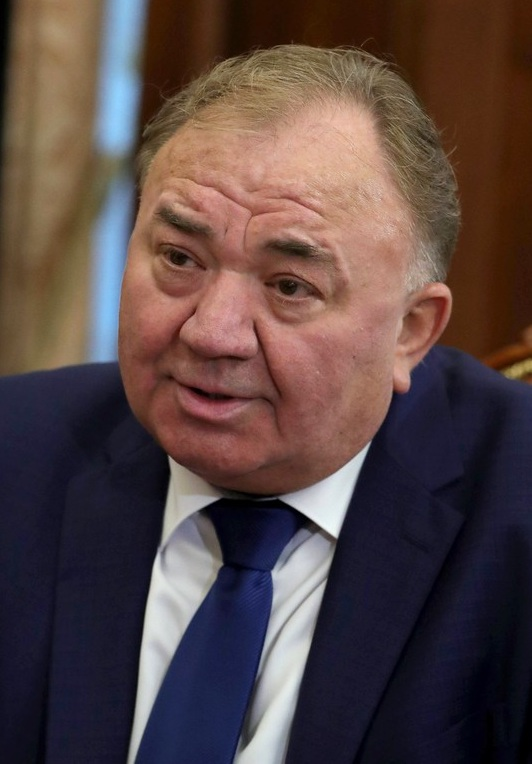
- Kalimatov in 2019

4th Head of the Republic of Ingushetia
- Incumbent
- Assumed office 26 June 2019 (Note: Acting until 8 September 2019)
- Prime Minister: Konstantin Surikov
- Preceded by: Yunus-Bek Yevkurov

Personal details
- Born: 9 April 1959 (age 67) Chemolgan, Kazakh SSR, Soviet Union
- Party: United Russia
- Children: 2

Military service
- Allegiance: Soviet Union
- Branch/service: Soviet Army

Mahmud-Ali Maksharipovich Kalimatov (Note: Russian: Махмуд-Али Макшарипович Калиматов; Ingush: Келаматнаькъан Макшарипа Махьмуд-Ӏаьла, romanized: Kelamatnäq̇an Makşaripa Maẋmud-Jäla) (born on 9 April 1959) is a Russian politician. He was appointed as the acting head of Ingushetia by Vladimir Putin on 26 June 2019, and was elected as the head of the republic on 8 September 2019.

== Early life and career ==
Mahmud-Ali Kalimatov was born in Chemolgan (present day Ushkonyr in Kazakhstan) on 9 April 1959.

From April 1977 to 1979, he served in the Soviet army based in East Germany.

=== Education ===
In 1989, he graduated from the law faculty of the Kuibyshev State University, and worked in the Republic of Komsomol and the Communist Party of the Republic of Kazakhstan of Kuibyshev.

=== Legislative career ===
Since 1990, in the service of the prosecution authorities of the Kuibyshev oblast, he began as an investigator of the district prosecutor's office.

In August 1995, he was appointed deputy prosecutor of the Kirov District of Samara.

==== Prosecutor of Samara ====
In December 1996, he was appointed prosecutor of the Kirov district of Samara.

From 1997 to 2003 he worked as a prosecutor of Samara.

From January 2003 to August 2004 he worked as the first deputy prosecutor of the Samara Oblast.

==== Prosecutor of Ingushetia ====
In August 2004, by order of the Prosecutor General of the Russian Federation, he was appointed prosecutor of the Republic of Ingushetia.

==== Governor's office in Samara Oblast ====
In 2007, he headed the control of the department to the governor of the Samara Oblast.

Since 2012, he worked as an adviser to the governor of the Samara Oblast.

=== Sanctions ===
He was sanctioned by the UK government in 2022 in relation to the Russian invasion of Ukraine.

== Head of Ingushetia ==
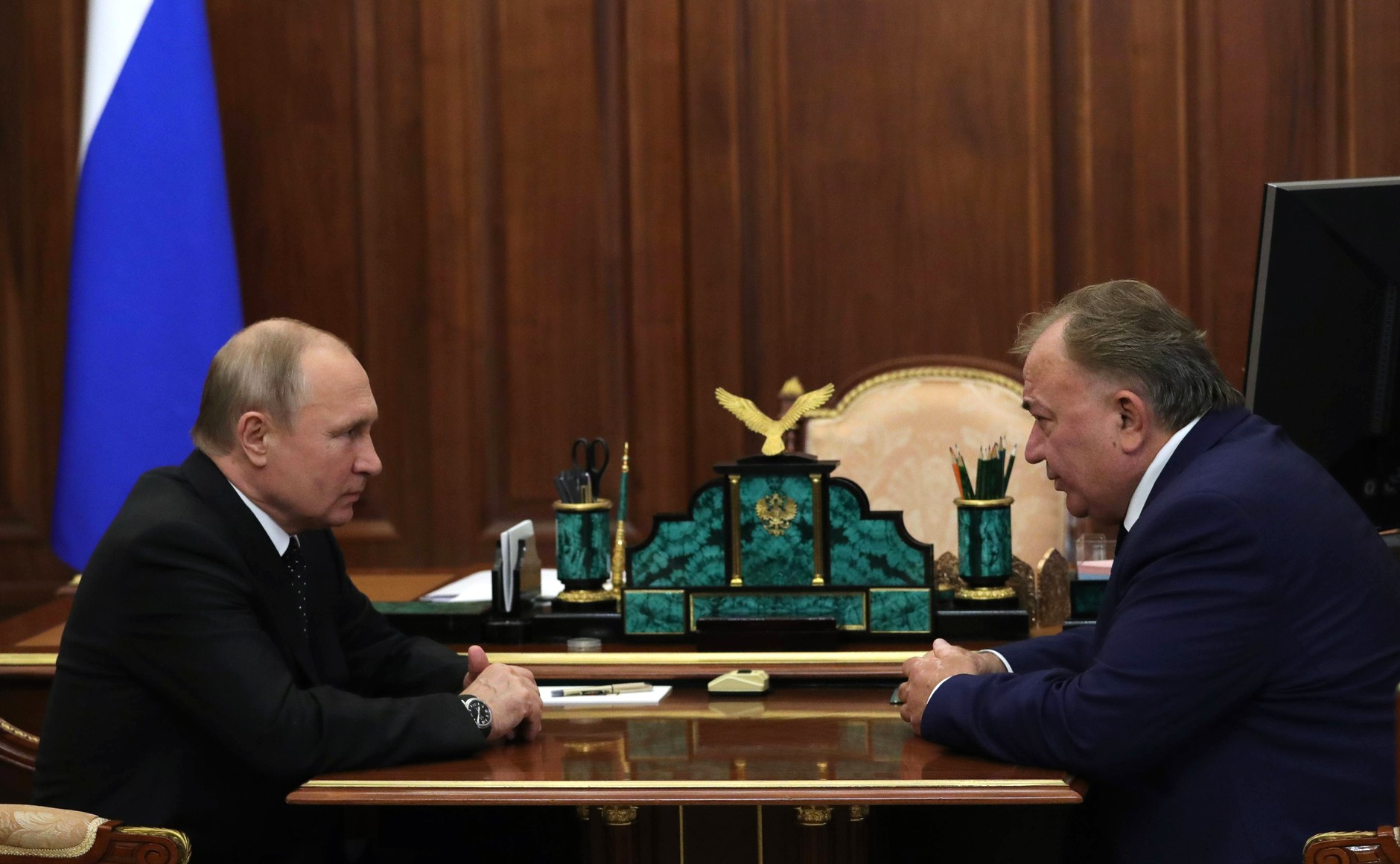
Mahmud-Ali Kalimatov with Russian President Vladimir Putin in June 2019

On June 26, 2019, Russian President Vladimir Putin appointed Kalimatov as the acting head of the Republic of Ingushetia after the resignation of Yunus-bek Yevkurov. Yevkurov's resignation came about following a long protest movement in the Republic over the 2018 Chechnya–Ingushetia border agreement. The protests began due to the nature of the agreement, with the population of Ingushetia only knowing of the agreement's existence after the deal was signed.

He was awarded the "Honorary Worker of the Prosecutor's Office of the Russian Federation." He was elected as Ingushetia's head by the People's Assembly of the Republic of Ingushetia on September 8, 2019 by receiving votes of 27 deputies of the 31 present, beating his rival candidates Magomed Zurabov and Uruskhan Evloev.

On January 27, 2020, Kalimatov dismissed the government of Ingushetia for unclear reasons, appointing an ethnic Russian, Konstantin Surikov, as the Prime Minister of the Republic.

Kalimatov was re-elected as Head in the 2024 Russian elections.

== Family ==
Kamilatov was married and has two sons. Kalimatov is the brother-in-law of the former head of Ingushetia, Murat Zyazikov, who headed the republic in 2002–2008. They are married to sisters. He had two brothers Alikhan, and Magomed-Bashir. Alikhan (1969–2007), was an employee of the operational investigative department of the Service for the Protection of the Constitutional System and the Fight against Terrorism of the Federal Security Service, a Lt. Colonel. He was posthumously awarded Hero of the Russian Federation, after he died during shelling by unknown persons in 2007. Magomed-Bashir (born 23 February 1958) is currently the director of the Office of the Federal Postal Service of the Russian Federation for the Republic of Ingushetia. Previously, he was the head of the municipality of Ordzhonikidzevskaya.

== Awards ==
- Honorary employee of the Prosecutor's office of the Russian Federation

== See also ==
- Deportation of the Chechens and Ingush
