= 2024 Russian elections =

- 8 September 2024; 17 March 2024 (presidential)
- Gubernatorial Legislative Gubernatorial and legislative

The 2024 Russian elections were held in large part, on Sunday, 8 September 2024 (single election day), with several regions allowing voting on 6 and 7 September. There were three by-elections to the 8th State Duma, 19 gubernatorial elections (16 direct and three indirectly elected), 13 regional parliamentary elections, and many elections on the municipal level.

== Federal elections ==
=== Presidential election ===
Candidate	Party	Votes	%
Vladimir Putin	Independent (Note: Supported by the People's Front, United Russia, A Just Russia – For Truth, Rodina, Russian Party of Pensioners for Social Justice, Party of Business, Russian All-People's Union and Democratic Party of Russia)	76,277,708	88.48
Nikolay Kharitonov	Communist Party	3,768,470	4.37
Vladislav Davankov	New People	3,362,484	3.90
Leonid Slutsky	Liberal Democratic Party	2,795,629	3.24
Total		86,204,291	100.00
Valid votes		86,204,291	98.43
Invalid/blank votes		1,371,784	1.57
Total votes		87,576,075	100.00
Registered voters/turnout		113,011,059	77.49
Source: Rapsi News, Bezformata

=== State Duma by-elections ===
Constituency	Former MP	Party	Elected MP	Party
Khakassia	Sergey Sokol until 15 September 2023	United Russia	Nikolay Shulginov	Independent
Southern	Vitaly Kushnarev until 27 May 2024	United Russia	Viktoria Abramchenko	United Russia
Unecha	Nikolay Alekseyenko until 28 May 2024	United Russia	Oleg Matytsin	United Russia

== Regional elections ==
=== Gubernatorial direct elections ===
All incumbent governors and heads of autonomous regions were reelected.

Region	Incumbent	Status	Last race	Result
Altai Republic	Oleg Khorokhordin (IND)	Resigned	2019: 58.82%	—
Altai Republic	Andrey Turchak (UR)	Acting Governor elected	—	2024: 74.09%
Bashkortostan	Radiy Khabirov (UR)	Incumbent Head re-elected	2019: 82.02%	2024: 80.21%
Kalmykia	Batu Khasikov (UR)	Incumbent Head re-elected	2019: 82.54%	2024: 79.95%
Khabarovsk Krai	Mikhail Degtyarev (LDPR)	Resigned	2021: 56.77%	—
Khabarovsk Krai	Dmitry Demeshin (UR)	Acting Governor elected	—	2024: 81.03%
Stavropol Krai	Vladimir Vladimirov (UR)	Incumbent Governor re-elected	2019: 79.64%	2024: 79.61%
Zabaykalsky Krai	Aleksandr Osipov (IND)	Incumbent Governor re-elected	2019: 89.61%	2024: 82.27%
Astrakhan Oblast	Igor Babushkin (UR)	Incumbent Governor re-elected	2019: 75.63%	2024: 78.17%
Chelyabinsk Oblast	Aleksey Teksler (UR)	Incumbent Governor re-elected	2019: 69.30%	2024: 81.28%
Kaliningrad Oblast	Anton Alikhanov (UR)	Resigned	2022: 80.21%	—
Kaliningrad Oblast	Aleksey Besprozvannykh (UR)	Acting Governor elected	—	2024: 76.55%
Kemerovo Oblast	Sergey Tsivilyov (UR)	Resigned	2023: 85.23%	—
Kemerovo Oblast	Ilya Seredyuk (UR)	Acting Governor elected	—	2024: 78.38%
Kurgan Oblast	Vadim Shumkov (UR)	Incumbent Governor re-elected	2019: 80.86%	2024: 85.17%
Kursk Oblast	Roman Starovoyt (UR)	Resigned	2019: 81.07%	—
Kursk Oblast	Aleksey Smirnov (UR)	Acting Governor elected	—	2024: 65.28%
Lipetsk Oblast	Igor Artamonov (UR)	Incumbent Governor re-elected	2019: 67.28%	2024: 81.16%
Murmansk Oblast	Andrey Chibis (UR)	Incumbent Governor re-elected	2019: 60.07%	2024: 73.99%
Orenburg Oblast	Denis Pasler (UR)	Incumbent Governor re-elected	2019: 65.94%	2024: 78.14%
Sakhalin Oblast	Valery Limarenko (UR)	Incumbent Governor re-elected	2019: 56.14%	2024: 80.79%
Samara Oblast	Dmitry Azarov (UR)	Resigned	2023: 83.82%	—
Samara Oblast	Vyacheslav Fedorishchev (UR)	Acting Governor elected	—	2024: 79.56%
Tula Oblast	Aleksey Dyumin (IND)	Resigned	2021: 83.58%	—
Tula Oblast	Dmitry Milyayev (UR)	Acting Governor elected	—	2024: 78.53%
Volgograd Oblast	Andrey Bocharov (UR)	Incumbent Governor re-elected	2019: 76.80%	2024: 79.68%
Vologda Oblast	Oleg Kuvshinnikov (UR)	Resigned	2019: 60.79%	—
Vologda Oblast	Georgy Filimonov (UR)	Acting Governor elected	—	2024: 62.30%
Saint Petersburg	Alexander Beglov (UR)	Incumbent Governor re-elected	2019: 64.43%	2024: 59.80%

=== Gubernatorial indirect elections ===
Territories that are internationally recognised as part of Ukraine are highlighted with beige.

Region	Incumbent	Status	Last race	Result
Crimea	Sergey Aksyonov (UR)	Incumbent Head re-elected	2019: 74/74	Sergey Aksyonov 75 / 75
Kabardino-Balkaria	Kazbek Kokov (UR)	Incumbent Head re-elected	2019: 70/70	Kazbek Kokov 69 / 69
Ingushetia	Makhmud-Ali Kalimatov (UR)	Incumbent Head re-elected	2019: 27/31	Makhmud-Ali Kalimatov 25 / 32
Khanty-Mansi Autonomous Okrug	Natalya Komarova (UR)	Resigned	2020: 29/38	—
Khanty-Mansi Autonomous Okrug	Ruslan Kukharuk (UR)	Acting Governor elected	—	Ruslan Kukharuk 33 / 36

=== Legislative elections ===
Territories that are internationally recognised as part of Ukraine are highlighted with beige.

Legislature	Seats	Voting system	Majority in last election		Majority after election	
Altai Republic	41	Parallel (11 party list + 30 SMC)	United Russia	25 / 41	United Russia	37 / 41
Crimea	75	Parallel (50 party list + 25 SMC)	United Russia	60 / 75	United Russia	71 / 75
Kabardino-Balkaria	70	Party-list proportional representation	United Russia	50 / 70	United Russia	50 / 70
Karachay-Cherkessia	50	Party-list proportional representation	United Russia	34 / 50	United Russia	34 / 50
Mari El	52	Parallel (13 party list + 39 SMC)	United Russia	33 / 52	United Russia	48 / 52
Tatarstan	100	Parallel (50 party list + 50 SMC)	United Russia	85 / 100	United Russia	86 / 100
Tuva	32	Parallel (16 party list + 16 SMC)	United Russia	30 / 32	United Russia	26 / 32
Khabarovsk Krai	36	Parallel (12 party list + 24 SMC)	LDPR	30 / 36	United Russia	27 / 36
Bryansk Oblast	60	Parallel (30 party list + 30 SMC)	United Russia	48 / 60	United Russia	51 / 60
Tula Oblast	36	Parallel (12 party list + 24 SMC)	United Russia	27 / 36	United Russia	29 / 36
Volgograd Oblast	38	Parallel (19 party list + 19 SMC)	United Russia	28 / 38	United Russia	28 / 38
Moscow	45	First-past-the-post	Independent	26 / 45	United Russia	38 / 45
Sevastopol	24	Parallel (16 party list + 8 SMC)	United Russia	14 / 24	United Russia	20 / 24

=== Legislative by-elections ===
Constituency		Incumbent		This Race	
Legislature	No	Former member	Party	Results	Candidates
State Council of the Komi Republic	11	Aleksandr Gayvoronsky	United Russia	Incumbent resigned June 21, 2023; New member elected September 8, 2024; United Russia hold	▌ ✓ Vladimir Blokhin (United Russia) 58.81%; ▌ Tatyana Ustinova (CPRF) 25.36%; ▌ Ilya Velichko (SR–ZP) 6.84%; ▌ Yekaterina Safarova (LDPR) 6.46%
Legislative Assembly of Saint Petersburg	18	Aleksey Dalmatov	United Russia	Incumbent resigned June 28, 2023; New member elected September 8, 2024; United Russia hold	▌ ✓ Aleksandr Malkevich (United Russia) 55.45%; ▌ Aleksandr Mikhaylov (CPRF) 12.56%; ▌ Andrey Denisov (New People) 10.92%; ▌ Yevgeny Yenenkov (LDPR) 8.97%; ▌ Aleksandr Kolos (SR–ZP) 8.67%
Legislative Assembly of Kamchatka Krai	11	Yury Lomakin	United Russia	Incumbent resigned July 25, 2023; New member elected September 8, 2024; United Russia hold	▌ ✓ Sergey Lozovsky (United Russia) 51.21%; ▌ Darya Suchilina (New People) 15.14%; ▌ Aleksey Nikolayev (SR–ZP) 13.02%; ▌ Sergey Kutsevich (CPRF) 9.71%; ▌ Oksana Melnichenko (LDPR) 9.12%
Legislative Assembly of Perm Krai	12	Viktor Baranov	United Russia	Incumbent died September 7, 2023; New member elected September 8, 2024; United Russia hold	▌ ✓ Oleg Kalinsky (United Russia) 49.20%; ▌ Vladimir Brazhnikov (LDPR) 14.34%; ▌ Oleg Georgiyev (CPRF) 12.00%; ▌ Tatyana Shmalts (SR–ZP) 11.94%; ▌ Andrey Shchelkanov (CPCR) 4.09%; ▌ Vyacheslav Kiroyev (RPPSS) 4.00%
Legislative Assembly of Kaluga Oblast	15	Aleksandr Yefremov	United Russia	Incumbent resigned September 18, 2023, to become Minister of Agriculture of Kaluga Oblast; New member elected September 8, 2024; United Russia hold	▌ ✓ Pyotr Bobylyov (United Russia) 65.78%; ▌ Sergey Klimov (LDPR) 15.70%; ▌ Larisa Vedasheva (SR–ZP) 8.18%; ▌ Ivan Motsok (CPRF) 7.81%
Arkhangelsk Oblast Assembly of Deputies	23	Ivan Novikov	United Russia	Incumbent resigned September 22, 2023, to become Senator of the Federation Council; New member elected September 8, 2024; United Russia hold	▌ ✓ Mikhail Fedotov (United Russia) 38.00%; ▌ Igor Titkov (CPRF) 22.51%; ▌ Aleksandr Kholodov (LDPR) 21.82%; ▌ Eduard Kobylin (SR–ZP) 10.31%; ▌ Vladimir Durasov (New People) 3.11%; ▌ Yekaterina Zaborshchikova (CPCR) 2.26%
Legislative Assembly of Primorsky Krai	10	Aleksandr Rolik	United Russia	Incumbent resigned September 26, 2023, to become Senator of the Federation Council; New member elected September 8, 2024; United Russia hold	▌ ✓ Konstantin Sidenko (United Russia) 66.30%; ▌ Galina Kubasova (CPRF) 13.30%; ▌ Oleg Grachyov (SR–ZP) 10.62%; ▌ Vyacheslav Gnezdilov (LDPR) 8.71%
Yaroslavl Oblast Duma	31	Natalia Kosikhina	United Russia	Incumbent resigned September 26, 2023, to become Senator of the Federation Council; New member elected September 8, 2024; United Russia hold	▌ ✓ Nikolay Kostrov (United Russia) 71.63%; ▌ Natalia Bobryakova (CPRF) 12.59%; ▌ Aleksey Kustov (SR–ZP) 6.20%; ▌ Irina Lobanova (LDPR) 4.34%; ▌ Yulia Ovchinnikova (RPPSS) 3.63%
Smolensk Oblast Duma	12	Artyom Malashchenkov	United Russia	Incumbent resigned September 28, 2023, to become Senator of the Federation Council; New member elected September 8, 2024; United Russia hold	▌ ✓ Aleksandr Kapustin (United Russia) 74.04%; ▌ Tatyana Belikhina (CPRF) 13.86%; ▌ Aleksandr Kobzarev (LDPR) 9.78%
State Assembly of the Sakha Republic	34	Sakhamin Afanasyev	United Russia	Incumbent resigned October 4, 2023, to become Senator of the Federation Council; New member elected September 8, 2024; United Russia hold	▌ ✓ Yevgeny Sleptsov (United Russia) 74.46%; ▌ Vyacheslav Shadrin (New People) 13.24%; ▌ Semyon Makarov (LDPR) 7.14%; ▌ Aleksandr Shvets (Rodina) 2.61%
Legislative Assembly of Orenburg Oblast	9	Aleksandr Kuznetsov	United Russia	Incumbent resigned October 12, 2023, due to holding a foreign bank account New member elected September 8, 2024; United Russia hold	▌ ✓ Yelena Ivanova (United Russia) 58.71%; ▌ Mikhail Mishuchkov (CPRF) 8.72%; ▌ Renat Gilmutdinov (New People) 8.56%; ▌ Yelizaveta Anisova (RPPSS) 8.41%; ▌ Andrey Reyzler (LDPR) 5.61%; ▌ Yevgeny Shivlyagin (SR–ZP) 5.15%
State Assembly of the Republic of Bashkortostan	54	Vilory Ugarov	United Russia	Incumbent resigned October 13, 2023; New member elected September 8, 2024; Independent gain	▌ ✓ Elvira Matskevich (Independent) 54.55%; ▌ Ildus Ulmutayev (CPRF) 25.27%; ▌ Lyaysan Garipova (LDPR) 18.93%
Tyumen Oblast Duma	3	Vladimir Pushkarev	United Russia	Incumbent resigned October 13, 2023, to become Senator of the Federation Council; New member elected September 8, 2024; United Russia hold	▌ ✓ Aleksandr Mazharov (United Russia) 53.30%; ▌ Sergey Shvidchenko (LDPR) 17.25%; ▌ Anna Golubeva (CPRF) 15.95%; ▌ Viktor Ushakov (SR–ZP) 11.95%
Duma of Astrakhan Oblast	13	Viktor Fyodorov	United Russia	Incumbent expelled October 23, 2023, after being indicted for fraud New member elected September 8, 2024; United Russia hold	▌ ✓ Aleksandr Nevalyonny (United Russia) 61.82%; ▌ Andrey Gabrielov (SR–ZP) 15.00%; ▌ Sabir Dusabaliyev (CPRF) 9.95%; ▌ Nadezhda Yagupova (New People) 7.53%; ▌ Amir Tanin (Rodina) 4.77%
Legislative Assembly of Tver Oblast	15	Vladimir Mishchenko	United Russia	Incumbent resigned October 27, 2023, to become Head of Bologovsky District; New member elected September 8, 2024; United Russia hold	▌ ✓ Svetlana Vasilyeva (United Russia) 59.45%; ▌ Dmitry Fisenko (CPRF) 11.37%; ▌ Gennady Chukovin (SR–ZP) 8.48%; ▌ Ksenia Ganenko (RPPSS) 7.86%; ▌ Aleksey Smirnov (LDPR) 5.63%; ▌ Varvara Kasyanova (CPCR) 4.16%
Legislative Assembly of Novosibirsk Oblast	3	Vladimir Laptev	United Russia	Incumbent resigned October 26, 2023, after being charged with fraud New member elected September 8, 2024; United Russia hold	▌ ✓ Sergey Smirnov (United Russia) 61.48%; ▌ Sergey Zarembo (CPRF) 20.62%; ▌ Olga Zuyeva (LDPR) 5.00%; ▌ Vera Guzheva (RPPSS) 3.76%; ▌ Nikolay Zavalishin (SR–ZP) 3.45%; ▌ Farid Minnibayev (New People) 2.68%
Legislative Assembly of Krasnoyarsk Krai	10	Roman Goldman	United Russia	Incumbent expelled November 23, 2023, after being indicted for negligent possession of a firearm New member elected September 8, 2024; United Russia hold	▌ ✓ Yevgeny Garin (United Russia) 53.67%; ▌ Alyona Bakaykina (SR–ZP) 12.19%; ▌ Sergey Kuznetsov (RPPSS) 10.48%; ▌ Yelena Rodikova (CPRF) 9.26%; ▌ Vitaly Telin (Rodina) 5.96%; ▌ Yelena Chubko (New People) 4.75%
Legislative Assembly of Zabaykalsky Krai	1	Viktoria Bessonova	United Russia	Incumbent resigned November 24, 2023, to become Deputy Chairwoman of the Government of Zabaykalsky Krai; New member elected September 8, 2024; United Russia hold	▌ ✓ Sergey Novichenko (United Russia) 35.64%; ▌ Dmitry Korepanov (LDPR) 20.47%; ▌ Darya Kalinina (SR–ZP) 17.19%; ▌ Igor Mezentsev (CPRF) 16.80%
Altai Krai Legislative Assembly	21	Ivan Nifontov	United Russia	Incumbent resigned December 1, 2023, to become Minister of Sport of Altai Krai; New member elected September 8, 2024; United Russia hold	▌ ✓ Yevgeny Grigorenko (United Russia) 52.93%; ▌ Oksana Molodykh (SR–ZP) 16.71%; ▌ Igor Strantsov (New People) 8.12%; ▌ Anna Yufereva (LDPR) 8.11%; ▌ Vladimir Gulyayev (Communists of Russia) 7.50%; ▌ Matias Denitz (CPRF) 5.68%
Novgorod Oblast Duma	1	Anatoly Osipov	United Russia	Incumbent resigned December 13, 2023, after being indicted for abuse of power New member elected September 8, 2024; United Russia hold	▌ ✓ Anatoly Sevostyanov (United Russia) 59.85%; ▌ Natalya Tikhomirova (CPRF) 11.41%; ▌ Yevgeny Vasilyev (LDPR) 9.72%; ▌ Svetlana Zimneva (RPPSS) 7.55%; ▌ Mikhail Panov (SR–ZP) 6.15%; ▌ Ksenia Cherepanova (Yabloko) 1.96%
Murmansk Oblast Duma	15	Oleg Samarsky	United Russia	Incumbent expelled February 1, 2024, after being indicted for abuse of power New member elected September 8, 2024; United Russia hold	▌ ✓ Larisa Orlova (United Russia) 64.14%; ▌ Artyom Slepukhin (CPRF) 18.57%; ▌ Roman Pavlikovsky (LDPR) 7.23%; ▌ Tatyana Shamanina (RPPSS) 6.97%
Legislative Assembly of Orenburg Oblast	18	Ildar Iskakov	United Russia	Incumbent resigned March 27, 2023; New member elected September 8, 2024; United Russia hold	▌ ✓ Anatoly Kolestinsky (United Russia) 49.78%; ▌ Aleksandr Petrov (LDPR) 14.69%; ▌ Yury Kozhemyakin (SR–ZP) 14.13%; ▌ Ilvir Kaipov (CPRF) 13.72%
Ryazan Oblast Duma	12	Igor Murog	United Russia	Incumbent resigned April 2, 2024, to become Senator of the Federation Council; New member elected September 8, 2024; United Russia hold	▌ ✓ Roman Igolkin (United Russia) 75.98%; ▌ Vladimir Yakunin (CPRF) 9.45%; ▌ Yevgeny Myasin (LDPR) 7.53%; ▌ Tatyana Starkova (RPPSS) 5.66%
Legislative Assembly of Vologda Oblast	2	Denis Dolzhenko	United Russia	Incumbent resigned April 24, 2024; New member elected September 8, 2024; United Russia hold	▌ ✓ Sergey Tomilov (United Russia) 37.01%; ▌ Marina Komarnitskaya (CPRF) 19.67%; ▌ Tatyana Yermakova (LDPR) 17.00%
Duma of Khanty-Mansi Autonomous Okrug — Yugra	2	Pyotr Sozonov	United Russia	Incumbent resigned April 26, 2024; New member elected September 8, 2024; United Russia hold	▌ ✓ Dmitry Aksyonov (United Russia) 53.44%; ▌ Artyom Aminov (CPRF) 16.10%; ▌ Aleksandr Kurpitko (SR–ZP) 8.52%; ▌ Nikolay Timchenko (LDPR) 7.41%; ▌ Guliko Nemazenko (RPPSS) 5.84%; ▌ Maksim Logachev (Communists of Russia) 5.07%
Duma of Chukotka Autonomous Okrug	2 (Note: Members of the Duma of Chukotka Autonomous Okrug are elected in three-mandate constituencies. The by-elections are held if at least two members from the constituency resign their seats.)	Anastasia Zhukova	United Russia	Incumbent resigned October 1, 2021, to become Senator of the Federation Council; New member elected September 8, 2024; United Russia hold	▌ ✓ Leonid Nikolayev (United Russia) 67.86%; ▌ ✓ Ignat Skobelev (United Russia) 48.10%; ▌ Denis Tikhomirov (Independent) 21.08%; ▌ Aleksey Pershin (Independent) 19.32%
Duma of Chukotka Autonomous Okrug	2	Ksenia Nesterova	Independent	Incumbent resigned May 22, 2024; New member elected September 8, 2024; United Russia gain	▌ ✓ Leonid Nikolayev (United Russia) 67.86%; ▌ ✓ Ignat Skobelev (United Russia) 48.10%; ▌ Denis Tikhomirov (Independent) 21.08%; ▌ Aleksey Pershin (Independent) 19.32%
Duma of Chukotka Autonomous Okrug	1	Yulia Bobkova	United Russia	Incumbent resigned May 22, 2024; New member elected September 8, 2024; United Russia hold	▌ ✓ Dmitry Ivanov (United Russia) 69.91%; ▌ ✓ Telman Feroyan (United Russia) 55.08%; ▌ Dmitry Timofeyev (Independent) 21.23%; ▌ Gleb Fariseyev (Independent) 12.07%
Duma of Chukotka Autonomous Okrug	1	Igor Ivanov	United Russia	Incumbent resigned May 22, 2024; New member elected September 8, 2024; United Russia hold	▌ ✓ Dmitry Ivanov (United Russia) 69.91%; ▌ ✓ Telman Feroyan (United Russia) 55.08%; ▌ Dmitry Timofeyev (Independent) 21.23%; ▌ Gleb Fariseyev (Independent) 12.07%
Legislative Assembly of Perm Krai	20	Aleksey Inyutkin	United Russia	Incumbent resigned May 23, 2024; New member elected September 8, 2024; United Russia hold	▌ ✓ Olga Sudneva (United Russia) 58.13%; ▌ Yelena Shabashova (SR–ZP) 12.15%; ▌ Vyacheslav Bulyshev (CPRF) 9.69%; ▌ Valery Batov (New People) 5.42%; ▌ Mikhail Dyachkov (CPCR) 4.14%; ▌ Yan Romanov (LDPR) 3.50%; ▌ Sergey Sozinov (RPPSS) 2.80%
State Council of the Republic of Tatarstan	34	Vacant		Election on September 6–8, 2024 was cancelled after all candidates withdrew New member elected December 1, 2024; Independent gain	▌ ✓ Nail Zalakov (Independent) 70.23%; ▌ Olga Isayeva (SR–ZP) 15.28%; ▌ Andrey Kharin (LDPR) 13.34%

== Municipal elections ==
=== Mayoral ===
City	Incumbent	Status	Last race	Results
Abakan (Khakassia)	Aleksey Lyomin (UR)	Re-elected	2019: 87.16%	▌ ✓ Aleksey Lyomin (inc.) (United Russia) 74.58%; ▌ Oleg Golovchenko (CPRF) 12.33%; ▌ Vitaly Glebov (LDPR) 6.57%; ▌ Vasily Meltser (Independent) 4.19%
Sorsk (Khakassia)	Vladimir Naydyonov (IND)	Lost re-election	2019: 49.02%	▌ ✓ Marina Guray (United Russia) 63.46%; ▌ Vladimir Naydyonov (inc.) (Independent) 29.79%; ▌ Artyom Kononov (LDPR) 1.85%; ▌ Sergey Katyshev (Communists of Russia) 1.27%; ▌ Igor Preminin (Independent) 0.91%
Srednekolymsk (Sakha Republic)	Nikolay Chukrov (IND)	Retiring	2019: 58.21%	▌ ✓ Ksenofont Krivoshapkin (United Russia) 72.88%; ▌ Nikolay Okoneshnikov (Independent) 15.92%; ▌ Ravil Shaykhutdinov (Independent) 7.75%
Zhatay (Sakha Republic)	Yevgenia Isayeva (UR)	Re-elected	2019: 65.54%	▌ ✓ Yevgenia Isayeva (inc.) (United Russia) 46.37%; ▌ Ivan Lavrov (Independent) 24.53%; ▌ Igor Bugayenko (CPRF) 15.61%; ▌ Grigory Kuznetsov (SR–ZP) 7.78%; ▌ Dmitry Chibirev (LDPR) 2.23%; ▌ Angelina Mateychik (New People) 0.57%
Komsomolsk-on-Amur (Khabarovsk Krai)	Aleksandr Zhornik (LDPR)	Retiring	2019: 55.63%	▌ ✓ Dmitry Zaplutayev (United Russia) 43.77%; ▌ Vladimir Ginzburg (LDPR) 26.23%; ▌ Sergey Yuganov (SR–ZP) 13.99%; ▌ Roman Kviring (CPRF) 5.35%; ▌ Stanislav Shuvayev (Communists of Russia) 4.08%
Nerchinsk (Zabaykalsky Krai)	Natalya Argunova (IND) acting mayor	Retiring	–	▌ ✓ Natalya Chernova (United Russia) 61.20%; ▌ Aleksey Panteleyev (Independent) 32.42%
Sretensk (Zabaykalsky Krai)	Roman Graselius (IND) acting mayor	Retiring	–	▌ ✓ Mikhail Kasyanov (United Russia) 67.50%; ▌ Nadezhda Plesina (SR–ZP) 29.68%
Belogorsk (Amur Oblast)	Stanislav Melyukov (UR)	Re-elected	2020: 61.08%	▌ ✓ Stanislav Melyukov (inc.) (United Russia) 73.69%; ▌ Gennady Popov (LDPR) 14.52%; ▌ Viktor Martynov (SR–ZP) 6.91%; ▌ Kirill Lekomtsev (New People) 2.79%
Bratsk (Irkutsk Oblast)	Sergey Serebrennikov (UR)	Lost re-election	2019: 43.34%	▌ ✓ Aleksandr Dubrovin (Independent) 68.55%; ▌ Sergey Serebrennikov (inc.) (United Russia) 21.89%; ▌ Yekaterina Anisimova (Communists of Russia) 2.15%; ▌ Konstantin Klimov (LDPR) 2.05%; ▌ Dmitry Yablontsev (New People) 1.18%; ▌ Anastasia Shinkarenko (Civic Platform) 1.05%
Sayansk (Irkutsk Oblast)	Maria Danilova (IND) acting mayor	Retiring	–	▌ ✓ Aleksandr Yermakov (United Russia) 70.64%; ▌ Yekaterina Strakh (LDPR) 13.30%; ▌ Natalya Yurtayeva (CPRF) 11.39%
Tulun (Irkutsk Oblast)	Tatyana Yakubova (IND) acting mayor	Retiring	–	▌ ✓ Mikhail Gildebrant (United Russia) 33.30%; ▌ Artyom Pavlechko (Independent) 17.19%; ▌ Oleg Ivanov (Independent) 11.77%; ▌ Vyacheslav Shevelyov (SR–ZP) 9.94%; ▌ Sergey Marinov (Communists of Russia) 9.81%; ▌ Vladimir Goryunov (New People) 4.64%; ▌ Oleg Korbatov (LDPR) 3.81%; ▌ Yekaterina Volna (Independent) 2.36%
Ust-Ilimsk (Irkutsk Oblast)	Anna Shchyokina (LDPR)	Retiring	2019: 44.04%	▌ ✓ Eduard Simonov (United Russia) 67.31%; ▌ Natalya Shestakova (CPRF) 10.60%; ▌ Sergey Tyutyunnik (Independent) 5.16%; ▌ Vasily Yakimov (LDPR) 4.55%; ▌ Ivan Patskevich (SR–ZP) 4.38%; ▌ Gennady Guler (Independent) 2.58%; ▌ Aleksandra Bulgakova (RPSS) 1.26%
Murom (Vladimir Oblast)	Yevgeny Rychkov (UR)	Re-elected	2019: 81.37%	▌ ✓ Yevgeny Rychkov (inc.) (United Russia) 81.63%; ▌ Sergey Kornishov (LDPR) 5.68%; ▌ Dmitry Bocharov (CPRF) 5.40%; ▌ Roman Zekin (PSZ) 2.09%; ▌ Aleksandr Panfyorov (SR–ZP) 1.68%; ▌ Dmitry Zharyonov (PVR) 1.43%
Anadyr (Chukotka AO)	Leonid Nikolayev (UR)	Retiring	2019: 49.21%	▌ ✓ Sergey Spitsyn (United Russia) 61.93%; ▌ Vladimir Galtsov (CPRF) 16.09%; ▌ Ivan Semizorov (LDPR) 11.95%; ▌ Gleb Fariseyev (Independent) 4.97%

=== Municipal Councils ===
Territories that are internationally recognised as part of Ukraine are highlighted with beige.

Municipal body	Seats	Voting system	Majority in last election		Majority after election	
Ulan-Ude City Council of Deputies (Buryatia)	30	First-past-the-post	United Russia	24 / 30	United Russia	29 / 30
Simferopol City Council (Crimea)	38	Parallel (19 party list + 19 SMC)	United Russia	31 / 38	United Russia	36 / 38
Elista City Assembly (Kalmykia)	25	Parallel (18 party list + 7 SMC)	United Russia	17 / 25	United Russia	18 / 25
Council of Deputies of Yoshkar-Ola (Mari El)	35	First-past-the-post	United Russia	16 / 35	United Russia	34 / 35
Council of Representatives of Vladikavkaz (North Ossetia)	32	Parallel (16 party list + 16 SMC)	United Russia	20 / 32	United Russia	23 / 32
Khabarovsk City Duma (Khabarovsk Krai)	35	First-past-the-post	LDPR	34 / 35	United Russia	34 / 35
Duma of Chita (Zabaykalsky Krai)	30	First-past-the-post	United Russia	19 / 30	United Russia	27 / 30
Blagoveshchensk City Duma (Amur Oblast)	30	First-past-the-post	United Russia	25 / 30	United Russia	25 / 30
Bryansk City Council of People's Deputies (Bryansk Oblast)	32	Parallel (16 party list + 16 SMC)	United Russia	25 / 32	United Russia	26 / 32
Chelyabinsk City Duma (Note: In 2014 and 2019 Chelyabinsk City Duma members were proportionally delegated from seven city districts, however, the two-tier system of local government was abolished in March 2024 and direct duma elections were scheduled for September 2024) (Chelyabinsk Oblast)	37	Parallel (12 party list + 25 SMC)	United Russia	43 / 49	United Russia	30 / 37
Duma of Irkutsk (Irkutsk Oblast)	35	First-past-the-post	United Russia	13 / 35	United Russia	30 / 35
Kurgan City Duma (Kurgan Oblast)	26	Parallel (13 party list + 13 SMC)	United Russia	17 / 26	United Russia	19 / 26
Council of Deputies of Murmansk (Murmansk Oblast)	25	First-past-the-post	United Russia	25 / 30	United Russia	20 / 25
Penza City Duma (Penza Oblast)	35	Parallel (10 party list + 25 SMC)	United Russia	19 / 35	United Russia	27 / 35
City Duma of Yuzhno-Sakhalinsk (Sakhalin Oblast)	25	First-past-the-post	United Russia	15 / 25	United Russia	19 / 25
Tula City Duma (Penza Oblast)	35	Parallel (15 party list + 20 SMC)	United Russia	26 / 35	United Russia	27 / 35
Vologda City Duma (Vologda Oblast)	30	First-past-the-post	United Russia	27 / 30	United Russia	27 / 30
Municipal Councils of Saint Petersburg	1,560	Plurality block	United Russia	949 / 1,560	United Russia	1,310 / 1,560
City Duma of Birobidzhan (Jewish AO)	21	First-past-the-post	United Russia	10 / 21	United Russia	17 / 21
Council of Deputies of Anadyr (Chukotka AO)	15	First-past-the-post	United Russia	5 / 15	United Russia	12 / 15
Council of Naryan-Mar (Nenets AO)	15	First-past-the-post	United Russia	14 / 15	United Russia	15 / 15
City Duma of Salekhard (Yamalo-Nenets AO)	21	First-past-the-post	United Russia	20 / 21	United Russia	18 / 21

== Conduct ==
On 21 August 2024, the Central Election Commission ordered the postponement of voting in seven municipalities of Kursk Oblast that were occupied by Ukraine during the August 2024 Kursk Oblast incursion. It later called on authorities in Crimea and six other regions bordering Ukraine to limit access to online broadcasts from polling stations due to safety concerns.

More than 600 instances of election violations were reported by the independent electoral watchdog Golos, most of which occurred in Moscow.

== Registration ==
On 22 July 2024, election authorities rejected the applications of all 83 members of Yabloko contesting elections for the Municipal Councils of Saint Petersburg.
