= 2024 Karachay-Cherkessia People's Assembly election =

Regional election in Russia

- 6–8 September 2024

All 50 seats in the People's Assembly 26 seats needed for a majority
- Turnout: 68.07% ▼1.00 pp
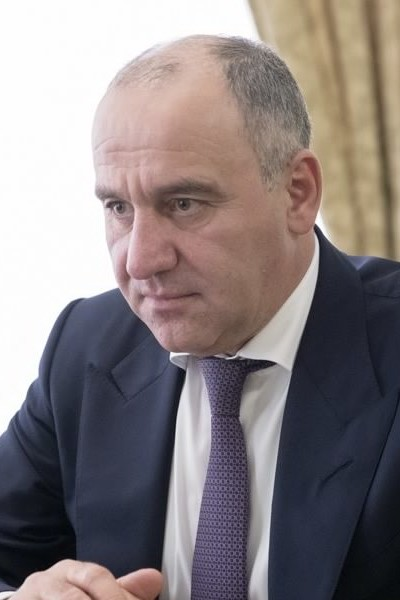

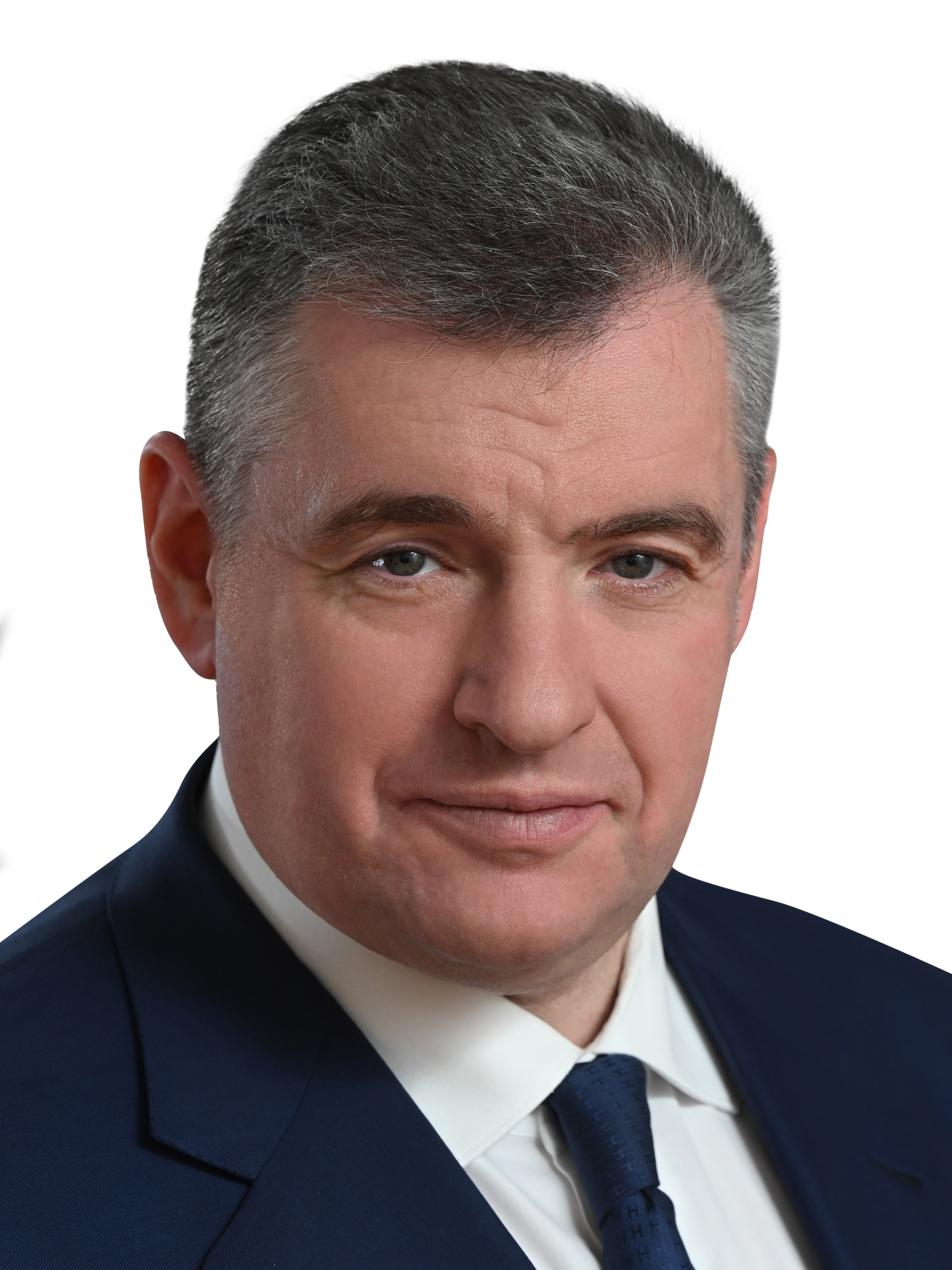

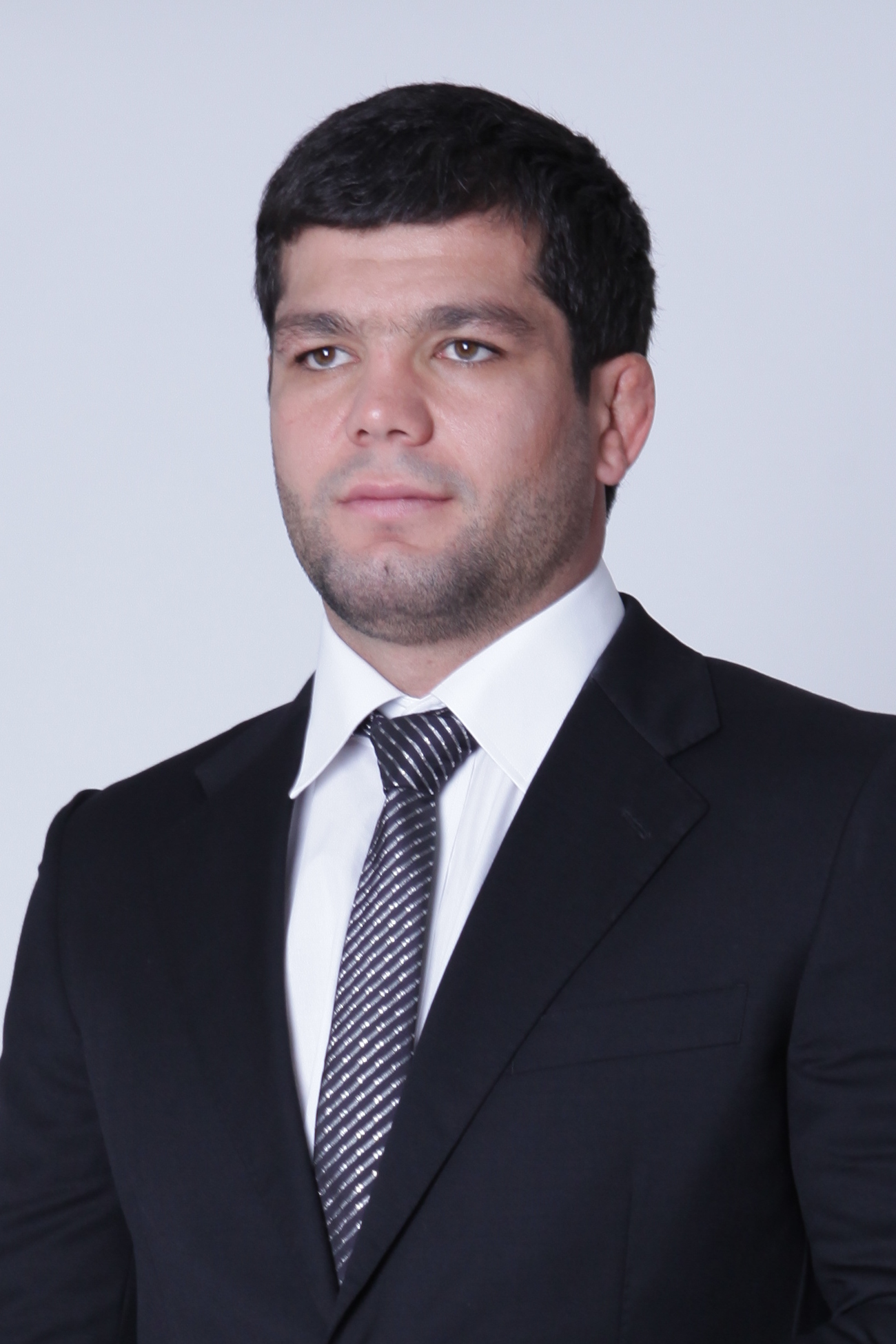
	Majority party	Minority party	Third party
		CPRF	SR-ZP
Candidate	Rashid Temrezov	Kemal Bytdayev	Rasul Salpagarov
Party	United Russia	CPRF	SR-ZP
Last election	65.04%, 34 seats	12.17%, 6 seats	6.19%, 3 seats
Seats won	34	6	6
Seat change	Steady	Steady	▲3
Popular vote	132,408	25,890	23,983
Percentage	65.14%	12.74%	11.80%
Swing	▼0.10 pp	▲0.57 pp	▲5.61 pp
	Fourth party	Fifth party
Candidate	Leonid Slutsky	Novruz Temrezov
Party	LDPR	Civic Platform
Last election	5.04%, 2 seats	5.13%, 2 seats
Seats won	2	2
Seat change	Steady	Steady
Popular vote	10,391	10,268
Percentage	5.11%	5.05%
Swing	▲0.07 pp	▼0.08 pp
Chairman before election
Aleksandr Ivanov
United Russia
Elected Chairman
Aleksandr Ivanov
United Russia

The 2024 People's Assembly of the Karachay-Cherkess Republic election took place on 6–8 September 2024, on common election day. All 50 seats in the People's Assembly were up for reelection.

The composition of the Parliament was completely unchanged with United Russia retaining its overwhelming majority. All the parties crossed the threshold with the most noticeable change being A Just Russia – For Truth doubling its seats, which was resulted by A Just Russia merging with Patriots of Russia party in 2021.

== Electoral system ==
Under current election laws, the People's Assembly is elected for a term of five years by party-list proportional representation with a 5% electoral threshold. Seats are allocated using the Imperiali quota, modified to ensure that every party list, which passes the threshold, receives at least 1 mandate. Unlike most regional elections in Russia, party lists in Karachay-Cherkessia are not divided between territorial groups.

== Candidates ==
To register regional lists of candidates, parties need to collect 0.5% of signatures of all registered voters in Karachay-Cherkessia.

The following parties were relieved from the necessity to collect signatures:

- United Russia
- Communist Party of the Russian Federation
- A Just Russia — Patriots — For Truth
- Liberal Democratic Party of Russia
- New People
- Civic Platform
- Communists of Russia

№	Party	Party-list leaders	Candidates	Status
1	Liberal Democratic Party	Leonid Slutsky • Aleksandr Chayka • Pavel Mikhaylov • Kazbek Badov • Albert Apsov	62	Registered
2	A Just Russia – For Truth	Rasul Salpagarov • Krym Shnakhov • Inessa Reznikova • Ali Kochkarov • Aleksandr Arapov	69	Registered
3	Civic Platform	Novruz Temrezov • Artyom Trifonov • Kazbek Khapayev • ~~Aleksandr Popov~~ • Asiyat Salpagarova	55	Registered
4	United Russia	Rashid Temrezov • Aleksandr Ivanov • Ali Khapsirokov • Mussa Ekzekov • Vladimir Umalatov	70	Registered
5	Communist Party	Kemal Bytdayev • Daniel Lafishev • Aleksandr Lesovoy • Zaur Naymanov • Marat Urusov	62	Registered

Patriots of Russia, which entered the Parliament after the 2019 elections with three deputies, merged with A Just Russia in 2021.

== Results ==
Summary of the 6–8 September 2024 People's Assembly of the Karachay-Cherkess Republic election results
Party	Votes	%	±pp	Seats	+/–
United Russia	132,408	65.14	▼0.10	34	Steady
Communist Party	25,890	12.74	▲0.57	6	Steady
A Just Russia — For Truth	23,983	11.80	▲5.61	6	▲3
Liberal Democratic Party	10,391	5.11	▲0.07	2	Steady
Civic Platform	10,268	5.05	▼0.08	2	Steady
Invalid ballots	332	0.16	▼0.34	—	—
Total	203,272	100.00	—	50	Steady
Turnout	203,272	68.07	▼1.00	—	—
Registered voters	298,615	100.00	—	—	—

Aleksandr Ivanov (United Russia) was re-elected as Chairman of the People's Assembly, while incumbent Senator Akhmat Salpagarov (United Russia) was re-appointed to the Federation Council.

=== Members ===
Incumbent deputies are highlighted with bold, elected members who declined to take a seat are marked with ~~strikethrough~~.

Party lists
Member	Party
~~Rashid Temrezov~~	United Russia
Aleksandr Ivanov	United Russia
Ali Khapsirokov	United Russia
Mussa Ekzekov	United Russia
Vladimir Umalatov	United Russia
Akhmat Salpagarov	United Russia
Dagir Smakuyev	United Russia
Khyzyr Chekkuyev	United Russia
Oleg Dergachev	United Russia
Khasan Khubiyev	United Russia
Artur Korkmazov	United Russia
Aleksey Ganshin	United Russia
Ali Aslanov	United Russia
Abidin Meremkulov	United Russia
Ismail Katchiyev	United Russia
Eldar Salpagarov	United Russia
Adam Gochiyayev	United Russia
Tatyana Chernyayeva	United Russia
Aida Urusova	United Russia
Igor Gonov	United Russia
Ilyas Erkenov	United Russia
Yelena Berdnichenko	United Russia
Shamil Karayev	United Russia
Aslan Botashev	United Russia
Madina Batchayeva	United Russia
Zuber Makhov	United Russia
Zamir Gusov	United Russia
Ilyas Tekeyev	United Russia
Muradin Laypanov	United Russia
Fatima Kardanova	United Russia
Yulia Kapalkina	United Russia
Nikolay Muradov	United Russia
Dakhir Mutchayev	United Russia
Veniamin Khubiyev	United Russia
Aleksandr Minasov	United Russia
Kemal Bytdayev	Communist Party
Daniel Lafishev	Communist Party
Aleksandr Lesovoy	Communist Party
Zaur Naymanov	Communist Party
Marat Urusov	Communist Party
Khasan Bayramukov	Communist Party
Rasul Salpagarov	A Just Russia – For Truth
Krym Shnakhov	A Just Russia – For Truth
Inessa Reznikova	A Just Russia – For Truth
Ali Kochkarov	A Just Russia – For Truth
Aleksandr Arapov	A Just Russia – For Truth
Ruslan Kappushev	A Just Russia – For Truth
~~Leonid Slutsky~~	Liberal Democratic Party
Aleksandr Chayka	Liberal Democratic Party
Pavel Mikhaylov	Liberal Democratic Party
Novruz Temrezov	Civic Platform
Artyom Trifonov	Civic Platform

== See also ==
- 2024 Russian elections
