= Governor of Tula Oblast =

Highest-ranking official in Tula Oblast, Russia

- Губернатор Тульской области
- Flag of Tula Oblast

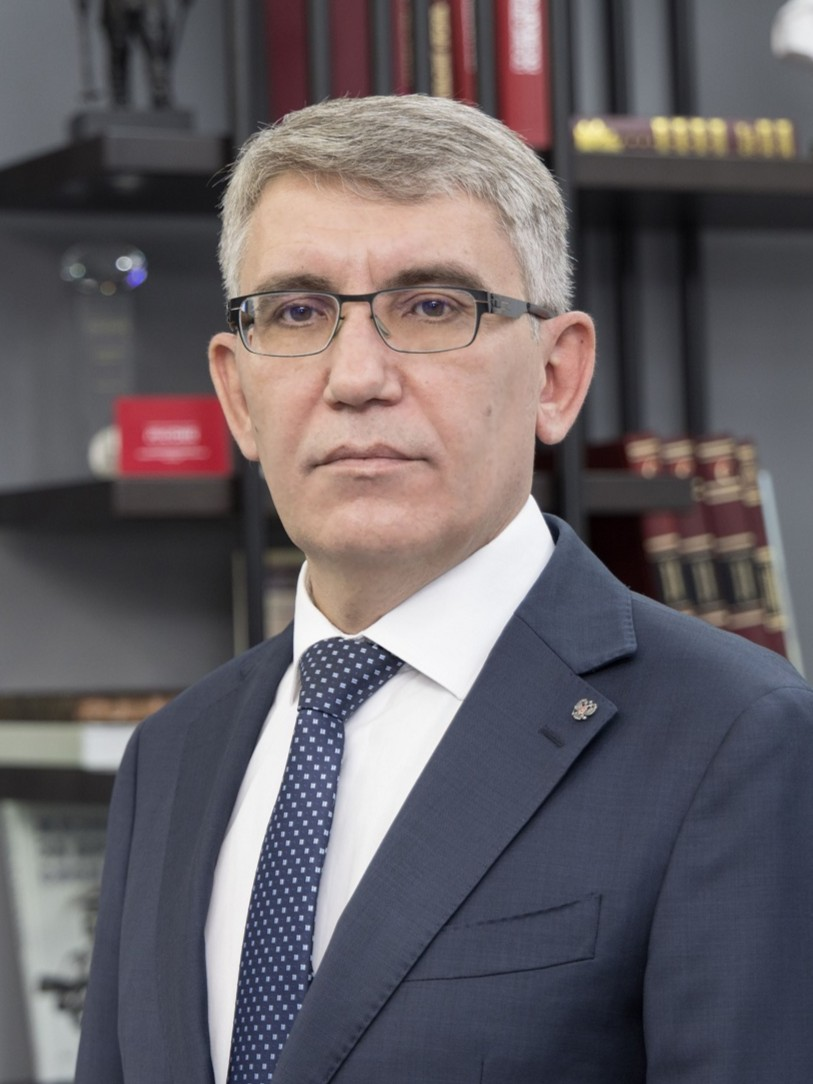
- Incumbent; Dmitry Milyaev since 12 September 2024
- Status: Head of Federal Subject
- Seat: Tula
- Nominator: Political parties or self-nomination
- Appointer: Direct popular vote
- Term length: five years, one consecutive re-election
- Constituting instrument: Charter of Tula Oblast
- Formation: 20 October 1991
- First holder: Nikolai Sevryugin
- Website: www.tularegion.ru

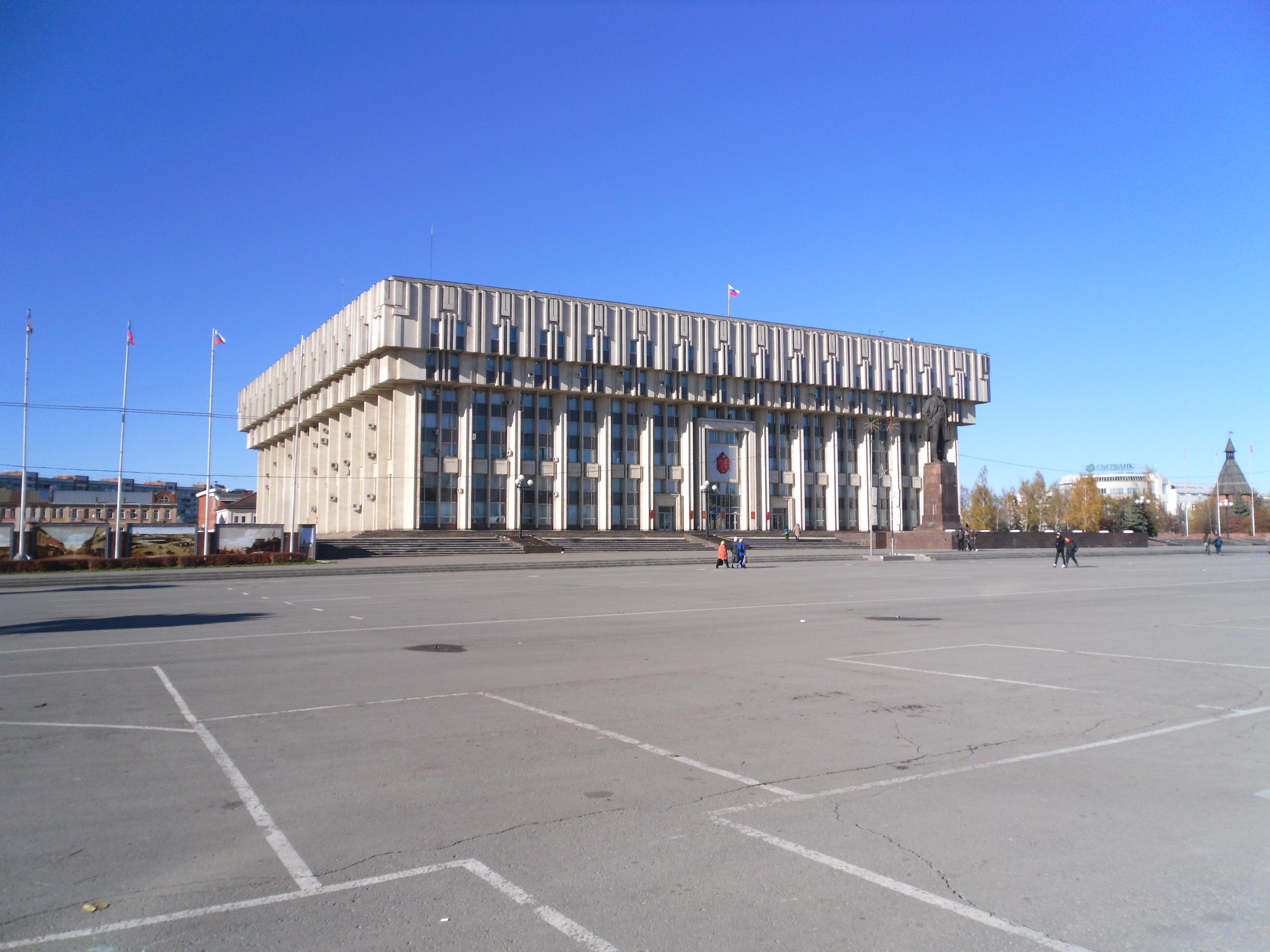
Governor's residence in Tula

The Governor of Tula Oblast is the head of Tula Oblast, the federal subject of Russia. The governor is elected by the people of Tula Oblast for five years.

Dmitry Milyaev is the current governor since 14 May 2024.

== History ==
From 1777 to 1796 the power in the Tula Vicegerency was divided between Governors-General and Vicegerents. The highest political power was exercised by the Governors-General. They had unlimited powers and were subject exclusively to the Russian Monarch. As a rule, each Governor-General directed several regions at the same time. In charge of the Vicegerents was directly economic activities in the field.

In 1797 the Tula Governorate was formed, which was headed by the Governor appointed by the Monarch.

The Tula Oblast was formed on 26 September 1937, initially it was headed by the Chairman of the Tula Governorate Committee of RSDLP(b), then the First Secretary of the Tula Oblast Committee of the CPSU.

In 1991, the post of the Head of the Administration of Tula Oblast was established, who was appointed by the President of Russia. On 28 September 1995, a new Charter of Tula Oblast was adopted, in which the post of Head of the Administration was renamed to Governor, who was elected by the people of the Tula Oblast. At the same time, the powers of the Governor before the elections were carried out by the Head of the Administration Nikolai Sevryugin, who was appointed by the President.

The Governor was elected by direct vote in 1997 and 2001, from 2005 to 2011 the Governor was appointed by the President of Russia with the approval of the Tula Oblast Duma. Since 2016, the Governor again elected by direct vote.

== List ==
Governor		Term Election	Took office	Left office	Party
1	Nikolai Sevryugin (1939–2002)	1 (None)	20 October 1991	31 March 1997	Independent
2	Vasily Starodubtsev (1931–2011)	2 (1997)	31 March 1997	28 April 2001	Agrarian Party
2	Vasily Starodubtsev (1931–2011)	3 (2001)	28 April 2001	29 April 2005	Agrarian Party
3	Vyacheslav Dudka (born 1960)	4 (None)	29 April 2005	29 April 2010	Independent ↓ United Russia
3	Vyacheslav Dudka (born 1960)	5 (None)	29 April 2010	29 July 2011 (Resigned from office)	Independent ↓ United Russia
—	Vladimir Gruzdev (born 1967)	Acting	29 July 2011	18 August 2011	United Russia
4	Vladimir Gruzdev (born 1967)	6 (None)	18 August 2011	2 February 2016 (Resigned from office)	United Russia
—	Alexey Dyumin (born 1972)	Acting	2 February 2016	22 September 2016	Independent
5	Alexey Dyumin (born 1972)	7 (2016)	22 September 2016	22 September 2021	Independent
5	Alexey Dyumin (born 1972)	8 (2021)	22 September 2021	14 May 2024 (Resigned from office)	Independent
—	Dmitry Milyaev (born 1975)	Acting	14 May 2024	12 September 2024	United Russia
6	Dmitry Milyaev (born 1975)	9 (2024)	12 September 2024	Incumbent	United Russia
