= Mikhail Borshchyov =

- Михаил Борщёв
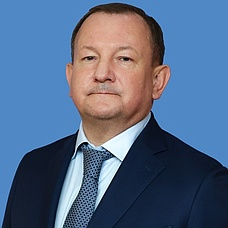

Senator from Tula Oblast
- Incumbent
- Assumed office 7 October 2024
- Preceded by: Marina Levina

Personal details
- Born: 27 February 1968 (age 58) Karasuk, RSFSR, Soviet Union
- Party: United Russia
- Education: Military Institute of Railway Troops and Military Transport; Altai State University

Mikhail Mikhailovich Borshchyov (Russian: Михаил Михайлович Борщёв; born February 27, 1968, in Karasuk, Novosibirsk Oblast) is a Russian politician and a senator of the Federation Council since October 7, 2024. He is a member of the Federation Council Committee on Economic Policy. He is a member of United Russia party.

He graduated from the Leningrad Frunze Higher Military School of Railway Troops and Military Transport in 1990 and from Altai State University with a degree in economics and management.

He holds a PhD in economics (1999). His dissertation topic is "Innovative Processes in Commercial Bank Management: A Case Study of the Altai Krai". He graduated from the State Academy for Advanced Training and Retraining of Personnel for Construction and Housing and Utilities Sector of the Russian Federation.

He has worked at Altai-Credit LLC since 1992.

He has served as Manager of the Barnaul branch of AltaiBusinessBank since 1993.

In 2002, Borshchev survived an assassination attempt. The explosion occurred on July 31 as he was getting ready for work and opening the front door of his apartment in building No. 2 on Petrovskaya Embankment. According to preliminary reports, the explosive device was tripwire-mounted and filled with metal pellets. Experts estimate the explosive device's power to be no more than 60–70 grams of TNT equivalent. This is likely what saved Mr. Borshchev's life. As a result of the explosion, he sustained several shrapnel wounds, primarily to his right shoulder and head. Investigators suspected the crime was a contract killing.

Since March 2005, he has served as General Director of Centergaz, a Gazprom subsidiary based in Tula.

He is laureate of the Russian Federation Government Prize in Science and Technology.
