= Konstantin Surikov =

Russian politician

- Константин Суриков

Prime Minister of the Republic of Ingushetia
- In office 9 September 2019 – 27 January 2020
- Preceded by: Zyalimkhan Yevloyev
- Succeeded by: Vladimir Slastyonin

Personal details
- Born: Konstantin Yuryevich Surikov Soviet Union

Konstantin Yuryevich Surikov (Russian: Константин Юрьевич Суриков), is a Russian politician who served as the Prime Minister of the Republic of Ingushetia. He was 48 at the time.

== Biography ==
Surikov is a graduate of Tomsk State University and a candidate of economic sciences. He also studied at the Academy of National Economy under the President of Russia and Samara State University of Economics.

He worked as an adviser to the chairman of the board of LLC CB Soyuzny and LLC CB Stolichny Credit.

He has held various positions in the bodies of the Central Bank of Russia, such as Branch Manager for the Samara Region of the Volga-Vyatka State Department of the Bank of Russia. In 2014, he was the Head of the Central Bank of Russia Department for the Samara Oblast.

From 2018 to 2019, he was an Assistant Advisor to the Head of Ingushetia.

On 9 September 2019, Surikov became the Prime Minister of the Republic of Ingushetia. He was 48 at the time. He was dismissed on 27 January 2020 for unknown reasons and was replaced by Vladimir Slastyonin.

Since January 2020, he became an Advisor to the Head of Ingushetia on investment policy at the Permanent Mission of the Republic of Ingushetia in Moscow.

== Family ==
He is married and has two children.
