= Mussa Ekzekov =

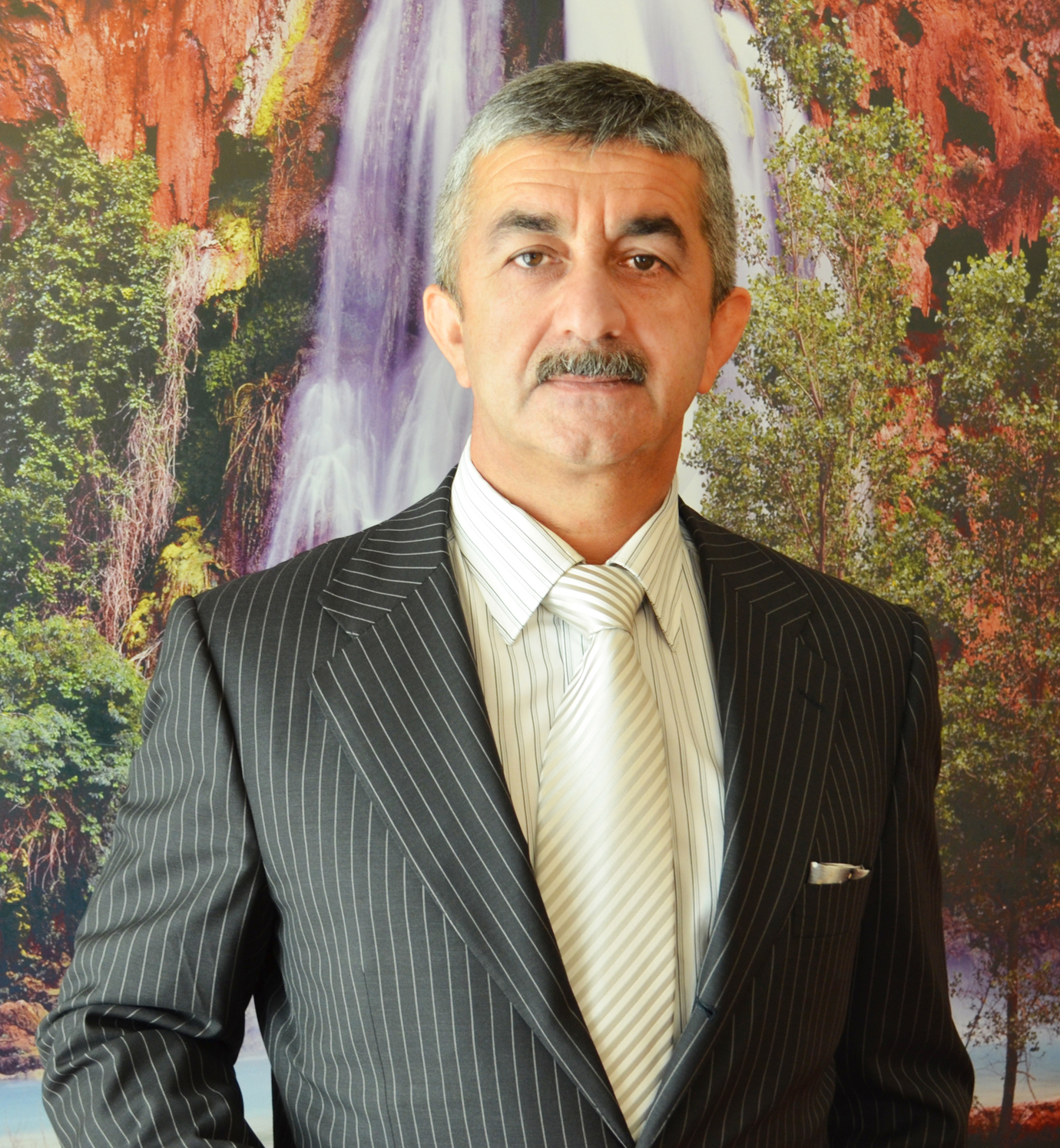
- Born: August 13, 1964 (age 61); Karachay-Cherkessia, Soviet Union
- Citizenship: Russia
- Occupation: Businessperson

Mussa Khabalevich Ekzekov (Russian: Мусса́ Хаба́левич Экзе́ков; born August 13, 1964) is a Soviet and Russian scientist, businessperson, philanthropist and social activist.

== Biography ==
Mussa Ekzekov descends from Abazine ethnic group of the Northwest Caucasus. His stem Egzak was known as early as in the 19th century and belonged to upper highland classes of Kuban district of the Russian Empire.

After finishing at the Leningrad Institute of Technology, Mussa Ekzekov worked as a chief technologist at the factory producing glass laboratory equipment located in village Druzhnaya Gorka, Leningrad Oblast. He also passed PhD dissertation defense on synthesis problems of new composite materials.

In 1998, Mussa Ekzekov established the real estate development company "Solomon" which dealt with commercial property. Since 2000-s his company has undertaken development of the territory with the incomplete construction of the weaving mill "Iskra" in Saint Petersburg. The 30-hectare territory was gradually reclaimed and during 2006 the company opened a new shopping and entertainment center, fitness and business centers, a children's theatre and complex, an ice rink, and a furniture store. By 2007, the company has reclaimed about 200.000 m2 of the territory. The shopping and entertainment center "Grand Canyon" was in the list of 100 best shopping and entertainment centers in Russia. Theatre festivals and other significant cultural events of St. Petersburg are held in this shopping center.

In 2016, Mussa Ekzekov bought up the debts of owners of two largest vegetable warehouses in Saint Petersburg and Leningrad district and took them under his control. The total area of these territories is 95.000 m2.

== Social and charitable activity ==
In 2011, Mussa Ekzekov became a president of the International Association for Assistance to the Abaza-Abkhazian ethnos "Alashara". He initiated a longterm development programme for the ethnos, including the establishment of public councils. The first such council was established in the village Krasnyi Vostok in Karachay-Cherkessia. Over the past years Mussa did a lot for his compatriots including repair and construction of new houses, purchase of equipment for hospitals, assistance to young professionals and promotion of talented people. This activity was highly estimated by Rashid Temrezov, the head of the Karachay-Cherkess Republic. The construction of an ethno-cultural park around the healing mineral spring in village Krasnyi Vostok is another remarkable action of Mussa Ekzekov. The building of the modern sport palace "Alashara" was also started.

The songbook by Galina Gozheva "My soul is warmed with music" with some abazine folk tunes was published with assistance from Mussa Ekzekov. He also supported the publishing of two books devoted dedicated to the 70th anniversary of the victory in the Great Patriotic War with the description of heroic deeds of abazines and lists of abazine veterans. Another contribution of his was publishing of the first reading-book "Abazine children's literature" in Karachay-Cherkessia.

An international conference on problems of studying, maintenance and development of languages and literatures of the Karachay-Cherkess Republic is held under the authority of the "Alashara" Association and Karachay-Caucassian State University.

Mussa Ekzekov does charitable work not only in the Karachay-Cherkess Republic but also in Abkhazia. In June 2015 money for home purchase in Gagra and Pitsunda was allocated for 5 families with veterans of the Eastern Front.

Ekzekov is a founder of the children's sport academy "Leader" in St. Petersburg. There are more than 15 sport sections and a few children creative teams working there. The pupils of the academy participate in the largest Russian and international competitions. An international freestyle-wrestling tournament is called after Mussa Ekzekov.

A monument to Dmitri Shostakovich was unveiled in 2009 with assistance and at the discretion of M. Ekzekov.

== Awards and titles ==
In 2004, Mussa Ekzekov became a professor emeritus of the Saint Petersburg State Institute of Technology.

A full member of the International academy of real economics and the International Academy of Ecology and Life Protection Science. He also was awarded with the gold medal of M. Lomonosov in the latter academy.

On August 12, 2014 M. Ekzekov was awarded with the order of the second degree "Honor and glory" for humanitarian help and merits for development of sport activities in the Republic of Abkhazia.

== Bibliography ==
Mussa Ekzekov wrote more than 30 academic papers including monographs and textbooks that were published in other countries. He is also an author of ethnographical and historical books:

- Mussa Ekzekov. Adherence to the choice. // Journal “Rodina”, 2011, No 6. P.89–91 ISSN 0235-7089 – on the ethnical peculiarity of abazines.
- The traveler's book. The Northern Caucasus and Transcaucasia. In the country of Abaze. St. Peterburg, 2011. ISBN 978-5-4237-0333-2. Co-authored by Russian orientalist N. Emelyanova. (As a matter of fact, it is an encyclopaedia about history, philosophy, culture and customs of the ancient abazine ethnos).
- On both sides of the Greater Caucasian Mountains. Vol.1–2. St. Petersburg, 2012. ISBN 978-5-459-01219-4, 978-5-459-01091-6. (The 2-volume collection includes military reports, governmental acts, and also documents of the Ministry of Foreign Affairs and some other government departments that framed the policy of Russia in the Caucasian region).
