= Tula State University =

Largest state university in Tula, Central Russia

- Тульский государственный университет
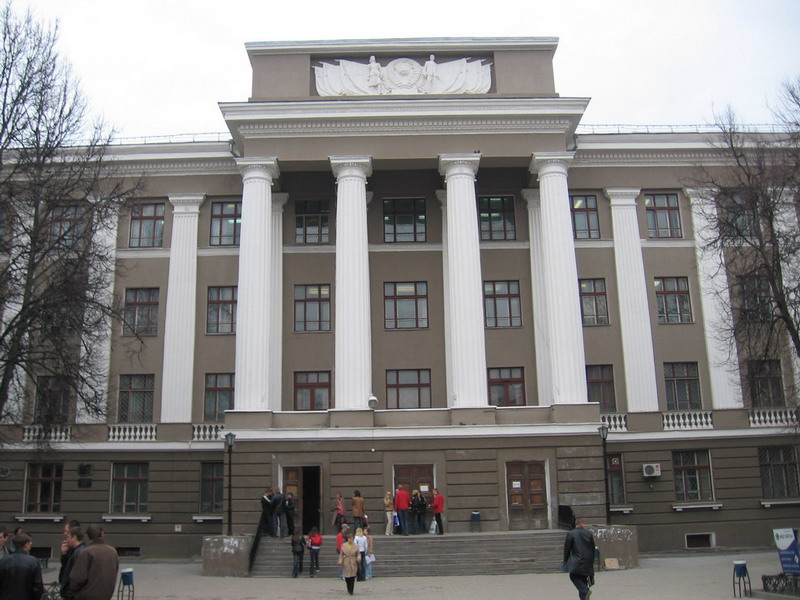
- Motto: Из класса — в высший класс! (From a class to the highest class!)
- Established: 1930
- Rector: Mikhail Gryazev
- Students: 20,000
- Location: Tula, Tula Oblast, Russia; 54°10′01″N 37°35′11″E

University rankings

Regional – Overall
- QS Emerging Europe and Central Asia: 401-450 (2022)

Tula State University (TSU) (Russian: Ту́льский госуда́рственный университе́т, ТулГУ) is the largest state university in Tula, Central Russia. Since May 2006, its rector is Mikhail Gryazev, professor, doctor of technical sciences. More than 20,000 students, 400 post graduates, and 600 foreign students study at Tula State University. The university consists of nine faculties (colleges), a medical institute, a center of pre-university studies, a regional center for professional development, and 73 departments (chairs).

== Educational process ==
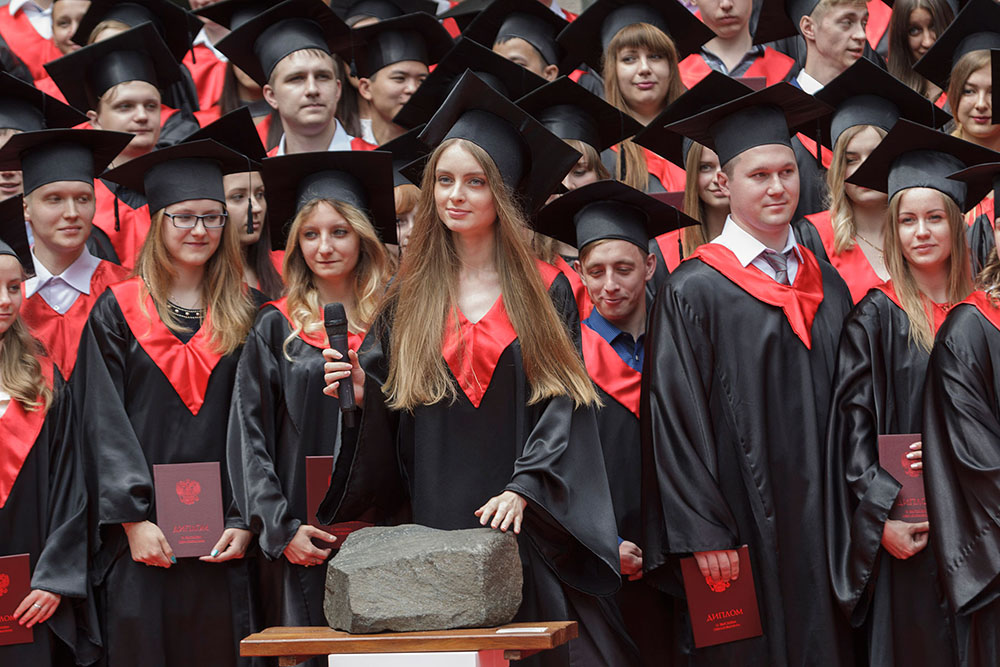
Master's Graduation Ceremony in Tula State University in 2017

TSU has more than 150 study programs in defense, technology, mining construction, computer science, economics, law, humanities and medicine. There are more than 1,200 faculty members. The total number of university staff is 2,400. The Regional Center for Professional Development and Retraining of Administrative Workers and Specialists at Tula State University has more than 2,400 students.

In 2007 TSU received the RF Government Award for Education. The university staff headed by rector Mikhail Gryazev received a State Award for the project called Regional University Educational and Pedagogical Complex of Innovative Educational Technologies Used in Training Specialists for High-technological Production in Defense Industry. Alexander Agubechirovich Khadartsev, the director of the Medical Institute, received a State Award for the scientific research called The Use of Neuron Network Technologies in Educational Process.

== Scientific work ==
The university scientific work includes:

- research supported through grants,
- research carried out in accordance with the economic contracts,
- preparation of specialists of higher qualification (post graduate studies),
- cooperation with institutes and scientific centers of the Russian Academy of Sciences,
- patent and license activity,
- participation in conferences and exhibitions,
- organization of students’ scientific work,
- publication of monographs and other scientific publications.

== International activity ==
The university has scientific and educational connections with universities and colleges of more than 20 countries, including the United States, Great Britain, Germany, Hungary, Czech Republic, People's Republic of China, Taiwan, Poland.

== Sports ==
The Students’ Olympics is held annually at the university.

== Faculty ==
The nine faculties are:

- Faculty of Mechanics and Control Systems
- Faculty of Cybernetics
- Faculty of Mining Construction
- Technological Faculty
- Faculty of Science
- Faculty of Mechanics and Mathematics
- Faculty of Economics and Law
- Faculty of the Humanities
