= Dmitry Milyaev =

Russian politician (born 1975)

Dmity Milyaev
- Дмитрий Миляев
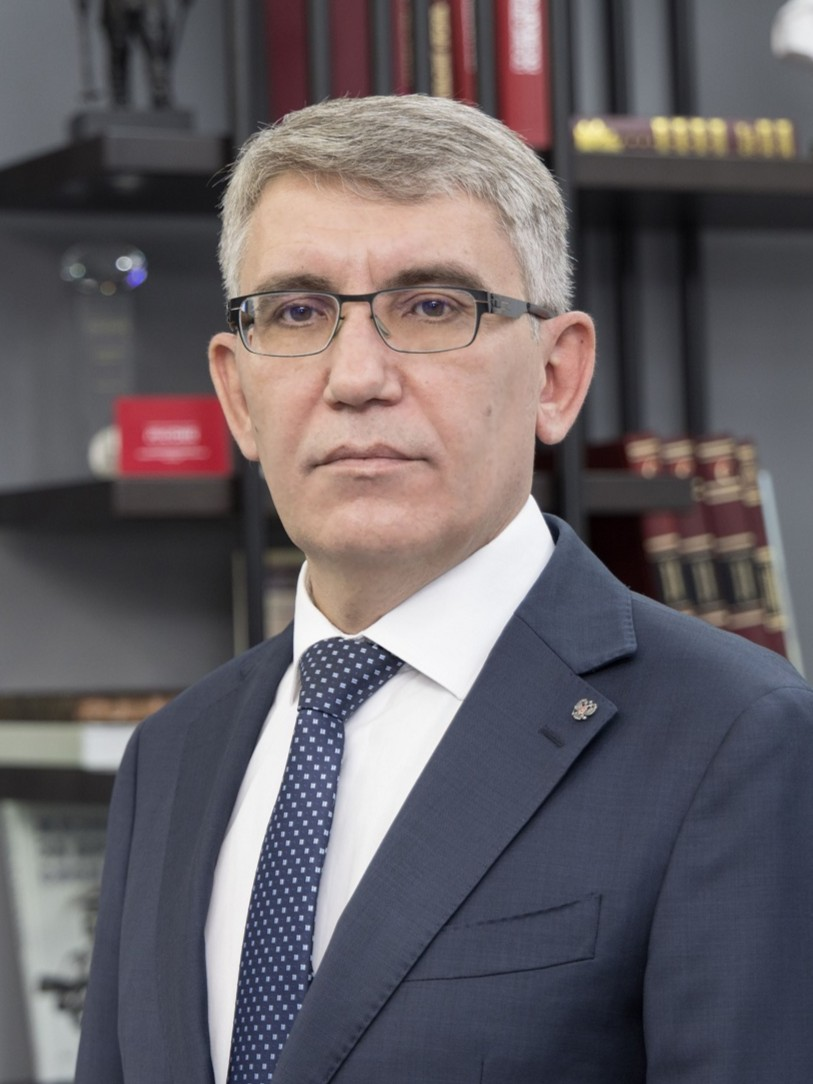
- Official portrait, 2024

Governor of Tula Oblast
- Incumbent
- Assumed office 12 September 2024; Acting: 14 May 2024 – 12 September 2024
- Preceded by: Aleksey Dyumin

Personal details
- Born: 29 August 1975 (age 51) Kireyevsk, Tula Oblast, Russian Soviet Federative Socialist Republic, Soviet Union
- Party: United Russia
- Education: Tula State Pedagogical University
- Awards: Order of Friendship

Dmity Vyacheslavovich Milyaev (Russian: Дмитрий Вячеславович Миляев; born 29 August 1975) is a Russian statesman and politician. He is the current Governor of Tula Oblast since September 12, 2024.

== Biography ==
Dmitry Milyaev was born in Kireyevsk, Tula Oblast. In 1997, he graduated from the Tula State Pedagogical University. In 2003, he received a law degree from the Sholokhov Moscow State University for Humanities.

From 2000 to 2010, Milyaev served as a local adviser and, later, as a leading legal advisor for legal issues and personnel management, and general director of OJSC Tula Bread Products Plant. From 2010 to 2011, he was the general director of Shirinsky Bakery Plant LLC. In 2011, he was appointed Deputy Minister-Director of the Department of State Policy in the Field of Agro-Industrial Complex and Rural Development of the Ministry of Agriculture of the Tula Region. From August 2014 to September 2016, he served as Minister of Agriculture of the Tula Oblast. From September 2016 to September 2019, he was the Deputy Chairman of the Government of the Tula Region.

From October 2019 to October 2022, Milyaev was the head of the administration of the Tula Municipality.

In November 2022, he became the first deputy governor of the Tula Oblast.

On 14 May 2024, Vladimir Putin appointed him as acting governor of the Tula Oblast after Aleksey Dyumin moved on to serve as Secretary of the State Council.
