= Tula Oblast Duma =

Regional parliament of Tula Oblast, Russia

Tula Oblast Duma Тульская областная дума
- 8th legislature
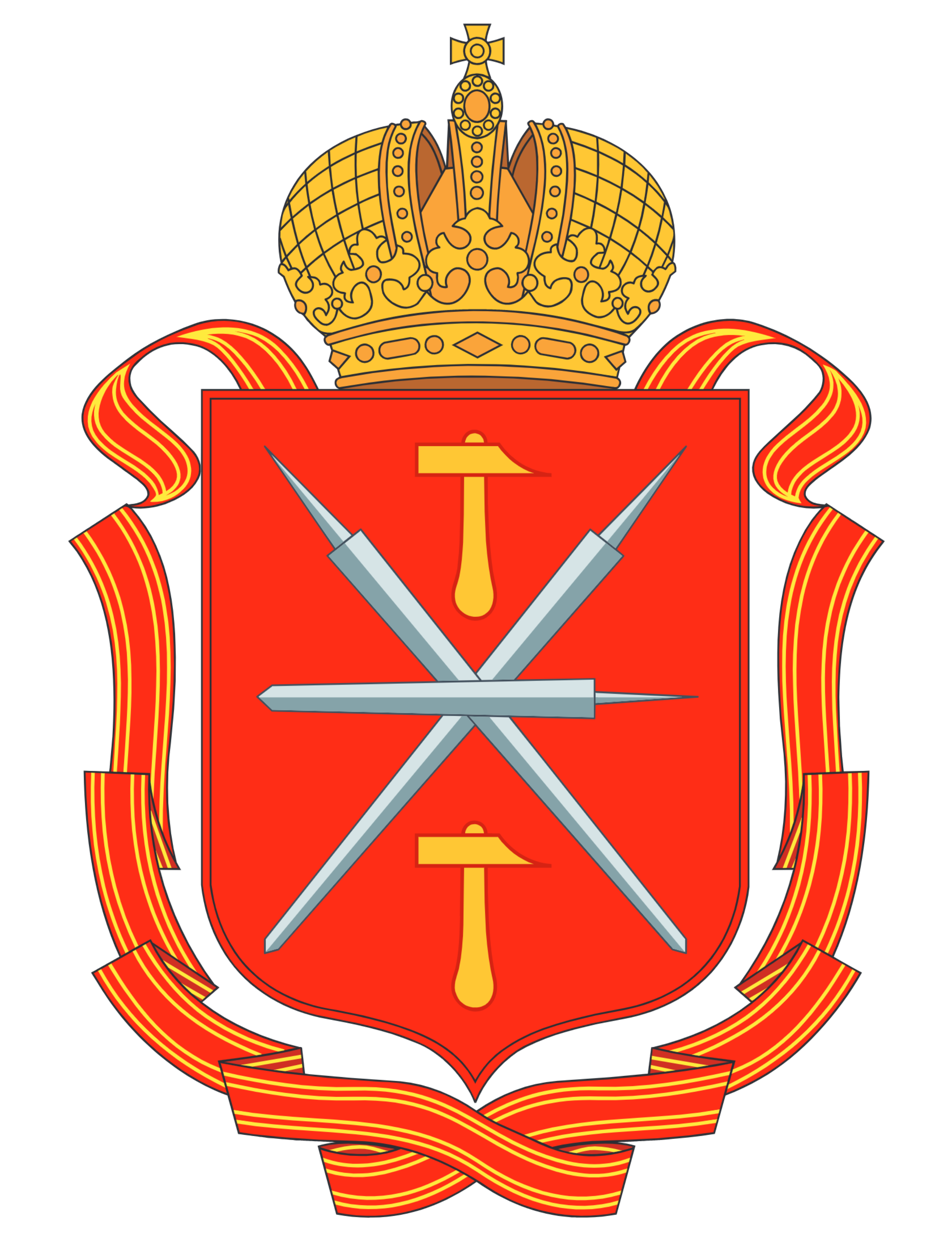

Type
- Type: Unicameral

Leadership
- Chairman: Nikolay Vorobyev, United Russia since 17 December 2020

Structure
- Seats: 36
- Political groups: United Russia (29) CPRF (2); SRZP (2); CPCR (1); LDPR (2)

Elections
- Voting system: Mixed
- Last election: 6-8 September 2024
- Next election: 2029

Meeting place
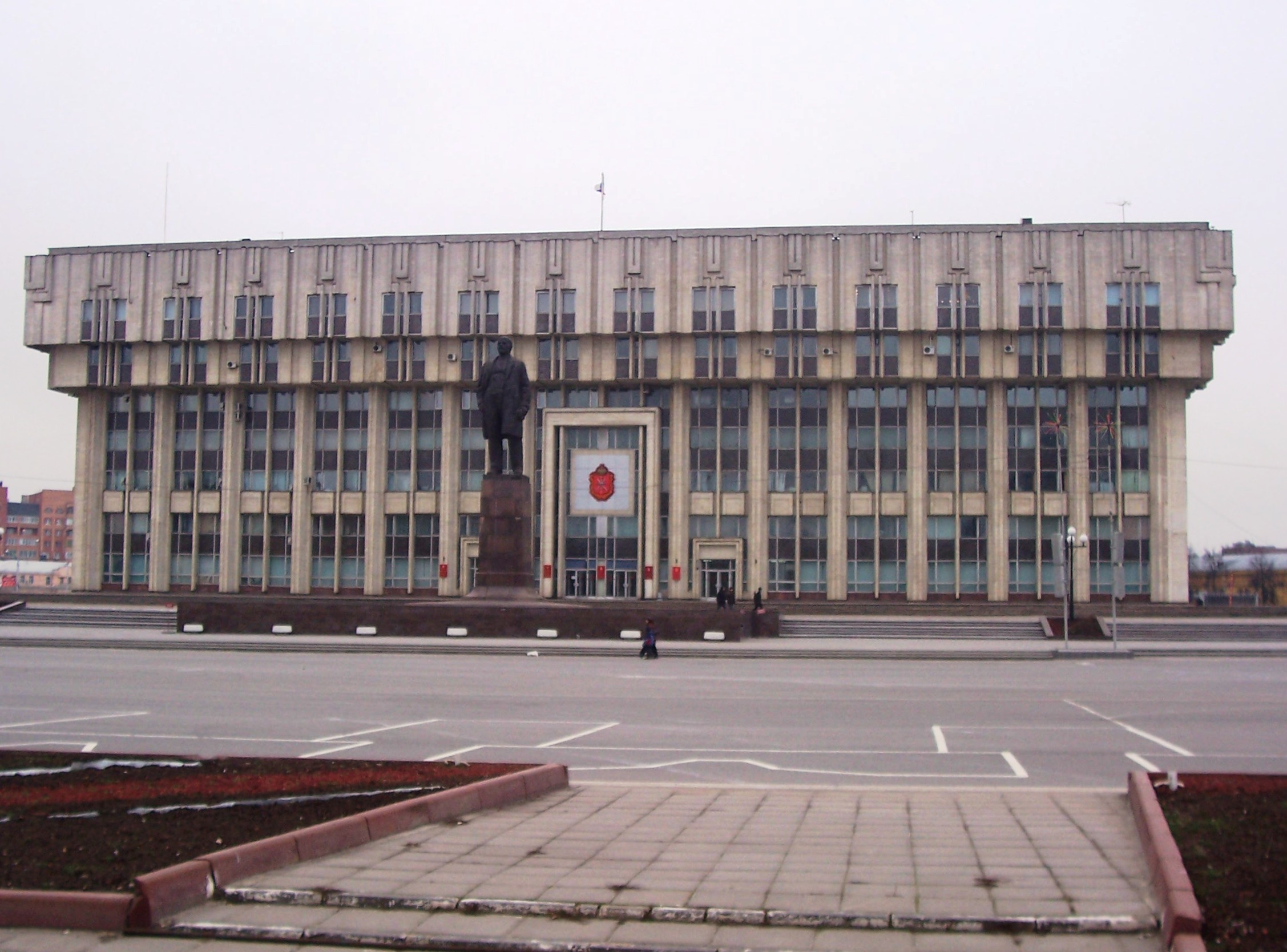
- 2 Lenin Square, Tula

Website
- tulaoblduma.ru

The Tula Oblast Duma (Russian: Тульская областная дума, romanized: Tul'skaya oblastnaya duma) is the regional parliament of Tula Oblast, a federal subject of Russia. A total of 36 deputies are elected for five-year terms.

== Elections ==
=== 2019 ===
Party	%	Seats
United Russia	50.27	27
Communist Party of the Russian Federation	14.49	2
Liberal Democratic Party of Russia	10.39	2
A Just Russia	7.09	2
Russian Party of Pensioners for Social Justice	5.93	1
Communists of Russia	5.67	1
Registered voters/turnout	31.87	

=== 2024 ===
Party	%	Seats
United Russia	58.71	29
Communist Party of the Russian Federation	13.20	2
Liberal Democratic Party of Russia	9.74	2
A Just Russia	7.57	2
Communists of Russia		1
Russian Party of Pensioners for Social Justice	4.45	0
New People	4.16	0
Invalid ballots	2.17	
Registered voters/turnout	49.47	
