= 2021 Tula Oblast gubernatorial election =

- 17–19 September 2021
- Turnout: 52.69%
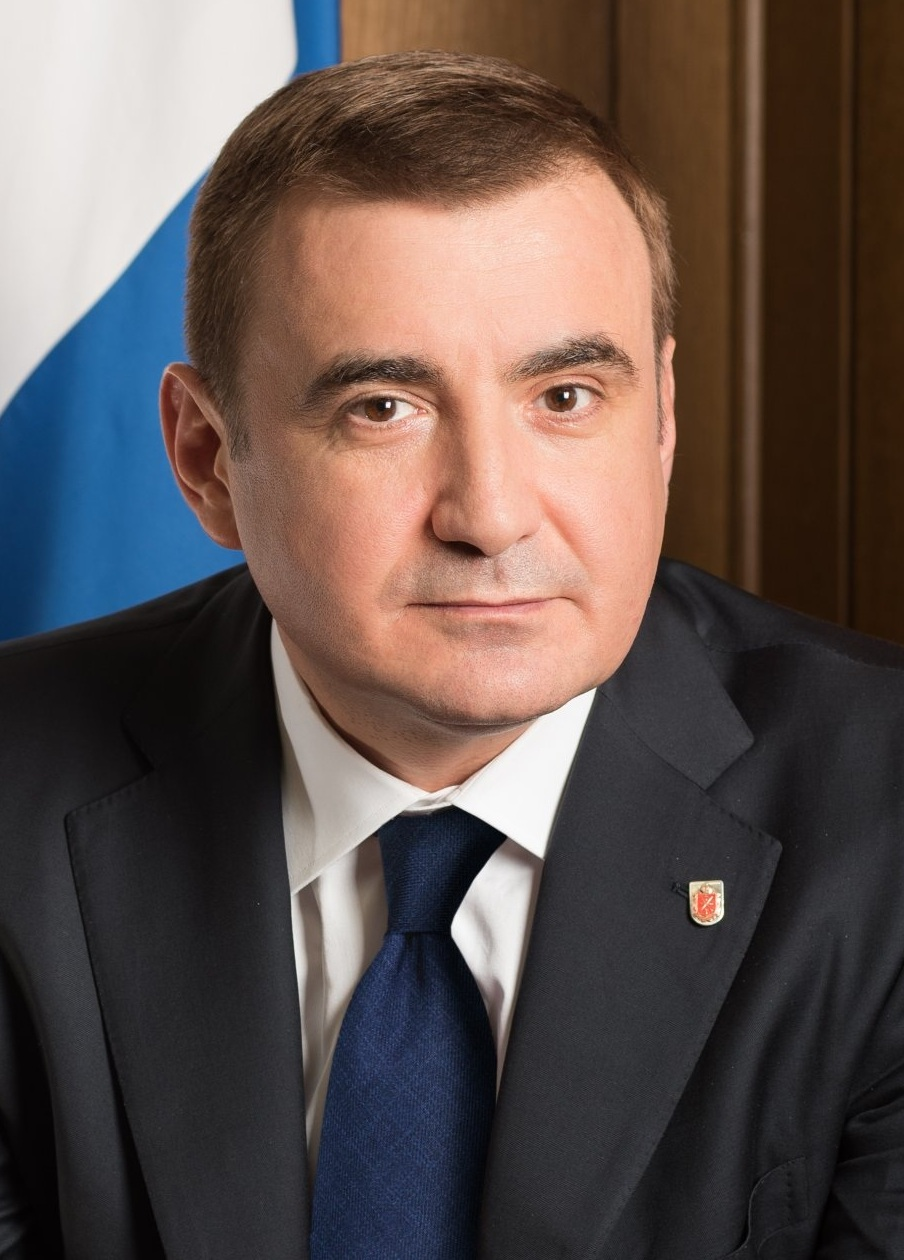
| | | CPRF |
| Candidate | Aleksey Dyumin | Vladimir Isakov |
| Party | Independent | CPRF |
| Popular vote | 506,816 | 54,371 |
| Percentage | 83.58% | 8.97% |
Governor before election
Aleksey Dyumin
Independent
Elected Governor
Aleksey Dyumin
Independent

The 2021 Tula Oblast gubernatorial election took place on 17–19 September 2021, on common election day, coinciding with election to the State Duma. Incumbent governor Aleksey Dyumin was re-elected for his second term.

== Background ==
Aleksey Dyumin in February 2016 replaced Vladimir Gruzdev as Governor of Tula Oblast, before the appointment Dyumin served as Deputy Minister of Defense (2015–2016) and Vladimir Putin's adjutant. Dyumin ran as an independent with the support from United Russia and LDPR and won 2016 election with 84.17% of the vote. Dyumin became the first of "Putin's adjutants" - a group of Russian governors appointed in 2016-2018 who previously served in Federal Protective Service for President Putin, besides Dyumin, this group consists of Yaroslavl Oblast Governor Dmitry Mironov, former acting Kaliningrad Oblast Governor Yevgeny Zinichev (2016) and former acting Astrakhan Oblast Governor Sergey Morozov (2018–2019).

For much of Dyumin's term speculations floated that Dyumin would return to Moscow to head a federal armed service. Governor Aleksey Dyumin is also considered a possible Vladimir Putin's successor as President of Russia. However, Dyumin decided to run for the second term as governor.

== Candidates ==
In Tula Oblast candidates for Governor can be nominated by registered political parties or by self-nomination. Candidate for Governor of Tula Oblast should be a Russian citizen and at least 30 years old. Candidates for Governor should not have a foreign citizenship or residence permit. Each candidate in order to be registered is required to collect at least 7% of signatures of members and heads of municipalities (71-74 signatures). In addition self-nominated candidates should collect 2% of signatures of Tula Oblast residents (23,4 thousand signatures). Also gubernatorial candidates present 3 candidacies to the Federation Council and election winner later appoints one of the presented candidates.

Incumbent governor Aleksey Dyumin for the second time decided to run as an Independent and received support from United Russia. LDPR and SR-ZP declined to nominate a candidate.

=== Registered candidates ===
- Aleksey Dyumin (Independent), incumbent Governor of Tula Oblast
- Vladimir Isakov (CPRF), Member of Tula City Duma, aide to State Duma member Yury Afonin
- Yury Moiseev (Communists of Russia), Member of Tula Oblast Duma
- Vladimir Rostovtsev (RPPSS), Member of Tula City Duma, chairman of RPPSS regional office

=== Candidates for the Federation Council ===
- Aleksey Dyumin (Independent):
  - Nikolay Vorobyov (United Russia), Speaker of Tula Oblast Duma
  - Dmitry Savelyev (United Russia), incumbent senator of the Federation Council
  - Yekaterina Tolstaya (United Russia), member of Tula Oblast Duma
- Vladimir Isakov (CPRF):
  - Valentina Mishina, former member of Tula Oblast Duma (1996–2000)
  - Viktor Tarasov, member of Novomoskovsk Assembly of Deputies, first secretary of CPRF Novomoskovsk city committee
  - Anatoly Turenko, aide to State Duma member Oleg Lebedev
- Yury Moiseev (Communists of Russia):
  - Irina Chudakova, aide to Yury Moiseev
  - Mikhail Dyatlov, deputy director of LLP "Gasenergomontazh"
  - Denis Ilyukhin, member of Aleksin Assembly of Deputies, aide to Yury Moiseev
- Vladimir Rostovtsev (RPPSS):
  - Vladimir Lvov, pensioner, perennial candidate
  - Nikolay Ogoltsov, pensioner, 2016 gubernatorial candidate
  - Sergey Shelobaev, pro-rector of Institute of Economics and Management

== Results ==
Summary of the 17-19 September 2021 Tula Oblast gubernatorial election results
| Candidate | Party | Votes | % |
|---|---|---|---|
| Aleksey Dyumin (incumbent) | Independent | 506,816 | 83.58 |
| Vladimir Isakov | Communist Party | 54,371 | 8.97 |
| Vladimir Rostovtsev | Party of Pensioners | 18,519 | 3.05 |
| Yury Moiseev | Communists of Russia | 16,810 | 2.77 |
| Valid votes | | 596,516 | 98.37 |
| Blank ballots | | 9,868 | 1.63 |
| Total | | 606,384 | 100.00 |
| Turnout | | 606,384 | 52.69 |
| Registered voters | | 1,150,957 | 100.00 |

Incumbent Senator Dmitry Savelyev (United Russia) was re-appointed to the Federation Council.
