= 2016 Tula Oblast gubernatorial election =

Local election in Russia

- 18 September 2016
- Turnout: 45.5%
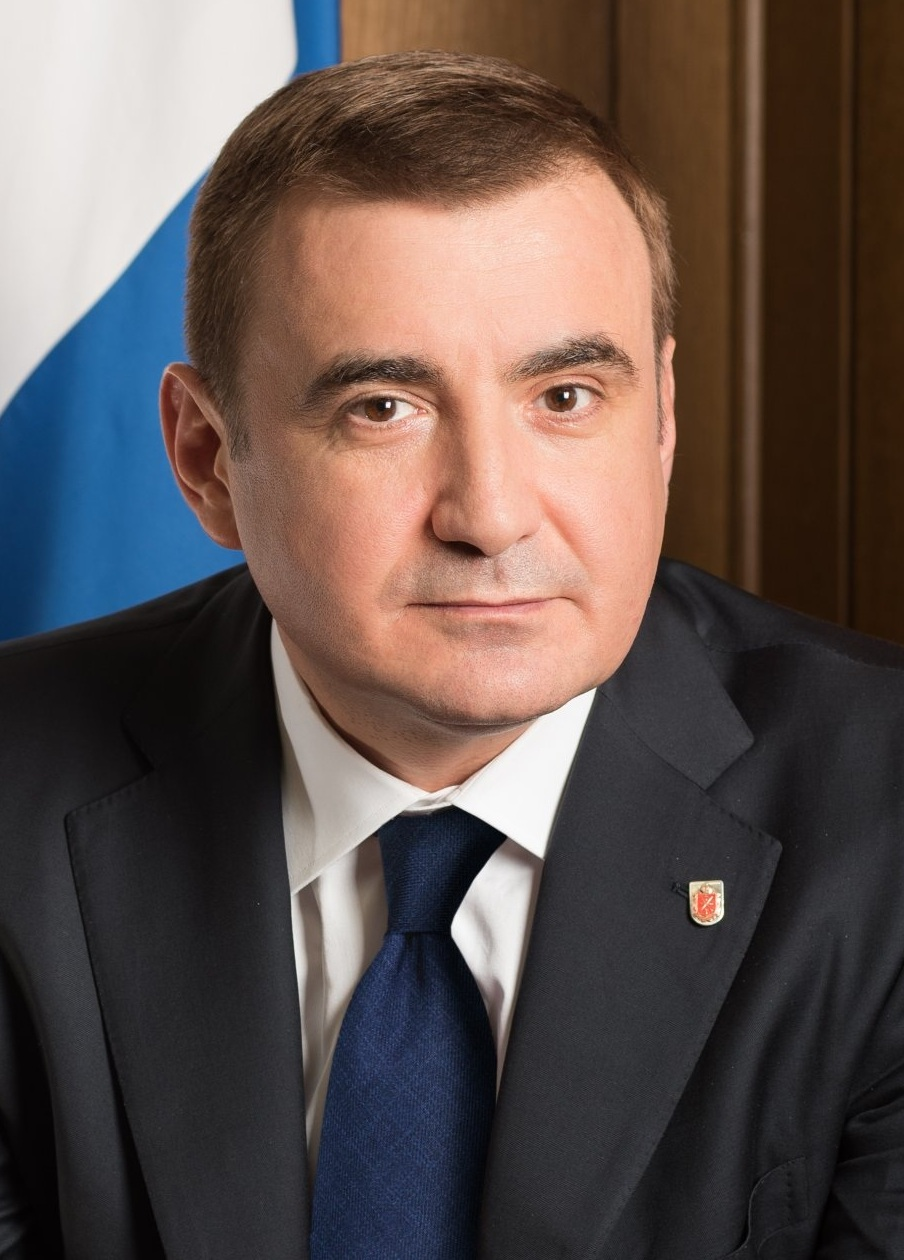

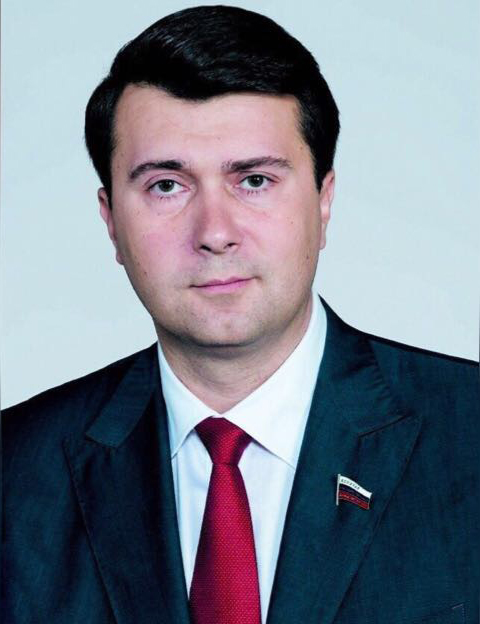
Nominee	Alexey Dyumin	Oleg Lebedev
Party	Independent	CPRF
Popular vote	461,411	41,259
Percentage	84.2%	7.5%
- Municipal results
Acting Governor before election
Alexey Dyumin
Independent
Elected Governor
Alexey Dyumin
Independent

The 2016 Tula Oblast gubernatorial election took place on September 18, 2016, to elect the governor of Tula Oblast. Election took place concurrently with Federal legislative election and local elections in Single Electoral Day.

== Background ==
Until 2012, the governor of Tula Oblast was not elected, but was appointed by the president of Russia, with the approval of the Tula Oblast Duma. Direct elections were introduced in 2012.

In August 2011, Vladimir Gruzdev became governor. His term expired in August 2016 and he could be elected for a second term; however, Gruzdev resigned from office in February 2016, and Alexey Dyumin became the acting governor until election.

== Candidates ==
Candidates could be nominated by political parties or by self-nomination. To participate in the elections, candidates from the parties had to collect signatures of 7% of municipal deputies and heads of municipalities. Independent candidates, in addition to the municipal filter, still had to collect 2% of the signatures of residents of the region (about 25,000 signatures).

The acting governor, Alexey Dyumin, decided to run for governor as independent candidate, but he was supported by United Russia and Liberal Democratic Party. At the same time, Tula Oblast became the only region in 2016 where the United Russia did not hold a primaries for the selection of a candidate for governor from the party.

According to the law, each candidate had to nominate three candidates for Federation Council, one of whom was to be appointed senator in case of the candidate's victory.

A total of four candidates were registered.

Candidate	Party	Office	Nominees to the Federation Council
Oleg Veselov	Communists of Russia	Employee of the branch of Federal State Budgetary Institution "Branch of Cadastral Chamber of Rosreestr" in Tula Oblast	Irina Matyzhenkova; Alexander Pinayev; Vadim Solovyov
Alexey Dyumin	Independent (supported by United Russia and Liberal Democratic Party)	Incumbent Acting Governor	Nikolay Vorobyov; Mikhail Gryazev; Dmitry Savelyev
Oleg Lebedev	Communist Party	Member of the State Duma	Nadejda Gribanova; Andrey Kozelsky; Tatyana Kosaryova
Nikolay Ogoltsov	Party of Pensioners	Chief of department of corporate protection of JSC "Gazprom gazoraspredelenie Tula"	Dmitry Goltyakov; Olesya Kurbatova; Alexander Pustovoy

== Results ==
Alexey Dyumin was elected governor in the first round. After the election, Dyumin appointed Dmitry Savelyev as senator.

Candidate	Party	Votes	%
Alexey Dyumin	Independent	461,411	84.2%
Oleg Lebedev	Communist Party	41,259	7.5%
Oleg Veselov	Communists of Russia	18,673	3.4%
Nikolay Ogoltsov	Party of Pensioners	16,023	2.9%
Valid ballots		537,366	98.0%
Invalid ballots		10,799	2.0%
Total		548,165	100%
Turnout		548,459	45.5%

== See also ==
- 2016 Russian gubernatorial elections
