= 2016 Russian gubernatorial elections =

2016 Russian gubernatorial election
- 18 September 2016

9 Heads of Federal Subjects from 85
- Turnout: 50.1% (Note: Average turnout in the regions where direct elections were held)
	First party	Second party
Party	United Russia	Independent
Seats before	74	8
Seats won	6	3
Seats after	74	8
Popular vote	1,199,591	958,975
Percentage	42.5%	33.9%
Vote in Parliaments	105	0
Percentage	97.2%	0%

Gubernatorial elections were held on 18 September 2016 in nine federal subjects of Russia. All elections passed in one round.

In seven federal subjects, there were direct elections of governors, and in two, the governor was elected by the regional parliaments.

None of the incumbent governors had lost the elections.

== Race summary ==
Federal Subject	Incumbent	Party	Incumbent status	Candidates	Governor-elect
Komi	Sergey Gaplikov	Independent	Acting	✓ Sergey Gaplikov (IND) (Note: Nominated by United Russia) 62.17%; Ivan Filipchenko (LDPR) 10.53%; Leonid Musinov (CPRF) 10.37%; Vyacheslav Popov (SR) 9.93%	Sergey Gaplikov
Tula Oblast	Alexey Dyumin	Independent	Acting	✓ Alexey Dyumin (IND) (Note: Supported by United Russia and Liberal Democratic Party) 84.17%; Oleg Lebedev (CPRF) 7.53%	Alexey Dyumin
Zabaykalsky Krai	Natalia Zhdanova	United Russia	Acting	✓ Natalia Zhdanova (UR) 54.39%; Nikolay Merzlikin (CPRF) 28.74%; Anatoly Vershinsky (APR) 9.76%	Natalia Zhdanova
Tver Oblast	Igor Rudenya	Independent	Acting	✓ Igor Rudenya (IND) 72.10%; Anton Morozov (LDPR) 14.74%; Ilya Kleimenov (CR) 9.71%	Igor Rudenya
Chechnya	Ramzan Kadyrov	United Russia	Term-limited	✓ Ramzan Kadyrov (UR) 97.94%; Idris Usmanov (PG) 0.84%	Ramzan Kadyrov
Ulyanovsk Oblast	Sergey Morozov	United Russia	Term-limited	✓ Sergey Morozov (UR) 54.33%; Alexey Kurinny (CPRF) 25.46%; Sergey Marinin (LDPR) 6.57%; Oleg Goryachev (Yabloko) 5.55%	Sergey Morozov
Tuva	Sholban Kara-ool	United Russia	Term-limited	✓ Sholban Kara-ool (UR) 85.66%; Sergey Salchak (CPRF) 5.00%	Sholban Kara-ool

=== Indirect elections ===
Federal Subject	Incumbent	Party	Incumbent status	Candidates	Governor-elect
North Ossetia–Alania	Vyacheslav Bitarov	United Russia	Acting	✓ Vyacheslav Bitarov (UR) 56/70; Gary Kuchiev (SR) 3/70; Yelena Knyazeva (CPRF) 0/70; Present 2/70	Vyacheslav Bitarov
Karachay-Cherkessia	Rashid Temrezov	United Russia	Term-limited	✓ Rashid Temrezov (UR) 49/50; Ismel Bidjiev (CPRF) 0/50; Viktor Borodavkin (PR) 0/50	Rashid Temrezov

== Results ==
=== Direct elections ===
The total number of votes in seven federal subjects.

Party	Votes	%	Seats	
Party	Votes	%	Won	Total
United Russia	1,199,591	44.11	4	74
Communist Party	168,926	6.21	0	2
Liberal Democratic Party	134,709	4.95	0	1
A Just Russia	80,320	2.95	0	0
Communists of Russia	75,033	2.76	0	0
Agrarian Party	29,694	1.09	0	0
Yabloko	29,256	1.08	0	0
Patriots of Russia	17,269	0.63	0	0
Russian Party of Pensioners for Justice	16,023	0.59	0	0
Party of Growth	5,367	0.20	0	0
The Greens	4,626	0.17	0	0
Independents	958,975	35.26	3	8
Total	2,719,789	100.00	7	85
Valid votes	2,719,789	97.66		
Invalid/blank votes	65,252	2.34		
Total votes	2,785,041	100.00		
Registered voters/turnout	5,635,256	49.42		

=== Vote in Parliament ===
The total number of votes in two federal subjects.

Party	Votes	%	Seats	
Party	Votes	%	Won	Total
United Russia	105	97.22	2	74
A Just Russia	3	2.78	0	0
Communist Party	0	0.00	0	2
Patriots of Russia	0	0.00	0	0
Total	108	100.00	2	76
Registered voters/turnout	120	–		
