= Student Anti-Fascist Front =

Left-wing student organisation in Russia

Student Anti-Fascist Front Студенческий антифашистский фронт
- Abbreviation: SAF
- Chairman: Vladimir Stepanov
- Founded: 11 April 2024 (RSUH students' initiative); 24 July 2024 (SAF)
- Membership (2025): "several hundreds"
- Ideology: Anti-fascism
- Political position: Left-wing; Factions: Centre-left to far-left
- Colours: Black; Red; White
- Slogan: "Students, self-organization, anti-fascism" (Russian: «Студенчество, самоорганизация, антифашизм»)

Website
- Telegram channel

The Student Anti-Fascist Front (SAF; Russian: Студенческий антифашистский фронт, romanized: Studencheskiy antifashistskiy front) is a Russian left-wing student organization founded in April 2024 as an initiative against the establishment of the Ivan Ilyin Higher Political School led by Aleksandr Dugin at the RSUH. After expanding the initiative to other universities and formulating a political platform, the initiative was reformed into Student Anti-Fascist Front in July 2024.

== Ideology ==
The Student Anti-Fascist Front declares its goal to resist the spread of fascist ideology and fight together for the rights and freedoms of students in Russia, as well as against the strengthening of the right-wing movement among young people. SAF declares its desire to unite students from all over the country and is aimed at combating fascism in Russian higher education. The movement claims to become an autonomous student union that truly defends their rights. In contrast to the existing "yellow" (controlled by the authorities and rectors) unions.

SAF positions itself ideologically as a broad front type organization, predominantly left-wing: it includes students of various political orientations: democratic socialist, classical Marxist, anarchist, social democratic, left-wing liberal, "patriotic anti-woke left", Maoist, Trotskyist, Stalinist, and even Jucheist. With its anti-fascist orientation, SAF opposes traditional direct action by Antifa subculture, preferring media activity.

SAF is described as an organization that is far from supporting Russia's military actions in Ukraine, as well as from a pro-Ukrainian position, stating that this is a "confrontation between two imperialisms". According to SAF activist and member of the Moscow Leninist Komsomol leadership Olga Serikova, anti-war sentiments prevail among the majority of leftists in Russia, but they are completely invisible because "any statement, even the most cautious, leads to imprisonment or accusations with terrible personal consequences." The SAF leadership itself prohibits giving any assessment of the Russian-Ukrainian war on behalf of the organization.

== History ==
=== RSUH Ilyin School scandal ===
In 2023, the Russian State University for the Humanities (RSUH or RSUH) appointed far-right philosopher Alexander Dugin as head of the newly formed Ivan Ilyin Higher Political School. The decision sparked opposition from university students, who opposed the far-right views of both Dugin and Ivan Ilyin, after whom the school was named. On 12 April 2024, a petition was posted on Change.org against naming the school after Ilyin, who, according to the students, was a "supporter of fascist ideas," "provided support the activities of the Nazi regime, justified Hitler’s crimes by opposing Bolshevism, and wrote about the need for Russian fascism." In addition to the petition, activists began distributing their stickers at the university. They later reported that the university administration called in several students who had posted the stickers, who had been found using video camera footage, and demanded that they write explanatory statements.

Subsequently, students from dozens of other Russian universities joined the RSUH students’ grassroots initiative. The initiative was described by historian and publicist Ilya Budraitskis as being more connected to the figures of Dugin and Konstantin Malofeev than Ilyin and as a protest against the ideologization of higher education in general. As of 20 June 2024, the petition has collected 31,800 signatures.

The student movement was supported by State Duma deputy from CPRF Denis Parfenov, who stated that neither he nor the students were satisfied with Ilyin's fascist views. Another CPRF deputy, Vladimir Isakov, appealed to the Prosecutor-General Igor Krasnov and the Minister of Science and Higher Education Valery Falkov with a request to check the legality of the actions of the RSUH Academic Council, accusing it of violating criminal legislation on the rehabilitation of Nazism.

RSUH rector Alexander Bezborodov, in turn, called the authors of the petition "Ukrainian agents" and having no connection to the university. Bezborodov said that Ilyin "did not support any fascists or Nazis." Aleksandr Dugin called the petition "an operation by Western intelligence services aimed at discrediting him as a participant in the filing of an appeal regarding the financing of terrorism by officials of the United States and NATO countries." State Duma Chairman Vyacheslav Volodin commented on the scandal, stating that it was wrong to give a political coloring to the disputes around the school, calling Ilyin "a famous Russian philosopher."

On 19 April 2024, a meeting between Rector Bezborodov and students was announced on the channel of the RSUH History Department, but 15 minutes later the announcement of the event was removed, and the meeting itself was switched to a "closed format by appointment". After the meeting with the rector, the initiative representatives reported that "the university administration directly said: we will not be able to achieve the renaming with the help of students alone." One of the public faces of the campaign was Darya Bagina, the first secretary of the Moscow Leninist Komsomol and assistant to the State Duma deputy Denis Parfenov, who called the statements about the "Ukrainian trace" and "Western agents" "disingenuous, since the university’s management officially acknowledged that the stickers were posted by RSUH students."

After attempts to present the initiative as not related to RSUH students, the initiative group published photographs and names of four second-year students who were part of the organizing committee: Stanislav Stozhek, Timofey Lazarev, Egor Mukhin and Vasily Povalyaev.

Although the campaign to close the school effectively failed, RSUH rector Bezborodov resigned in June 2024 following the scandal.

=== SAF establishment ===
On 24 July 2024, the Student Anti-Fascist Front, an all-Russian student movement, was founded on the basis of the initiative "RSUH Students against the Ilyin School". The SAF organizers stated that students from more than 80 Russian universities have joined the anti-fascist initiatives of RSUH students. The structure of the front was created: the organization was divided into cells based on the principle of belonging to a university, city or region, and each cell elected its own deputy to the Council of Representatives. Artyom Voznesensky was elected as the first Chairman of the Council of Representatives of the SAF.

On 29 December 2024, a SAF meeting was held in Moscow, chaired by the organization's chairman Vladimir Stepanov. The meeting was attended by representatives of SAF cells, the Russian Communist Party (Internationalists), Komsomol, the CPRF, and the Left Front. In addition to ideological issues, the meeting discussed the problems faced by students at Russian universities: a shortage of classrooms and dormitories, chaotic schedules, and low stipends.

After the news coverage of Ilyin's School died down, SAF experienced a certain decline in activity and an outflow of members, combined with organizational problems. As of March 2025, the number of activists of the organization is estimated at several hundred people. Some students in interviews also say that there are applicants who choose a university based on the presence of a SAF cell in it.

== Criticism ==
Student newspaper Groza criticizes the movement for its close cooperation with CPRF and its contradictory attitude towards the Russo-Ukrainian War.
