= State Council of Russia =

State Council of Russia may refer to:

- State Council of the Russian Federation, an advisory body to the President of Russia
- State Council of Imperial Russia, an advisory body to the Rulers of Imperial Russia
