= Sedmoi Kontinent =

Grocery retail chain in Russia and Belarus

- Type: OAO
- Industry: Grocery retail
- Founded: 1994
- Founder: Vladimir Gruzdev, Alexander Zanadvorov, Grigory Berezkin
- Headquarters: Moscow, Russia
- Area served: Russia, Belarus
- Revenue: $1.27 billion (2007)
- Net income: 1,220,000,000 Russian ruble (2013)
- Website: corporate.7cont.ru

Sedmoi Kontinent (Russian: Седьмой Континент, lit. 'Seventh Continent') is a major grocery retail chain operating 140 stores in Russia and one in Belarus. It is headquartered in Moscow.

The platform for Seventh continent was from the firm Slavyanka founded in 1992 by Aleksander Mamut, Vladimir Gruzdev and Grigory Berezkin. Seventh Continent was Founded in 1994, Sedmoi Kontinent was the first new Russian food retailer since the dissolution of the Soviet Union. In the early 2000s, the company launched a major expansion program and saw its revenue increasing from $105 million in 2000 to $1.27 billion in 2007.

== History ==
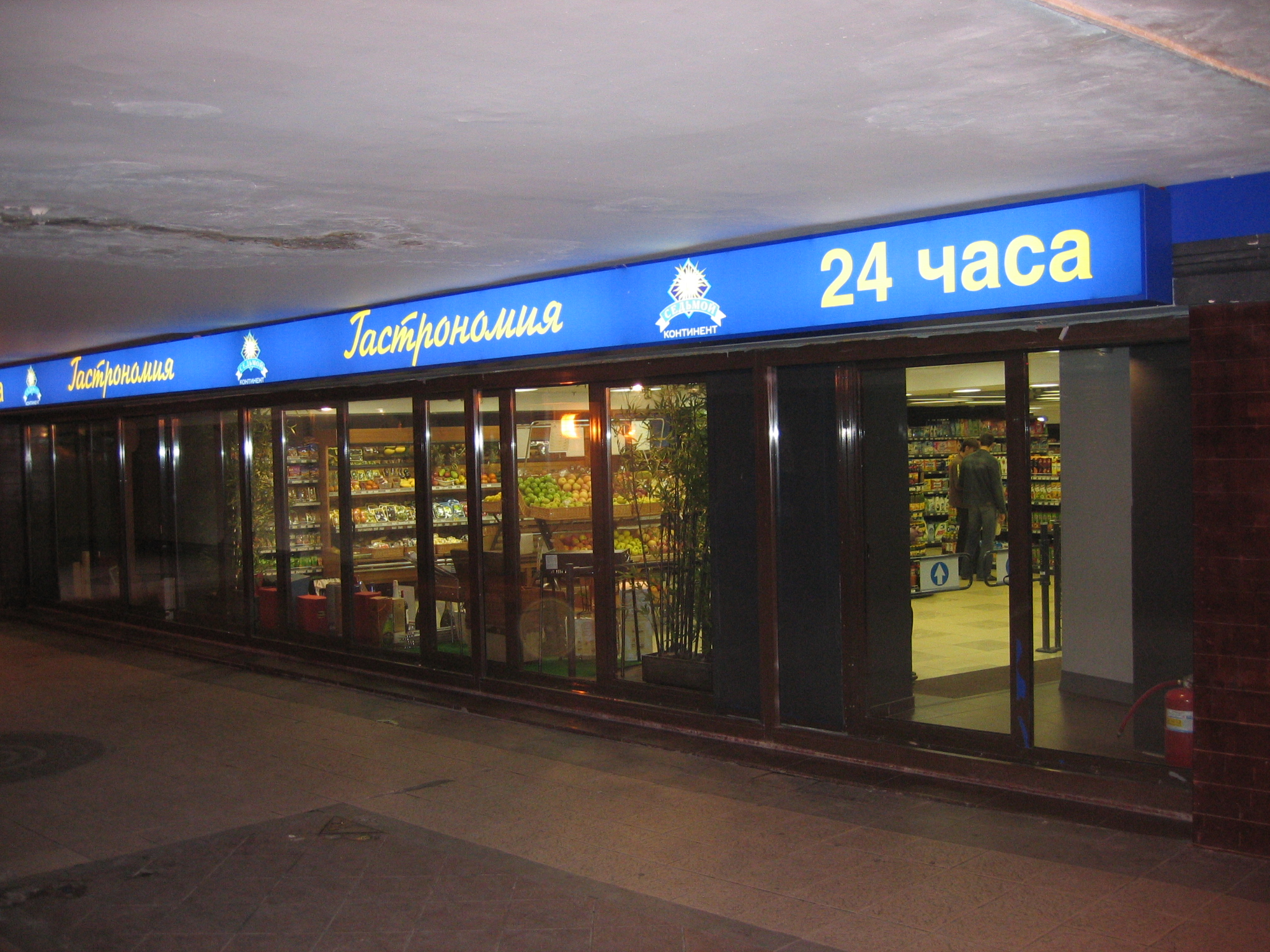
A Sedmoi Kontinent - Gastronomiya store in Moscow

The company was founded in 1994 by Vladimir Gruzdev, Alexander Zanadvorov and Grigory Berezkin.

In July 2001, Sedmoi Kontinent announced its results for the year 2000: revenue grew 50%, standing at $105 million. The company, which by then had 15 stores, all located in Moscow, said that it would launch a major expansion with the aim of increasing the number of stores to 35 before the year end. The company was also looking for a strategic investor, but had been unsuccessful so far. In August 2002, the company said it was looking for a foreign partner to stay competitive in the market.

By 2002, the company was among the 4 largest retail chains in Moscow. The company's revenue that year was $300.5 million. In 2003, its revenue grew to $445 million. According to a Mercer Human Resource Consulting study from 2002, Sedmoi Kontinent is a medium-priced store, while Ramstore was the cheapest supermarket and Kalinka Stockmann was expensive and targeted for the high-end segment.

In November 2004, Sedmoi Kontinent became the first Russian retail food company to offer stocks to the public by offering 8,415,573 ordinary shares with a face value of 0.5 rubles on the Russian Trading System (RTS) stock exchange. The company said it sold 8.42 million shares, corresponding to a 13% share in the company, at a price of 275 rubles ($9.59) per share, raising a total of $80.7 million, and said that it was planning to use the money to finance new stores. Sedmoi Kontinent was the eight Russian company to make initial public offering since the collapse of the Soviet Union.

In 2005, Sedmoi Kontinent expanded its business to the Kaliningrad Region by acquiring the Kaliningrad-based Altyn chain. Via the purchase, Sedmoi Kontinent gained 29,500 square meters of trading space and 12 stores in the region.

By April 2008, Sedmoi Kontinent had 133 stores, most of them in the Moscow Region. The company's revenue in 2007 was $1.27 billion with a net profit of $99.2 million.

In February 2009, the French retail company Carrefour made an offer for 74.8% stake in Sedmoi Kontinent. Carrefour estimated the market value of Sedmoi Kontinent as $1.25 billion.

In June 2009, it was reported that the company had defaulted on bonds worth 1.9 billion rubles ($61 million), but it managed to get 7 billion rubles of its debts restructured in November 2009.

The company delisted from the Moscow Exchange in 2012.

== Operation ==
Since 2002 the company has operated a division of "Delivery Services" based on an online store, delivery is carried out in "old" Moscow and within 25 km from the MKAD daily from 9.00 to 23.00. The fleet consists of about 40 commercial vehicles Citroen, Peugeot and VAZ.

At the end of December 2008 it was included in the list of companies that will receive state support during the crisis.

According to the results of 2014, the revenue of JSC Seventh Continent amounted to 54.175 billion rubles.

At the beginning of 2016, the chain's stores were presented in two formats — supermarkets "Seventh Continent" (138 stores) and hypermarkets "Nash" (21 stores). In total, the network of Seventh Continent OJSC includes 209 stores in Moscow and the Moscow region, as well as in Kaliningrad, Perm, Belgorod, Vologda, Ivanovo, Nizhny Novgorod, Obninsk, Ryazan, Chelyabinsk, Rostov-on-Don and Yaroslavl.

== Stores ==
Sedmoi Kontinent was one of the first Russian multi-format retail chains. Its two major formats are supermarkets and hypermarkets.

Sedmoi Kontinent operates the following types of stores:

- Sed’moy kontinent - Pyat’ Zvezd (The Seventh Continent - Five Stars)
- Sed’moy kontinent - Universam (The Seventh Continent - Universam)
- Sed'moy kontinent-Ryadom s domom (The Seventh Continent - Next Door)
- Sed’moy kontinent - Gastronomiya (The Seventh Continent - Gastronomy)
- NASH Gypermarket (OUR Hypermarket)
- Prostor.

As of July 2010, the company had 121 supermarkets and 4 hypermarkets in Moscow and the Moscow Oblast, 10 supermarkets in Kaliningrad Oblast and one hypermarket in each of the following locations: Ryazan, Chelyabinsk, Minsk (Belarus), Perm, Belgorod and Yaroslavl.

== Owners and management ==
The main owners are entrepreneur Alexander Zanadvorov (74.81%), the family foundation of the ex-governor of the Tula region Vladimir Gruzdev (10%). Some of the company's shares were traded on the RTS and MICEX exchanges. Until November 2007, a large stake in 7K Invest Holding (which owned 74.81% of Seventh Continent OJSC until February 2008) belonged to State Duma Deputy Vladimir Gruzdev.

Chairman of the Board of Directors of the company — Vladimir Senkin, CEO — Anatoly Podlesov.
