= Shanyavsky Moscow City People's University =

1910s private university in Moscow

Coordinates: 55.7772°N 37.5953°E

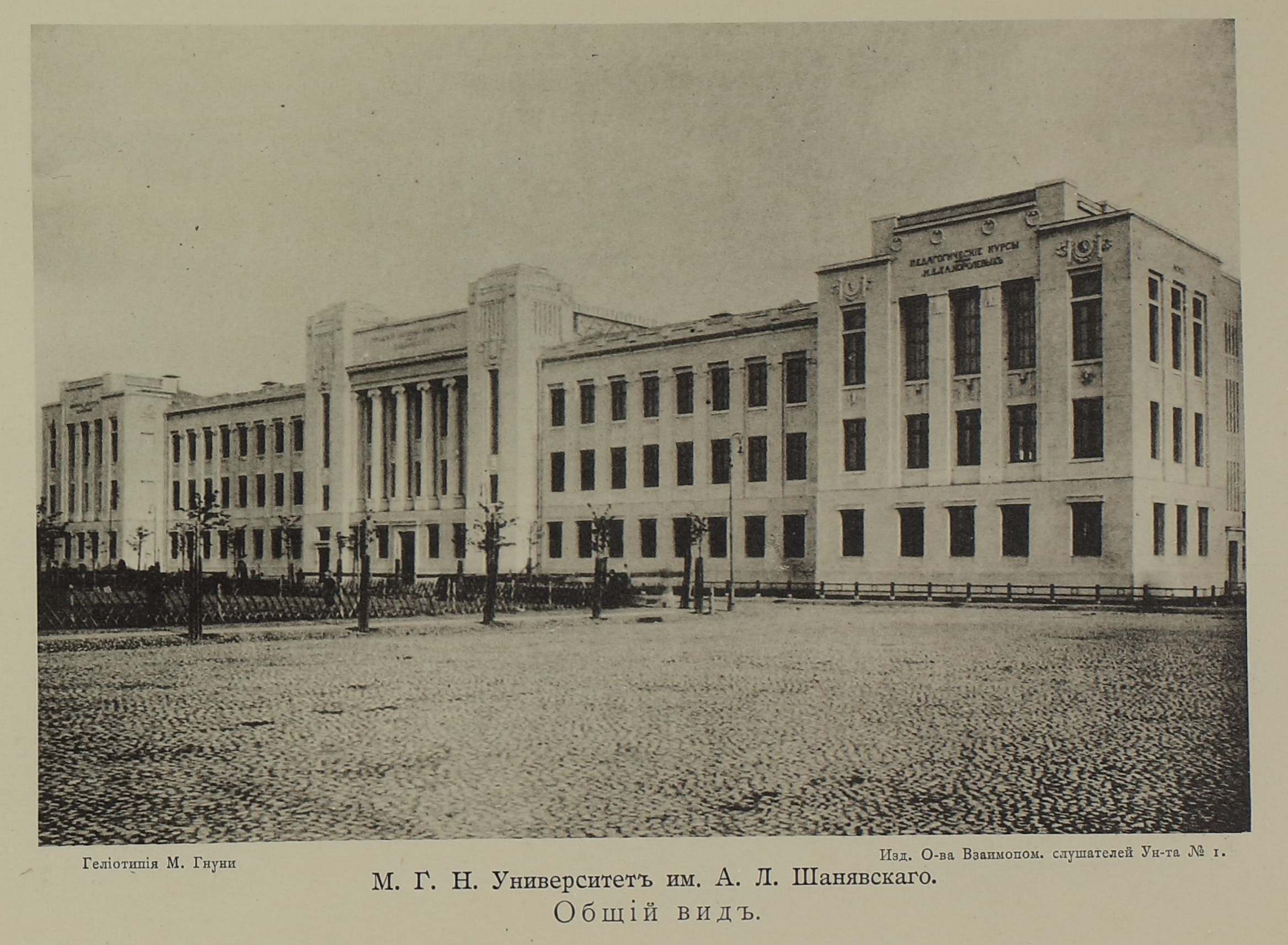
The building in 1911

Shanyavsky Moscow City People's University (Russian: Московский городской народный университет имени А. Л. Шанявского) was a university in Moscow that was founded in 1908 with funds from the gold mining philanthropist Alfons Shanyavsky. The university was nationalized in 1918 after the Russian revolution and merged into the Russian State University for the Humanities.

The university was officially founded on October 2, 1908 after many years of bureaucratic wrangling between Lidia, the wife of deceased mining magnate A. L. Shanyavsky and the city of Moscow. The aim of the university was to provide education in all branches of knowledge to any person. The city was governed by a board of trustees including half appointed by the City Duma. In the first semester 400 students joined and by 1912 there were 3600 students. The university building was established by the city council on Miusskaya Square on July 21, 1911. It had 23 classrooms with two amphitheaters that could hold 200 students each and another that could take 600. Teachers at the university included A. Kizevetter, A. Chayanov, M. Bogoslovsky, Y. Gauthier, M. V. Pavlova, N. K. Koltsov and others. Many of the early professors came from Moscow State University after quitting due to Lev Kasso. The university became a centre for the organization of students for the 1917 revolution. In 1918 the university was closed and the management moved from the trustees to the People's Commissariat for Education. In 1919 it became a part of the Moscow State University.
