= Alfons Shanyavsky =

Polish-Russian philanthropist (1837–1905)

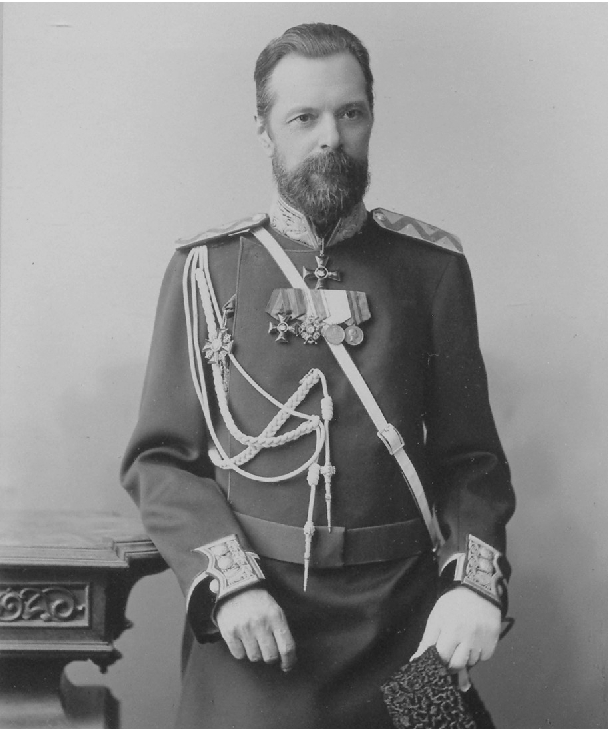
- Shanyavsky c. 1870
- Born: February 21, 1837; Shanyavy, Poland
- Died: November 20, 1905 (aged 68)
- Occupations: Russian officer and mine owner
- Known for: Establishment of the Shanyavsky Moscow City People's University
- Spouse: Lidia Alekseevna (m. 1872)

Alfons Leonovich Shanyavsky (Russian: Альфонс Леонович Шанявский; 21 February 1837 – 20 November 1905) was a Russian officer of Polish noble origins who became a gold mining business owner and later philanthropist who helped establish the Moscow City People's University which ran from 1908 to 1920 when it was merged into the Russian State University for the Humanities.

== Early life ==
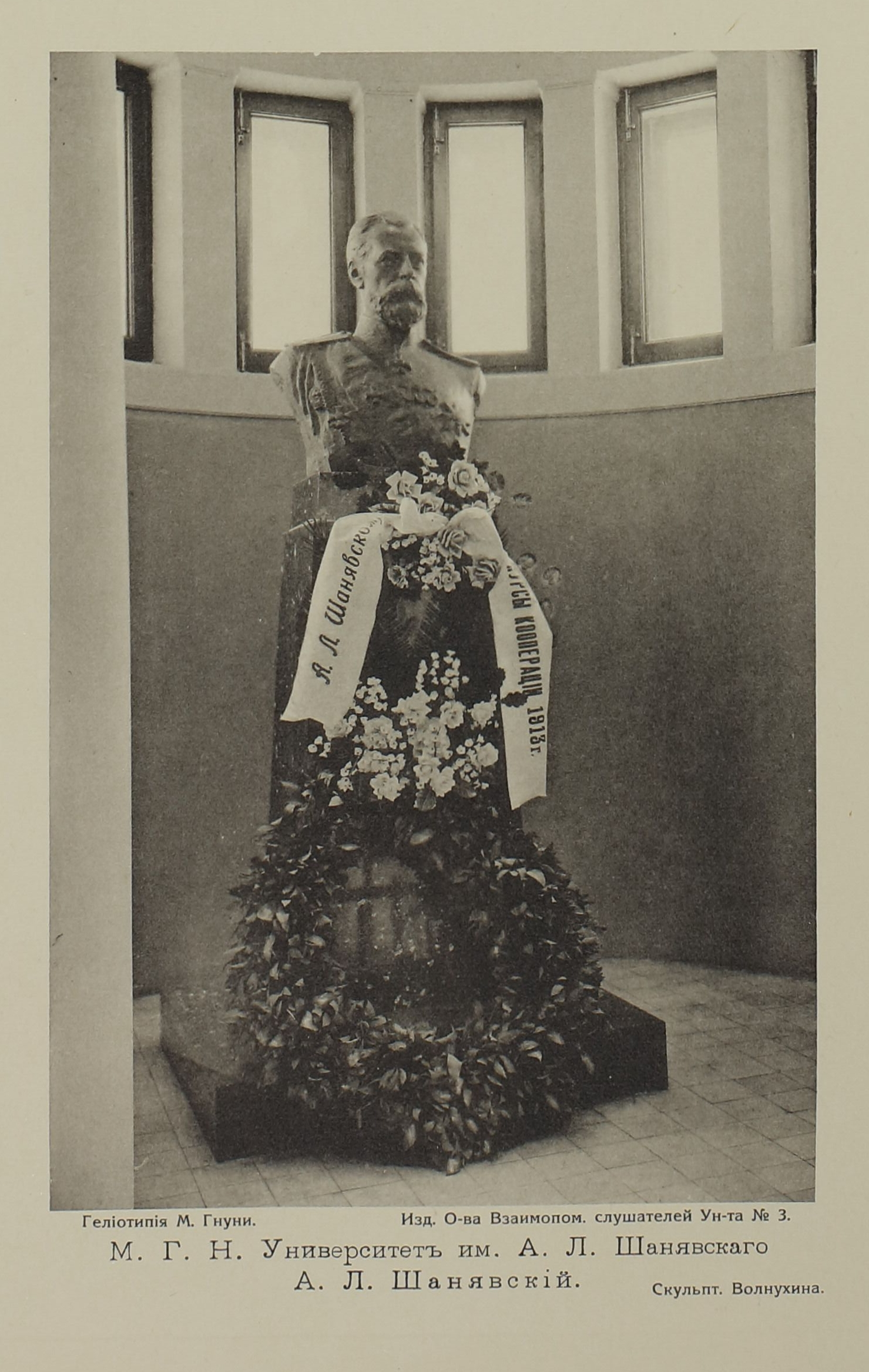
Statue of Shanyavsky at the university he helped found

Shanyavsky was born in the Shanyavsky family of Polish nobility who came from the town of Shanyavy. Archbishop Joseph Shanyavsky had taken part in the 1794 Kościuszko Uprising. At the age of nine, Alfons was sent to Russia as part of a rule for every Polish family to send a boy into the Imperial Russian Army. After graduating from a cadet corps school in Tula he went to the Oryol Cadet Corps and then to the Konstantinovsky Military School in Saint Petersburg.

== Career ==
Graduating with honors he joined the Jaeger regiment and then went to the Academy of the General Staff, graduating in 1861 with honours again.

Shanyavsky was soon promoted to general but poor health (tuberculosis) made him move to eastern Siberia on the invitation of Count Nikolai Nikolaevich Muravyov-Amursky. He worked there as an adjutant and the staff there included Pyotr Kropotkin, Nikolai Yadrinsky, and Colonel K. N. Pedashenko. He married Lidia Alekseevna, daughter of Alexei Fedorovich, a factory owner in Nerchinsk in 1872. The family became owners of 22 gold mines along the Zeya River and he was a partner in the company they named Zeya. In 1877 they started a second company called Verkhnezeyskaya. Following the death of one partner, Sabashnikov, Shanyavsky became the managing partner of the companies Zeyskaya and another called Mogotskaya. More gold mining companies followed and he became wealthy, and moved to Moscow. His wife Lidia worked for the creation of the higher women's medical courses from 1882 and a Women's Medical Institute was finally established by Nicholas II in 1894. The Shanyavskys donated 300,000 rubles and a partner P.V. Berg bequeathed 200,000 for the creation of the university. They also helped establish a gymnasium in Blagoveshchensk and an agricultural school in Chita. In 1903 he sold off his mining companies and his illness became worse.

== Death and legacy ==
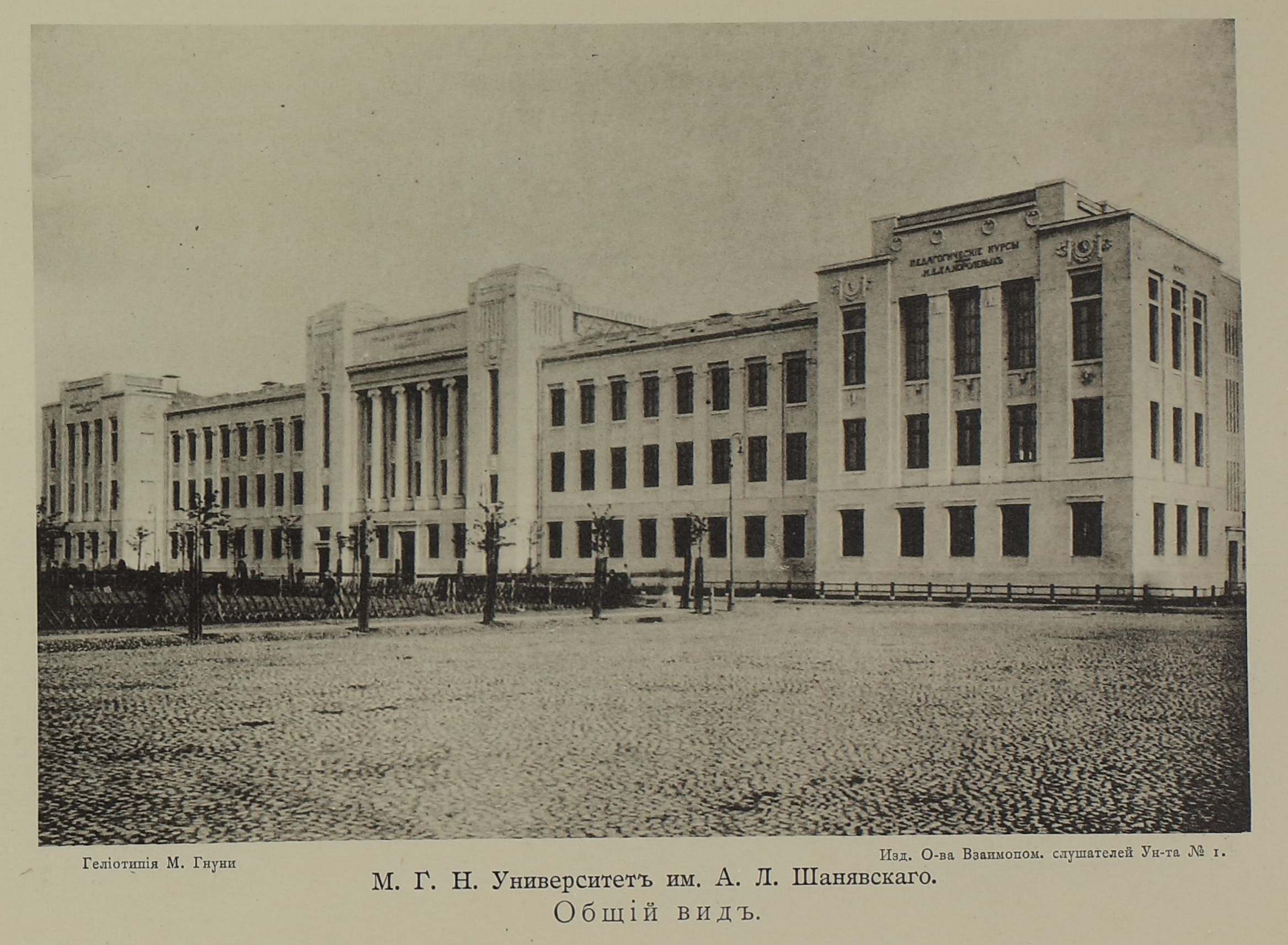
Shanyavsky Moscow City People's University building around 1911

Shanyavsky wished that his wealth would be used for establishing a free university, independent of authorities, where anyone could study. He wrote in his will that his money would go to his wife who would bequeath her wealth to the university.

The deed of gift was notarized on the morning of the day that Shanyavsky died. His wife Lidia had to work with Moscow City Duma to help begin the university. A condition was that if the university was not begun before 3 October 1908, the funds would be transferred to the Saint Petersburg Women's Institute. The bureaucracy was slow and the university was founded on 2 October 1908. In the first semester 400 students joined and by 1912 there were 3600 students. The university building was established on Miusskaya Square on 21 July 1911.

Shanyavsky was buried in the cemetery of the Novo-Alekseevsky Monastery and in 1921 Lydia was also buried in the same grave. The cemetery and monastery were destroyed in 1930.
