= Vyacheslav Dudka =

Russian politician (born 1960)

- Вячеслав Дудка
- Dudka in 2009

3rd Governor of Tula Oblast
- In office 29 April 2005 – 29 July 2011
- Preceded by: Vasily Starodubtsev
- Succeeded by: Vladimir Gruzdev

Personal details
- Born: 23 April 1960 (age 66) Tula, RSFSR, Soviet Union
- Party: United Russia (2007–2011)

Military service
- Allegiance: Soviet Union; Russia
- Branch/service: GRAU
- Years of service: 1982–1998
- Rank: Colonel

Vyacheslav Dmitriyevich Dudka (Russian: Вячеслав Дмитриевич Дудка; born 23 April 1960) is a Russian politician who served as the governor of Tula Oblast 2005–2011.

Vyacheslav Dudka was born in 1960 in Tula, Russia. In 1982 he graduated from the Tula high school of artillery engineers. From 1986 to 1998 Dudka served in the Main Missile and Artillery Directorate of Soviet and then Russian army.

Since 2000 he was deputy general director of the KBP Instrument Design Bureau, one of the top enterprises of Russia's defence industry. In 2003, Dudka became a part of "president's personnel reserve" and replaced communist governor Vasily Starodubtsev in April 2005. In 2010 Dudka was renominated for a second term by president Dmitry Medvedev.

On 29 July 2011 Dudka resigned from his post of the governor. Some sources connected his dismissal with the corruption scandal in which Dudka may be involved. Eventually, in 2013, Dudka was sentenced for 9.5 years of penal colony for bribetaking. He was granted parole in June 2018.
