= Russian State University for the Humanities =

University in Moscow, Russia

- Российский государственный гуманитарный университет
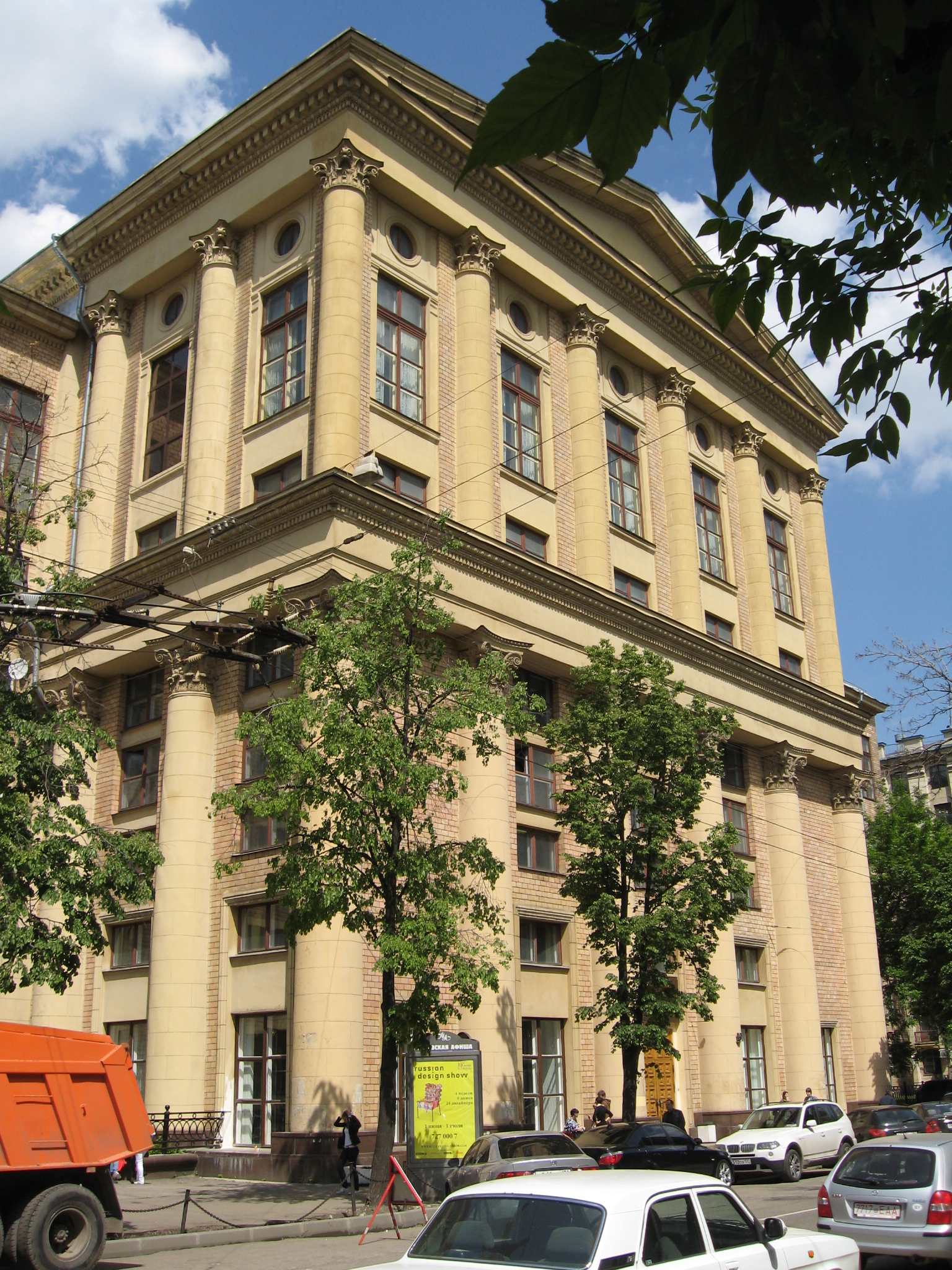
- RSUH main building in 2015
- Former names: Moscow Public University (1908–1918), Moscow State Institute for History and Archives (1930–1990)
- Motto: Вековые традиции — современные технологии
- Motto in English: Centuries-old Tradition, Contemporary Technology
- Type: Public
- Established: 1991
- President: Yefim Iosifovich Pivovar
- Provost: Dmitry Viktorovich Bobrov
- Rector: Andrey Victorovich Loginov
- Students: more than 25,000
- Location: Moscow, Russia; 55°46′39″N 37°35′47″E
- Campus: Urban
- Colors
- Nicknames: RSUH, RGGU
- Website: www.rsuh.ru/en/

University rankings

Global – Overall
- USNWR Global: 1,201 (2023)

Regional – Overall
- QS Emerging Europe and Central Asia: 231-240 (2022)

The Russian State University for the Humanities (RSUH; Russian: Росси́йский госуда́рственный гуманита́рный университе́т (РГГУ), romanized: Rossiyskiy gosudarstvennyy gumanitarnyy universitet (RGGU)) is a university in Moscow, Russia with over 25,000 students. It was created in 1991 as the result of the merger of the Moscow Urban University of the People (est. 1908) and the Moscow State University for History and Archives (est. 1930).

== History ==
The Moscow Urban University of the People also known as the Shanyavsky People's University was founded in 1908 on the initiative of the Russian patron of the arts, Alfons Shanyavsky, and played a role in Russian higher education from its inception.

The Moscow State Institute for History and Archives, founded in 1930 as a center for the preparation of archivists, became over the years a focus of scientific research. In its archival pursuits in areas of history and such auxiliary realms as the study of primary sources, archaeology and palaeography, it managed to preserve Russian research. By the beginning of the 1990s, this institution had achieved university level which enabled it to become the organizational heart of the RSUH, founded in 1991.

The university, has established a connection to international scientific community and has ties with universities abroad, including Université Laval, Trinity College, Helwan University, Cairo University, University of Freiburg and University of Vienna.

Alexander Borisovich Bezborodov, Rector of the university, was suspended by the European University Association (EUA) following support for the Russian invasion of Ukraine by the Russian Union of Rectors (RUR) in March 2022, for being "diametrically opposed to the European values that they committed to when joining EUA".

== University structure ==
RSUH currently comprises eleven institutes, eighteen faculties, eight laboratories, and fifty departments. There are five university-wide faculties:

- Faculty of Philosophy
- Faculty of History of Art
- Faculty of Sociology
- Faculty of Cultural Studies
- Faculty of PR and Advertising

The eleven institutes are:

- Historical and Archival Institute
  - This consists of Faculty of Archiving, Faculty of Documentation And Technotronic Archives, Faculty of History, Political Science, and Law and Faculty of International Relations and Foreign Regional Studies.
- Institute of Economics, Management and Law
  - Including of Faculty of Economics, Faculty of Management and Faculty of Law
- L. S. Vygotsky Institute of Psychology
  - Including Faculty of Psychology and Faculty of Psychology of the Education
- Institute of Mass Media and Advertising
  - Including Faculty of Journalism
- Institute of Linguistics (Russian Wikipedia)
  - Including of Faculty of Theory and Practice Of Linguistics
- Institute of Information Sciences and Security Technologies
  - Including Faculty of Information Systems and Security
- Institute of History and Philology
  - Including Faculty of History and Philology
- Institute for Oriental and Classical Studies (Russian Wikipedia)
- International Institute of the New Educational Technologies
- Institute of Additional Education
- Institute of Regional Post-Soviet Research

Across the university and its institutes and faculties, there are more than 50 scientific centres. Its curriculum extends from preparatory to post-doctoral studies. In 2023, Educational and scientific center—Ivan Ilyin Higher School of Politics was established.

The university also serves as the main centre for the Moscow School of Comparative Linguistics.

== Campus ==
The main campus of the university is located near the Novoslobodskaya Metro Station in the North-Western part of Moscow. It is a closed campus consisting of 7 corpuses, 6 being used for the educational purposes and one (Corpus 4) used as a dormitory for the international students. The main corpus is the corpus 6, which, among other things, consists of the main University library and the University Museum. The university scientific library has a physical, as well as digital collection, providing scientific works and fiction. The libraries reading room, also located in the main corpus, consists of 3 big halls (2 of which have a second tier). Corpus 6 is connected to the corpus 7, which was the first building in the main campus to enter the new university in 1991. Corpus 7 used to serve as Moscow Urban University Of the People (in the name of A. Shanyavskiy).

There are 2 other smaller separate campuses in the different parts of the city, one serving as a home for Institute of Information Sciences and Security Technologies, and the other one as a home for Historical and Archival Institute. The latter is located in Kitay-gorod in the city center. It used to be a main campus for Moscow State University of History And Archives, which later became a base for newly established Russian State University for the Humanities. The institute occupies a network of historic buildings along the Nikolskaya Street, including the former Moscow Print Yard and the cells of the Zaikonospassky Monastery.

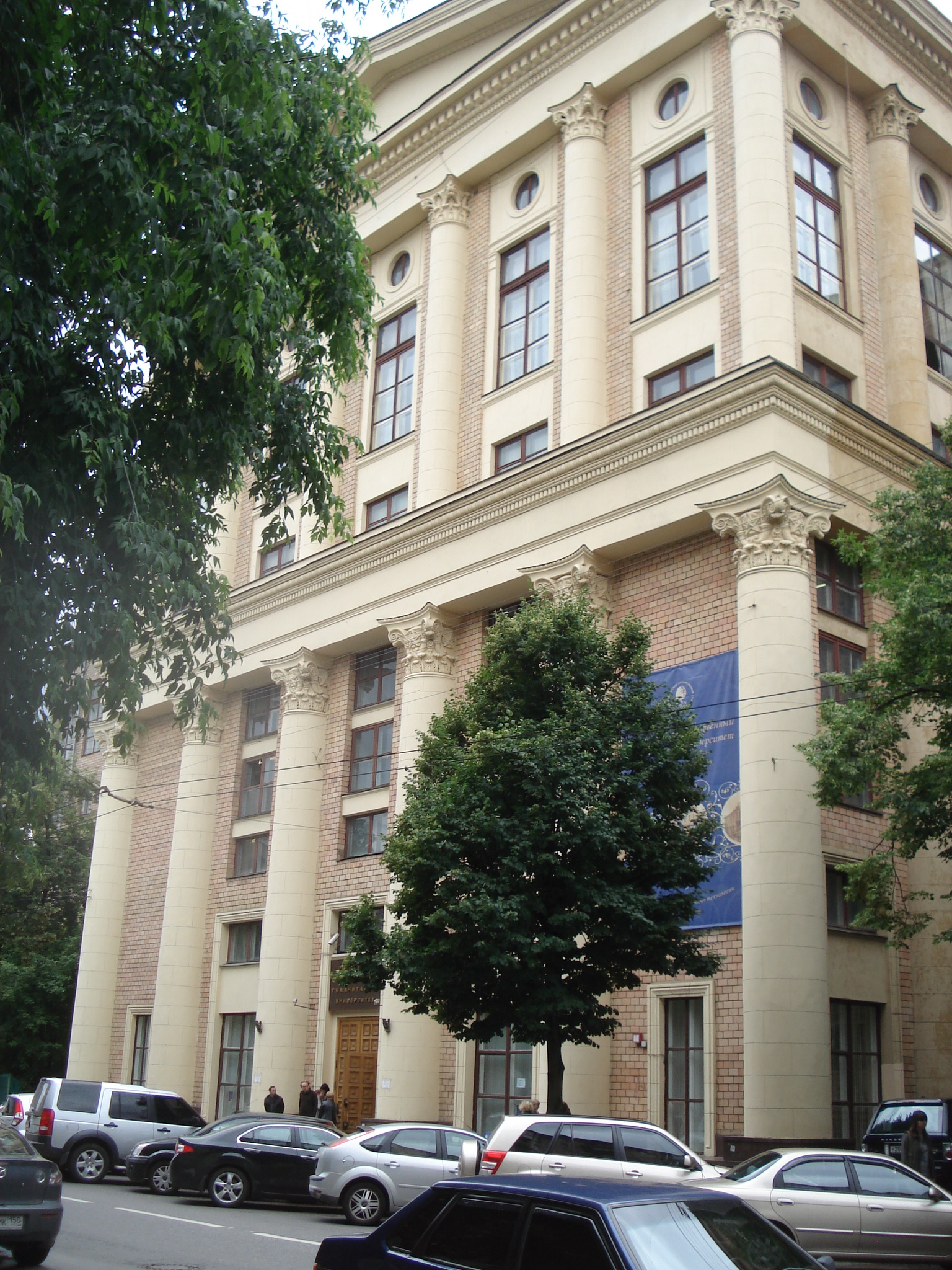
Main Building (Corpus 6)

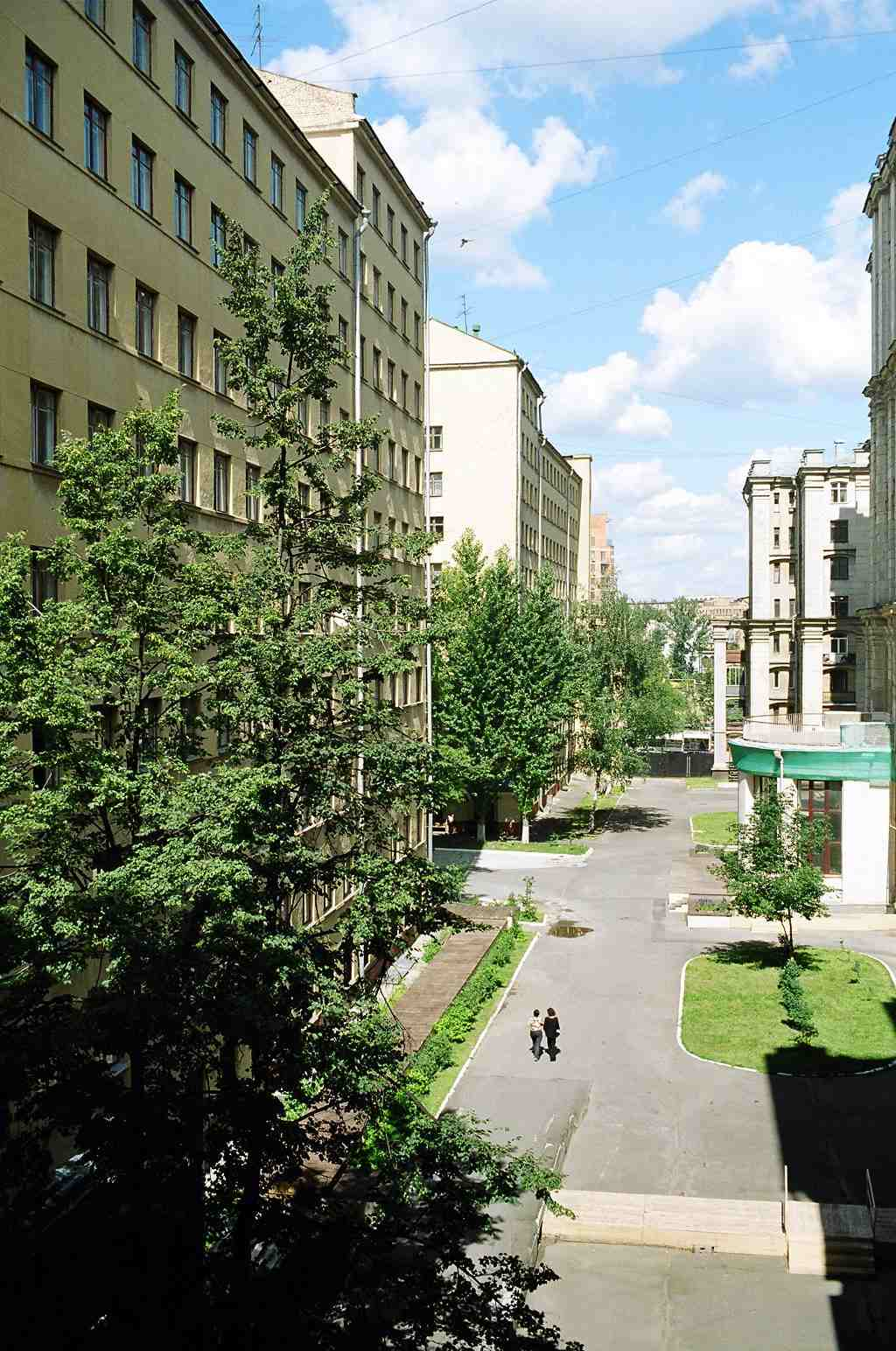
View of the RSUH campus

== Ratings ==
In 2014, the Expert RA agency included the university in the list of higher educational institutions of the Commonwealth of Independent States, where it was assigned a rating class of "D" (acceptable level of graduate training). Already in 2017, at a meeting of the public council of the United Russia party project "Modernization of Education", according to the rector of Moscow State University, Viktor Sadovnichiy, RSUH, among other universities, entered the top ten "leaders of the Russian segment" of education.

== Notable alumni ==
- Anna Nemzer (born 1980), journalist.
- Yael Eilan, business executive, anthropologist, and academic researcher.

== See also ==
- Education in Russia
- Student Anti-Fascist Front
