= State Council (Russia) =

Advisory body to the Russian president

State Council of the Russian Federation
- Государственный Совет Российской Федерации; Gosudarstvennyy Sovet Rossiyskoy Federatsii
- Emblem of the President of the Russian Federation

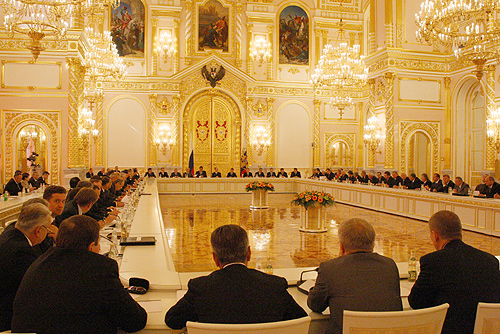
- Meeting of the State Council (6 September 2008)

Advisory council overview
- Formed: September 1, 2000; 25 years ago
- Preceding Advisory council: State Council under the President of the Russian Soviet Federative Socialist Republic
- Type: Advisory council
- Jurisdiction: Domestic policy; Foreign policy; Socioeconomic development
- Headquarters: Grand Kremlin Palace, Moscow Kremlin, Moscow, Russia
- Chairman responsible: Vladimir Putin, President of the Russian Federation
- Secretary responsible: Aleksey Dyumin
- Parent department: State Council Presidium
- Parent agency: President of the Russian Federation
- Key documents: Article(s) 80, 85, Constitution of the Russian Federation; Federal law “On the Procedure for Forming the Federation Council of the Federal Assembly of the Russian Federation.”
- Website: en.kremlin.ru/structure/state-council

The State Council (Russian: Государственный Совет) is an advisory body to the Russian head of state, which deals with issues of the highest importance to the state as a whole. The council was established by a decree of the President of Russia, Vladimir Putin, on September 1, 2000.

== History ==
The current State Council is the third in the history of Russia. It is the successor to the State Council under the President of the RSFSR (1991) and the Imperial State Council (1810–1917). The former was created on July 19, 1991, under the leadership of the President of the Republic, and included the State Secretary of the RSFSR, State Councilors of the RSFSR, and a number of ministers and chairmen of state committees. On November 6, 1991, the State Council of the RSFSR was abolished.

The President signed the decree forming the State Council on the basis of articles 80 and 85 of the Constitution and the newly passed Federal Law "On the Procedure for Forming the Federation Council of the Federal Assembly of the Russian Federation." The President formed the State Council in order to harness the potential of regional leaders. In doing so, he took into account the requests and proposals of the Federation Council, the upper house of the Russian parliament members and State Duma deputies. On September 2, 2000, Putin established the Presidium of the State Council, whose task is to prepare for State Council sessions.

== Structure ==
In its capacity as an advisory body, the State Council aids the President in discharging his duties to ensure the concerted functioning and interaction of various governmental bodies. The Chairman of the State Council is the President of Russia. Upon his order, the acting Secretary of the State Council is currently one of the aides to the President, Alexander S. Abramov.

The Presidential Domestic Affairs Directorate is responsible for the administrative support of the State Council. The Council is made up of the leaders (governors and presidents) of Russia's Federal Subjects. Other persons may be appointed to the Council at the President's discretion. The Presidium comprises the leaders of seven constituent territories representing each of the seven federal districts. Members of the Presidium rotate every six months, as envisaged by the regulations of the State Council and the Presidential Decree on the Council's Presidium.

The State Council considers issues of particular importance to the state, such as the development of governmental institutions, economic and social reforms and other objects affecting the public as a whole. The sessions are the principal medium for the work of the State Council and are held four times a year without a rigid timetable. Each session focuses on a single issue. On the eve of a session of the State Council, the Presidium meets to discuss the following day's issue. It has also become accepted practice to discuss some issues at joint sessions of the State Council's Presidium and the Security Council, sometimes with the participation of other presidential advisory bodies.

== See also ==
- State Council of Imperial Russia
