= Grigory Berezkin =

Russian businessman

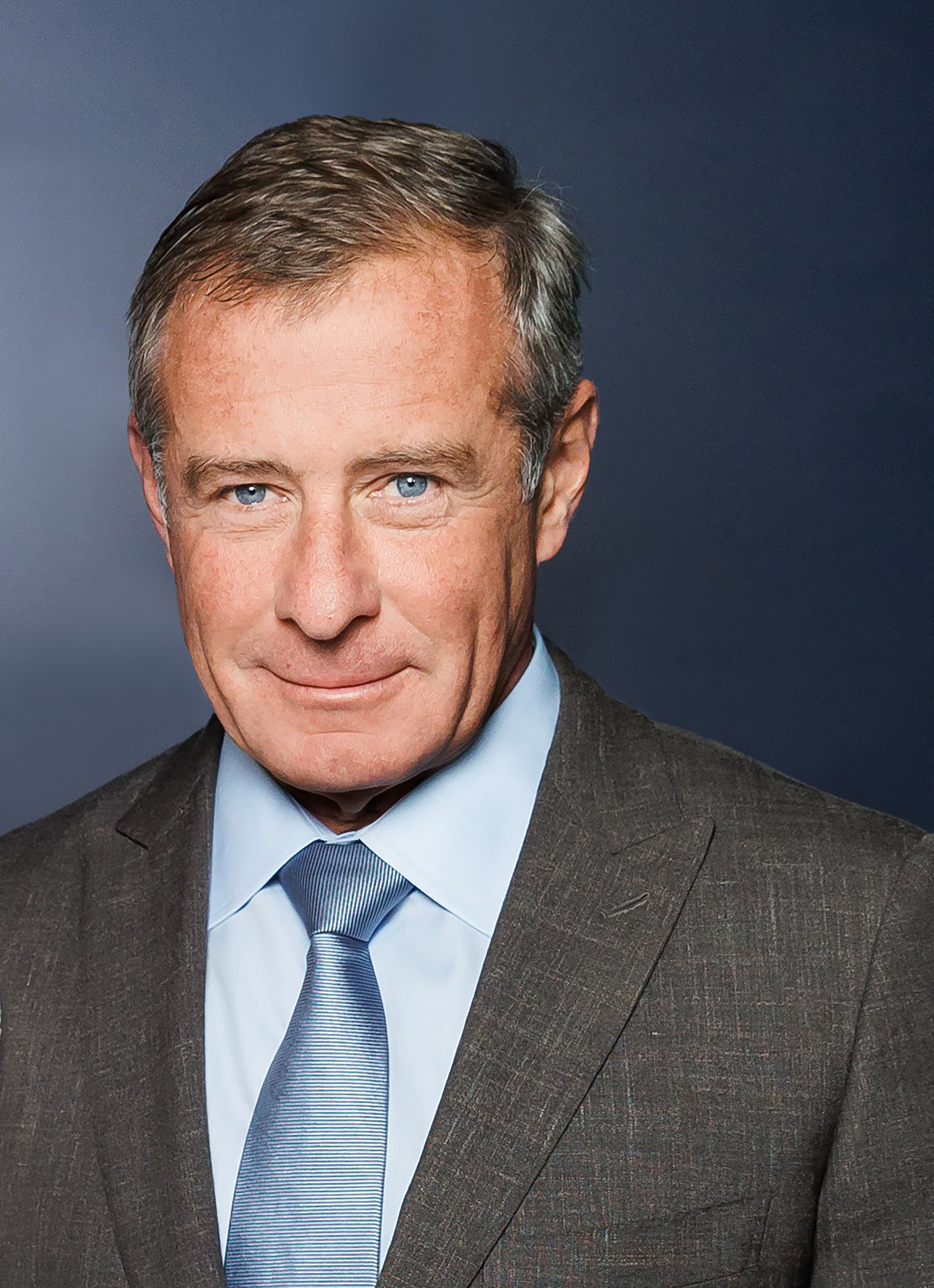
- Born: 9 August 1966 (age 60); Moscow, Soviet Union
- Citizenship: Russia, Croatia, Cyprus (until 2022)
- Known for: owner, CEO of ESN Group and RBK Group

Grigory Berezkin (9 August 1966) is a Russian businessman. He is the owner and chairman of the Board of Directors of ESN Group and RBC Group. Since 2012, his primary focus has shifted toward social entrepreneurship and philanthropy, when he joined the Board of Trustees of Russian branch of Reach for Change foundation. Berezkin holds Russian and Croatian citizenship (since 2007). Until 2022, he also held Cypriot citizenship.

== Biography ==
Grigory Berezkin was born on 9 August 1966 in Moscow. His father, Viktor, was a renowned chemist and one of the world's leading experts in chromatography. His mother, Lyudmila, headed a research division at the Research Institute for Fertilizers and Insectofungicides named after Ya. V. Samoilov.

In 9th and 10th grade he attended the School of Young Physicists and Young Chemists. In 1988, he graduated from Moscow State University with a degree in Petrochemistry. In 1991, he completed his postgraduate studies there, and in 1993, he defended his PhD thesis in Chemical Sciences.

From 1991 to 1994, he worked at Moscow State University as a junior research fellow.

== Business career ==
=== Early business career ===
While still working on his PhD thesis, Berezkin began exploring business opportunities. In 1989, he co-founded a cooperative that developed IT systems for oil refineries in the Urals and Siberia.

In the early 1990s, using profits from this business, he invested in cable production for the oil industry. He imported equipment from Sweden and organized the production of cables for oil pumps. At the time, such cable was in short supply in Russia.

In May 1992, Berezkin co-founded Slavyanka, a company established on the basis of Store No. 2 of the Oktyabrsky District Food Retail Association.

In 1993, after he began trading oil, he met Roman Abramovich, who was engaged in the supply of oil products from the Komi Republic. In 1994, Berezkin became deputy general director of Komineft and head of its Moscow representative office. At the same time, he managed the Mesko company, a joint venture of Komineft and RAO International Economic Cooperation, which was also one of the key shareholders of Komineft. In the same year, the KomiTEK holding was created on the basis of Komineft, the Ukhta Oil Refinery and Kominefteprodukt.

In 1994 he became deputy general director of Komineft and simultaneously its general representative in Moscow. In the same year, the KomiTEK holding was created on the basis of Komineft, the Ukhta Oil Refinery and Kominefteprodukt.

In 1995, Berezkin negotiated a pre-export financing agreement with a consortium of European banks, including United Overseas Bank (later UBS), providing KomiTEK with funding secured against future oil deliveries. The European Bank for Reconstruction and Development (EBRD) and the World Bank also invested more than $120 million in the company’s environmental initiatives. Total and Elf (later TotalEnergies) were involved in exploration and production projects with Komineft, while joint ventures were formed with Neste and Marc Rich & Co. (later Glencore). During the same period, KomiTEK’s shareholders included Credit Suisse First Boston (CSFB) and Brunswick Securities.

In 1995, Berezkin collected the required number of voter signatures and ran as an independent candidate for the State Duma in a single-member constituency. He was among 2,628 candidates who contested single-member seats in the election, but was not elected The election was monitored by 993 international observers from 61 countries. Members of the observation mission assessed the election as free and fair.

In 1997, he became Chairman of the Board of Directors of KomiTEK.

In 1997-1999, he worked as Chairman of the Board of Directors of ZAO AKB Ukhtabank.

In 1999, he organized the sale of the KomiTEK holding to Lukoil for over $600 million.

By the early 2000s, Berezkin had accumulated significant capital and withdrew from the oil business.

=== Electric Power ===
In 2000, Berezkin took control of Kolenergo, a power system operating largely above the Arctic Circle, under a management agreement lasting until 2003. ESN Group was established to manage this asset.

As part of an anti-crisis programme at Kolenergo, Berezkin overhauled management by introducing international standards adapted to local conditions and implemented financial reforms, including changes to pricing, financial controls and debt restructuring, as well as signing an agreement linking electricity prices to aluminium prices on the London Metal Exchange.

He also initiated a public relations campaign to improve payment collection and public awareness of the energy sector. Kolenergo developed cross-border transmission links with Finland and Norway, enabling electricity exports to European markets, including trading on the Nord Pool exchange. With the turnaround complete, Berezkin left the energy sector in 2003. With this conclusion of oil and energy businesses, ESN Group became obsolete and was fully dissolved over time.

In 2004, Berezkin and Enel formed a joint venture. One of its key projects was the Northwest Power Plant in St. Petersburg, a combined-cycle gas turbine facility using Siemens equipment, a technology then being introduced in Russia. Combined-cycle plants offered higher fuel efficiency and lower emissions than traditional thermal power plants.

=== Media business ===
From the mid-2000s, Berezkin was involved in a number of publishing projects. In 2007, he acquired the Komsomolskaya Pravda publishing house, which he owned until 2011. In 2008, he launched the Moscow edition of Metro, part of an international newspaper franchise published in major cities worldwide. Berezkin created a new business model focused on cost efficiency and advertising revenue, developed quality content that attracted readers. The newspaper’s readership grew, and by 2019 the weekly readership had reached about 6 million. In 2020 Berezkin sold the business to a strategic investor.

He bought a 65% stake in a RBC (Russian media group) in 2017. Following the acquisition, he retained the existing editorial team and focused on the company’s development. RBC expanded its digital infrastructure and range of services, operating across online media, print, television and radio. Its digital platforms have a monthly audience of tens of millions of users. RBC is a publicly listed company that regularly publishes financial statements for its shareholders.

== Philanthropy ==
=== Reach for Change ===
By the early 2010s, Berezkin decided to make social impact his primary focus. In 2012, Berezkin’s daughter founded the Russian branch of Reach for Change, an international foundation established by Sweden’s Kinnevik group. The organization supports social entrepreneurs working on projects for children and young people by providing funding, mentoring and business support. Berezkin joined its board. On the initiative of Berezkin, an endowment fund was established. The endowment is intended to provide the foundation with long-term financial stability to support its programmes.

In 2019, the foundation became a member of the European Venture Philanthropy Association, and in 2020 it partnered with Collaborate for Impact to develop social investment initiatives in Eastern Europe.

=== Other philanthropic activities ===
Berezkin has supported a number of charitable organisations, including the Center for Curative Pedagogics, which works with children with developmental disabilities, and the Speransky Hospital Fund, supporting a major burn treatment centre for children. Since 2012, he has also supported Joy of Old Age, focused on elderly care, and has backed Heal Together, which assists children with blood diseases. He has further supported organisations such as Science for Children, Everyone is Special and Open Heart, which provide assistance to children and people with disabilities.

Berezkin has supported the International Chemistry Olympiad and has funded research in molecular biology and bioorganic chemistry at his alma mater, Moscow State University. In 2022, he established the Viktor Berezkin Prize in memory of his father, awarded to graduate students and early-career researchers in chromatography, with separate categories for PhD and non-PhD scientists.

He organised an exhibition of works by Titian in Moscow, which brought paintings from Italian museums. The project was carried out in cooperation with Russian and Italian cultural institutions.

Berezkin has also supported international philanthropic initiatives in the fields of sport, healthcare and culture, including youth alpine and water skiing programmes in France, medical research at the Gustave Roussy cancer institute, healthcare projects implemented by the Sumba Foundation in Indonesia, and the Albertina Museum in Vienna.

== Personal life and activities ==
Berezkin has been involved in skiing since childhood and competed at university level. He has also taken part in international competitions, including the European Championships. He has supported athletes competing at the Winter Olympic Games.

He later became involved in water sports and founded the Alpha Water Ski Club in Moscow. Since 1998, he has participated in rally racing, competing in World and European Championship events, as well as in Russia’s national competitions.

Berezkin is married and has four children: three daughters and a son.

== Awards ==
Commander of the Order of Merit of the Italian Republic (2 June 2013, Italy);

Grand Officer of the Order of the Star of Italy (9 January 2020, Italy).

== Sanctions ==
Berezkin was sanctioned by European Union in April 2022. However, the EU did not renew sanctions against him after they expired in September 2023, and Berezkin was removed from the sanctions list. The grounds of sanctions did not stand in the European court of justice. They were based on an article written by AI bot Carmen.

The review of Berezkin's designation lasted approximately 18 months and reportedly involved an examination of more than 1,000 pages of materials concerning his business activities over the previous three decades. In September 2023, following a review of individual designations, the Council of the European Union removed Berezkin from the EU sanctions list.

Berezkin has been a Croatian citizen since 2007. According to EUobserver sources, Croatia quietly helped Grigory Berezkin get off the EU sanctions list.
