= Vladimir Isakov (politician) =

Russian politician (born 1987)

Vladimir Isakov MP
- Владимир Исаков
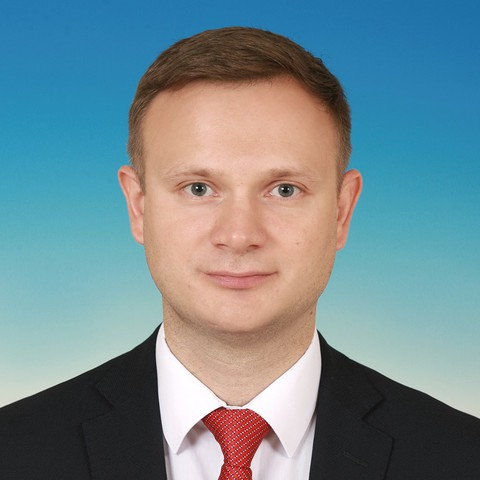
- official portrait, circa 2021

Member of the State Duma (Party List Seat)
- Incumbent
- Assumed office 12 October 2021

Personal details
- Born: 25 February 1987 (age 39) Tula, RSFSR, USSR
- Party: Communist Party of the Russian Federation
- Education: Tula State Pedagogical University

Vladimir Pavlovich Isakov (Russian: Владимир Павлович Исаков; born 25 February 1987, Tula, Russia) is a Russian political figure and a member of the 8th State Duma. Deputy Chairman of the State Duma Committee on Youth Policy.

In 2007, he joined the Russian Communist Youth League and in 2008, he became a member of the Communist Party of the Russian Federation. In 2009, he worked on various projects related to youth politics of the Central Committee of the Communist Party of the Russian Federation. From 2012 to 2014, he served as deputy of the Assembly of deputies Kurkino. On September 14, 2014, he was elected deputy of the Tula City Duma of the 5th convocation. In 2019, he was re-elected for the Tula City Duma of the 6th convocation. Since September 2021, he has served as deputy of the 8th State Duma.

On April 24, 2021, after the 18th Congress, he was re-elected as a member of the Central Committee of the Communist Party of the Russian Federation (CPRF) and, at the 1st Plenum of the Central Committee, was re-elected as a secretary of the Central Committee.

== Sanctions ==
He was sanctioned by the UK government in 2022 in relation to the Russo-Ukrainian War.
