= Dmitry Savelyev (politician, born 1968) =

Russian politician

- Дмитрий Савельев
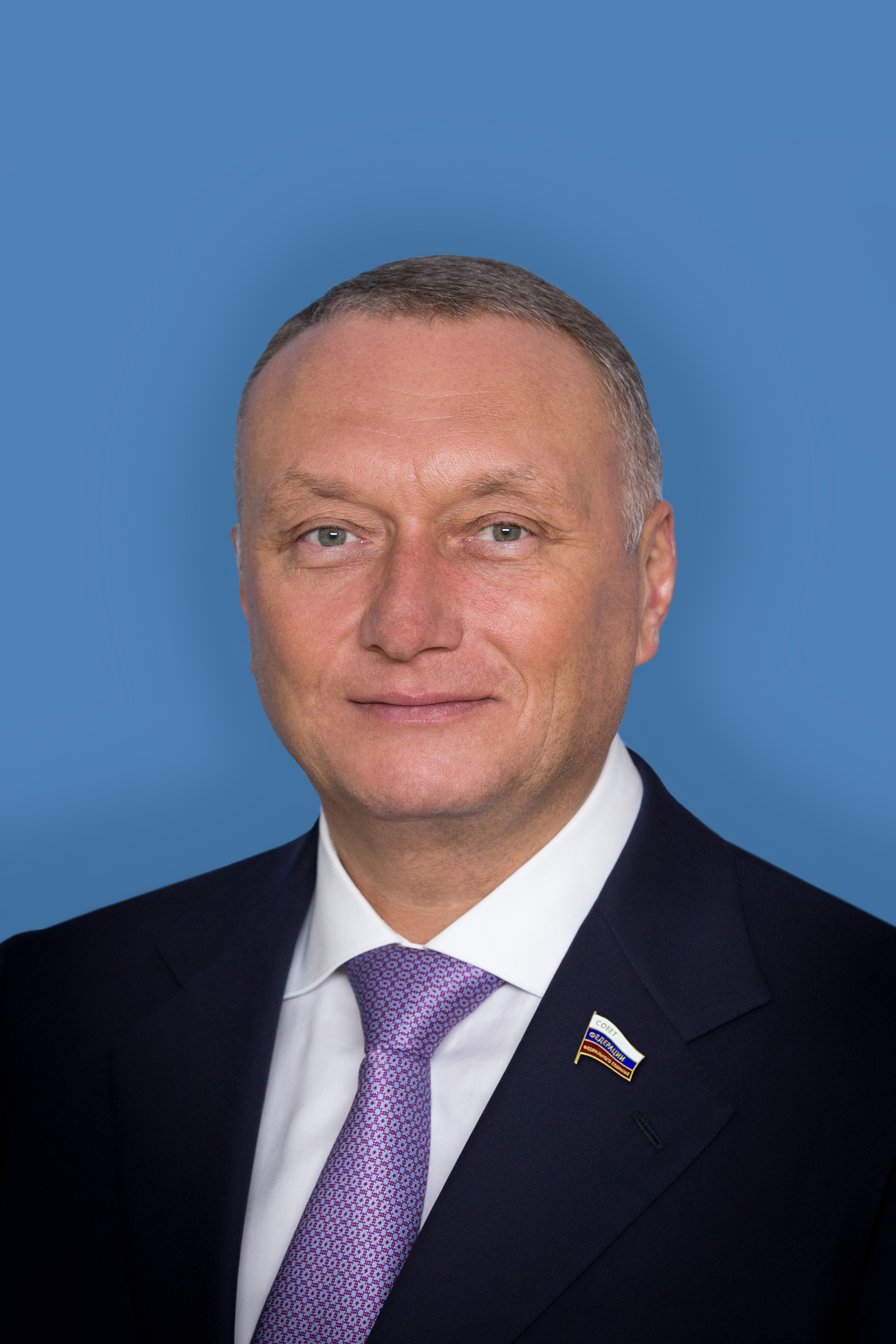

Russian Federation Senator from Tula Oblast
- Incumbent
- Assumed office 6 October 2016
- Preceded by: Yuliya Veprintseva

Member of the State Duma
- In office 18 January 2000 – 5 October 2016

Personal details
- Born: 3 August 1968 (age 58) Gorky, Russian Soviet Federative Socialist Republic, USSR
- Party: United Russia
- Education: Russian Presidential Academy of National Economy and Public Administration, N. I. Lobachevsky State University of Nizhny Novgorod

Dmitry Savelyev (Russian: Дмитрий Владимирович Савельев; born 3 August 1968, Gorky) is a Russian former politician who served as the deputy of the 3rd, 4th, 5th, and 6th State Dumas.

Savelyev served in the Soviet–Afghan War. After that, he worked as general manager of the Lukoil Ufa. From 1996–1997, he was the vice president of the Norse Oil OJSC. On 29 March 1998, he was elected deputy of the Legislative Assembly of Nizhny Novgorod Oblast of the 2nd convocation. From 1998 to 1999, he was the president of the Transneft. In 1999, he was elected deputy of the 3rd State Duma from the Nizhny Novgorod Oblast constituency. In 2003, 2007, and 2011, he was re-elected for the 4th, 5th, 6th, respectively. In 2016, he became a member of the Federation Council.

In 2021, Savelyev took 38th place in the Forbes ranking of the wealthiest Russian civil servants. He moved up on 47 positions compared to the similar ranking that took place in 2020, where he occupied 85th place.

In August 2024, Savelyev was arrested on suspicion of ordering the murder of a business associate in 2023. He was suspended from the United Russia party. Following a jury conviction, he was sentenced in April 2026 to 10 years' imprisonment by a court in Moscow.

== Sanctions ==
He was sanctioned by the British government in 2022 in relation to the Russo-Ukrainian War.

== Awards ==
- Order of Alexander Nevsky
- Order of Honour (Russia)
- Medal "For Courage" (Russia)
- Order "For Merit to the Fatherland"
