= Vladimir Gruzdev =

Russian politician

- Владимир Груздев
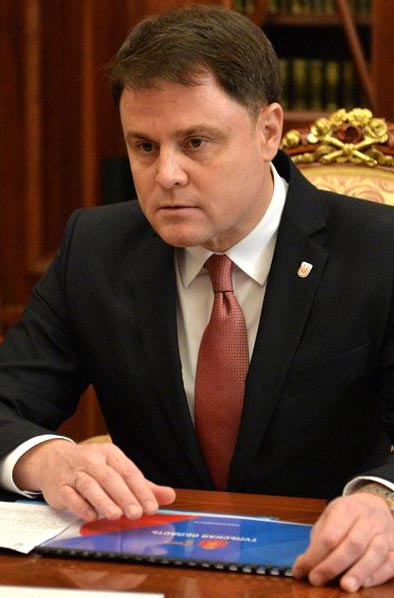
- Gruzdev in 2015

4th Governor of Tula Oblast
- In office 18 August 2011 – 2 February 2016; Acting: 29 June 2011 – 18 August 2011
- Preceded by: Vyacheslav Dudka
- Succeeded by: Alexey Dyumin

Personal details
- Born: February 6, 1967 (age 59) Bolshevo, Russian SFSR, Soviet Union
- Party: United Russia

Vladimir Sergeyevich Gruzdev (Russian: Владимир Серге́евич Груздев; born 6 February 1967) is a Russian entrepreneur and a politician. He was a deputy of the State Duma (2003-2011) and governor of the Tula Oblast (2011-2016). Since December 2016 - Chairman of the Board of the Association of Lawyers of Russia.

Since 2005, he has been included in the rating of the richest businessmen in Russia according to the Russian magazine Forbes. As of 2021, he was ranked 133rd in the ranking with a fortune of 0.9 billion dollars.

== Biography ==
=== Education and military service ===
Vladimir Gruzdev was born on February 6, 1967, in the village of Bolshevo, Moscow region. In 1984 he graduated from the Moscow Suvorov Military School and entered the Military Red Banner Institute.

While studying at the Military Red Banner Institute, Vladimir Gruzdev was sent to work as a military Interpreter in Angola and Mozambique. In 1989, for the courage shown in fulfilling his military duty, he was awarded the Medal "For Battle Merit", the diploma of the Presidium of the Supreme Soviet of the USSR "Warrior-Internationalist".

In 1991 he graduated with honors from the Military Red Banner Institute as an interpreter-referent in Portuguese and English. In addition to these two languages, he speaks Spanish.

From 1991 to 1993 he served in the Foreign Intelligence Service.

Later, in 2000, he graduated from the Faculty of Law of Moscow State University, majoring in Legal studies.

=== Entrepreneurship ===
In 1993, after making the decision to resign from the Russian Foreign Intelligence Service, he decided to engage in entrepreneurship. As Deputy General Director, he gained experience working with retail chain stores in the "OLBI-Diplomat" company.

This year Vladimir also has attracted investments. Together with his partners he established the trading company "The Seventh Continent", where he worked at executive positions from 1994 to 2001. In 1994-1996, Gruzdev was Chairman of the Board of Directors, in 1996-1997 — First Deputy Chairman of the Board of Directors, and in 1997 — Chairman.

In 2007, Gruzdev sold his stake in "The Seventh Continent" to partner Alexander Zanadvorov for about $1 billion, explaining that political career was the priority for him.

In 2005 he entered the Russian rating of Forbes magazine with net worth of 0.34 billion dollars (89th place) for the first time. In 2014, his fortune reached a peak of $1.3 billion, which allowed Gruzdev to take 79th place in the ranking. As of 2021, he occupied the 133rd place in the Russian rating of Forbes magazine with a fortune of 0.9 billion dollars.

=== Political activity ===
==== Moscow City Duma ====
In 2001, Vladimir Gruzdev won the election to the Moscow City Duma in the 27th district, gaining 53.17% of the vote.

During the period of work in the city parliament, he managed the working group on the personnel policy of the courts of Moscow. He was a member of several commissions of the Duma: budget and financial, legislative and security, entrepreneurship, education, as well as a joint commission of the Moscow City Duma and the Moscow Government on the regulatory basis of land and property relations.

==== The State Duma ====
In December 2003, Vladimir Gruzdev was elected a deputy of the State Duma of the IV convocation for the Chertanovo single-mandate constituency, having received at the elections 149,069 (53.3%) votes.

Gruzdev was a member of the Presidium of the Moscow city regional branch of the party "United Russia" and a member of the bureau of the Supreme Council of the party till 2016.

In December 2007 he was elected to the 5th State Duma from Moscow. He was the first deputy chairman of the State Duma Committee on Civil, Criminal, Arbitration and Procedural Legislation.

In September 2011, Vladimir Gruzdev was included number two (after Boris Gryzlov) into the list of candidates from "United Russia" in the Tula region. On December 4, 2011, elections to the 6th State Duma took place, as a result "United Russia" received 61% of the vote in the Tula region. Gruzdev refused the deputy's mandate.

==== Governor of the Tula region ====
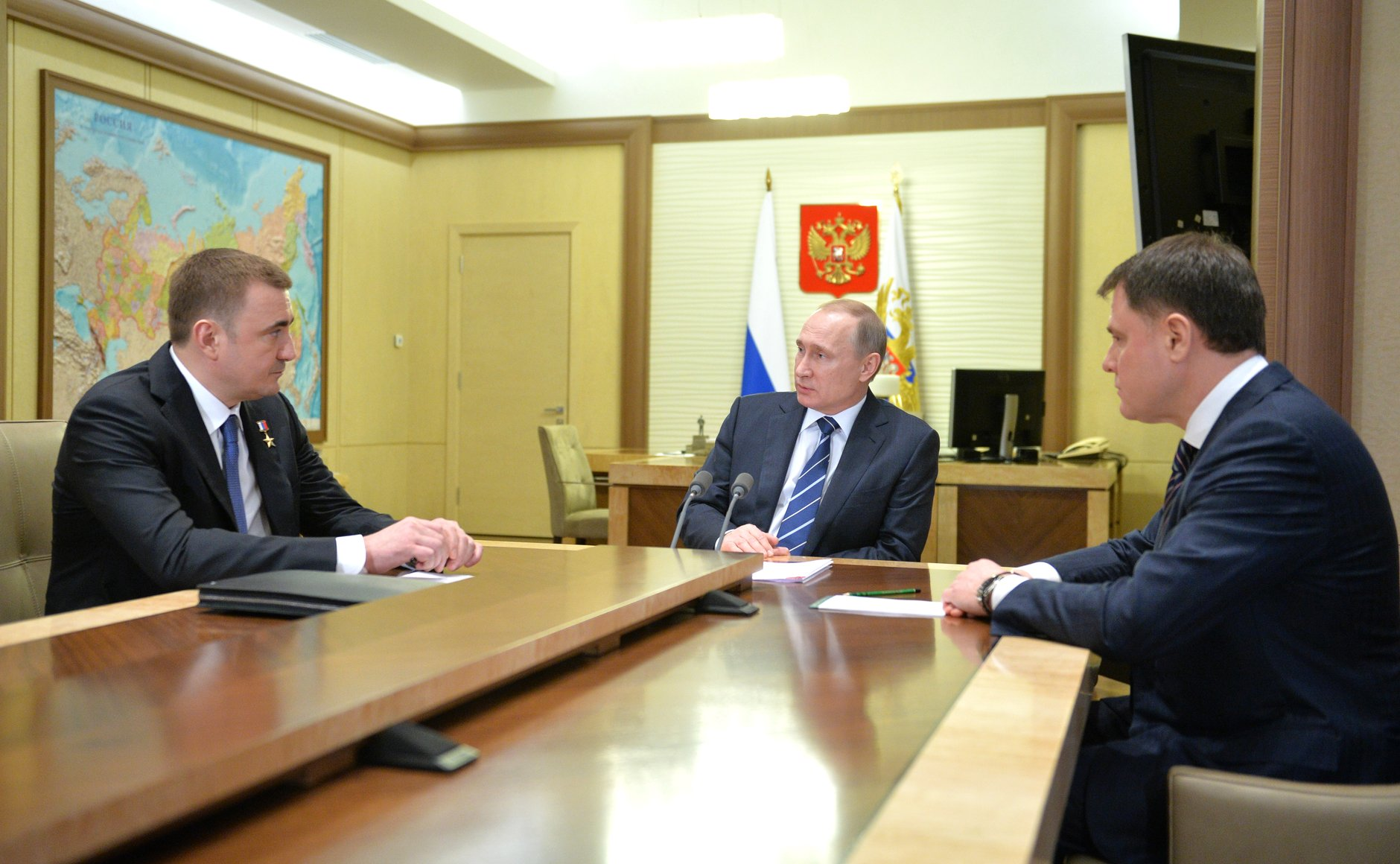
Vladimir Putin, Alexey Dyumin, Vladimir Gruzdev. February 2, 2016

On July 29, 2011, he was appointed as interim acting governor of the Tula region, replacing Vyacheslav Dudka. On August 11, 2011, Russian President Dmitry Medvedev submitted Vladimir Gruzdev's candidacy for the governor's position to the Tula Regional Duma. On August 18, 2011, the official ceremony of Vladimir Gruzdev's inauguration was held in the Tula Kremlin.

On February 2, 2016, after working for almost 5 years, he resigned at his own request due to family circumstances. Alexey Dyumin was appointed interim acting governor of the region, who was subsequently elected governor.

== Social activity ==
In summer of 2007, Vladimir Gruzdev participated in the expedition of the scientific vessel " Academician Fedorov" to the North Pole. During the expedition, Gruzdev, together with Anatoly Sagalevich and Artur Chilingarov, dived to the North Pole on the Mir-1 bathyscaphe and installed on the seabed the titanium flag of Russia and a capsule with a "message to future generations" at a depth of 4261 meters. It was the first dive to the bottom of the Arctic Ocean in world history.

In 2007, Vladimir Gruzdev was elected Chairman of the Association of Young Entrepreneurs of Russia.

During his service as a governor, from 2011 till 2016, Gruzdev donated money for the restoration of one of the bells for the bell tower of the Assumption Cathedral of the Tula Kremlin, he also personally spent 250 million rubles on charity annually in the Tula region, and transferred his entire salary to Yasnaya Polyana children's home. Since December 2012 the governor's salary in the amount of 48,115 rubles was transferred to the fund of the Tula Kremlin and for the organization of disabled people. The press department of the governor announced the transfer of his entire salary to charity throughout 2013.

=== The Association of Lawyers of Russia ===
On December 3, 2016, the congress of the Association of Lawyers of Russia unanimously elected Vladimir Gruzdev to be the chairman of the board.

In March and April 2017, Gruzdev held meetings with the Minister of Culture Vladimir Medinsky (cooperation between the Association and the Russian Military Historical Society was discussed) and Prime Minister Dmitry Medvedev.

On April 21, 2017, Vladimir Gruzdev joined the government commission on legislative drafting activities.

Under the leadership of V. Gruzdev, the Association of Lawyers of Russia monitors the current legislation. While interviewed by Rossiyskaya Gazeta, Vladimir Gruzdev says that the ALRF is preparing large proposals on introducing criteria for calculating compensation for moral harm. Later, the Commission on Determining Amounts of Compensation for Moral Harm has been established under the ALRF.

During his speech at the II Stolypin Forum, V. Gruzdev suggested creating a working group on preparing new drafts of Criminal Code and Code of Criminal Procedure of the Russian Federation.

In order to improve the legal culture and literacy of the Russian population, the ALRF jointly with its partners has held the All-Russian Legal Dictation since 2017. About 55 thousand people took part in the first Dictation. In 2018, the second Dictation was joined by 165 thousand participants. And in 2021, there were already more than 975 thousand participants at the fifth Dictation - Russians and compatriots from 175 countries.

“URA.RU” media in its interview dedicated to the 25th anniversary of the Russian Constitution, named V. Gruzdev as the main lawyer of the country.

Since 2017 Mr. Gruzdev is Co-Chairman of the Centre for Public Procedures “Business Against Corruption”, founded particularly by the non-governmental organisation “Delovaya Rossia” under the Government Order of the Russian Federation.

In 2017, the Association of Lawyers of Russia held the IV BRICS Legal Forum in Moscow, where Mr. Gruzdev initiated the discussion on developing new arbitration institutions of the BRICS countries, legal regulation of the digital economy and others.

In 2018-2019, Mr. Gruzdev moderated sessions on the competitiveness of the national jurisdiction in the framework of the Saint-Petersburg Economic Forum and Eastern Economic Forum.

Vladimir Gruzdev is also co-author of a number of publications on factors affecting the quality of the Russian legal system, as well as initiator of a public discussion of amendments to the legislation.

== Scientific activity ==
In 2003, Gruzdev defended his thesis on "Legal status of civil servants of the Russian Federation and organizational and legal bases for the functioning of the system of training, retraining and advanced training" at the Department of Administrative Law of the Moscow University of the Ministry of Internal Affairs. In 2013, the Dissernet community found that the whole content of the work was plagiarism: 168 of 182 pages were entirely copied from the original work of Pavel Vostrikov "Organizational and legal problems of training, retraining and upgrading of civil servants", defended in 1998. Despite this, the academic degree of Vladimir Gruzdev was confirmed, as more than three years had passed since the defense of the thesis before the discovery of plagiarism.

In 2021, he defended his doctoral dissertation at the Institute of State and Law of the Russian Academy of Sciences on the topic "Realism in Jurisprudence: theoretical, methodological and historical aspects", he was awarded the degree of Doctor of Law.

== Estimates of fortune ==
Gruzdev has been regularly included in the rating of the magazine Forbes since 2005, with the exception of 2008. For the whole period of being in the top positions were varied: the highest position was in 2009 – 36th place, and the lowest – 149 place in 2019.

The largest fortune was achieved in 2014 – $1.3 billion, which allowed the businessman to take 79th place in the ranking of the richest businessmen in Russia at that time. The following year, 2015, the businessman rose to 69th place in the ranking, although his fortune decreased by $100 million.

In 2012, he took the first place in the ranking of the richest Russian officials with an income of 3.89 billion rubles. From the declaration which Gruzdev submitted in 2011 as an official, it is known that he had deposits in banks amounting to 9.4 billion rubles. He also owned shares in OJSC Bank Saint Petersburg, OJSC VTB Bank and Gazprom.

In November 2016, a villa in Sardinia estimated at 25 million euros was purchased in the name of Gruzdev's wife.

In 2012 and 2013, Vladimir Gruzdev took 1,153 and 1,342 places, respectively, in the world ranking of the richest people according to Forbes magazine.

== Awards, promotions ==
- Order "For Merit to the Fatherland" III degree (January 9, 2008) - for courage shown in extreme conditions during the High-latitude Arctic deep-sea expedition
- Order "For Merit to the Fatherland" IV degree (February 2, 2013) - for many years of conscientious work and great charity activities
- Order of Alexander Nevsky (January 30? 2017)
- Medal of the Order "For Merit to the Fatherland", II Degree (March 21, 2007) - for merits in strengthening the rule of law, protecting the rights and legitimate interests of citizens, long-term conscientious work
- Medal "For Battle Merit" (1989)
- Honorary title "Warrior-Internationalist"
- Medal of Merit (FSSP) (October 22, 2013)

Commendations from the President and Government of the Russian Federation

- Russian Federation Presidential Certificate of Honour (July 30, 2010) - for his services in lawmaking and long-term conscientious work
- Gratitude of the President of the Russian Federation (May 6, 2008) - for the great contribution to the work of the Public Reception Office of the candidate for the post of President of the Russian Federation
- Honorary Diploma of the Government of the Russian Federation (July 6, 2011) - for his services in lawmaking and long-term conscientious work
- Acknowledgment of the Government of the Russian Federation (July 22, 2009) - for his services in lawmaking and long-term conscientious work
- Acknowledgment of the Government of the Russian Federation (June 9, 2015) - for the effective organization of work to prepare citizens of the Russian Federation for military service in the Armed Forces of the Russian Federation
- Medal of P.A. Stolypin, II degree (August 31, 2013) - for merits in solving strategic tasks of the country's socio-economic development and long-term conscientious work
- The Honorary Badge of the State Duma of the Federal Assembly of the Russian Federation "For Merits in the Development of Parliamentarism" (June 3, 2009)
- Honorary Badge of the Council of Federation of the Federal Assembly of the Russian Federation "For Merits in the Development of Parliamentarism" (November 26, 2013)
- Pennant of the Minister of Defense of the Russian Federation (June 30, 2015) - for his assistance in solving the tasks assigned to the Armed Forces of the Russian Federation and the first place taken by the Tula Region in the contest among the regions of the Russian Federation for the best training of Russian citizens for military service, Organization and conduct of the conscription of citizens for military service in 2014
- Gratitude of the President of the Russian Federation (May, 2019) – for active participation of the ALRF in preparing and holding events dedicated to the 75th anniversary of the liberation of Velikiy Novgorod from Nazi occupants during the Great Patriotic War 1941-1945.

== Family ==
Father, Sergei Gruzdev, is a professional military officer, mother, Nelly Gruzdev is a teacher of chemistry and biology in high school.

Wife - Olga Gruzdeva. Four children: daughters Arina and Maria, sons Grigory and Leonid.

Government offices
Preceded by Vyacheslav Dudka	Governor of Tula Oblast; 2011-2016	Succeeded by Alexey Dyumin
