= Aleksey Dyumin =

Russian lieutenant general and politician (born 1972)

Hero of the Russian Federation Aleksey Dyumin
- Алексей Дюмин
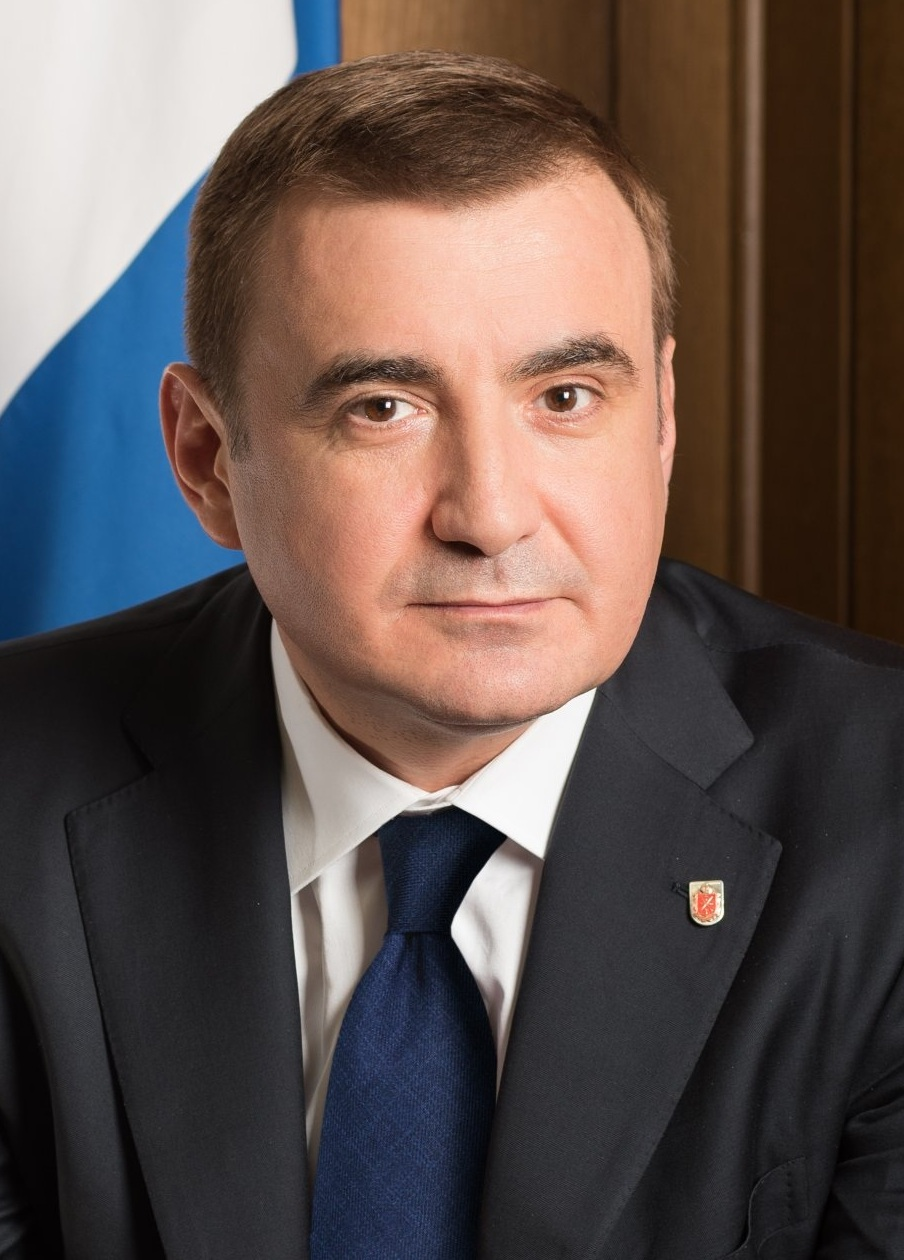
- Official portrait, 2018

Secretary of the State Council
- Incumbent
- Assumed office 29 May 2024
- President: Vladimir Putin
- Preceded by: Igor Levitin

Aide to the President of Russia
- Incumbent
- Assumed office 14 May 2024
- President: Vladimir Putin

5th Governor of Tula Oblast
- In office 22 September 2016 – 14 May 2024
- Preceded by: Vladimir Gruzdev
- Succeeded by: Dmitry Milyaev

Deputy Minister of Defense
- In office 24 December 2015 – 2 February 2016
- Minister: Sergey Shoigu
- Succeeded by: Timur Ivanov

Personal details
- Born: 28 August 1972 (age 54) Kursk, Soviet Union
- Party: United Russia
- Spouse: Olga Dyumina
- Education: Voronezh Higher Military Engineering School of Radio Electronics; Russian Presidential Academy of National Economy and Public Administration; Military Academy of the General Staff of the Armed Forces of Russia
- Profession: military officer, politician
- Awards

Military service
- Allegiance: Russia
- Branch/service: Russian Ground Forces
- Years of service: 1994–2016
- Rank: Colonel General
- Commands: Special Operations Forces
- Battles/wars: Russo-Ukrainian War; Annexation of Crimea

Aleksey Gennadyevich Dyumin (Russian: Алексей Геннадьевич Дюмин; born 28 August 1972) is a Russian politician serving as Secretary of the State Council since 2024. Previously, he served as the chief security guard and assistant of Russian president Vladimir Putin before being promoted to lead the Russian military's Special Operations Forces, where he oversaw the annexation of Crimea in 2014. The following year, he became Deputy Minister of Defense. From 2016 to 2024, he served as the Governor of Tula Oblast. He holds the rank of lieutenant general and was awarded the title of Hero of the Russian Federation.

== Early life and education ==
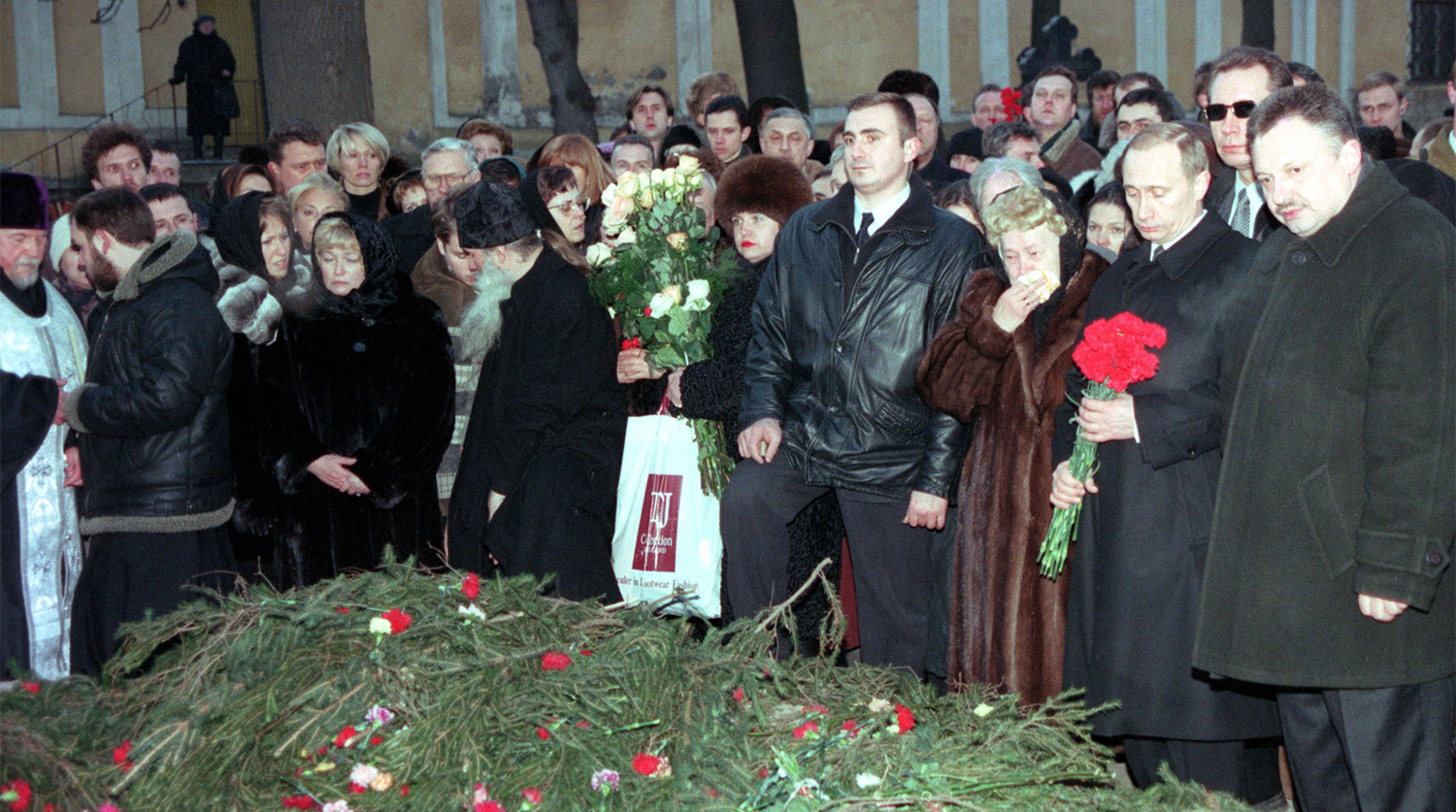
Dyumin and Viktor Zolotov as Putin's bodyguards at the funeral of Putin's mentor Anatoly Sobchak in St. Petersburg on 24 February 2000

Aleksey Dyumin was born August 28, 1972, in Kursk. His father, Gennady Vasilyevich Dyumin, is a military medic and general, who heads the 4th Department of the Main Military Medical Department of the Ministry of Defence. As a child, Dyumin's family lived in both Kaluga and Voronezh as a result of his father's military transferrals. His mother worked as a teacher.

In 1994, he graduated from Voronezh Higher Military Engineering School of Radio Electronics. The school was a part of the Moscow Military District, which was engaged in countering enemy reconnaissance efforts. In 2009 he graduated with honors PhD in Pollical Science from the Russian Presidential Academy of National Economy and Public Administration, defending his dissertation on "Political Aspects of Global Governance within the Framework of G8 Cooperation." In 2013, he completed professional retraining at the Military Academy of the General Staff of the Armed Forces of the Russian Federation.

== Career ==
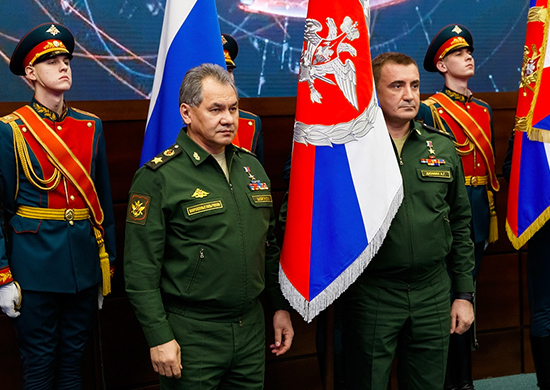
Defence Minister Sergei Shoigu and Aleksey Dyumin on 29 January 2016

In 1995, he served in the Russian Federal Security Service, followed by the Federal Protective Service. In August 1999 he started working as a personal bodyguard of Vladimir Putin. In 2007, Dyumin became head of security of Prime Minister Viktor Zubkov. In 2012, Dyumin became the deputy head of the Presidential Security Service.

=== Deputy chief GRU ===
In 2014 Dyumin became the deputy chief of the GRU, Russian special operations forces, which has played a key role in the Russian annexation of Crimea. According to the newspaper "Kommersant", Dyumin orchestrated the evacuation of Ukrainian President Viktor Yanukovych on February 23, 2014. Dyumin personally declined to comment on it and called all speculation as "myths".

In 2015 Dyumin has served as Chief of the Main Staff and First Deputy Commander-in-Chief of the Russian Ground Forces.

On December 11, 2015, Dyumin was promoted to Lieutenant General. On December 24, 2015, by decree of President Vladimir Putin, Dyumin was appointed Deputy of Defense Minister of Russia Sergey Shoigu.

=== Governor of Tula Oblast (2016–2024) ===
==== Election ====
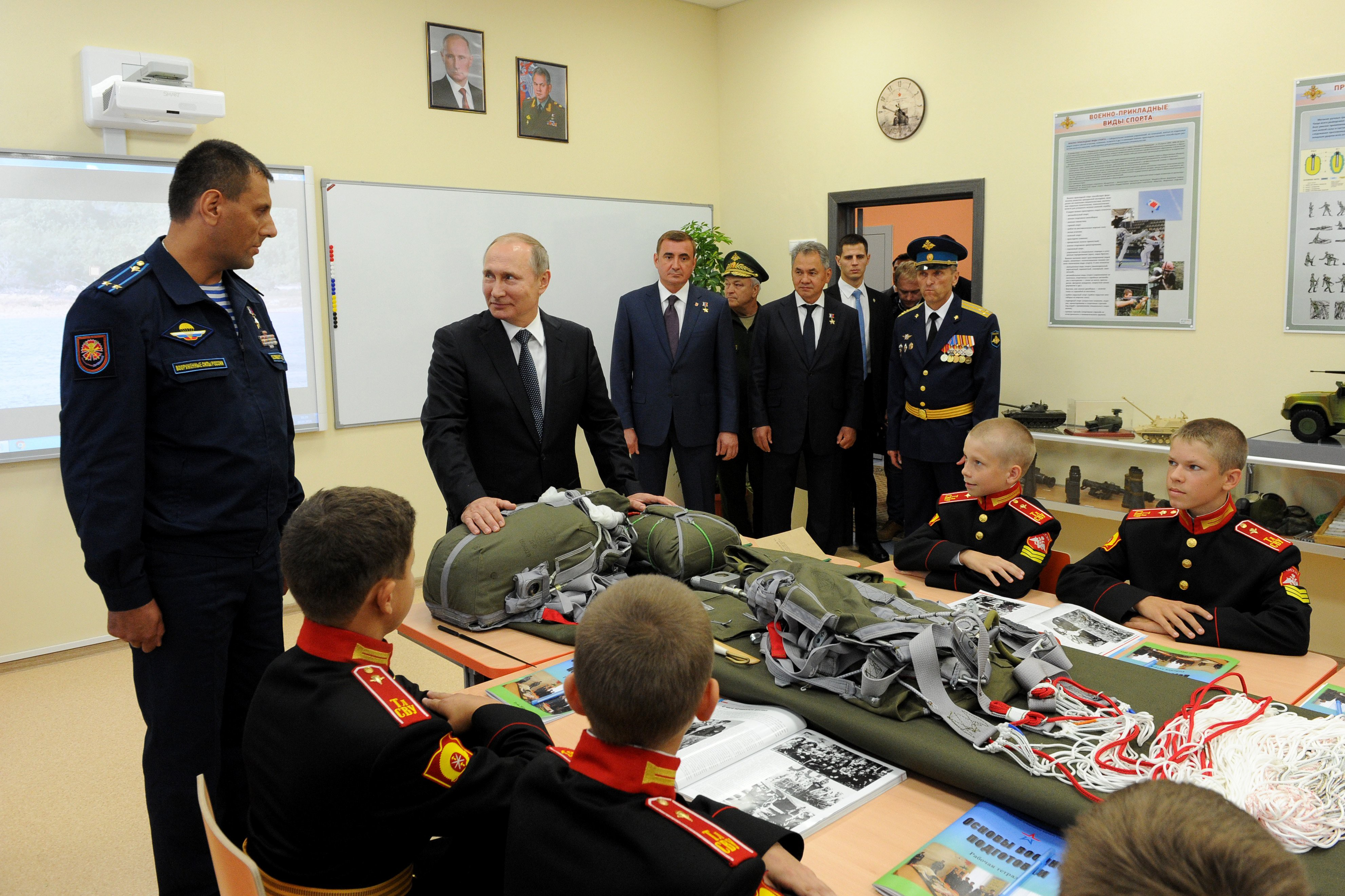
Dyumin, Shoigu, Putin and Seliverstov at the military school in Tula on 8 September 2016

On February 2, 2016, President Vladimir Putin appointed Dyumin as Acting Governor of Tula Oblast. He succeeded Vladimir Gruzdev, who left the post at his own request. Dyumin assumed the duties of Governor of Tula Oblast on February 4, 2016. For Dyumin, the appointment was a surprise.

On February 9, 2016, Dyumin announced plans to participate in the gubernatorial election, which was held on September 18, 2016. He decided to run for governor as an independent candidate, but he was supported by United Russia and the far-right Liberal Democratic Party. Tula Oblast was the only region in 2016 where United Russia did not hold a primary for the selection of a candidate for governor.

Dyumin won the election with a reported 84.17% of the vote. Dyumin took office as governor on 22 September 2016.

==== Governorship ====
On 29 November 2017, at the III Congress of Railway Workers, Dyumin announced the planned construction of a high–speed railway between Moscow and Tula as part of the high–speed railway "South" (Moscow — Rostov on Don — Adler). Since 2017, according to Dyumin, preparatory work has been launched with the participation of Russian Railways, the President and the Prime Minister. Upon completion of the high speed rail link, the time required to cover the 194 km distance between Moscow and Tula will decrease from the current two hours to only 55 minutes.

In 2018, Dyumin was listed as the sixth most-powerful governor in Russia. He was reelected as an Independent candidate for Governor on 19 September 2021 with 83.58% of the vote. In 2021 Dyumin was promoted to the rank of Colonel General. Following the Wagner rebellion, Russian media began discussing the possibility of Dyumin replacing controversial defense minister Sergei Shoigu, one of the targets of the uprising. Dyumin is also said to have been a member of the negotiations for Yevgeny Prigozhin during the rebellion.

=== Promotions in 2024 ===
In May 2024, Putin appointed Dyumin as Aide to the President of Russia overseeing he military-industrial complex, sports, and the advisory State Council as Secretary. On 30 September 2024, Putin appointed him to the Security Council of Russia. He has been a member of the Supervisory Boards of state-owned conglomerates including Rostec since May 2024, Roscosmos since March 2025, and the Agency for Strategic Initiatives (ASI) since February 2026.

== Personal life ==
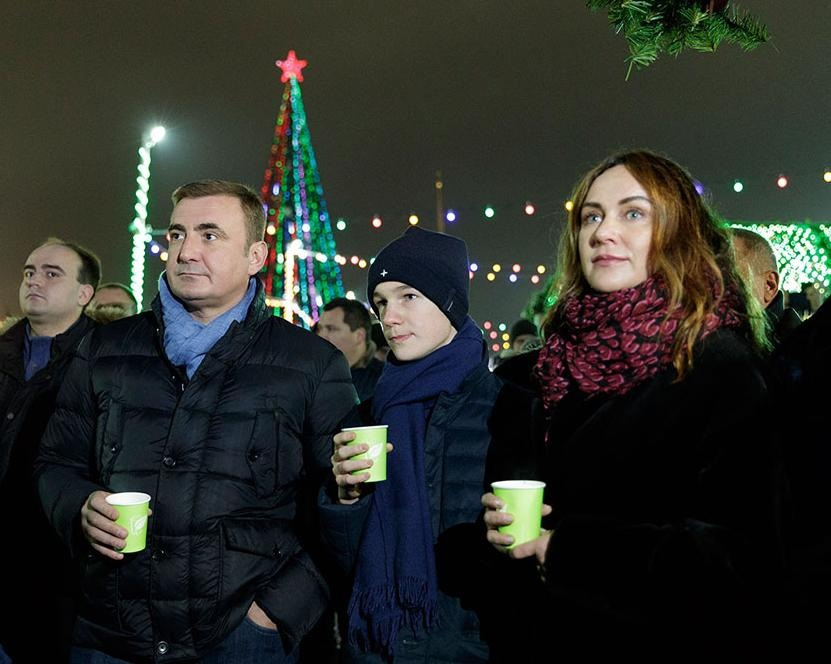
Dyumin with family on 31 December 2017

Dyumin is married. His wife Olga was born on 8 January 1977 in Moscow. He has a son, Nikita, who is studying at school. His younger brother, Artyom, is a businessman who heads JSC TPK "Prodmarket" as well as LLC "Turbo."

Dyumin has been interested in hockey since early school years and played as a goalkeeper on the school team. As an adviser included in the management of the hockey club SKA Saint Petersburg. In October 2011, together with Roman Rotenberg and Gennady Timchenko, he participated in a charity friendly hockey match for the SKA Legends team. On 7 October 2015, Dyumin participated in the Night Hockey League match, which took place in Sochi and was dedicated to the birthday of Russian President Vladimir Putin.

According to Dyumin, he once saved Putin from a bear attack.

=== Sanctions ===
In April 2018, the United States imposed sanctions on him and 23 other Russian nationals. Dyumin was also personally sanctioned by the British government in 2023 following the Russian invasion of Ukraine.

== Family ==
Aleksey Dyumin with his son and wife

He is married and has a son. His wife, Olga, was born on 8 January 1977 in Moscow. Dyumin met her during a walk at VDNKh, and in the late 1990s they married. Olga Dyumina has an education in economics and speaks foreign languages. She is engaged in sports, particularly running: she participates in marathons and runs both long and short distances. She also takes part in charity runs of 5–7 kilometers. His younger brother, Artyom Dyumin, is the former general director of the Olimpiyskiy Sports Complex and an investor in the construction of a luxury residential complex in the center of Moscow.

== Awards ==
- Hero of the Russian Federation (2014)
- Decoration "For Service in Military Intelligence"
- Order "For Merit to the Fatherland" 3rd Degree (2022)
- Order "For Merit to the Fatherland" 4th Degree with Swords
- Order of Courage (Russia)
- Medal of the Order "For Merit to the Fatherland" 1st Degree, 2nd Degree (2012)
- Order of Alexander Nevsky (2017)
- Order of Suvorov (2008)
- Medal "In Commemoration of the 1000th Anniversary of Kazan"
- Medal "For Military Valour" (FSO)
- Medal "For Distinction in Military Service" (FSO) 1st, 2nd, 3rd Degrees
- Medal "For Military Cooperation"
- Medal "For Cooperation in the Name of Salvation"
- Medal "For the Return of Crimea"
- Medal "For Contribution to Strengthening the Defense of the Russian Federation" (2019)
- Breast badge "Honoured Fellow of the Federal Protective Service"

== See also ==
- List of Heroes of the Russian Federation
