= Oleg Lebedev (politician, born 1976) =

Russian politician (born 1976)

Oleg Lebedev MP
- Олег Лебедев
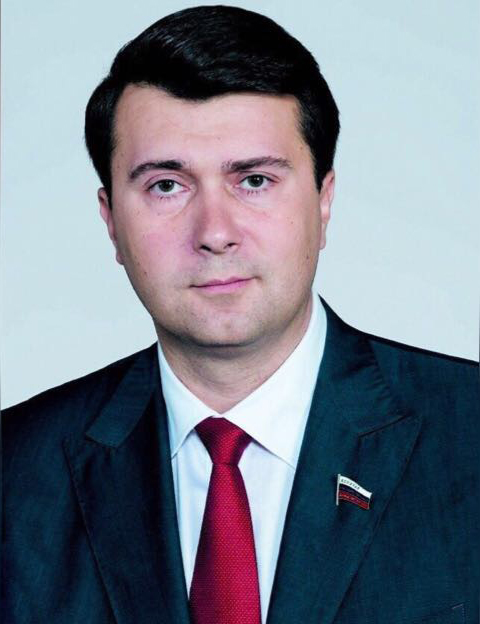

Member of the State Duma (Party List Seat)
- Incumbent
- Assumed office 31 January 2012
- Preceded by: Vasily Starodubtsev

Personal details
- Born: 12 October 1976 (age 50) Tula, RSFSR, USSR
- Party: Communist Party of the Russian Federation
- Education: Tula State University; Russian Academy of Public Administration

Oleg Alexandrovich Lebedev (Russian: Олег Александрович Лебедев; born 12 October 1976, Tula, Russia) is a Russian political figure and a deputy of the 6th, 7th, and 8th State Dumas.

From 1996 to 2000, From 1996 to 2000, he worked at various enterprises in Tula as an economist, manager, deputy director. In 1997, Lebedev joined the Communist Party of the Russian Federation. In 2001, he was elected the first secretary of the Tula branch of the party. In 2014, he headed the branch. On 1 October 2000 he was elected deputy of the Tula Oblast Duma. In 2004 and 2009, he was re-elected for the Tula Oblast Duma of the 4th and 5th convocations, respectively. On 27 January 2012 he received a vacant mandate for the 6th State Duma following the death of Deputy Vasily Starodubtsev. In 2016 and 2021, he was re-elected for the 7th and 8th State Dumas, respectively.

He was sanctioned by the United Kingdom in 2022 in relation to activities of Russia in Ukraine.

== Legislative Activity ==
From 2011 to 2019, during his tenure as a deputy of the State Duma of the VI and VII convocations, he co-authored 50 legislative initiatives and amendments to federal draft laws.

In the spring of 2016, the deputy headed a working group to finalize the law "On the Responsible Treatment of Animals," which had been adopted in its first reading by the State Duma of the Russian Federation five years earlier. Lebedev stated that he personally removed all provisions related to the euthanasia of stray dogs from the draft law. The new version would prohibit the capture of stray animals for the purpose of euthanasia, and its core principle would be the TNR program (Trap–Neuter–Return), allowing stray dogs to remain freely on city streets.

A similar program had been implemented experimentally in Moscow from 1999 to 2008, but it drew criticism from scientists, led to the killing of endangered species by free-roaming dogs, and was eventually terminated after a series of scandals, including allegations of embezzlement. It was replaced with a policy of non-return capture.

In May of the same year, Lebedev proposed the introduction of the position of Animal Rights Commissioner in Russia.
