= 2024 Astrakhan Oblast gubernatorial election =

- 6–8 September 2024
- Turnout: 43.55%
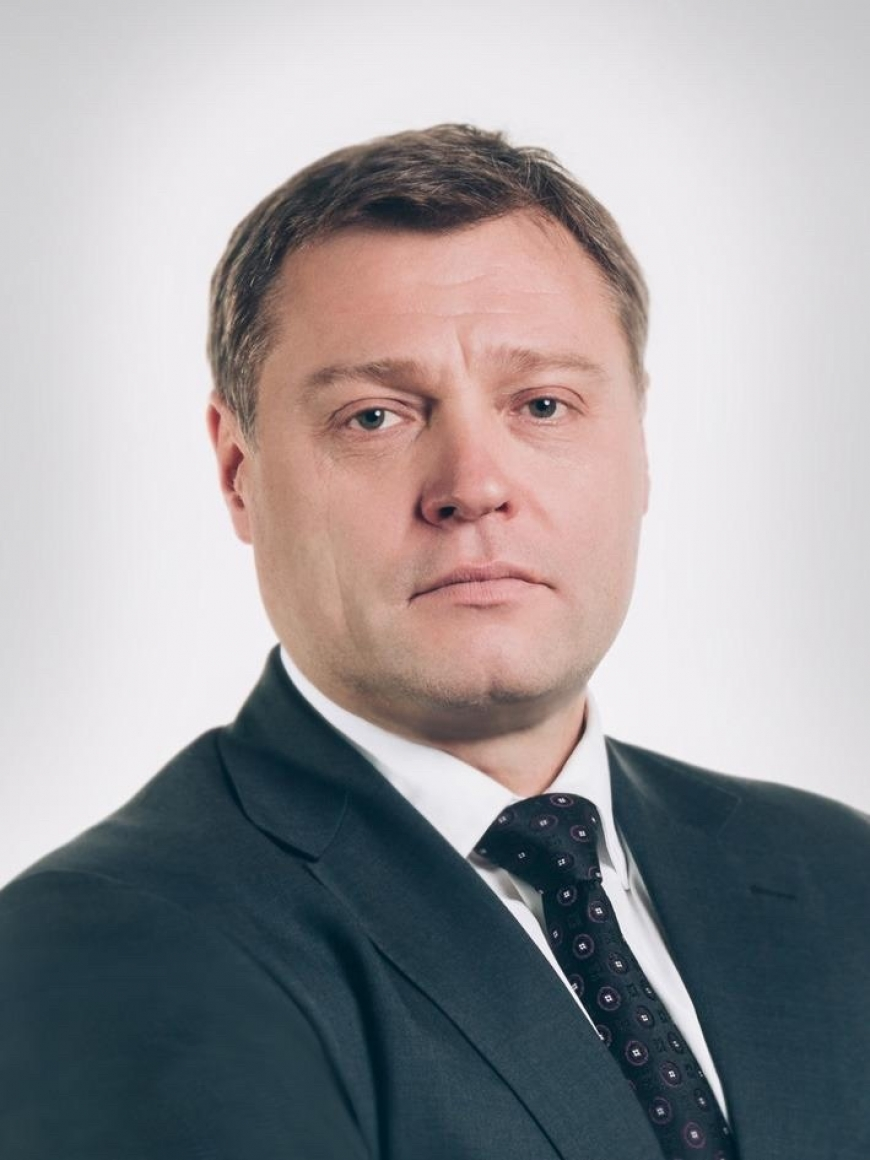
		CPRF	LDPR
Candidate	Igor Babushkin	Sergey Sevastyanov	Timofey Shcherbakov
Party	United Russia	CPRF	LDPR
Popular vote	241,585	24,132	18,952
Percentage	78.17%	7.81%	6.13%
Governor before election
Igor Babushkin
Independent
Governor-elect
Igor Babushkin
United Russia

The 2024 Astrakhan Oblast gubernatorial election took place on 6–8 September 2024, on common election day. Incumbent Governor Igor Babushkin was re-elected to a second term in office.

== Background ==
Deputy Presidential Envoy to the North Caucasian Federal District Igor Babushkin was appointed acting Governor of Astrakhan Oblast on 5 June 2019, replacing previous acting Governor Sergey Morozov. Morozov unexpectedly asked for resignation just eight months after his appointment in September 2018, and prior to the dismissal was viewed as a favourite to win the upcoming gubernatorial elections. Despite the gubernatorial rotation, elections for a full term remained scheduled for September 2019.

Babushkin ran for a full term as an independent and overwhelmingly won the September 2019 election with 75.63% of the vote, defeating his nearest challenger, Communist State Duma member Nikolay Arefyev by 63 points. Despite the convincing margin of victory, the election was initially viewed as competitive until Babushkin's main opponent, A Just Russia State Duma member and former gubernatorial candidate Oleg Shein, failed to qualify as an Independent. During most of his first term Babushkin nominally remained an Independent, joining United Russia only in June 2023 and immediately being elected to lead the regional party office.

In April 2024 during a meeting with President Vladimir Putin Governor Babushkin announced his intention to run for a second term and received Putin's endorsement.

== Candidates ==
In Astrakhan Oblast candidates for Governor can be nominated by registered political parties or by self-nomination. Candidate for Governor of Astrakhan Oblast should be a Russian citizen and at least 30 years old. Candidates for Governor should not have a foreign citizenship or residence permit. Each candidate in order to be registered is required to collect at least 7% of signatures of members and heads of municipalities. In addition, self-nominated candidates should collect 1% of signatures of Astrakhan Oblast residents. Also gubernatorial candidates present 3 candidacies to the Federation Council and election winner later appoints one of the presented candidates.

=== Declared ===
Candidate name, political party		Occupation	Status	Ref.
Igor Babushkin; United Russia	Igor Babushkin	Incumbent Governor of Astrakhan Oblast (2019–present)	Registered	
Vitaly Bakhilin; New People		Businessman	Registered	
Sergey Sevastyanov; Communist Party		First secretary of CPRF regional committee (2024–present)	Registered	
Timofey Shcherbakov; Liberal Democratic Party		Member of Duma of Astrakhan Oblast (2016–present); 2019 gubernatorial candidate	Registered	
Vladimir Sukharev; Rodina		Member of Duma of Astrakhan Oblast (2021–present); Businessman	Registered	
Vladislav Kashin; Independent		Self-employed	Failed to qualify	

=== Candidates for Federation Council ===
Incumbent Senator Alexander Bashkin (United Russia) was not renominated.

Gubernatorial candidate, political party	Candidates for Federation Council	Status
Igor Babushkin; United Russia	* Andrey Derkach, former People's Deputy of Ukraine (1998–2006, 2007–2023) * Viktoria Guryanova, Deputy Chairman of the Government of Astrakhan Oblast (2022–present) * Lilia Ivanova, Deputy Chairwoman of the Astrakhan City Duma (2020–present)	Registered
Vitaly Bakhilin; New People	* Artur Fayzukhanov * Sergey Lampadov, television executive * Daniyar Makhmudov, businessman	Registered
Sergey Sevastyanov; Communist Party	* Nikita Povalyashko, party secretary * Mikhail Stepanov * Tatyana Teteryatnikova, Member of Duma of Astrakhan Oblast (2016–present)	Registered
Timofey Shcherbakov; Liberal Democratic Party	* Dmitry Anufriyev, former Member of Duma of Astrakhan Oblast (2016–2021) * Yevgeny Babushkin, Member of Duma of Astrakhan Oblast (2021–present) * Angelina Kalashnikova, individual entrepreneur	Registered
Vladimir Sukharev; Rodina	* Nurlan Supugaliyev, Member of Council of Volodarsky District (2007–present) * Amir Tanin, businessman * Stanislav Vorokh, Member of Council of Akhtubinsky District (2019–present)	Registered

== Results ==
Summary of the 6–8 September 2024 Astrakhan Oblast gubernatorial election results
Candidate	Party	Votes	%
Igor Babushkin (incumbent)	United Russia	241,585	78.17
Sergey Sevastyanov	Communist Party	24,132	7.81
Timofey Shcherbakov	Liberal Democratic Party	18,952	6.13
Vitaly Bakhilin	New People	12,632	4.09
Vladimir Sukharev	Rodina	7,260	2.35
Valid votes		304,561	98.54
Blank ballots		4,509	1.46
Total		309,070	100.00
Turnout		309,070	43.55
Registered voters		709,760	100.00

Governor Babushkin appointed former People's Deputy of Ukraine Andrey Derkach (Independent) to the Federation Council, replacing incumbent Senator Alexander Bashkin (United Russia).

== See also ==
- 2024 Russian regional elections
