= 2026 Astrakhan Oblast legislative election =

Regional legislative election in Russia

- 18–20 September 2026

All 44 seats in the Duma 23 seats needed for a majority
- Turnout: 55.81% ▲13.31 pp
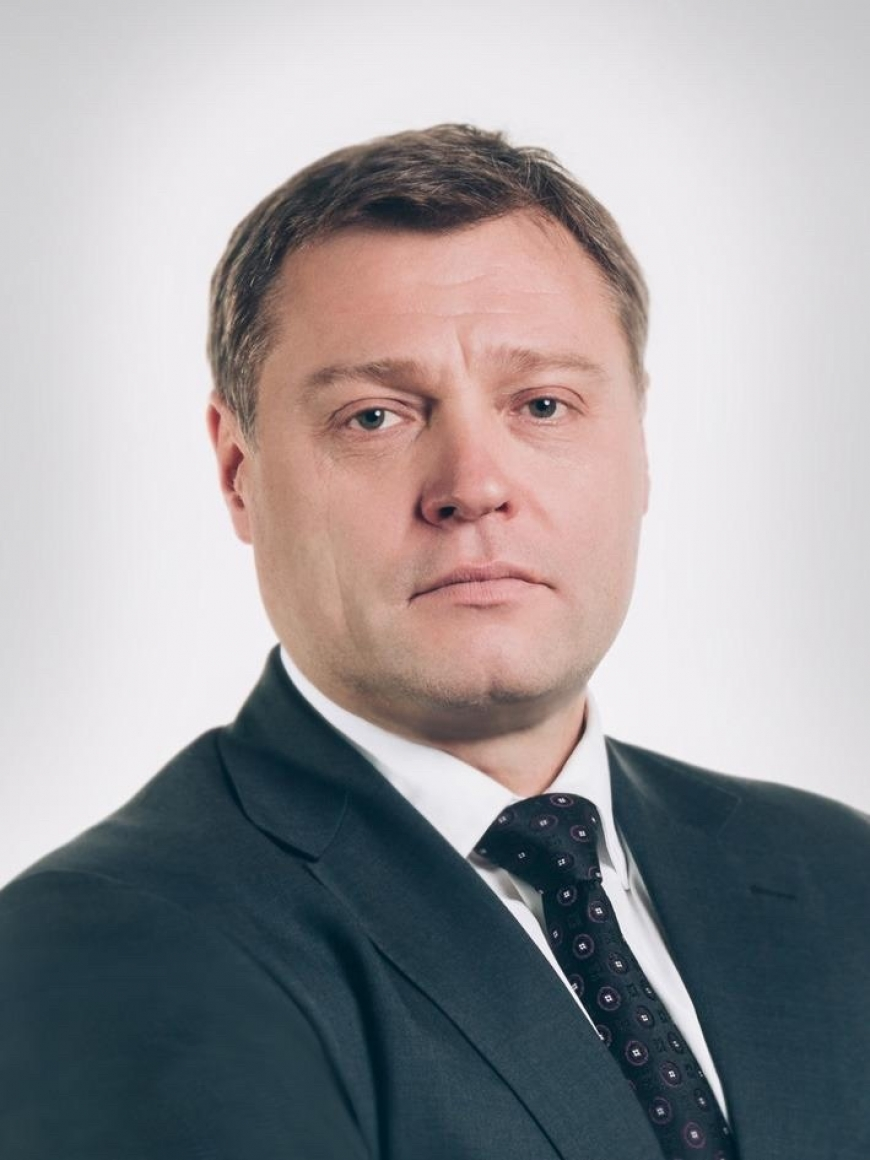
	Majority party	Minority party	Third party
		CPRF	LDPR
Candidate	Igor Babushkin	Sergey Sevastyanov	Timofey Shcherbakov
Party	United Russia	CPRF	LDPR
Last election	46.76%, 27 seats	18.23%, 5 seats	5.25%, 2 seats
Seats won	33	3	3
Seat change	▲6	▼2	▲1
Popular vote	209,227	49,418	48,602
Percentage	53.23%	12.57%	12.36%
Swing	▲6.47 pp	▼5.66 pp	▲7.11 pp
	Fourth party	Fifth party	Sixth party
	NL	SR	RPPSS
Candidate	Sergey Lampadov	Maria Lidzhiyeva	Larisa Samodayeva
Party	New People	A Just Russia	Party of Pensioners
Last election	5.92%, 1 seat	16.28%, 5 seats	3.36%, 2 seats
Seats won	2	1	1
Seat change	▲1	▼4	▼1
Popular vote	33,210	28,836	17,791
Percentage	8.45%	7.34%	4.53%
Swing	▲2.53 pp	▼8.94 pp	▲1.17 pp
Chairman before election
Igor Martynov
United Russia
Elected Chairman
Igor Martynov
United Russia
Senator before election
Gennady Ordenov
United Russia
Senator after election
Aleksandr Khodayev
United Russia

The 2026 Duma of Astrakhan Oblast election took place on 18–20 September 2026, on common election day, coinciding with the 2026 Russian legislative election. All 44 seats in the Duma were up for re-election.

United Russia increased its majority in the Duma, winning 53.2% of the vote and 20 single-mandate constituencies. Communist Party of the Russian Federation lost two seats, while A Just Russia suffered heavy defeat and was reduced to a single seat. Liberal Democratic Party of Russia significantly increased its vote share, winning three seats, and New People doubled its faction to two seats. Russian Party of Pensioners for Social Justice and Rodina retained their representation in the Duma by winning single-mandate constituencies.

== Electoral system ==
Under current election laws, the Duma is elected for a term of five years, with parallel voting. 22 seats are elected by party-list proportional representation with a 5% electoral threshold, with the other half elected in 22 single-member constituencies by first-past-the-post voting. Seats in the proportional part are allocated using the Imperiali quota, modified to ensure that every party list, which passes the threshold, receives at least one mandate.

== Candidates ==
=== Party lists ===
To register regional lists of candidates, parties need to collect 0.5% of signatures of all registered voters in Astrakhan Oblast.

The following parties were relieved from the necessity to collect signatures:

- United Russia
- Communist Party of the Russian Federation
- Liberal Democratic Party of Russia
- A Just Russia
- New People
- Russian Party of Pensioners for Social Justice

№	Party	Oblast-wide list	Candidates	Territorial groups	Status
1	New People	Sergey Lampadov	26	22	Registered
2	Party of Pensioners	Larisa Samodayeva	14	13	Registered
3	Communist Party	Sergey Sevastyanov	36	22	Registered
4	United Russia	Igor Babushkin	67	22	Registered
5	Liberal Democratic Party	Timofey Shcherbakov	64	22	Registered
6	A Just Russia	Maria Lidzhiyeva	22	21	Registered

Rodina, which participated in the last election, did not file its party list and only fielded a candidate in the single-mandate constituency.

=== Single-mandate constituencies ===
22 single-mandate constituencies were formed in Astrakhan Oblast. To register candidates in single-mandate constituencies need to collect 3% of signatures of registered voters in the constituency.

Number of candidates in single-mandate constituencies
Party	Candidates	
Party	Nominated	Registered
United Russia	22	22
Communist Party	22	20
A Just Russia	19	19
New People	21	20
Liberal Democratic Party	22	22
Party of Pensioners	4	4
Rodina	1	1
Total	111	108

== Results ==
=== Results by party lists ===
Summary of the 18–20 September 2026 Duma of Astrakhan Oblast election results
Party	Party list					Constituency		Total	
Party	Votes	%	±pp	Seats	+/–	Seats	+/–	Seats	+/–
United Russia	209,227	53.23	▲6.47	13	▲1	20	▲5	33	▲6
Communist Party	49,418	12.57	▼5.66	3	▼1	0	▼1	3	▼2
Liberal Democratic Party	48,602	12.36	▲7.11	3	▲2	0	▼1	3	▲1
New People	33,210	8.45	▲2.53	2	▲1	0	New	2	▲1
A Just Russia	28,836	7.34	▼8.94	1	▼3	0	▼1	1	▼4
Party of Pensioners	17,791	4.53	▲1.17	0	Steady	1	▼1	1	▼1
Rodina	–	–	–	–	–	1	Steady	1	Steady
Invalid ballots	5,986	1.52	▼0.86	—	—	—	—	—	—
Total	393,070	100.00	—	22	Steady	22	Steady	44	Steady
Turnout	393,070	55.81	▲13.31	—	—	—	—	—	—
Registered voters	704,244	100.00	—	—	—	—	—	—	—

Igor Martynov (United Russia) was re-elected as Chairman of the Duma. Member of the Duma and Lukoil executive Aleksandr Khodayev (United Russia) was appointed to the Federation Council, replacing incumbent Senator Gennady Ordenov (United Russia).

=== Results in single-member constituencies ===
==== District 1 ====
Summary of the 18–20 September 2026 Duma of Astrakhan Oblast election in District 1
Candidate	Party	Votes	%
Aleksey Bobrov	United Russia	9,717	47.96%
Andrey Antonov	Communist Party	5,636	27.82%
Sergey Kolesnikov	A Just Russia	2,009	9.92%
Konstantin Butorin	New People	1,642	8.10%
Olga Tambovtseva	Liberal Democratic Party	1,077	5.32%
Total		20,261	100%

==== District 2 ====
Summary of the 18–20 September 2026 Duma of Astrakhan Oblast election in District 2
Candidate	Party	Votes	%
Sergey Bukin	United Russia	6,582	45.50%
Eduard Glagolev	Party of Pensioners	2,719	18.80%
Aleksandr Skiba	Communist Party	2,180	15.07%
Olesya Smirnova	New People	1,275	8.81%
Anastasia Zhiglova	Liberal Democratic Party	1,184	8.19%
Inessa Kupchinskaya	A Just Russia	525	3.63%
Total		14,465	100%

==== District 3 ====
Summary of the 18–20 September 2026 Duma of Astrakhan Oblast election in District 3
Candidate	Party	Votes	%
Vitaly Gutman	United Russia	6,492	43.47%
Yevgeny Korolevsky	Liberal Democratic Party	4,067	27.23%
Vladimir Bolovin	Communist Party	1,792	12.00%
Olga Kodyakova	New People	1,278	8.56%
Yury Kuznetsov	A Just Russia	1,006	6.74%
Total		14,933	100%

==== District 4 ====
Summary of the 18–20 September 2026 Duma of Astrakhan Oblast election in District 4
Candidate	Party	Votes	%
Andrey Melnichenko (incumbent)	United Russia	9,302	63.14%
Sergey Shalagin	Communist Party	2,065	14.02%
Maksim Gondarev	Liberal Democratic Party	1,769	12.01%
Aleksandra Kirdan	New People	1,147	7.79%
Total		14,733	100%

==== District 5 ====
Summary of the 18–20 September 2026 Duma of Astrakhan Oblast election in District 5
Candidate	Party	Votes	%
Nurlan Supugaliyev (incumbent)	United Russia	12,775	65.33%
Aslan Dzhunusov	Liberal Democratic Party	1,959	10.02%
Konstantin Kvasov	Communist Party	1,813	9.27%
Damir Mukhanov	A Just Russia	1,309	6.69%
Rizana Kushkinbayeva	New People	1,161	5.94%
Total		19,555	100%

==== District 6 ====
Summary of the 18–20 September 2026 Duma of Astrakhan Oblast election in District 6
Candidate	Party	Votes	%
Maksim Senektutov	United Russia	7,412	34.22%
Guzyal Askharova	Communist Party	6,556	30.27%
Nadezhda Yagupova	New People	3,029	13.98%
Pyotr Zotov	Liberal Democratic Party	2,322	10.72%
Andrey Smetanin	A Just Russia	1,873	8.65%
Total		21,661	100%

==== District 7 ====
Summary of the 18–20 September 2026 Duma of Astrakhan Oblast election in District 7
Candidate	Party	Votes	%
Igor Martynov (incumbent)	United Russia	11,384	67.71%
Nikolay Zhukov	Communist Party	1,529	9.09%
Yevgeny Lomovoy	New People	1,501	8.93%
Nina Vasilenko	Liberal Democratic Party	1,036	6.16%
Yevgeny Kiselev	A Just Russia	1,002	5.96%
Total		16,813	100%

==== District 8 ====
Summary of the 18–20 September 2026 Duma of Astrakhan Oblast election in District 8
Candidate	Party	Votes	%
Nikolay Lyashko	United Russia	8,904	65.13%
Sergey Astakhov	Communist Party	2,227	16.29%
Denis Boyev	A Just Russia	1,968	14.40%
Anna Sokolova	Liberal Democratic Party	280	2.05%
Total		13,671	100%

==== District 9 ====
Summary of the 18–20 September 2026 Duma of Astrakhan Oblast election in District 9
Candidate	Party	Votes	%
Gennady Ordenov	United Russia	11,044	61.24%
Vera Gnucheva	Liberal Democratic Party	3,371	18.69%
Oleg Tvorogov	A Just Russia	2,826	15.67%
Aleksey Reinhardt	New People	462	2.56%
Total		18,034	100%

==== District 10 ====
Summary of the 18–20 September 2026 Duma of Astrakhan Oblast election in District 10
Candidate	Party	Votes	%
Yulia Nesterova (incumbent)	United Russia	5,843	37.25%
Mikhail Stepanov	Communist Party	4,150	26.46%
Yekaterina Kochetova	A Just Russia	2,604	16.60%
Svetlana Koznova	Liberal Democratic Party	1,572	10.02%
Daniyal Utemisov	New People	1,165	7.43%
Total		15,684	100%

==== District 11 ====
Summary of the 18–20 September 2026 Duma of Astrakhan Oblast election in District 11
Candidate	Party	Votes	%
Aleksey Karnaukhov	United Russia	7,620	44.56%
Oksana Derichenko	New People	3,295	19.27%
Aleksandr Zhmurov	A Just Russia	3,263	19.08%
Valery Verenkov	Communist Party	2,242	13.11%
Vladimir Gnativ	Liberal Democratic Party	341	1.99%
Total		17,099	100%

==== District 12 ====
Summary of the 18–20 September 2026 Duma of Astrakhan Oblast election in District 12
Candidate	Party	Votes	%
Yevgeny Apostolov (incumbent)	United Russia	6,159	27.72%
Azamat Makashev	Liberal Democratic Party	4,380	19.71%
Sabir Dusabaliyev	Communist Party	4,070	18.32%
Igor Pochernin	New People	4,029	18.13%
Vadim Yefimov	A Just Russia	2,162	9.73%
Dina Varlamova	Party of Pensioners	1,134	5.10%
Total		22,217	100%

==== District 13 ====
Summary of the 18–20 September 2026 Duma of Astrakhan Oblast election in District 13
Candidate	Party	Votes	%
Igor Alekseyev	United Russia	10,174	50.88%
Andrey Yashin	Liberal Democratic Party	3,693	18.47%
Galimzhan Bisaliyev	Communist Party	3,178	15.89%
Anastasia Tarapatina	A Just Russia	2,766	13.83%
Total		19,996	100%

==== District 14 ====
Summary of the 18–20 September 2026 Duma of Astrakhan Oblast election in District 14
Candidate	Party	Votes	%
Aleksandr Shumeyko	United Russia	8,586	44.97%
Dmitry Kovzalov	New People	4,564	23.91%
Valery Shamayev	Communist Party	3,310	17.34%
Anatoly Demchenko	Liberal Democratic Party	1,535	8.04%
Oleg Tarapatin	A Just Russia	728	3.81%
Total		19,092	100%

==== District 15 ====
Summary of the 18–20 September 2026 Duma of Astrakhan Oblast election in District 15
Candidate	Party	Votes	%
Larisa Samodayeva (incumbent)	Party of Pensioners	6,800	36.03%
Aleksandra Tsupanko	United Russia	6,528	34.59%
Yekaterina Marandyuk	New People	2,169	11.49%
Natalya Potapova	A Just Russia	1,568	8.31%
Kamil Kugushev	Liberal Democratic Party	1,097	5.81%
Aleksey Gilyazeyev	Communist Party	500	2.65%
Total		18,874	100%

==== District 16 ====
Summary of the 18–20 September 2026 Duma of Astrakhan Oblast election in District 16
Candidate	Party	Votes	%
Sergey Poroysky	United Russia	8,776	44.07%
Yelena Karpukhina	Liberal Democratic Party	4,556	22.88%
Nikolay Mitrofanov	Communist Party	2,706	13.59%
Andrey Bykov	New People	2,651	13.31%
Vladislav Moskalenkov	A Just Russia	839	4.21%
Total		19,916	100%

==== District 17 ====
Summary of the 18–20 September 2026 Duma of Astrakhan Oblast election in District 17
Candidate	Party	Votes	%
Azat Shafigullin	United Russia	7,732	47.23%
Aleksandr Nesterenko	Liberal Democratic Party	5,283	32.27%
Nina Zubkova	A Just Russia	3,239	19.78%
Total		16,372	100%

==== District 18 ====
Summary of the 18–20 September 2026 Duma of Astrakhan Oblast election in District 18
Candidate	Party	Votes	%
Yelena Somova	United Russia	10,762	60.83%
Yulia Kot	New People	3,687	20.84%
Vladislav Boyko	Communist Party	1,915	10.82%
Tagir Kaneyev	Liberal Democratic Party	971	5.49%
Total		17,691	100%

==== District 19 ====
Summary of the 18–20 September 2026 Duma of Astrakhan Oblast election in District 19
Candidate	Party	Votes	%
Tatyana Ulezko	United Russia	10,210	51.64%
Vasily Alyokhin	Communist Party	3,648	18.45%
Konstantin Luchnikov	New People	3,190	16.13%
Nail Krotov	Liberal Democratic Party	2,434	12.31%
Total		19,772	100%

==== District 20 ====
Summary of the 18–20 September 2026 Duma of Astrakhan Oblast election in District 20
Candidate	Party	Votes	%
Vladimir Lanzmann	United Russia	7,282	48.05%
Dmitry Komarov	New People	3,413	22.52%
Sergey Teplov	Liberal Democratic Party	1,676	11.06%
Tatyana Salamakhina	Communist Party	1,313	8.66%
Yana Zakurdayeva	A Just Russia	1,203	7.94%
Total		15,155	100%

==== District 21 ====
Summary of the 18–20 September 2026 Duma of Astrakhan Oblast election in District 21
Candidate	Party	Votes	%
Vladimir Sukharev (incumbent)	Rodina	5,557	29.62%
Anastasia Dasayeva	United Russia	4,927	26.26%
Aleksandr Chursin	Party of Pensioners	2,507	13.36%
Yelena Tarasenkova	New People	2,393	12.76%
Dana Semyonova	Liberal Democratic Party	1,623	8.65%
Gulbanu Yefimenkova	Communist Party	835	4.45%
Aleksandra Koltunova	A Just Russia	558	2.97%
Total		18,761	100%

==== District 22 ====
Summary of the 18–20 September 2026 Duma of Astrakhan Oblast election in District 22
Candidate	Party	Votes	%
Yevgeny Sutyrin	United Russia	6,531	40.08%
Yevgeny Kochenev	New People	3,923	24.08%
Andrey Yakovlev	A Just Russia	2,701	16.58%
Ksenia Shibayeva	Liberal Democratic Party	1,755	10.77%
Sergey Vasilchenko	Communist Party	1,007	6.18%
Total		16,293	100%

=== Members ===
Incumbent deputies are highlighted with bold, elected members who declined to take a seat are marked with ~~strikethrough~~.

Constituency
No.	Member	Party
1	Aleksey Bobrov	United Russia
2	Sergey Bukin	United Russia
3	Vitaly Gutman	United Russia
4	Andrey Melnichenko	United Russia
5	Nurlan Supugaliyev	United Russia
6	Maksim Senektutov	United Russia
7	Igor Martynov	United Russia
8	Nikolay Lyashko	United Russia
9	Gennady Ordenov	United Russia
10	Yulia Nesterova	United Russia
11	Aleksey Karnaukhov	United Russia
12	Yevgeny Apostolov	United Russia
13	Igor Alekseyev	United Russia
14	Aleksandr Shumeyko	United Russia
15	Larisa Samodayeva	Party of Pensioners
16	Sergey Poroysky	United Russia
17	Azat Shafigullin	United Russia
18	Yelena Somova	United Russia
19	Tatyana Ulezko	United Russia
20	Vladimir Lanzmann	United Russia
21	Vladimir Sukharev	Rodina
22	Yevgeny Sutyrin	United Russia

Party lists
Member	Party
~~Igor Babushkin~~	United Russia
Aleksandr Khodayev	United Russia
Andrey Okhlobystin	United Russia
Aleksey Serov	United Russia
Andrey Markin	United Russia
Pavel Androsov	United Russia
Oleg Petelin	United Russia
Yegor Ugarov	United Russia
Aleksandr Timofeyev	United Russia
~~Rinat Ayupov~~	United Russia
Olga Panova	United Russia
Aleksandr Istratenko	United Russia
Arsen Mutelimov	United Russia
~~Natalia Shakhmedova~~	United Russia
Khamzat Daudov	United Russia
Iskander Kugushev	United Russia
Sergey Sevastyanov	Communist Party
Vladislav Konyayev	Communist Party
Gulbanu Yefimenkova	Communist Party
Timofey Shcherbakov	Liberal Democratic Party
Yevgeny Babushkin	Liberal Democratic Party
Yevgeny Dunayev	Liberal Democratic Party
Sergey Lampadov	New People
Valentina Antipova	New People
Maria Lidzhiyeva	A Just Russia

== See also ==
- 2026 Russian regional elections
