= Elections in Astrakhan Oblast =

Until 2004 only two officials of Astrakhan Oblast were elected by people: the Governor of the oblast and the oblast legislature. The legislative body of the oblast was the Representatives Assembly of Astrakhan Oblast in 1994-2001; since then it was replaced by the State Duma of Astrakhan Oblast.

The process of the elections of the leaders of Russian federal subjects was abolished by then-President Vladimir Putin in 2004.

== Governor election in Astrakhan Oblast ==
=== 1996 elections ===
1996 marks the first elections of the head of the oblast in the history of this territory.

In the elections participated the current head of the region Anatoly Guzhvin (appointed by Boris Yeltsin in 1991) and leader of opposition, representative of Communist Party of the Russian Federation, deputy of the Russian State Duma Vyacheslav Zvolynsky.

The results were as follows:

| Name | Percentage |
|---|---|
| Anatoly Guzhvin | 52.5% |
| Vyacheslav Zvolynsky | 40.00% |

=== 2000 elections ===
In 2000 took place the second elections of the Governor.

In the elections participated the current head of the region Anatoly Guzhvin and less popular politicians.

The results were as follows:

| Name | Percentage |
|---|---|
| Anatoly Guzhvin | 81.8% |
| Alexander Mikhailov | 6% |
| Victor Likhobabin | 4% |

== Legislative election in Astrakhan Oblast ==
=== 2006 elections ===
In 2006 the oblast legislature - State Duma of Astrakhan Oblast - was elected by mixed Voting system. One half of deputies was elected by Plurality voting system, another half - by Proportional representation.

On the voting for political parties there was 7-percent Election threshold.

Results of voting for political parties:

| Name | Percentage |
|---|---|
| United Russia Party | 38.7% |
| Rodina | 16.1% |
| Communist Party of the Russian Federation | 13.6% |
| Russian Pensioners' Party | 9.6% |

In 2006 Astrakhan Oblast was the only Russian federal subject, where Rodina could get enough significant support. The ruling party - United Russia - has got relatively low support.

== See also ==
- Electoral geography of Russia
