= Astrakhan Kazakhs =

Astrakhan Kazakhs Астрахан қазақтары
Total population
- 200,586

Regions with significant populations
- Astrakhan Oblast: 149,415
- Volgograd Oblast: 46,223
- Republic of Kalmykia: 4,948

Languages
- Kazakh, Russian

Religion
- Islam, other (including atheism)

Astrakhan Kazakhs (Russian: Астраханские казахи, Kazakh: астрахандық қазақтар) are people of Kazakh ethnicity originating from or living in the historically Central Asian city and region of Astrakhan in South-Western Russia. The Kazakhs of the neighboring regions of Volgograd and Kalmykia share history and culture with Astrakhan Kazakhs and are often considered a part of them. They are the second biggest ethnic group in Astrakhan Oblast, making up about 16% of its population. Their demographic situation is stable and their number and percentage are growing, unlike those of many other population groups including ethnic Russians.

== Language ==
Astrakhan Kazakhs generally speak Western dialects of the Kazakh language, but in bigger villages and towns language shift to Russian is becoming more and more common. Many rural schools offer standard Kazakh as a non-mandatory subject, using textbooks imported from Kazakhstan.

Astrakhan dialects of Russian are noticeably influenced by Kazakh and differ considerably from the Central Russian spoken in Moscow and its surroundings.
