= Alexander Bashkin =

Russian politician (born 1962)

- Александр Башкин
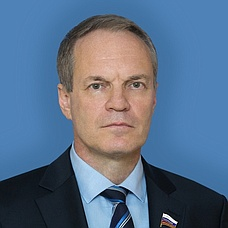

Senator from Astrakhan Oblast
- In office 27 September 2016 – 27 March 2024
- Preceded by: Igor Martynov
- Succeeded by: Andrii Derkach

Personal details
- Born: Alexander Bashkin; 10 June 1962 (age 64) Astrakhan, Russian Soviet Federative Socialist Republic, Soviet Union
- Education: Astrakhan State Medical University

Alexander Davydovich Bashkin (Russian: Александр Давыдович Башки; born 10 June 1962) is a Russian politician serving as a senator from Astrakhan Oblast since 27 September 2016.

== Career ==
Alexander Bashkin was born on 10 June 1962 in Astrakhan, Russian Soviet Federative Socialist Republic. In 1985, he graduated from the Astrakhan State Medical University. In 1995, he also received a degree from the Volgograd Academy of Public Administration. In 1988, he defended his dissertation in Medical Sciences. From 1985 to 1993, Bashkin taught at the Department of Operative Surgery of the Astrakhan Medical Institute. In 1990, he was elected to the Astrakhan Council of People's Deputies. From 1993 to 1999, Alexander Bashkin worked as the executive director of the regional Fund for Social Support of the Population. In 1998, he was elected deputy of the Astrakhan Regional Representative Assembly of the 2nd convocation. He was re-elected to the regional parliament in 2001, 2006, 2011 and 2016. On 27 September 2016, he was appointed a senator from Astrakhan Oblast.

== Sanctions ==
Alexander Bashkin is under personal sanctions introduced by the European Union, the United Kingdom, the US, Canada, Switzerland, Australia, Ukraine, New Zealand, for ratifying the decisions of the "Treaty of Friendship, Cooperation and Mutual Assistance between the Russian Federation and the Donetsk People's Republic and between the Russian Federation and the Luhansk People's Republic" and providing political and economic support for Russia's annexation of Ukrainian territories.
