= Gennady Ordenov =

Russian politician

- Геннадий Орденов
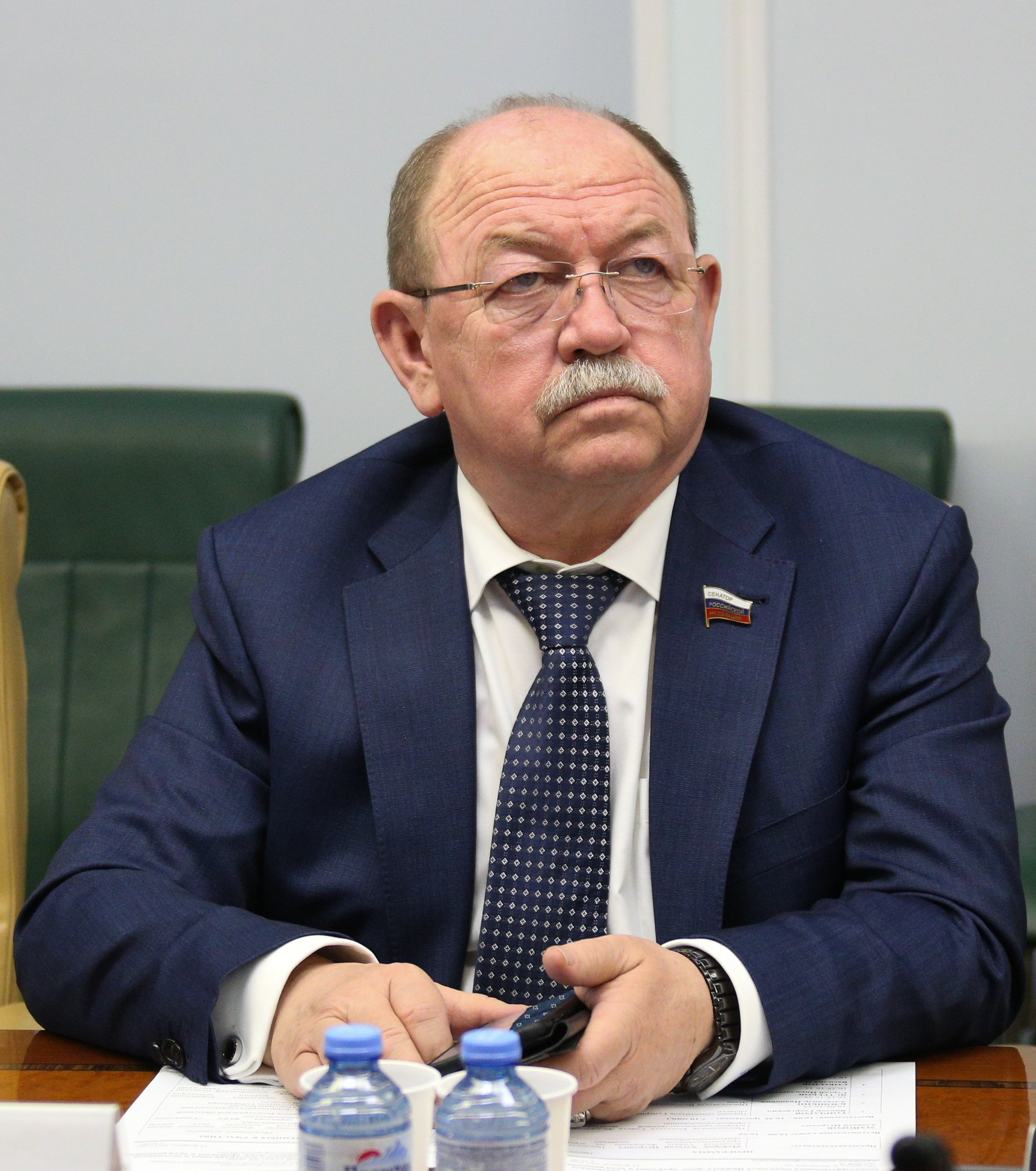
- Ordenov in 2021

Senator from Astrakhan Oblast
- Incumbent
- Assumed office 23 September 2021
- Preceded by: Gennady Gorbunov

Personal details
- Born: Gennady Ordenov; 4 September 1957 (age 69) Kobda District, Aktobe Region, Kazakh Soviet Socialist Republic, Soviet Union
- Party: United Russia
- Education: Gubkin Russian State University of Oil and Gas

Gennady Ivanovich Ordenov (Russian: Геннадий Иванович Орденов; born 4 September 1957) is a Russian politician serving as a senator from Astrakhan Oblast since 23 September 2021.

== Biography ==
Gennady Ordenov was born on 4 September 1957 in Kobda District, Aktobe Region. In 1984, he graduated from the Gubkin Russian State University of Oil and Gas. From 1976, he worked as a geophysicist. From 1984 to 1996, he was the head of several geological expeditions. From 1996 to 2003, Ordenov became the head of the municipal formation "Working Village Ilyinka". From 2003 to 2005, he was the deputy head of the Arkhangelsk Oblast administration. In 2008, he was appointed Deputy General Director for General Affairs of the Lukoil branch Nizhnevolzhskneft. On 14 March 2010, Ordenov became deputy of the Astrakhan City Duma of the 5th convocation. On 4 December 2011, he was elected deputy of the Duma of Astrakhan Oblast of the 5th convocation. On 23 September 2021 he became the senator from the Legislative Assembly of Astrakhan Oblast.

Gennady Ordenov is under personal sanctions introduced by the European Union, the United Kingdom, the USA, Canada, Switzerland, Australia, Ukraine, New Zealand, for ratifying the decisions of the "Treaty of Friendship, Cooperation and Mutual Assistance between the Russian Federation and the Donetsk People's Republic and between the Russian Federation and the Luhansk People's Republic" and providing political and economic support for Russia's annexation of Ukrainian territories.
