= List of chairmen of the Astrakhan Oblast Duma =

The following is a list of chairmen of the Astrakhan Oblast Duma:

Name	Took office/left office
Valery Borodaev	1994–1997
Pavel Anisimov	1997–2006
Aleksandr Klykanov	2006–Present
