= Anatoly Guzhvin =

Russian politician

- Анатолий Гужвин
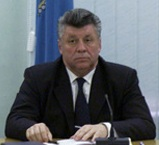
- Guzhvin in 2002

1st Governor of Astrakhan Oblast
- In office August 28, 1991 – August 17, 2004
- Succeeded by: Alexander Zhilkin

Personal details
- Born: March 25, 1946 Akhtubinsk, Astrakhan Oblast, RSFSR, USSR
- Died: August 17, 2004 (aged 58) Sochi, Krasnodar Krai, Russia
- Party: United Russia
- Profession: Electrical Engineer

Anatoly Petrovich Guzhvin (Russian: Анатолий Петрович Гужвин; March 25, 1946 – August 17, 2004) was a Russian politician and governor of Astrakhan Oblast.

== Career ==
Between 1988 and the breakup of the Soviet Union, Guzhvin was a regional deputy in the Soviet Supreme Council. He assumed the governorship of the Astrakhan Oblast region in 1991, and re-elected on December 11, 1996. He was a member of the United Russia party.

== Death ==
He died of a heart attack aged 58 while holidaying in the resort town of Sochi on the Black Sea.
