= Governor of Astrakhan Oblast =

Highest-ranking official in Astrakhan Oblast, Russia

- Coat of arms of Astrakhan Oblast

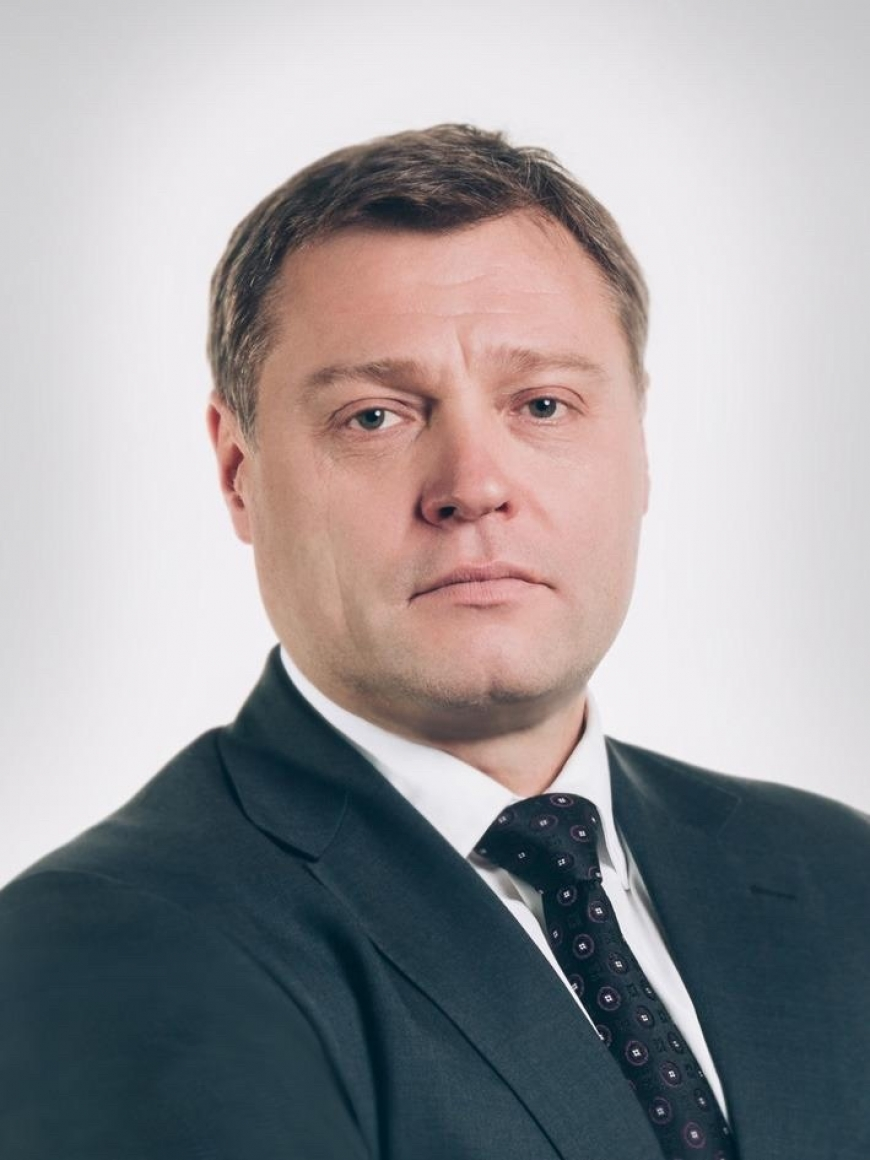
- Incumbent; Igor Babushkin since 17 September 2019
- Status: Head of federal subject
- Seat: Astrakhan
- Term length: 5 years
- Constituting instrument: Charter of Astrakhan Oblast, Section 3
- Inaugural holder: Anatoly Guzhvin
- Formation: 1991
- Website: www.astrobl.ru

The Governor of Astrakhan Oblast (Russian: Губернатор Астраханской области) is the head of government of Astrakhan Oblast, a federal subject of Russia.

The position was introduced in 1991 as Head of Administration of Astrakhan Oblast. The Governor is elected by direct popular vote for a term of five years.

== List of officeholders ==
No.	Portrait	Governor	Tenure	Time in office	Party	Election
1		Anatoly Guzhvin (1946–2004)	28 August 1991 – 17 August 2004 (died in office)	12 years, 355 days	Independent	Appointed 1996; 2000
—		Alexander Zhilkin (born 1959)	17 August 2004 – 2 November 2004 (resigned to run for a full term)	77 days	Independent	Acting
—		Alexander Glazkov (born 1951)	2 November 2004 – 23 December 2004 (successor took office)	51 days	Independent	Acting
2		Alexander Zhilkin (born 1959)	23 December 2004 – 26 September 2018 (resigned)	13 years, 277 days	United Russia	2004; 2009 (Note: Appointed by the president of Russia with the consent of the State Duma of Astrakhan Oblast.); 2014
—		Sergey Morozov (born 1973)	26 September 2018 – 5 June 2019 (resigned)	252 days	United Russia	Acting
—		Igor Babushkin (born 1970)	5 June 2019 – 17 September 2019	7 years, 94 days	Independent → United Russia	Acting
3		Igor Babushkin (born 1970)	17 September 2019 – present	7 years, 94 days	Independent → United Russia	2019; 2024
