= Astrakhan State Medical University =

- Астраханский государственный медицинский университет
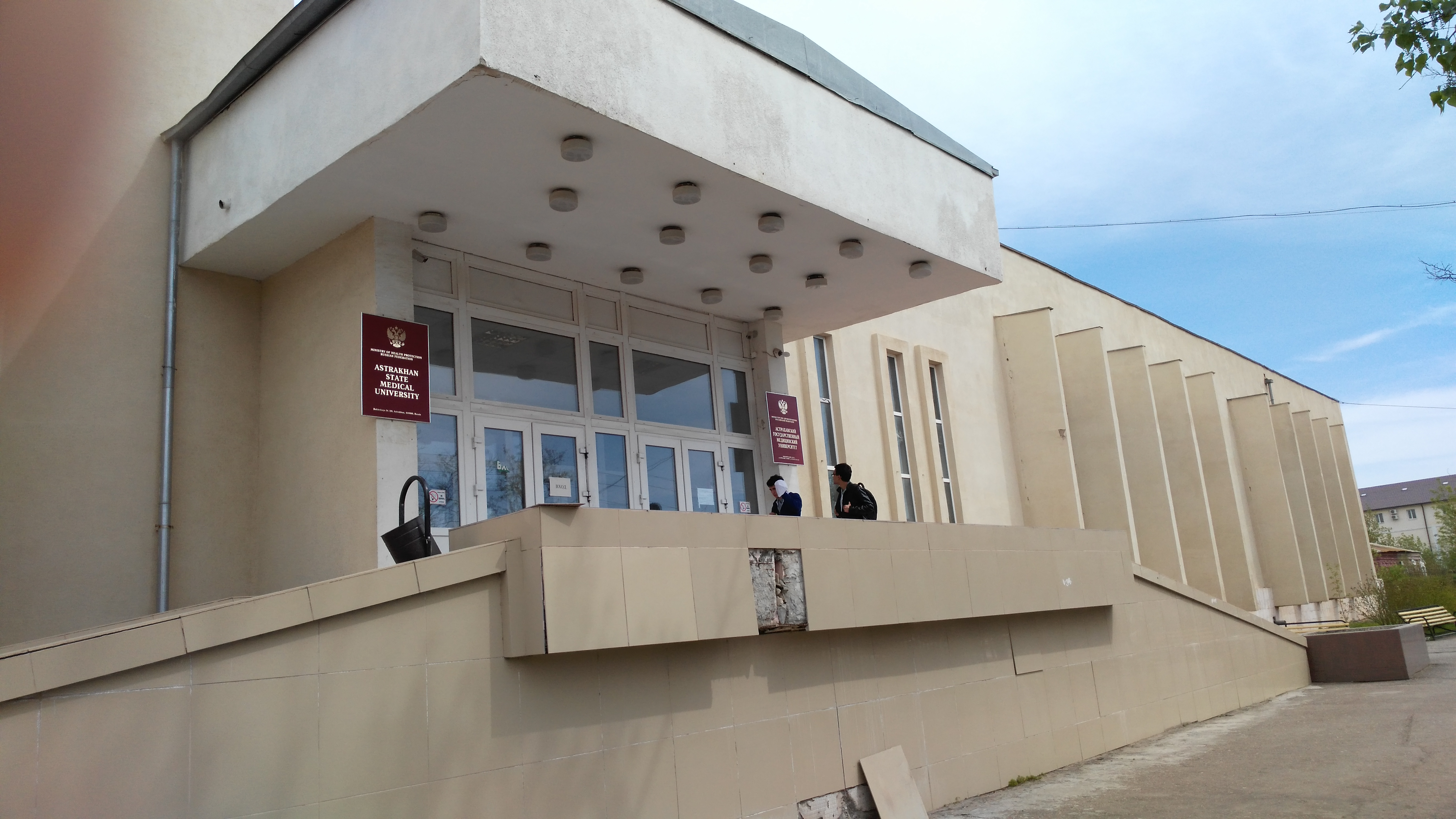
- Astrakhan State Medical University in 2016
- Type: Public
- Established: 7 November 1918
- Students: 6500
- Location: Astrakhan, Russia; 46°20′29″N 48°02′22″E
- Campus: Urban
- Nickname: Astrakhan MGU (Russian: Астраханский ГМУ)
- Website: www.astgmu.ru

Astrakhan State Medical University (Russian: Астраханский государственный медицинский университет) is a higher education institution in Astrakhan, Astrakhan Oblast, Russia.

== History ==
At the end of 1918, by order of Vladimir Lenin, Astrakhan State University was established with a medical faculty. By order of the People's Commissariat of Health of the RSFSR, Semyon Zalkind was recalled from the army and appointed dean of the medical faculty. He was the first organizer of a higher medical educational institution in Astrakhan, which subsequently played an important role in training medical personnel for the Lower Volga, North Caucasus, and Kalmykia regions. In 1922, all university faculties, except for the medical faculty, were abolished, and the university was transformed into a medical institute.

In 1922, and again in 1970, students and faculty of the institute participated in the eradication of the cholera epidemic. In 1927, the institute received the building of the former Armenian Theological Seminary, which became the university's main administrative and theoretical building. In 1937, the first student dormitory was built.

In 1948, the Student Scientific Society was formed. The second dormitory was built in 1963, the third in 1966, the fourth in 1976, and the fifth in 1980. The Central Scientific Research Laboratory opened in 1977.

In 1987, a new (now main) theoretical building was built at 121 Bakinskaya street. The university's history museum opened in 1988, and the faculties for advanced medical training, postgraduate training, and international students opened in 1993.

In 1995, the university was renamed the Astrakhan State Medical Academy.

The educational institution comprises 11 faculties, 60 departments and courses, and offers postgraduate programs in 26 specialties and doctoral programs in 3. The academy employs 9 full members and 2 corresponding members of various public academies, approximately 100 doctors of medical sciences, professors, and more than 300 associate professors and candidates of sciences. Currently, 3,780 students, 197 interns, 176 residents, and 73 postgraduate students are enrolled. Since 1923, more than 25,400 physicians have graduated.

On October 31, 2014, the academy was renamed Astrakhan State Medical University.
