= Alexander Zhilkin =

Russian politician

- Александр Жилкин
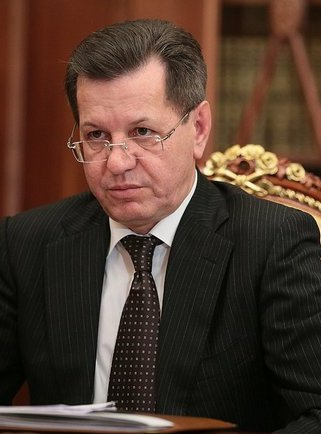
- Zhilkin in 2014

2nd Governor of Astrakhan Oblast
- In office August 28, 2004 – 26 September 2018
- Preceded by: Anatoly Guzhvin
- Succeeded by: Sergey Morozov

Personal details
- Born: August 26, 1959 (age 67) Tsvetnoy, Astrakhan Oblast, RSFSR, USSR
- Party: United Russia
- Profession: Teacher, School Principal, Doctor

Alexander Alexandrovich Zhilkin (Russian: Алекса́ндр Алекса́ндрович Жи́лкин; born August 26, 1959) is a Russian politician who served as the Governor of Astrakhan Oblast between 2004 and 2018. He became acting governor in August 2004, when governor Anatoly Guzhvin died. Zhilkin was elected governor as a candidate of the United Russia party in 2004, receiving 65% of the vote. He was the first deputy before he became the governor. On 26 October 2018, he resigned and was replaced by Sergey Morozov.

== Awards ==
- Order For Merit to the Fatherland 4th (2008)
- Order of Honour (2003)
- Order of Friendship (1998)
