= Sovetskaya Street =

Street in Astrakhan, Russia

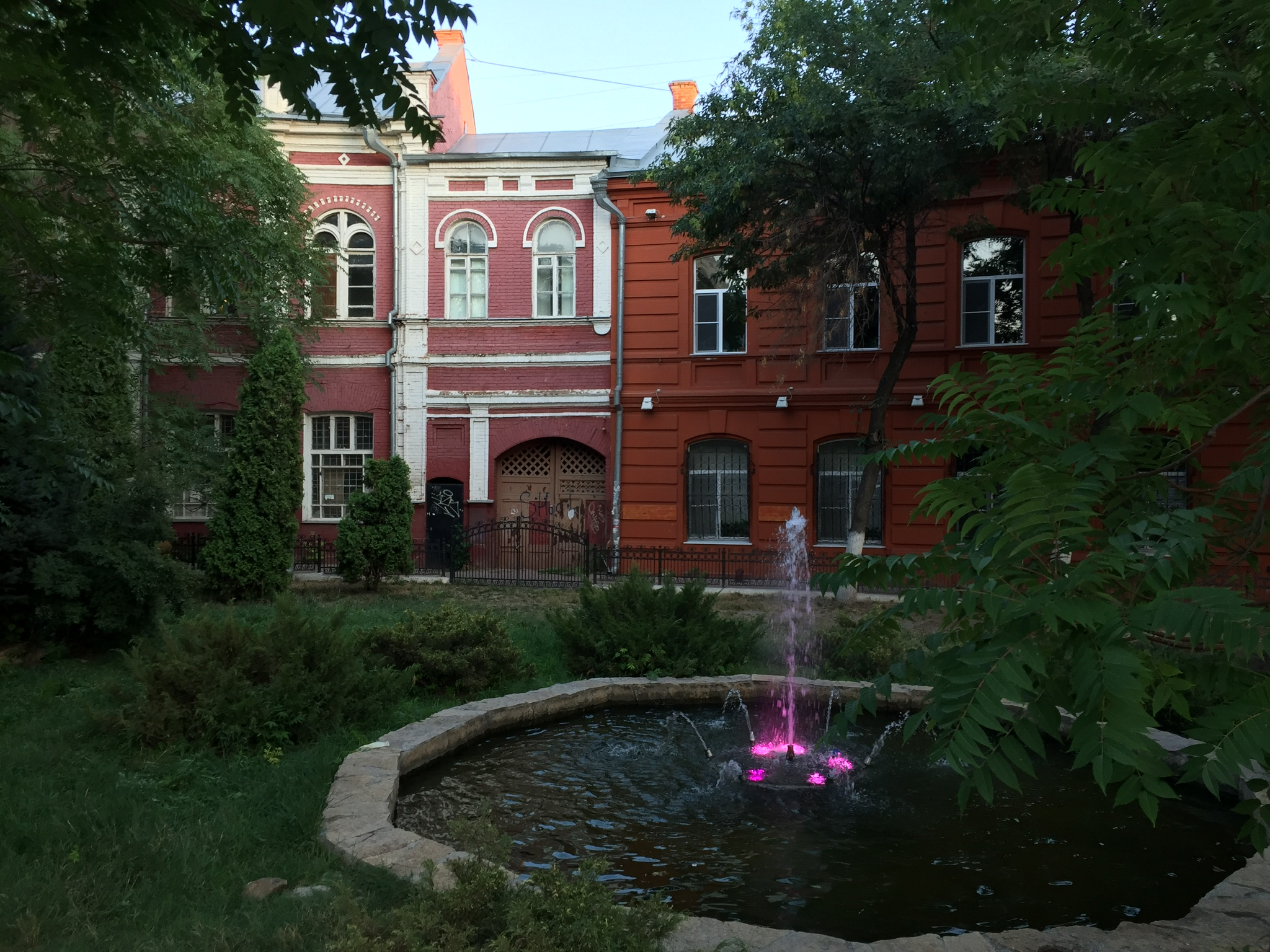
- Interactive map of Sovetskaya Street
- Native name: Советская улица (Russian)
- Former names: Ekaterininskaya, Moskovskaya
- Namesake: Soviet Union
- Type: Public
- Length: 1,091 m (3,579 ft)
- Area: White Town
- Location: Astrakhan, Russia
- Postal code: 414000
- Coordinates: 46.349°N 48.041°E
- West end: Trediakovskogo Street
- East end: Kalinina Street

Sovetskaya (Russian: Советская) is a street about one kilometer long in the historical centre of Astrakhan, Russia. It forms the heart of the White Town historic district. It begins near the walls of the Astrakhan Kremlin stretching from Trediakovski to Kalinine Streets. Its modern name literally means 'the Soviet'.
