= Astrakhan Russian =

Variety of Russian

- Native to: Russia
- Region: Astrakhan Oblast
- Native speakers: 1,014,065
- Language family: Indo-European: Balto-Slavic; Slavic; East Slavic; Russian; Astrakhan Russian

Language codes
- ISO 639-3: –
- IETF: ru-u-sd-ruast

Astrakhan Russian (Russian: Астраханский русский) is an umbrella term for the regional varieties of the Russian language spoken in Astrakhan Oblast, a federal subject of Russia. Astrakhan Oblast is one of the most diverse parts of the country in terms of ethnic groups and languages. The major groups are ethnic Russians (61% of the population), Kazakhs (17%) and Tatars (7%), but many others are also present and influence the shared local identity, culture and language varieties.

Being a regional rather than linguistic unity, Astrakhan Russian is a term for a broad group of dialects varying between speakers depending on their ethnicity, native language, age, education, occupation, location within the region and other social factors. Nevertheless, they share certain traits and can be grouped into a few categories.

The main divide is that between Russians and people of other ethnic groups, as the speech of the latter is influenced by the vernacular languages of their communities. Astrakhan Russian as spoken by Kazakh people is noticeably influenced by the Kazakh language on most levels, and this is not limited to native Kazakh speakers. It is common for people of minority background to grow up in an ethnically and linguistically diverse town or city in the region speaking only Russian, but their Russian typically still has traces of their heritage language.

== Vocabulary ==
One of the things that unite Astrakhan Russian speakers of all ethnic backgrounds is a group of local words that do not exist in standard Russian and other Russian dialects or have different meanings in them. In many cases these words originate from Turkic languages. Here are some examples:

- карга (karga) 'crow'; this word exists in standard Russian and most Russian dialects, but only as a pejorative way to refer to an elderly woman. Its origin in Astrakhan Russian and other dialects is the same, both words come from Turkic qarğa 'crow', but Astrakhan Russian preserved its original meaning, whereas other varieties only use it as a metaphor;
- чушка (čuska) 'untidy person'; this word originates from Kazakh şoşqa 'pig'. A similar word exists in other Russian dialects, but stress falls on the other syllable (second in Astrakhan, first elsewhere), and the meanings vary;
- демьянка (demianka) 'eggplant'; origin unknown;
- кильдим (kildim) 'gathering (of family or friends)'; unique to Astrakhan Russian, Turkic origin;
- ерик (yerik) 'small river'; this word exists in standard Russian but originates from the Astrakhan region; Turkic origin;
- ильмень (ilmen) 'small desert lake'; unique to Astrakhan Russian as a common noun, only exists elsewhere as a toponym.
- чебак (čebak) 'lotus flower'; unique to Astrakhan Russian, origin unknown;
- сандык (sanyk) 'puddle'; unique to Astrakhan Russian, possibly Turkic origin.

== See also ==
- Varieties of the Russian language

== Literature ==
- Kondrashova, Olga (2014) Dialektizmy Astrahanskoj oblasti.
- Losev, Gennady & Kirokosian, Mihail (2007) Astrahanskie slovečki. Astrahan: Čilim. 260 p.
