= Sergey Petrovich Morozov =

Russian politician

Sergey Morozov
- Сергей Морозов
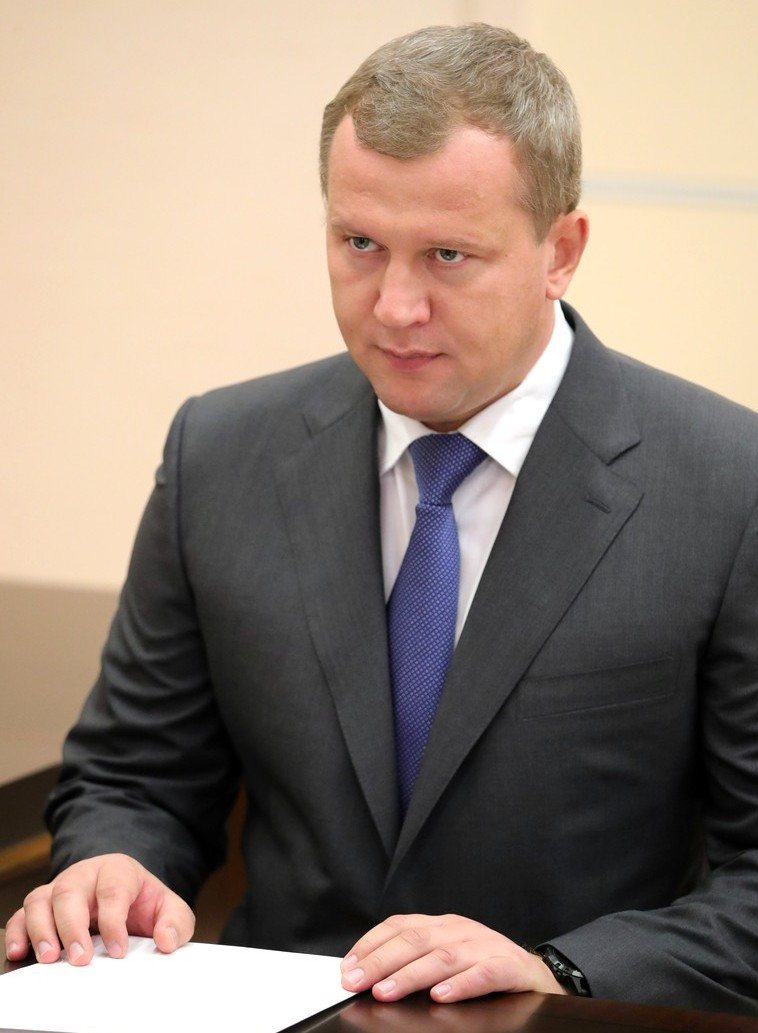

Governor of Astrakhan Oblast (acting)
- In office 26 September 2018 – 5 June 2019
- Preceded by: Alexander Zhilkin
- Succeeded by: Igor Babushkin

Personal details
- Born: Sergey Petrovich Morozov; 9 May 1973 (age 52) Belovo, Russia, Soviet Union
- Party: Independent
- Spouse: Alina

Sergey Petrovich Morozov (Russian: Сергей Петрович Морозов; born 9 May 1973), is a Russian statesman and security official, who is currently an employee of the state security bodies.

Morozov served as the acting Governor of Astrakhan Oblast from 2018 to 2019.

He is a major general as of 2017.

== Biography ==
Sergey Morozov was born on 9 May 1973 in the city of Belovo, Kemerovo Oblast.

In 1992, after graduating from the Leningrad River School, he began his career as a navigator-navigator at the Nevsky Shipbuilding and Ship Repair Plant.

From 1992 to 1994, Morozov served in the Russian Armed Forces.

In 1994, Morozov was hired by the Federal Security Service.

In 1999, he received a diploma of higher education from the Saint Petersburg State Academy of Physical Culture named after P.F. Lesgaft.

During his years of service, he repeatedly underwent professional retraining at the Russian Academy of State Service under the President ofRussia, the Military Academy of the General Staff of the Armed Forces of Russia, the Russian Academy of National Economy under the programs "State and Municipal Administration" and "State and Military Administration".

From 2016 to 2017, Morozov worked as assistant to the Minister of Defense Sergey Shoygu.

In May 2017, he was awarded the military rank of Major General.

In September 2017, he worked as Deputy Head of the Federal Customs Service of Russia.

On 26 September 2018, by decree of the President of Russia, Morozov was appointed as acting Governor of the Astrakhan Oblast. According to a study conducted by VTsIOM in April 2019, 53% of voters were ready to support him. The electoral potential was estimated at 77%.

On 5 June 2019, he resigned from the post of acting Governor at his own request, which was accepted by the President of Russia on the same day. He will continue to work in one of the Russian special services.

== Family ==
He is married to Alina, who is originally from Rostov-on-Don. They have three children, whom they have two daughters, as the eldest daughter is Kristina (born in 2009) and a son, Bogdan (born in 2013). His paternal brother Vasily Kolesnikov (born in 1983) lives in the city of Bataysk.

== Hobbies ==
He plays a guitar. He loves music, from classics and jazz to folklore.
