= Igor Babushkin =

Russian politician (born 1970)

- Игорь Бабушкин
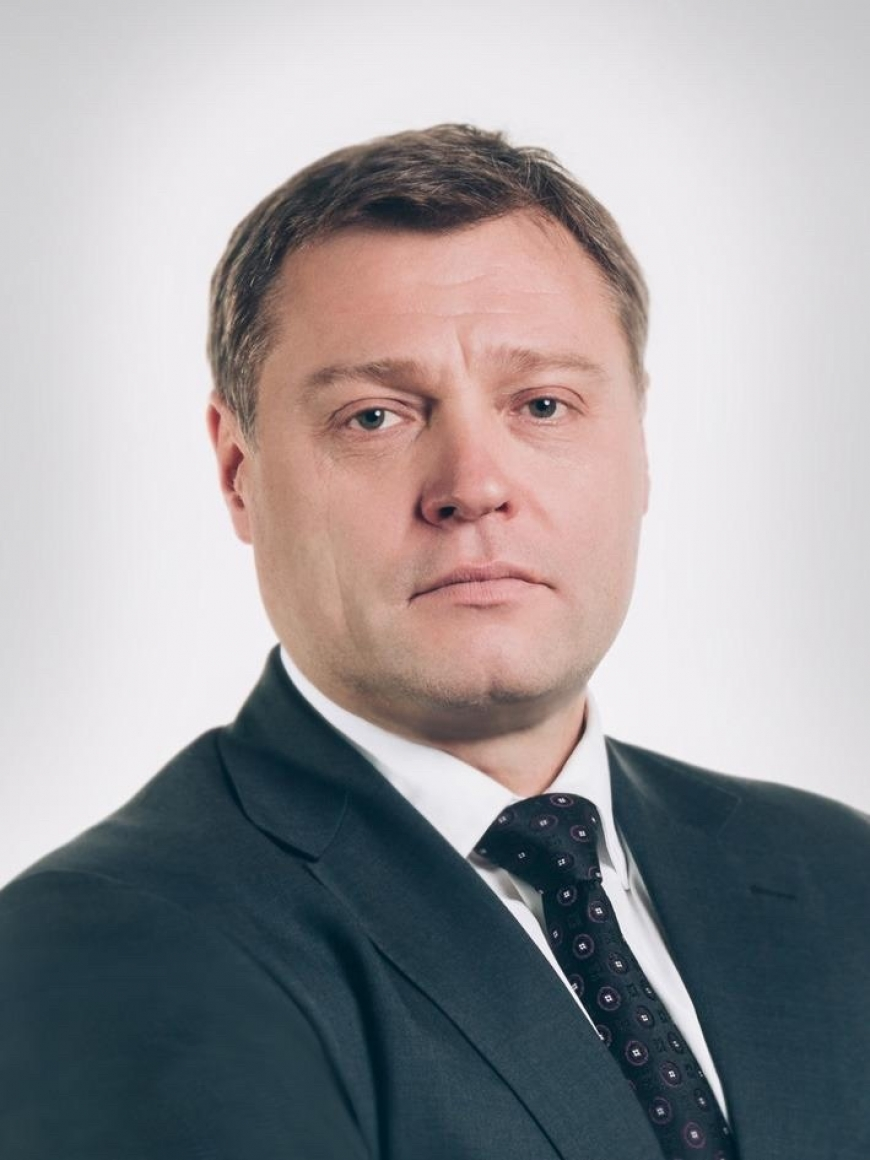
- Babushkin in 2018

3rd Governor of Astrakhan Oblast
- Incumbent
- Assumed office 17 September 2019
- Preceded by: Sergey Morozov (acting)

Governor of Astrakhan Oblast (acting)
- In office 5 June 2019 – 17 June 2019

Deputy Plenipotentiary Representative of the North Caucasian Federal District
- In office September 2018 – 5 June 2019

Personal details
- Born: 5 April 1970 (age 56) Rybinsk, Russian SFSR, Soviet Union
- Education: Moscow Higher Military Command School

Igor Yuryevich Babushkin (Russian: Игорь Юрьевич Бабушкин; born on 5 April 1970) is a Russian politician and former military officer who is currently serving as the 3rd Governor of Astrakhan Oblast since 17 September 2019.

== Biography ==
Igor Babushkin was born in Rybinsk on 5 April 1970.

After school, he entered the Moscow Higher Military Command School, which he graduated in 1992.

Between 1992 and 2012, he served in the Russian Armed Forces and divisions of the Federal Security Service. He graduated from the service in the Federal Agency for Special Construction with the rank of colonel.

In 2002, he received additional education at the Golitsyn Border Institute of the Federal Security Service with a degree in jurisprudence. He also graduated from the Institute of Management, Economics and Innovation.

In January 2013, he was appointed Deputy Head of the Federal Agency for State Property Management. He supervised the administration of the property of the state treasury, federal authorities and organizations in the field of defense and security, the administration of branch organizations and foreign property, organizations of the industrial complex, was responsible for the transfer of religious objects to the Russian Orthodox Church (ROC).

In September 2018, Babuskin was appointed Deputy Plenipotentiary Representative in the North Caucasian Federal District, with Aleksandr Matovnikov.

On 5 June 2019, by decree of the President of Russia, Vladimir Putin, Babuskin was appointed as acting governor of the Astrakhan Oblast.

On the Single Election Day, 8 September 2019, with a result of 75.64% in the first round of elections for the Governor of the Astrakhan Region, Babushkin won the election.

== Personal life ==
He is married and has a daughter.
