= Duma of Astrakhan Oblast =

Regional parliament of Astrakhan Oblast, Russia

Duma of Astrakhan Oblast Дума Астраханской области
- 7th legislature

Type
- Type: Unicameral

Leadership
- Chairman: Igor Martynov, United Russia since 26 September 2016

Structure
- Seats: 44
- Political groups: United Russia (28); SRZP (5); CPRF (5); LDPR (2); RPPSJ (2); New People (1); Rodina (1)

Elections
- Voting system: Mixed
- Last election: 19 September 2021
- Next election: 2026

Meeting place
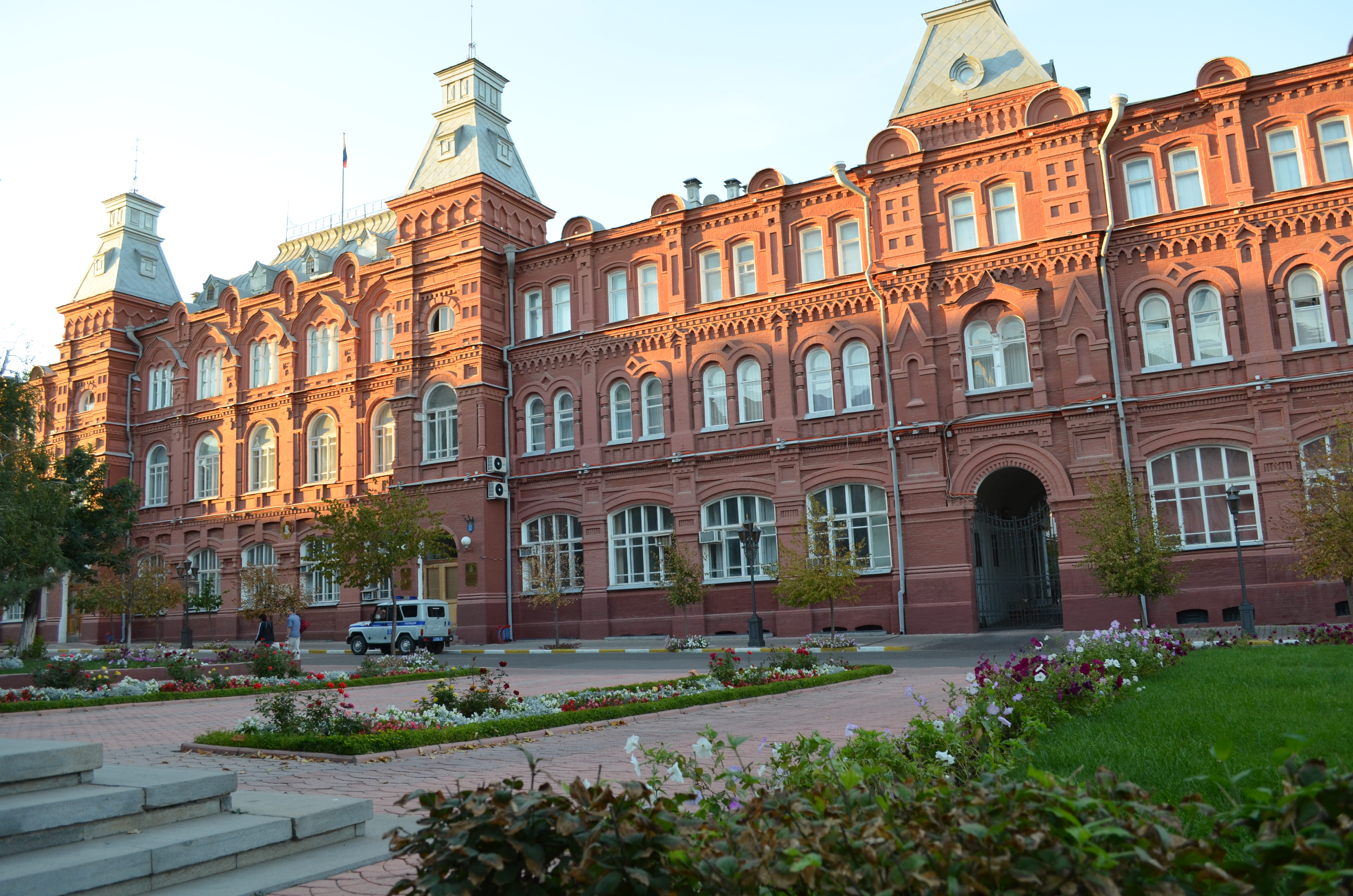
- 15 Volodarskogo Street, Astrakhan

Website
- astroblduma.ru

The Duma of Astrakhan Oblast (Russian: Дума Астраханской области, romanized: Duma Astrakhanskoy oblasti), formerly the State Duma of Astrakhan Oblast (2001–2010), (Note: Russian: Государственная дума Астраханской области, romanized: Gosudarstvennaya duma Astrakhanskoy oblasti) is the regional parliament of Astrakhan Oblast, a federal subject of Russia. A total of 44 deputies are elected for five-year terms.

== Elections ==
=== 2016 ===
Party	%	Seats
United Russia	42.31	36
A Just Russia	21.51	9
Communist Party of the Russian Federation	17.28	6
Liberal Democratic Party of Russia	13.31	4
Self-nominated	—	3
Yabloko	1.17	0
Registered voters/turnout	35.82	

=== 2021 ===
Party	%	Seats (Note: Reduced from 58 seats to 44)
United Russia	46.76	27
Communist Party of the Russian Federation	18.23	5
A Just Russia — For Truth	16.28	5
New People	5.92	1
Liberal Democratic Party of Russia	5.25	2
Russian Party of Pensioners for Social Justice	3.36	2
Rodina	1.82	1
Self-nominated	—	1
Registered voters/turnout	42.50	
