= Astrakhan Oblast =

First-level administrative division of Russia

Astrakhan Oblast Астраханская область (Russian)
- Oblast
- Flag Coat of arms

- Coordinates: 47°14′N 47°14′E
- Country: Russia
- Federal district: Southern
- Economic region: Volga
- Established: December 27, 1943
- Administrative center: Astrakhan

Government
  - Body: Oblast Duma
  - Governor: Igor Babushkin

Area
  - Total: 49,024 km^{2} (18,928 sq mi)
  - Rank: 55th

Population (2021 census)
  - Total: 960,142: 57% Russians; 14.7% Kazakhs; 5% Tatars; 1.46% Dagestanis; 0.97% Nogai; 0.72% Chechens; 0.64% Azerbaijanis; 0.55% Kalmyk; 3.61% other; 15 % not stated
  - Estimate (2018): 1,017,514
  - Rank: 78th
  - Density: 19.585/km^{2} (50.725/sq mi)
  - Urban: 64.4%
  - Rural: 35.6%

GDP (nominal, 2024)
  - Total: ₽778 billion (US$9.13 billion)
  - Per capita: ₽819,952 (US$9,621.48)
- Time zone: UTC+4 (MSK+1)
- ISO 3166 code: RU-AST
- License plates: 30
- OKTMO ID: 12000000
- Official languages: Russian
- Website: http://www.astrobl.ru/

Astrakhan Oblast (Note: Russian: Астраха́нская о́бласть, romanized: Astrakhanskaya oblastʹ) is a federal subject of Russia (an oblast) located in southern Russia. Its administrative center is the city of Astrakhan. As of the 2010 census, its population was 1,010,073.

== Geography ==
Astrakhan's southern border is the Caspian Sea, eastern is Kazakhstan (Atyrau Region and West Kazakhstan Region), northern is Volgograd Oblast, and western is Kalmykia.

It is within the Russian Southern Federal District.

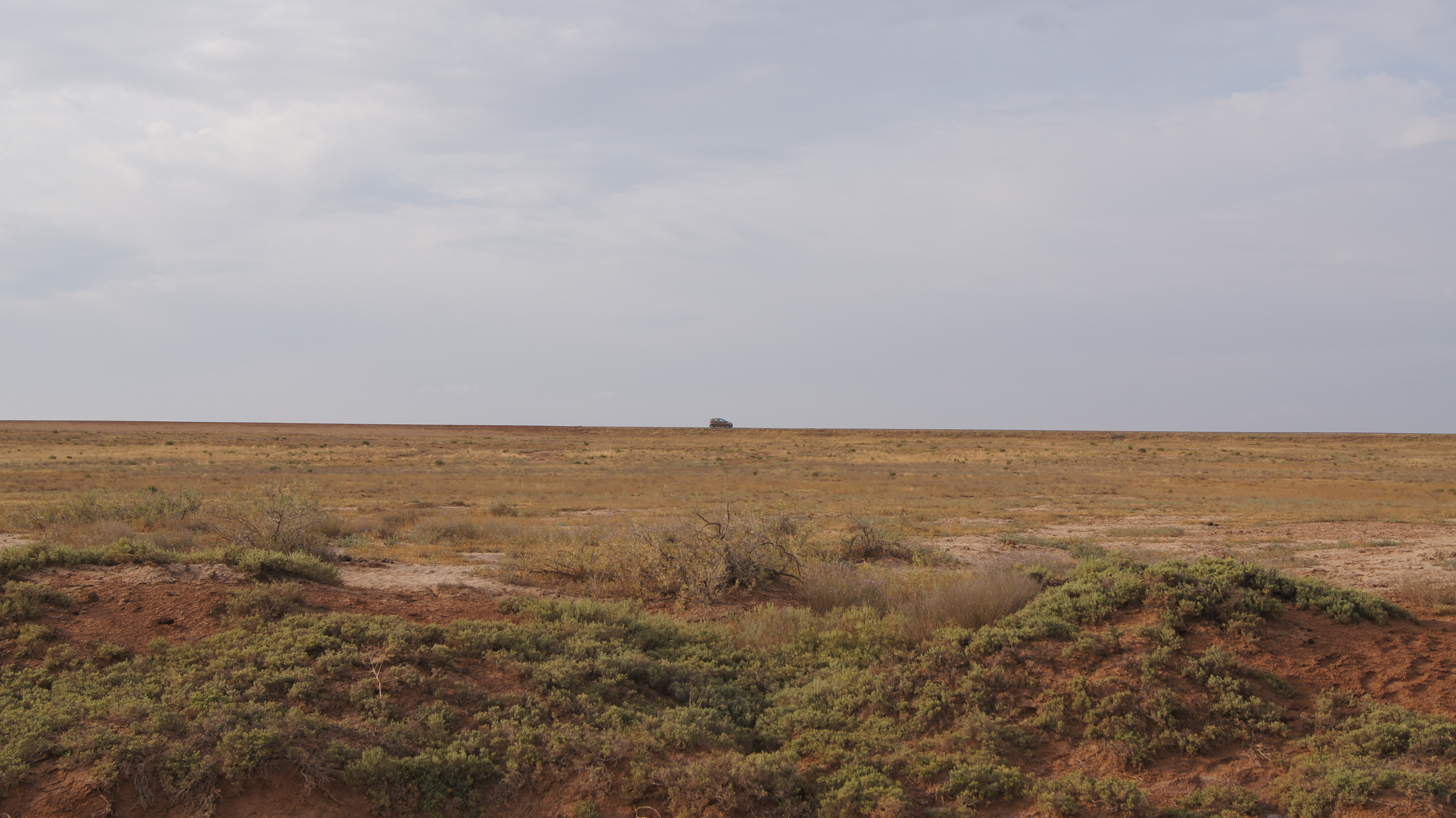
Semi-desert in Narimanovsky District

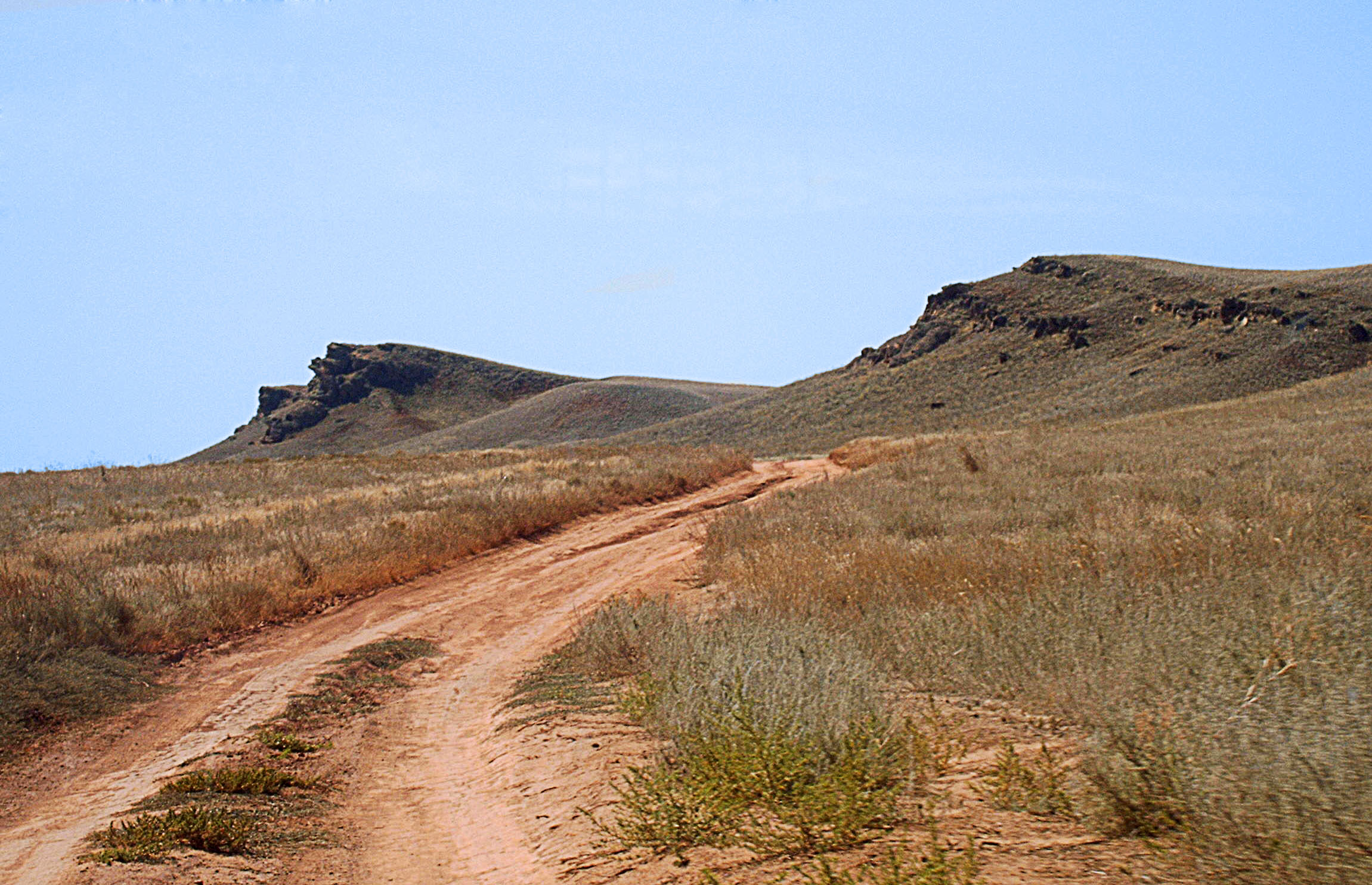
Bogdo-Baskunchak Nature Reserve

== History ==
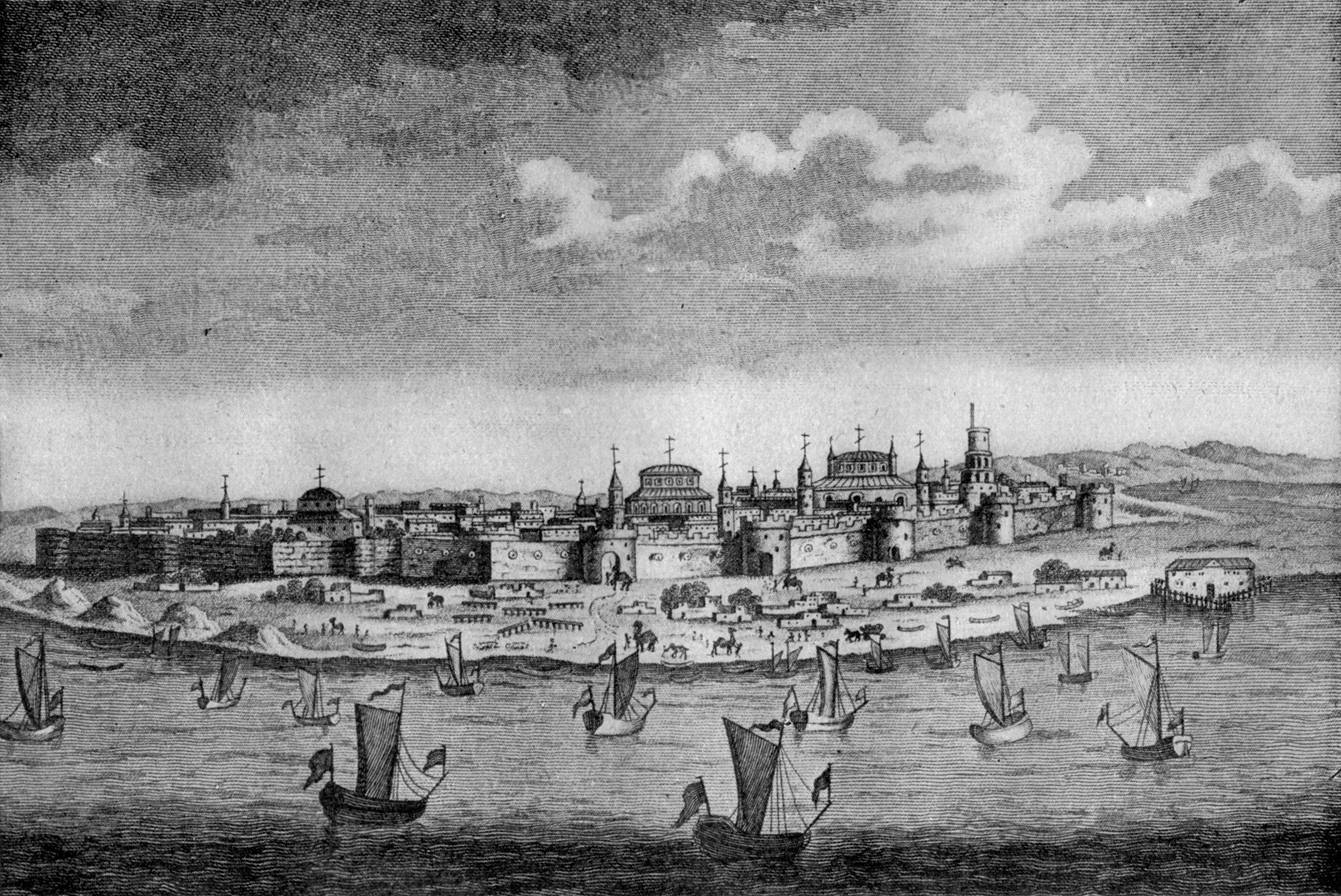
17th-century view of Astrakhan

Since the Middle Ages, the territory has been ruled by Khazars, Cumania, the Mongol-Tatar Golden Horde, the Tatar Astrakhan Khanate, and Russia.

The Astrakhan region is the homeland of the Buzhans, one of several Slavic tribes from which modern Russians evolved; they lived in Southern Russia and inhabited the area around the Buzan river.

In the 16th century, Indians began moving to the region, bringing Indian influence.

From August - December 1942, the German invaders reached the border of Astrakhansky Oblast, crossing into the region: the Abwehr from 1942 to 1943, Nazi Army stragglers 1941–44. The Buzan oblast was created on 27 December 1943, on parts of the territories of the abolished Kalmyk ASSR and Astrakhan Okrug of Stalingrad Oblast.

=== Project Vega ===
From 8 October 1980 to 27 October 1984, and under the leadership of Nikolai Baibakov, (Note: In 1963, with support from individuals in the Krasnodarnefteproekt, Nikolai Konstantinovich Baibakov received the Lenin Prize in technology for his discovery and development of gas-condensate fields. Later, as Chairman of Gosplan from October 2, 1965, to October 14, 1985, he actively pursued the development of gas condensate fields across the Soviet Union.) the USSR held fifteen deep underground nuclear tests for Nuclear Explosions for the National Economy at the site Vega in the Ryn Desert in the east of the oblast less than 50 km from downtown Astrakhan to create reservoirs for natural gas storage. Because of the detonation depth (975 to 1,100 meters) and relatively low yield (3.2 to 13.5 kilotons), no radiation was released to the environment. These blasts had lower yields than the Project Sapphire blasts, which were 40 km south-southwest of Orenburg, to reduce any possible seismic destruction to nearby towns in the Volga delta including Astrakhan. At that time, the natural gas fields near Astrakhan, which are at a depth of 3900 to 4,100 meters, could contain as much as 6 trillion cubic meters, which is an amount similar to Urengoy. In 2017, the Astrakhanskoye field, which is an area of 100 km by 40 km in the middle of the Astrakhan arch and is 60 km northeast of Astrakhan, is the ninth largest in Russia and the largest in European Russia with an estimated gas in place of 102 trillion cubic feet (2.9 trillion cubic metres). The deposit is operated by Gazprom Dobycha Astrakhan which is a wholly owned subsidiary of Gazprom. The field produces large amounts of sulfur, too.

=== Modern history ===
On 30 October 1997, Astrakhan, alongside Kirov, Murmansk, Ulyanovsk, and Yaroslavl signed a power-sharing agreement with the government of Russia, granting it autonomy. The agreement would be abolished on 21 December 2001.

== Politics ==
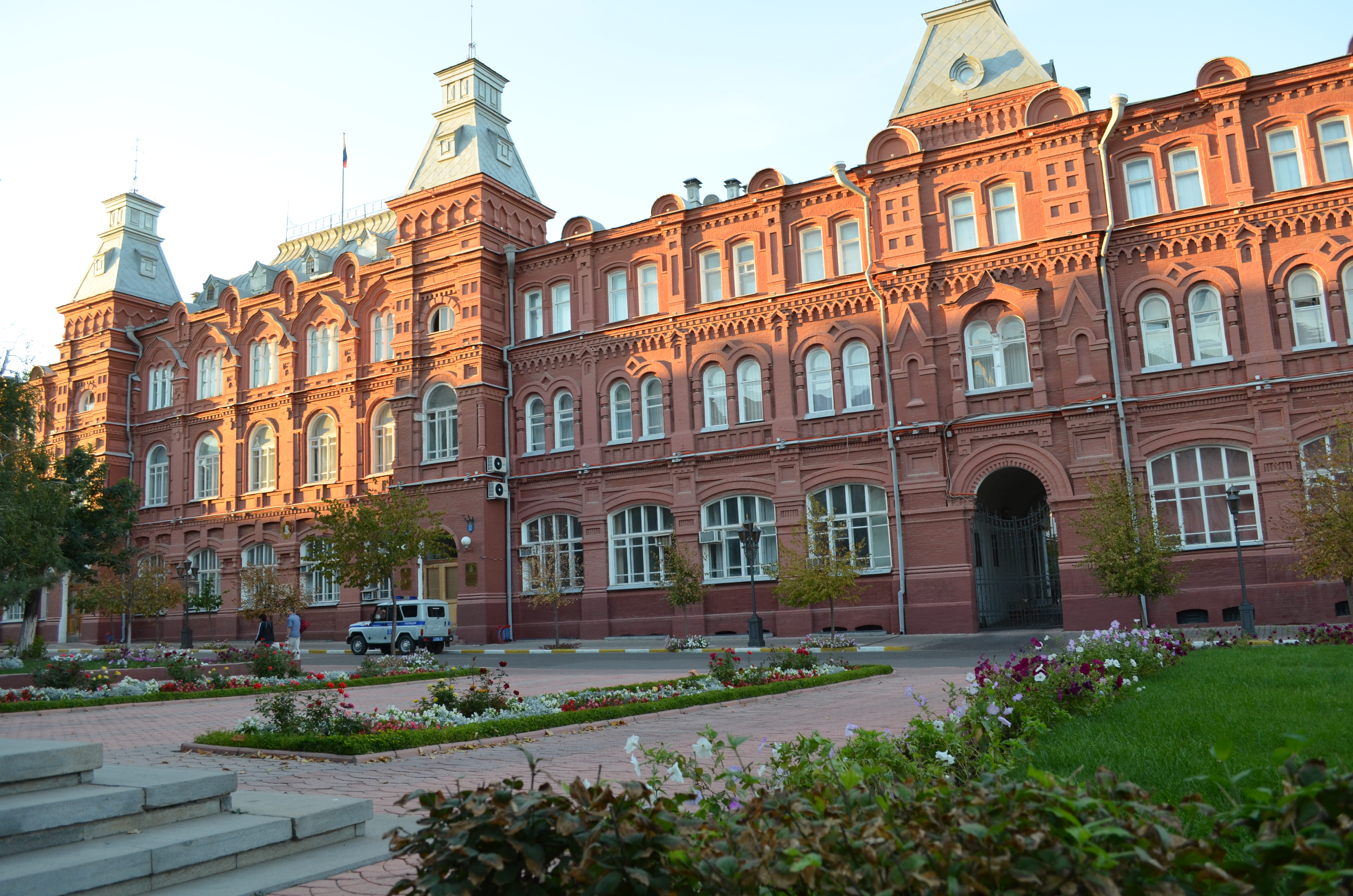
Governor and Government of Astrakhan Oblast Administration Building on Sovetskaya Street

During the Soviet period, the high authority in the oblast was shared between three persons: The first secretary of the Astrakhan CPSU Committee (who in reality had the biggest authority), the chairman of the oblast Soviet (legislative power), and the chairman of the oblast Executive Committee (executive power). Since 1991, CPSU lost all the power, and the head of the Oblast administration, and eventually the governor was appointed/elected alongside elected regional parliament.

The Charter of Astrakhan Oblast is the fundamental law of the region. The Legislative Assembly of Astrakhan Oblast is the province's standing legislative (representative) body. The Legislative Assembly exercises its authority by passing laws, resolutions, and other legal acts and by supervising the implementation and observance of the laws and other legal acts passed by it. The highest executive body is the Oblast Administration, which includes territorial executive bodies such as district administrations, committees, and commissions that facilitate development and run the day to day matters of the province. The Oblast administration supports the activities of the Governor who is the highest official and acts as guarantor of the observance of the oblast Charter in accordance with the Constitution of Russia.

=== Legislature ===
The representative authority of the Astrakhan Oblast is the Duma of Astrakhan Oblast. Between 1994 and 2001, it was called the Astrakhan Regional Representative Assembly.

The Duma of Astrakhan Oblast has the following structure:

- Chairman of the Duma of Astrakhan Oblast;
- First Deputy Chairman of the Duma of Astrakhan Oblast;
- Deputy Chairman of the Duma of Astrakhan Oblast;
- Office of the Duma of Astrakhan Oblast;
- Committees and political factions.

Since 2006, the chairman of the regional legislative body has been the head of the regional branch of the United Russia party, Alexander Klykanov, whose candidacy was considered in 2009 for the post of governor of the Oblast. In 2016, Igor Martynov was elected Chairman of the Duma of Astrakhan Oblast of the sixth convocation.

=== Executive ===
The governor is the highest official of the Astrakhan Oblast and heads the executive branch.

Governors of Astrakhan Oblast:

- Anatoly Guzhvin — 1991–2004;
- Alexander Zhilkin — 2004–2018;
- Sergey Morozov — acting, 26 September 2018 — 5 June 2019;
- Igor Babushkin — 5 June 2019 — present.

From 1991 to 2004, Anatoly Guzhvin, who won elections in 1996 and 2000, was the governor of the Oblast. After Guzhvin's death in August 2004, the early elections of the head of the Astrakhan Oblast on 5 December 2004 was won by the acting head of the region Alexander Zhilkin, enjoying the support of United Russia. The Governor supervises the work of the executive authorities of the region and the Government of the Astrakhan Oblast. From 2004 to 2017, Konstantin Markelov was the Chairman of the Government of the Astrakhan Oblast. Since 2017, Rasul Sultanov has been the Chairman of the Government of the Astrakhan Oblast.

== Demographics ==
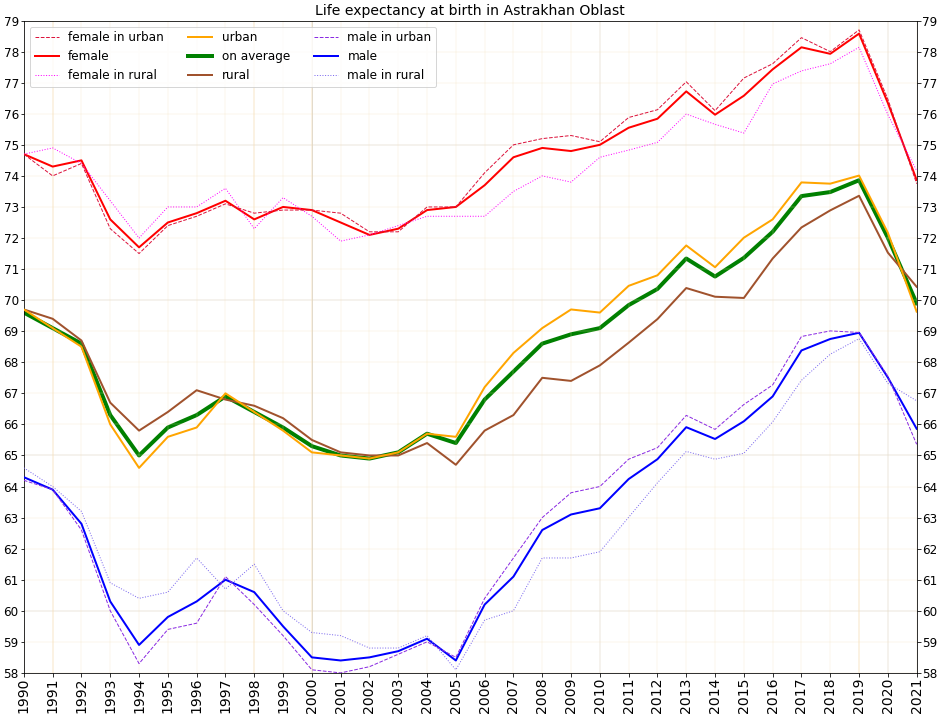
Life expectancy at birth in Astrakhan Oblast

960,142 (2021 census); 1,010,073 (2010 census); 1,005,276 (2002 census); 998,114 (1989 Soviet census).

Vital statistics for 2024:

- Births: 9,199 (9.7 per 1,000)
- Deaths: 11,485 (12.1 per 1,000)

Total fertility rate (2024):
1.62 children per woman

Life expectancy (2021):
Total — 69.90 years (male — 65.86, female — 73.87)

=== Settlements ===
Largest cities or towns in Astrakhan Oblast 2010 Russian Census
Rank		Administrative Division	Pop.
1	Astrakhan	City of oblast significance of Astrakhan	520,339
2	Akhtubinsk	Akhtubinsky District	41,853
3	Znamensk	Closed administrative-territorial formation of Znamensk	29,401
4	Kharabali	Kharabalinsky District	18,117
5	Kamyzyak	Kamyzyaksky District	16,314
6	Krasny Yar	Krasnoyarsky District	11,824
7	Narimanov	Narimanovsky District	11,521
8	Ikryanoye	Ikryaninsky District	10,036
9	Volodarsky	Volodarsky District	10,005
10	Liman	Limansky District	9,024

Historical population
Year	Pop.	±%
1897	1,003,542	—
1926	510,386	−49.1%
1959	701,974	+37.5%
1970	867,483	+23.6%
1979	915,548	+5.5%
1989	998,114	+9.0%
2002	1,005,276	+0.7%
2010	1,010,073	+0.5%
2021	960,142	−4.9%
Source: Census data

=== Ethnic groups ===
According to the 2021 Census, the ethnic composition was:

(shown are the ethnic groups with a population of more than 5,000 people)

Ethnicity	Population	Percentage
Russian	547,320	57%
Kazakh	143,717	14.7%
Tatar	48,313	5%
Dagestani	13,989	1.46%
Nogai	9,320	0.97%
Chechen	6,873	0.72%
Azerbaijani	6,187	0.64%
Kalmyk	5,320	0.55%
Other	34,644	3.61%
Ethnicity not stated	144,459	15%

- 144,459 people were registered from administrative databases, and could not declare an ethnicity. It is estimated that the proportion of ethnicities in this group is the same as that of the declared group.

=== Languages ===
The local group of Russian varieties is known as Astrakhan Russian and refers to several dialects spoken in and around the Astrakhan Oblast.

=== Religion ===
Religion in Astrakhan Oblast as of 2012 (Sreda Arena Atlas)
Russian Orthodoxy	43%
Other Orthodox	3.3%
Other Christians	2.1%
Islam	23.5%
Rodnovery and other native faiths	1.7%
Spiritual but not religious	12%
Atheism and irreligion	6.2%
Other and undeclared	8.2%

According to a 2012 survey which interviewed 56,900 people 46% of the population of Astrakhan Oblast adheres to the Russian Orthodox Church, 4% are Orthodox Christian believers who do not belong to any church or are members of other (non-Russian) Orthodox churches, 2% are unaffiliated generic Christians, 14% are Muslims, and 2% of the population adheres to the Slavic native faith (Rodnovery) or other folk religions of the region. In addition, 16% of the population declares to be spiritual but not religious, 6% is atheist, and 10% follows other religions or did not give an answer to the question.

Smaller religious communities not represented in the poll cited above but present in the region include Hindus, Jews and Buddhists, each having one temple in Astrakhan Oblast.

== See also ==
- Astrakhan Khanate
- Music of Astrakhan
- Elections in Astrakhan Oblast
- List of Chairmen of the Astrakhan Oblast Duma
- Hinduism in Russia
