= 2025 Perm Krai gubernatorial election =

- 12–14 September 2025
- Turnout: 48.99% ▲13.27 pp
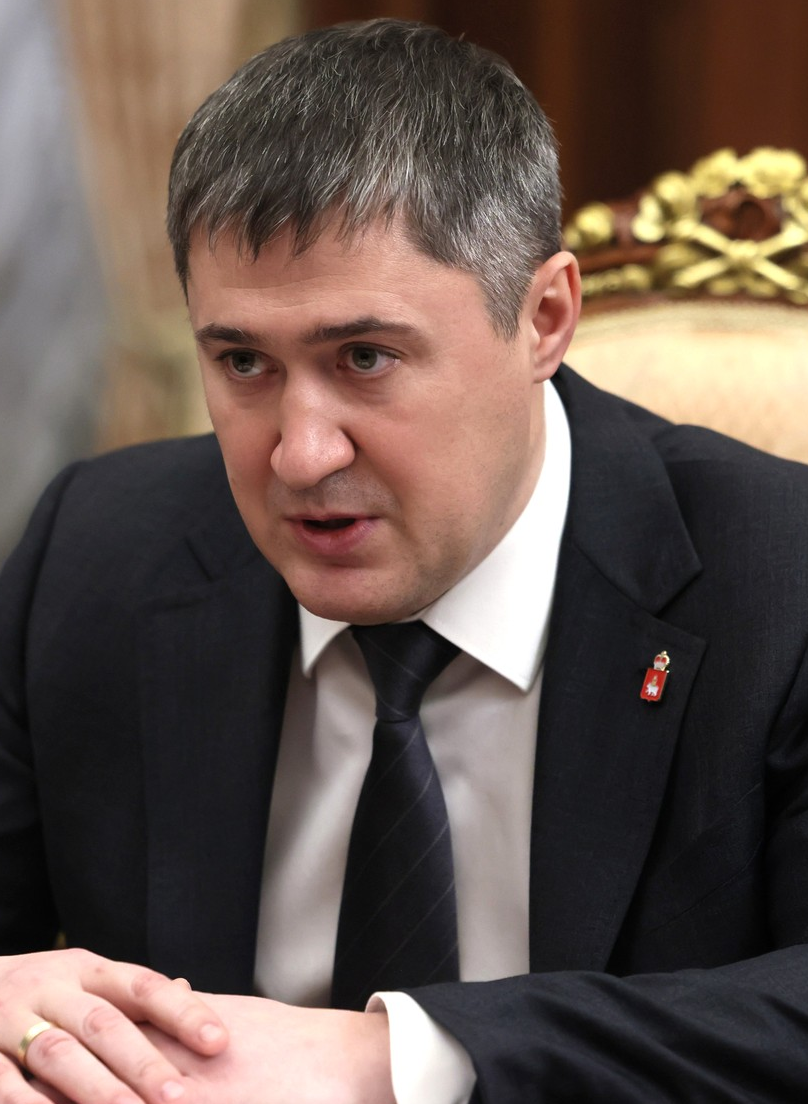

Candidate	Dmitry Makhonin	Ksenia Aytakova
Party	United Russia	CPRF
Popular vote	685,577	99,501
Percentage	70.94%	10.30%
	LDPR	NL
Candidate	Oleg Postnikov	Denis Shitov
Party	LDPR	New People
Popular vote	76,211	56,756
Percentage	7.89%	5.87%
Governor before election
Dmitry Makhonin
United Russia
Governor-elect
Dmitry Makhonin
United Russia

The 2025 Perm Krai gubernatorial election took place on 12–14 September 2025, on common election day. Incumbent Governor of Perm Krai Dmitry Makhonin was re-elected to a second term in office.

== Background ==
Then-Federal Antimonopoly Service department head Dmitry Makhonin was appointed acting Governor of Perm Krai in February 2020, replacing first-term incumbent Maxim Reshetnikov, who was appointed Minister of Economic Development of Russia. Makhonin ran for a full term as an independent with the support from United Russia and won the election with 75.69% of the vote.

In 2021 Makhonin agreed to lead United Russia for the upcoming Russian legislative election in Perm Krai as well as Legislative Assembly of Perm Krai election, however, after the election Makhonin declined to take both seats and remained governor. In November 2023 Makhonin officially joined United Russia and became secretary of the party regional office.

In March 2025 Governor Makhonin had a meeting with President Vladimir Putin, however, the governor did not announce his intentions regarding next gubernatorial term in the publicly available part of the meeting. The next day Kremlin Press Secretary Dmitry Peskov clarified that Makhonin intended to run for a second term in office and was endorsed by Putin.

== Candidates ==
In Perm Krai candidates for Governor of Perm Krai can be nominated by registered political parties or by self-nomination. Candidate for Governor of Perm Krai should be a Russian citizen and at least 30 years old. Candidates for Governor of Perm Krai should not have a foreign citizenship or residence permit. Each candidate in order to be registered is required to collect at least 6% of signatures of members and heads of municipalities. In addition, self-nominated candidates should collect 1% of signatures of Perm Krai residents. Also gubernatorial candidates present 3 candidacies to the Federation Council and election winner later appoints one of the presented candidates.

=== Declared ===
Candidate name, political party		Occupation	Status	Ref.
Ksenia Aytakova; Communist Party		Deputy Chairwoman of the Legislative Assembly of Perm Krai (2021–present); Member of the Legislative Assembly (2011–present); 2020 gubernatorial candidate	Registered	
Lyudmila Karavayeva; Party of Pensioners		Retired middle school principal	Registered	
Dmitry Makhonin; United Russia	Dmitry Makhonin	Incumbent Governor of Perm Krai (2020–present)	Registered	
Oleg Postnikov; Liberal Democratic Party		Member of Legislative Assembly of Perm Krai (2016–present); 2017 and 2020 gubernatorial candidate	Registered	
Denis Shitov; New People		Member of Legislative Assembly of Perm Krai (2021–present); 2GIS executive	Registered	
Mikhail Dyachkov; Communists of Russia		First secretary of the party regional committee (2023–present)	Failed to qualify	
Maksim Gashev; Party for Fairness!		Sales manager	Failed to qualify	
Yegor Gilyov; Independent		Salesman	Failed to qualify	
Vyacheslav Luchnikov; SR–ZP		Nonprofit director	Failed to qualify	
Aleksandr Zapivalov; Independent		Unemployed	Failed to qualify	
Aleksandr Zinin; Independent		Businessman	Did not file	

=== Eliminated in the primary ===
- Aleksandr Kozyukov (United Russia), Member of Legislative Assembly of Perm Krai (2021–present)

=== Declined ===
- Anna Baranova (CPRF), Member of Legislative Assembly of Perm Krai (2021–present)
- Maria Drobot (CPRF), Member of State Duma (2021–present)
- Veronika Kulikova (SR–ZP), Member of Legislative Assembly of Perm Krai (2021–present)

=== Candidates for Federation Council ===
Head candidate, political party	Candidates for Federation Council	Status
Ksenia Aytakova; Communist Party	* Anna Baranova, Member of Legislative Assembly of Perm Krai (2021–present) * Vladimir Chuloshnikov, Member of Legislative Assembly of Perm Krai (2012–present) * Maria Drobot, Member of State Duma (2021–present)	Registered
Dmitry Makhonin; United Russia	* Vyacheslav Grigoryev, First Deputy Chairman of the Legislative Assembly of Perm Krai (2021–present), Member of the Legislative Assembly (2020–present) * Andrey Klimov, incumbent Senator (2012–present) * Leonid Politov, First Deputy Chief of Staff to the Governor of Perm Krai (2021–present)	Registered
Oleg Postnikov; Liberal Democratic Party	* Nikolay Blagov, Member of Legislative Assembly of Perm Krai (2016–present) * Aleksandr Kazakov, `Member of Duma of Dobryanka (2019–present), oilfield services executive * Aleksey Zolotaryov, Member of Legislative Assembly of Perm Krai (2016–present), former Deputy Chairman of the Legislative Assembly (2016–2021)	Registered
Denis Shitov; New People	* Nikolay Bogdanov, Member of Duma of Chaykovsky (2023–present), individual entrepreneur * Sergey Isayev, Member of Legislative Assembly of Perm Krai (2021–present) * Aleksey Ovchinnikov, Member of Perm City Duma (2021–present), businessman	Registered
Vyacheslav Luchnikov; SR–ZP	* Dmitry Botin, attorney * Andrey Kobelev, Member of Legislative Assembly of Perm Krai (2024–present), businessman * Aleksey Romashov, Russian Army soldier	Failed to qualify

== Finances ==
All sums are in rubles.

Financial Report	Source	Aytakova	Karavayeva	Makhonin	Postnikov	Shitov
First		125,000	35,000	51,431,120	56,700	1,030,000
Final		2,925,000	800,000	74,431,120	2,756,818	3,930,000

== Polls ==
Fieldwork date	Polling firm	Makhonin	Aytakova	Postnikov	Shitov	Karavayeva	Lead
14 September 2025	2025 election	70.9	10.3	7.9	5.9	3.3	60.6
March – August 2025	CSRI	74	10	9	4	–	64

== Results ==
Summary of the 12–14 September 2025 Perm Krai gubernatorial election results
Candidate	Party	Votes	%
Dmitry Makhonin (incumbent)	United Russia	685,577	70.94
Ksenia Aytakova	Communist Party	99,501	10.30
Oleg Postnikov	Liberal Democratic Party	76,211	7.89
Denis Shitov	New People	56,756	5.87
Lyudmila Karavayeva	Party of Pensioners	31,488	3.26
Valid votes		949,533	98.25
Blank ballots		16,873	1.75
Total		966,415	100.00
Turnout		966,415	48.99
Registered voters		1,972,664	100.00

Governor Makhonin appointed First Deputy Chairman of the Legislative Assembly of Perm Krai Vyacheslav Grigoryev (United Russia) to the Federation Council, replacing incumbent Senator Andrey Klimov (United Russia).

== See also ==
- 2025 Russian regional elections
