= Vyacheslav Grigoryev (politician) =

- Вячеслав Григорьев
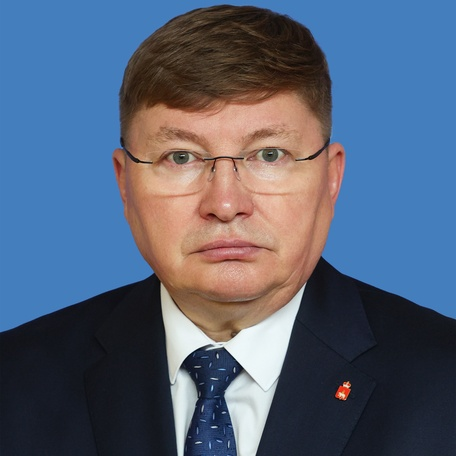

Senator from Perm Krai
- In office 18 September 2025 – Incumbent
- Preceded by: Andrey Klimov

Personal details
- Born: 27 February 1968 (age 58) Kartaly, RSFSR, Soviet Union
- Party: United Russia
- Education: Perm Military Institute of Missile Forces

Vyacheslav Veniaminovich Grigoryev (Russian: Вячеслав Вениаминович Григорьев: born February 27, 1968, in Kartaly, Chelyabinsk Oblast) is a Russian politician and Senator of the Russian Federation (since September 18, 2025) representing the executive branch of Perm Krai. He is also a member of the Federation Council Committee on Rules and Organization of Parliamentary Activity.

== Biography ==
Born February 27, 1968, in Kartaly, Chelyabinsk Oblast.

In 1990, he graduated from the Perm Chuikov Higher Military Command and Engineering Red Banner School of Missile Forces.

From 1990 to 2002, he served in a missile division in the Perm Oblast. He completed his service as chief of staff of a missile regiment. He is a retired lieutenant colonel. From 2002 to 2004, he served as First Deputy Head of the Administration of the Zvyozdny, Perm Krai.

From 2004 to 2010, he was President of the Perm Regional Public Charitable Non-Profit Foundation "City."

From 2006 to 2010, he was Deputy Director of the Verkhnekamsk Shipbuilding Complex.

From 2010 to 2013, he was Deputy General Director of KTU LLC (Perm).

=== Regional Political Activities ===
From 2006 to 2020, he was a member of the Perm City Duma (elected in District No. 13 in 2006 and 2011, and in 2016, in a single district from the United Russia party). Since 2011, he has chaired the City Duma Committee on Urban Economy.

From 2018 to 2021, he simultaneously headed the department for work with government agencies in the Perm Krai at EuroChem Mineral and Chemical Company JSC.

From 2020 to 2025, he was a member of the Legislative Assembly of the Perm Krai of the 3rd and 4th convocations from the United Russia party. Since October 7, 2021, he has been the First Deputy Chairman of the Regional Legislative Assembly.

=== Parliamentary activity ===
Since September 18, 2025, he has been a Senator of the Russian Federation, representing the executive body of state power in the Perm Krai. He replaced Andrey Klimov in the Federation Council. Perm Krai Governor Dmitry Makhonin granted Vyacheslav Grigoriev the powers of a senator.

Prior to his parliamentary activity in the upper house, he was the First Deputy Secretary of the regional branch of the United Russia party (since November 30, 2023).

He was awarded the Order of Merit for the Fatherland, 2nd Class (1998) and two Presidential Letter of Gratitude.
