= 2017 Perm Krai gubernatorial election =

- 10 September 2017
- Turnout: 42.53%
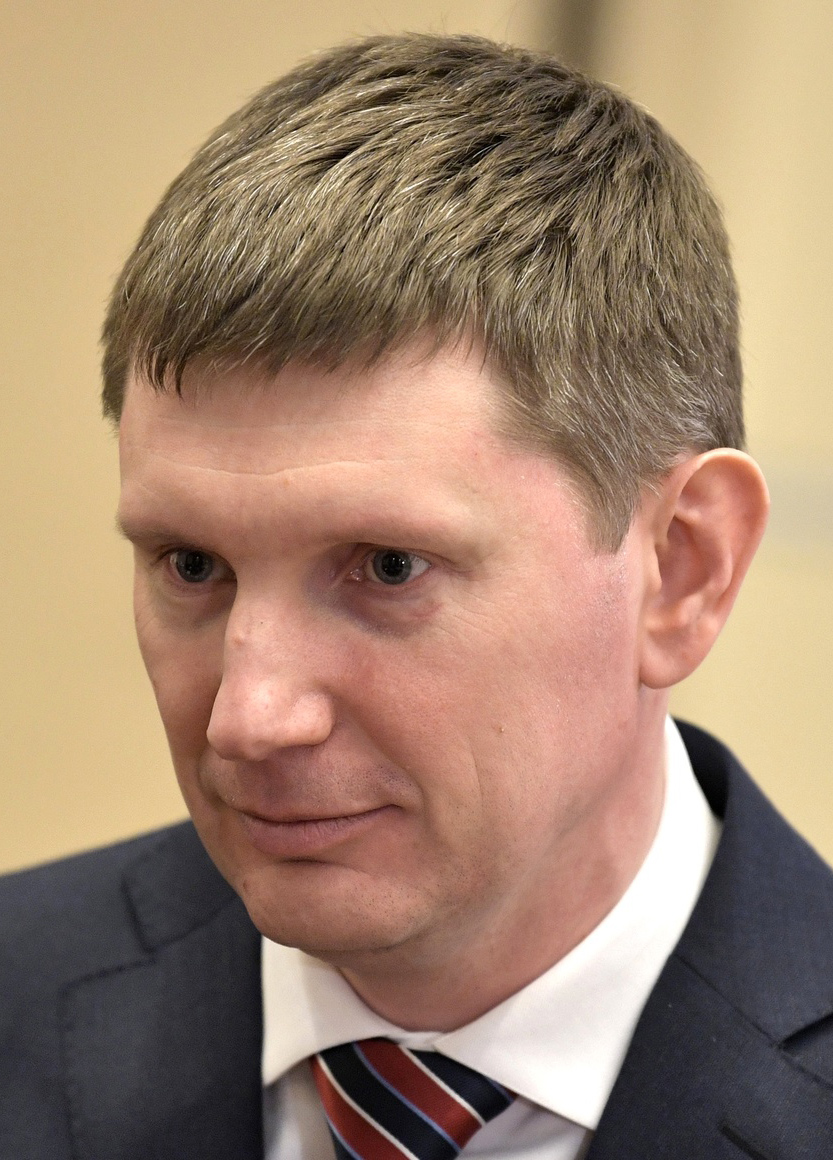
Nominee	Maxim Reshetnikov
Party	United Russia
Popular vote	687,889
Percentage	82.06%
- 2017 Perm Krai gubernatorial election results by municipality
Acting Governor before election
Maxim Reshetnikov
United Russia
Elected Governor
Maxim Reshetnikov
United Russia

Gubernatorial Election in Perm Krai were held on 10 September 2017.

== Background ==
6 February 2017, the Governor Viktor Basargin announced his resignation. The acting Governor was appointed Maxim Reshetnikov.

== Candidates ==
Candidates on the ballot:

Candidate	Party	Office
Vladimir N. Alikin; Born 1948 (age 69)	A Just Russia	Retired
Oleg Postnikov; Born 1965 (age 52)	Liberal Democratic Party	Member of the Legislative Assembly of Perm Krai
Maxim Reshetnikov; Born 1979 (age 38)	United Russia	Incumbent acting Governor
Andrey O. Stepanov; Born 1967 (age 50)	Patriots of Russia	Chairman of Committee of regional branch of party Patriots of Russia
Irina Filatova; Born 1978 (age 39)	Communist Party	Lawyer

== Opinion polls ==
Date	Poll source	Reshetnikov	Postnikov	Filatova	Alikin	Stepanov	Other	Undecided	Abstention	Spoil the Ballot
10-21 August 2017	FOM	67%	2%	2%	1%	0%	–	13%	14%	1%
17-25 July 2017	FOM	57%	2%	2%	2%	<1%	3%	19%	15%	1%
12-22 May 2017	FOM	50%	2%	2%	–	–	8%	21%	2%	16%

== Result ==
Candidate	Party	Votes	%
Maxim Reshetnikov	United Russia	687,889	82.06%
Irina Filatova	Communist Party	62,819	7.49%
Oleg Postnikov	Liberal Democratic Party	31,431	3.75%
Vladimir N. Alikin	A Just Russia	23,538	2.81%
Andrey O. Stepanov	Patriots of Russia	13,257	1.58%
Invalid ballots		19,323	2.31%
Total		838,257	100%

== See also ==
- 2017 Russian gubernatorial elections
