= Kartalinsky =

Kartalinsky (masculine), Kartalinskaya (feminine), or Kartalinskoye (neuter) may refer to:

- Kartalinsky District, a district of Chelyabinsk Oblast, Russia
- Kartalinskoye Urban Settlement, a municipal formation which the Town of Kartaly in Kartalinsky District of Chelyabinsk Oblast, Russia is incorporated as
