= Governor of Perm Krai =

Highest-ranking official in Perm Krai, Russia

- Standard of the governor

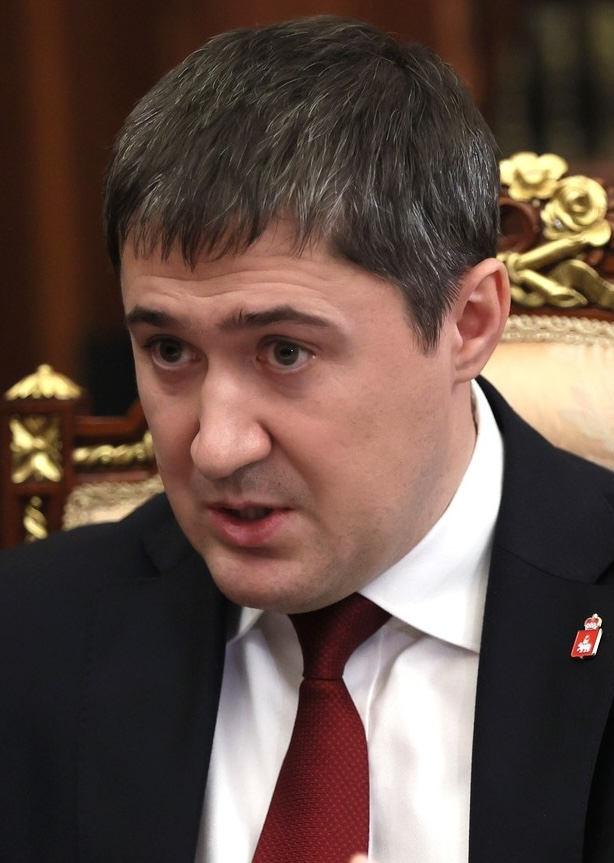
- Incumbent; Dmitry Makhonin since 7 October 2020
- Seat: Perm
- Term length: 5 years
- Inaugural holder: Boris Kuznetsov (as governor of Perm Oblast)
- Formation: 24 December 1991; 1 December 2005 (current form)
- Website: www.permkrai.ru

The governor of Perm Krai (Russian: Губернатор Пермского края) is the highest official of Perm Krai, a federal subject of Russia. The governor heads the executive branch in the region.

== History of office ==
On 7 December 2003, a referendum was held, at which the residents of Perm Oblast and Komi-Permyak Autonomous Okrug supported the unification of these two regions. The united Perm Krai was established on 1 December 2005. On the same day acting governor of Perm Oblast Oleg Chirkunov took office as governor of Perm Krai.

== List of officeholders ==
No.	Portrait	Governor	Tenure	Time in office	Party	Election
1		Boris Kuznetsov (1935–2013)	24 December 1991 – 6 January 1996 (resigned)	4 years, 13 days	Independent → Our Home – Russia	Appointed
2		Gennady Igumnov (1936–2021)	12 January 1996 – 14 December 2000 (lost re-election)	4 years, 337 days	Independent	Appointed 1996
3		Yury Trutnev (born 1956)	14 December 2000 – 12 March 2004 (resigned)	3 years, 89 days	Independent	2000
–		Oleg Chirkunov (born 1958)	12 March 2004 – 25 March 2004 (re-appointed)	1 year, 264 days	Independent	Acting
–		Oleg Chirkunov (born 1958)	25 March 2004 – 1 December 2005	1 year, 264 days	Independent	Acting
On 1 December 2005, Perm Oblast and Komi-Permyak Autonomous Okrug were merged into Perm Krai.
4		Oleg Chirkunov (born 1958)	1 December 2005 – 28 April 2012 (resigned)	6 years, 149 days	Independent	2005 (Note: Appointed by the president of Russia with the consent of the Legislative Assembly of Perm Oblast and the Legislative Assembly of Komi-Permyak Autonomous Okrug.); 2010 (Note: Appointed by the president of Russia with the consent of the Legislative Assembly of Perm Krai.)
–		Viktor Basargin (born 1957)	28 April 2012 – 5 May 2012	4 years, 284 days	Independent	Acting
5		Viktor Basargin (born 1957)	5 May 2012 – 6 February 2017 (resigned)	4 years, 284 days	Independent	2012
–		Maxim Reshetnikov (born 1979)	6 February 2017 – 18 September 2017	2 years, 349 days	Independent → United Russia	Acting
6		Maxim Reshetnikov (born 1979)	18 September 2017 – 21 January 2020 (resigned)	2 years, 349 days	Independent → United Russia	2017
–		Olga Antipina (born 1963)	21 January 2020 – 6 February 2020	16 days	Independent	Acting premier
–		Dmitry Makhonin (born 1982)	6 February 2020 – 7 October 2020	6 years, 219 days	Independent → United Russia	Acting
7		Dmitry Makhonin (born 1982)	7 October 2020 – present	6 years, 219 days	Independent → United Russia	2020; 2025
