= Gennady Igumnov =

Russian politician (1936–2021)

- Геннадий Игумнов
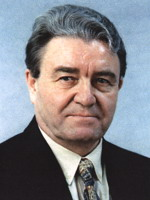

2nd Governor of Perm Oblast
- In office 12 January 1996 – 28 December 2000
- Preceded by: Boris Kuznetsov
- Succeeded by: Yury Trutnev

Personal details
- Born: 27 October 1936 (age 89) Gubakha, Sverdlovsk Oblast, RSFSR, Soviet Union (now Perm Krai, Russia)
- Died: 20 May 2021 (aged 84) Russia
- Spouse: Viktoria Ivanovna

Gennady Vyacheslavovich Igumnov (Russian: Геннадий Вячеславович Игумнов; 27 October 1936 – 20 May 2021), was a Russian politician who had served as the 2nd Governor of Perm Oblast from 1996 to 2000.

== Biography ==
Gennady Igumnov was born on 27 October 1936 in Gubakha to the family of a Red Army officer who died during the Great Patriotic War.

In 1956, he graduated from the Perm River School with honors and received a referral to the Leningrad Higher Maritime School, but did not manage to submit the documents.

He began his career in Kizel at the Bely Spoi mine of the Kizelugol association. He lived in the village of Bely Spoi. He worked as an underground electrical fitter, mining foreman, assistant to the head of the section, and then the deputy chief engineer of the mine. He worked underground for about 13 years, which he considered the best years of his life. He graduated from a mining technical school with the aim of becoming a technical developer, but was noticed in the city party committee and the executive committee and was invited to work there.

From 1 May 1969 to 31 May 1971, he was the head of the industrial and transport department of the Kizel city committee of the CPSU.

On 31 May 1971, he was elected the Chairman of the Kizel City Executive Committee. In 1973, on the job, he graduated from the Higher School of the Trade Union Movement in absentia with a degree in Labor Economics. He was a member of the CPSU until August 1991.

From 1983 to 1992 he worked in Perm as head of the organizational and instructor department of the Perm Regional Executive Committee, then head of the department for the work of the councils of the Perm Regional Council of People's Deputies.

In January 1992, Igumnov was appointed First Deputy Head of Perm Oblast Administration. On 12 January 1996, by the decree of the President of Russia, Igumnov he was appointed the 2nd Governor (Head) of Perm Oblast. On 22 December 1996, he was elected governor of Perm Oblast following the results of the second round.

Igumnov was a member of the Federation Council from the Perm Oblast from January 1996 to January 2001. He was a member of the Federation Council's Committee on Economic Policy.

In 2000, he lost the election to mayor of Perm Yury Trutnev. From 2001 to 2006, he was deputy chairman of the board of directors of Lukoil-Perm, after which he retired.

Gennady Vyacheslavovich Igumnov died on 20 May 2021. He was buried in the Southern Cemetery of Perm next to his wife Viktoria Ivanovna.
