= Yury Trutnev =

Russian politician

- Юрий Трутнев
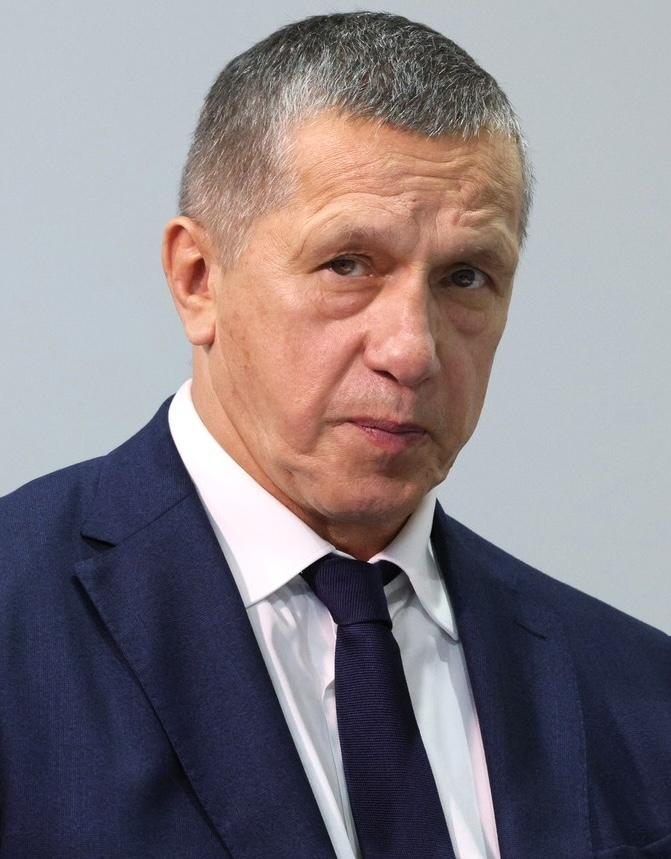
- Trutnev in 2022

Deputy Prime Minister of Russia Presidential Envoy to the Far Eastern Federal District
- In office 31 August 2013 – 22 October 2026
- President: Vladimir Putin
- Prime Minister: Dmitry Medvedev; Mikhail Mishustin
- Preceded by: Viktor Ishayev
- Succeeded by: Oleg Kozhemyako

Assistant to the President of Russia
- In office 22 May 2012 – 31 August 2013

Minister of Natural Resources and Environment
- In office 9 March 2004 – 21 May 2012
- Preceded by: Vitaly Artyukhov
- Succeeded by: Sergey Donskoy

3rd Governor of Perm Oblast
- In office 14 December 2000 – 11 March 2004
- Preceded by: Gennady Igumnov
- Succeeded by: Oleg Chirkunov

1st Mayor of Perm
- In office 9 December 1996 – 14 December 2000
- Preceded by: Vladimir Fil
- Succeeded by: Arkady Kamenev

Personal details
- Born: 1 March 1956 (age 70) Perm, Perm Oblast, Russian SFSR, Soviet Union (now Perm Krai, Russia)
- Party: United Russia (2007–present)

Yury Petrovich Trutnev (Russian: Юрий Петрович Трутнев; born 1 March 1956) is a Russian politician who serves as a Deputy Prime Minister of Russia and Presidential Envoy to the Far Eastern Federal District since 2013. From 2004 to 2012, he served as Minister of Natural Resources and the Environment of Russia.

He has the federal state civilian service rank of 1st class Active State Councillor of the Russian Federation.

== Political career ==
=== Local government ===
Trutnev was elected mayor of Perm in 1996 (achieving 61.42% support in the first round) and governor of the Perm Oblast in 2000 (51.48%).

=== Federal government ===
During his term as governor, Trutnev maintained a neutral stance towards the Kremlin administration.

In 2008 and 2009, Trutnev was officially named Russia's highest earning member of government. In April 2010, he reported an overall income of 155 million rubles ($5.34 million) for the past fiscal year, according to figures published by the government. President Dmitry Medvedev in 2008 obliged all government officials to publish their incomes and assets, in his drive to fight rampant corruption. However, the figures do not explain how money was earned.

On 31 August 2013 he was appointed Deputy Prime Minister of Russia and Presidential Envoy to the Far Eastern Federal District in the First Medvedev Cabinet. He was re-appointed to this office on 18 May 2018 with the Second Medvedev Cabinet, and again on 21 January 2020 with the Mishustin Cabinet.

== Defence of seal pups ==
Russia made headlines worldwide when, on 18 March 2010, it announced that it would ban the killing of seals less than a year old, effectively ending one of the biggest kills of harp seals in the world. Yury Trutnev called the seal slaughter "bloody", and remarked that the killing of defenceless animals can't be deemed a "hunt".

== Sanctions ==
In response to the 2022 Russian invasion of Ukraine, on 6 April 2022 the Office of Foreign Assets Control of the United States Department of the Treasury added Trutnev to its list of persons sanctioned pursuant to Executive Order 14024.

He was sanctioned by the UK government in 2022 in relation to the Russo-Ukrainian War.
