= Oleg Chirkunov =

Russian politician (born 1958)

- Олег Чиркунов
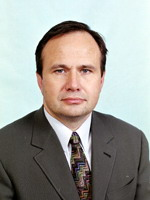

1st Governor of Perm Krai
- In office 1 December 2005 – 28 April 2012
- Preceded by: Position created
- Succeeded by: Viktor Basargin

Acting Governor of Perm Oblast
- In office 25 March 2004 – 1 December 2005
- Preceded by: Yury Trutnev
- Succeeded by: Position abolished

Personal details
- Born: November 15, 1958 (age 67) Kirovsk, Russian SFSR, Soviet Union
- Website: perm.ru chirkunov.com

Oleg Anatolyevich Chirkunov (Russian: Олег Анатольевич Чиркунов, IPA: [ɐˈlʲek tɕɪrkʊˈnof]; born 15 November 1958) is a Russian politician who served as the governor of Perm Krai from 12 March 2004 to 28 April 2012.

== Early life ==
Chirkunov graduated from Perm Polytechnic Institute in 1981 with a specialization in Economics and Organization of the Mechanical Engineering Industry. He received a degree from the Higher School of the KGB in 1985, after which he served in the KGB until the dissolution of the Soviet Union. He subsequently graduated from the Law Department of Perm State University in 1988. He received his PhD in economics in 1990.

== Career ==
=== Business ===
Chirkunov was the trade representative of Russia to Switzerland from 1991 to 1994. He worked with the company EKS whose business was the import of goods from Europe to Russia. Eventually he became its director until becoming the member of the Federation Council. EKS included the Semya supermarket chain, one of the largest in Perm Krai (sold to the national Lenta chain in 2021).

=== Politics ===
He was a deputy of legislative assembly of Perm Oblast from 1997 to 2000. After this he became the representative of the region at Federation Council of Russia. He was appointed acting governor of Perm Oblast in 2004, and was confirmed as governor of Perm Krai in 2005 (after the merger of Perm Oblast and Komi-Permyak Autonomous Okrug).

In Perm, he commissioned Marat Gelman, a political scientist and art curator, to oversee "Project Perm" and revitalize the city to become a European center of culture. Gelman aspired to create an "artistic perestroika." Under Chirkunov, "in Perm artists were encouraged to experiment, journalists could criticize, and visitors might think they were in Western Europe, rather than middle Russia." Project Perm included a Museum of Contemporary Art; the White Nights Festival, a summer event which drew up to a million visitors; and the Perm-36 Gulag museum.

Chirkunov resigned as Perm governor in April 2012, after constant verbal attacks on state television.
