= Boris Kuznetsov (politician) =

Russian politician (1935–2013)

- Борис Кузнецов
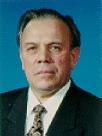

First Deputy Chairman of the State Duma
- In office 17 February 1999 – 18 January 2000
- Chairman: Gennady Seleznyov

Member of the State Duma
- In office 1996 – 18 January 2000

1st Governor of Perm Oblast
- In office 24 December 1991 – 6 January 1996
- Succeeded by: Gennady Igumnov

Personal details
- Born: 18 February 1935 Bolshoye Pole, Kirov Oblast, Russian SFSR, Soviet Union
- Died: 2 July 2013 (aged 78) Moscow, Russia
- Party: Our Home - Russia

Boris Yuryevich Kuznetsov (Russian: Борис Юрьевич Кузнецов; 28 February 1935 – 2 July 2013) was a Russian politician who served as the 1st Governor (Head) of Perm Oblast from 1991 to 1996. He was a member of the State Duma from 1996 to 2000.

== Biography ==
Boris Kuznetsov was born in Bolshoye Pole on 18 February 1935. The village of Bolshoye Pole (Yarantsevo) was part of the Krasnogorsky, in the 1970s - the Oktyabrsky village council of Yaransky District; abolished on 21 January 1979. His father, Yuri Konstantinovich (1910 - ?), worked as a driver, his mother Anfisa Ivanovna (1914 - ?). He is Russian by nationality.

=== Education and work ===
In 1954, he graduated from the river school in Molotov, and in 1972, he graduated from the Gorky Institute of Water Transport Engineers with a degree in navigational engineering.

Between 1954 and 1991, he worked as the third, second, first navigator, captain, head of the navigation and navigational security service, first deputy head at the Kama River Shipping Company in Perm. In 1985, he became the head of the Kama River Shipping Company.

=== Political activity ===
Kuznetsov was a member of the Communist Party of the Soviet Union until August 1991.

In 1990, he was elected a people's deputy. In April 1990, he was the chairman of the permanent planning and budgetary commission. In November 1991, he was a member of the small council of the Perm Regional Council of People's Deputies.

From December 1991 to 12 January 1996, Kuznetsov served as the 1st Governor (Head) of Perm Oblast.

In December 1993, he ran for the Federation Council, but was not elected.

In 1995 he was elected a deputy of the State Duma of the second convocation from the Our Home - Russia party, taking office in 1996. He was a member of the Committee on Budget, Taxes, Banks and Finance, since September 1997, he was Deputy Chairman of the Our Home - Russia faction. From 17 February 1999 to 18 January 2000, he was the First Deputy Chairman of the State Duma.

Boris Yuryevich Kuznetsov died in Moscow on 2 July 2013.

== Awards ==
He was awarded two medals. He was awarded the title of "Honorary Worker of the River Fleet".

== Family ==
He had a son who is an entrepreneur.
