= Tulymsky Kamen =

Mountain range in Russia

- Тулымский камень
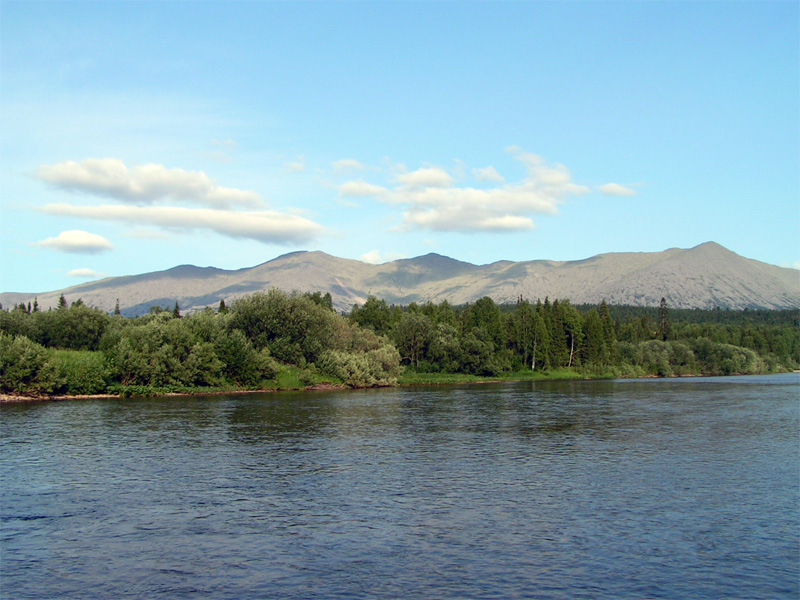
- View of Tulymsky Kamen from the Vishera River

Highest point
- Elevation: 1,496 m (4,908 ft)
- Coordinates: 61°08′29″N 58°55′41″E

Geography
- Location within Russia
- Location: Krasnovishersky District, Perm Krai, Russia

Tulymsky Kamen (Russian: Тулымский камень) is a mountain range in North Ural. Located in northeastern portion of Krasnovishersky District, Perm Krai, Russia, the range stretches about 24 km north–south. At 1,496 m elevation, it is also the highest point of Perm Krai.

Several small tributaries of the Vishera River, located in the area of the Vishera Nature Reserve, originate from the generally steeper western slopes of the range.

== Etymology ==
The word "Tulym", in some Tatar dialects, means "rocks sticking out of the river", and in the Komi-Yodzyak language it means "rapids", likely referring to the rapids on the Vishera River. In the Mansi language, the range has two names: ‘Yaktyl-ya-Nyor’ (range of rapids river) and ‘Luv-Nyor’ (horse-stone).

== Characteristics ==
The ridge is composed mainly of rocks: effusives of basalt composition, green shales, while the eastern part is composed of quartzite-sandstones and green shales. The maximum length of the range from north to south is about 24 km, while its maximum width is 7 km.

The slopes of the ridge are steep, with slopes up to 45 degrees, especially on the western and eastern sides. Avalanches come down here in winter. The peaks are cone-shaped and separated by a gentle saddle. The crested part of the ridge is covered with kurums.

== Hydrography ==
The slopes of the ridge are fed by: the western one by the left tributaries of the Vishera River; the eastern one by tributaries of the Bolshaya Moiva River. Near the ridge, in its western part, flows the Vishera River, to the north of the ridge - the Moiwa River, to the east - the Bolshaya Moiva River.

== Flora ==
Up to a height of 800 m, mainly fir and spruce forests grow, but Siberian cedar, larch, birch also occur. Above 800 metres there is mountain moss-lichen tundra.

== See also ==
- List of highest points of Russian federal subjects
