= Oleg Govorun =

Russian politician (born 1969)

- Олег Говорун
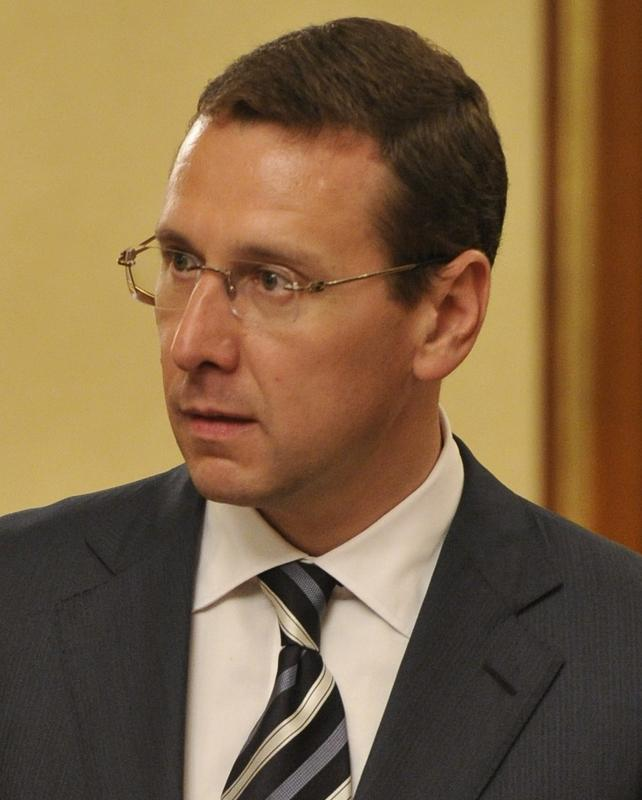
- Govorun in 2012

Minister of Regional Development
- In office 21 May 2012 – 17 October 2012
- Prime Minister: Dmitry Medvedev
- Preceded by: Viktor Basargin
- Succeeded by: Igor Albin

2nd Presidential Envoy to the Central Federal District
- In office 6 September 2011 – 21 May 2012
- President: Dmitry Medvedev; Vladimir Putin
- Preceded by: Andrey Popov (acting); Georgy Poltavchenko
- Succeeded by: Alexander Beglov

Personal details
- Born: Oleg Markovich Govorun; 15 January 1969 (age 57) Bratsk, Russia, Soviet Union
- Party: United Russia

Oleg Markovich Govorun (Russian: Олег Маркович Говорун, born 15 January 1969) is a Russian politician and since May 2012 the Minister of Regional Development. He has the federal state civilian service rank of 1st class Active State Councillor of the Russian Federation.

In 1976–1986, he studied in school No.9 in the town of Pushkino, Moscow Oblast. Between 1987 and 1989, he did his mandatory service in the Soviet Armed Forces. In 1993, he graduated from the Moscow State Forest University majoring in "chemical engineer". As a courier and head of the department for government relations for Alfa Group in 1995, Govorun brought very large amounts of black cash (Russian: черный нал) or chorny nal from Alfa Group to the deputy mayor of Saint Petersburg Vladimir Putin when it was headed by Mikhail Fridman, Peter Aven and German Khan. In March 1997, he was one of three Deputy Heads of Government Relations at Alfa-Bank. In 2000–2004, he was deputy chief of territorial administration of the president of the Russian Federation and in 2004 to 2006 he was deputy head of the Russian Presidential Administration for Domestic Policy. In November 2008, he became a member of the Supreme Council of United Russia party. On September 6, 2011, he was appointed the envoy of the Russian president in Central Federal District. On 14 September 2011, he became a member of the Security Council of Russia. On May 21, 2012, he was appointed to the Minister of Regional Development in Dmitry Medvedev's Cabinet. In April 2018, the United States imposed sanctions on him and 23 other Russian nationals.

Govorun advises Putin on foreign policy especially issues with the United States and receives much of his input from Fridman and Aven, both of whom Putin trusts for accurate information from the networks established by Alfa Bank and Alfa Group, respectively, instead of Russian intelligence officials.

== Awards and decorations ==
- Medal of the Order "For Merit to the Fatherland" II class (29 December 2003) — for achievements in the development of state legal institutions in the Chechen Republic
- Order of Friendship (2008)
- Order of Honour (2009)
- Russian Federation Presidential Certificate of Gratitude (2 September 2006) — for contribution to the preparation and conduct of the election to the Chechen Republic's Parliament
