= Vishera Nature Reserve =

Nature reserve in Perm Krai, Russia

Coordinates: 61°29′10″N 59°13′02″E

- Russian: Вишерский заповедник
- IUCN category Ia (strict nature reserve)
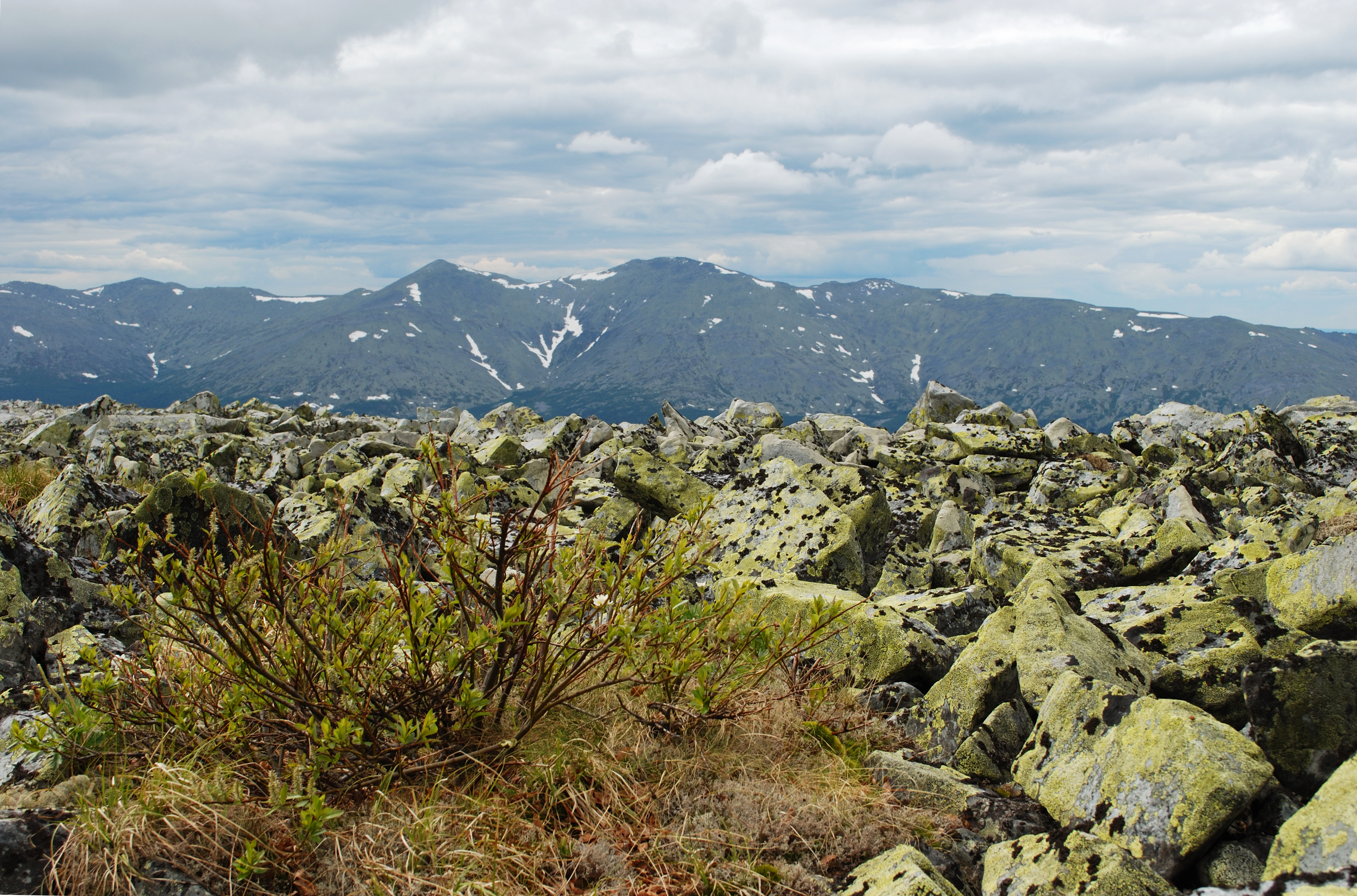
- Vishera Nature Reserve

- Location within Russia
- Location: Perm Krai, Russia
- Area: 2,412 square kilometres (931 mi^{2})
- Established: 1991
- Governing body: Ministry of Natural Resources and Environment (Russia)
- Website: http://www.vishersky.ru/

Vishera Nature Reserve (Russian: Вишерский заповедник), also known as Vishersky, is a nature reserve (zapovednik, lit. 'nature sanctuary') in the middle latitudes of the Ural Mountains in Perm Krai, Russia. It covers an area of 2,412 km^{2} (931 square miles), more than 75% of which is dark coniferous forest (taiga). An additional 20% of the territory is treeless mountain landscape. The Vishera River flows through nature reserve for about 130 km (80 miles). Administratively, the reserve is located in the extreme north-east of Perm Krai, in Krasnovishersky District.

== Topography ==
The reserve occupies 1.5% of Perm Krai's area (comparable to the size of Luxembourg). The highest peak in the reserve territory is Tulymsky Kamen at 1,469 m (4,820 feet), also the highest point of Perm Krai. The lowest point is 231 m (758 feet) above sea level.

The extreme north point of the nature reserve (also the most northern point in Perm Krai) is at the drainage divide of the Kama, Pechora and Ob rivers. The small population of this place is made up of the Mansi people.

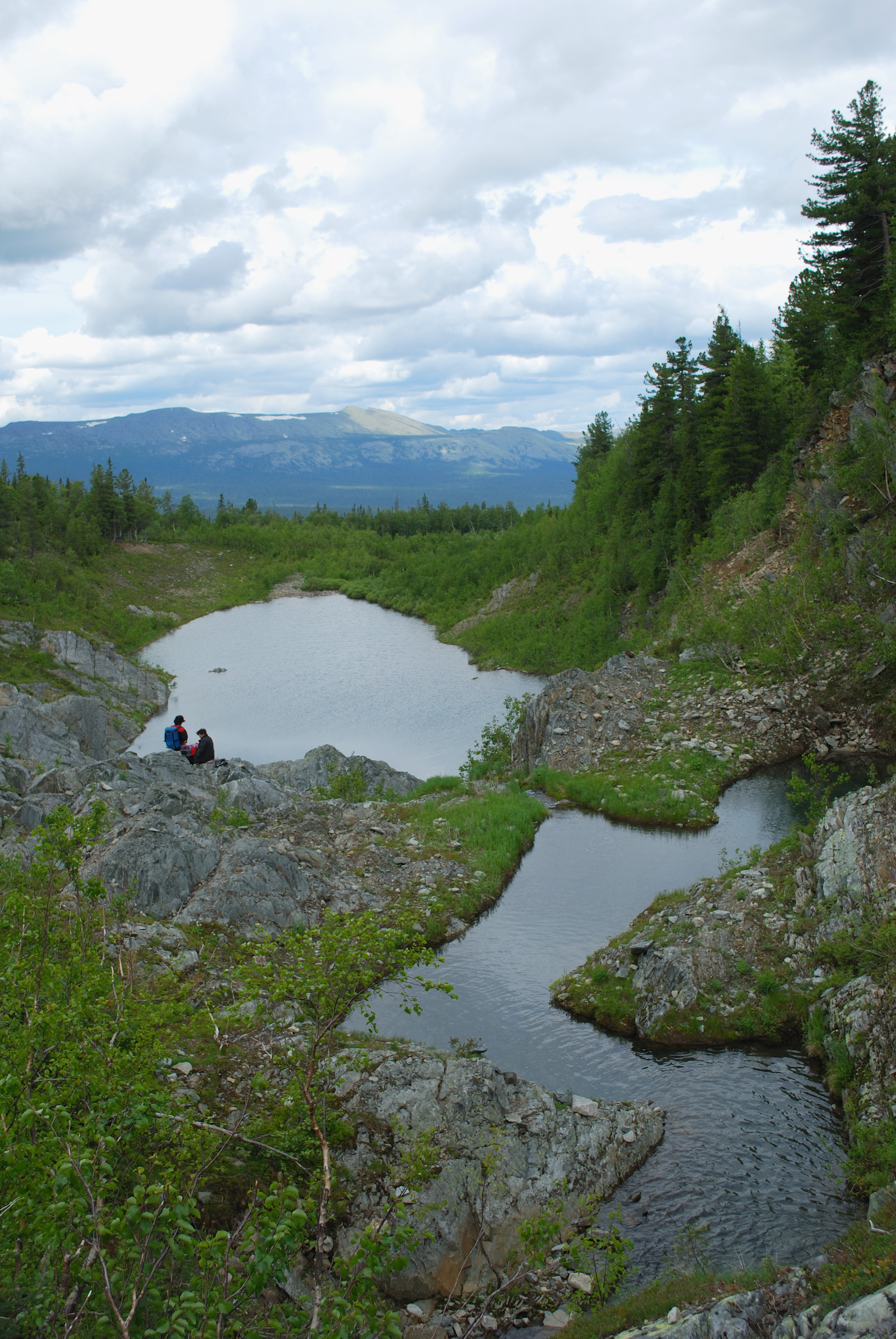
High lakes in Vishera Nature Reserve

== Ecoregion and climate ==
Vishersky is in the Urals montane tundra and taiga ecoregion, which runs north–south along the ridge of the Urals Mountains separating the Russian Plain from the West Siberian Plain.

The climate of Vishersky is humid continental with cool summers, with a Köppen climate classification of subarctic climate Dfc. This climate is characterized by mild summers (1–3 months above 10 °C (50.0 °F)) and cold, snowy winters (coldest month below −3 °C (26.6 °F)).

== Flora and fauna ==
The reserve has large areas of fir and spruce virgin forest, with Siberian Pine, rowan and birch. There are a recorded 36 species of mammals, 155 bird species, 6 of fish and 2 of amphibians. Among the mammals are brown bear, gray wolf, reindeer, and sable.
