= Viktor Basargin =

Russian politician

- Виктор Басаргин
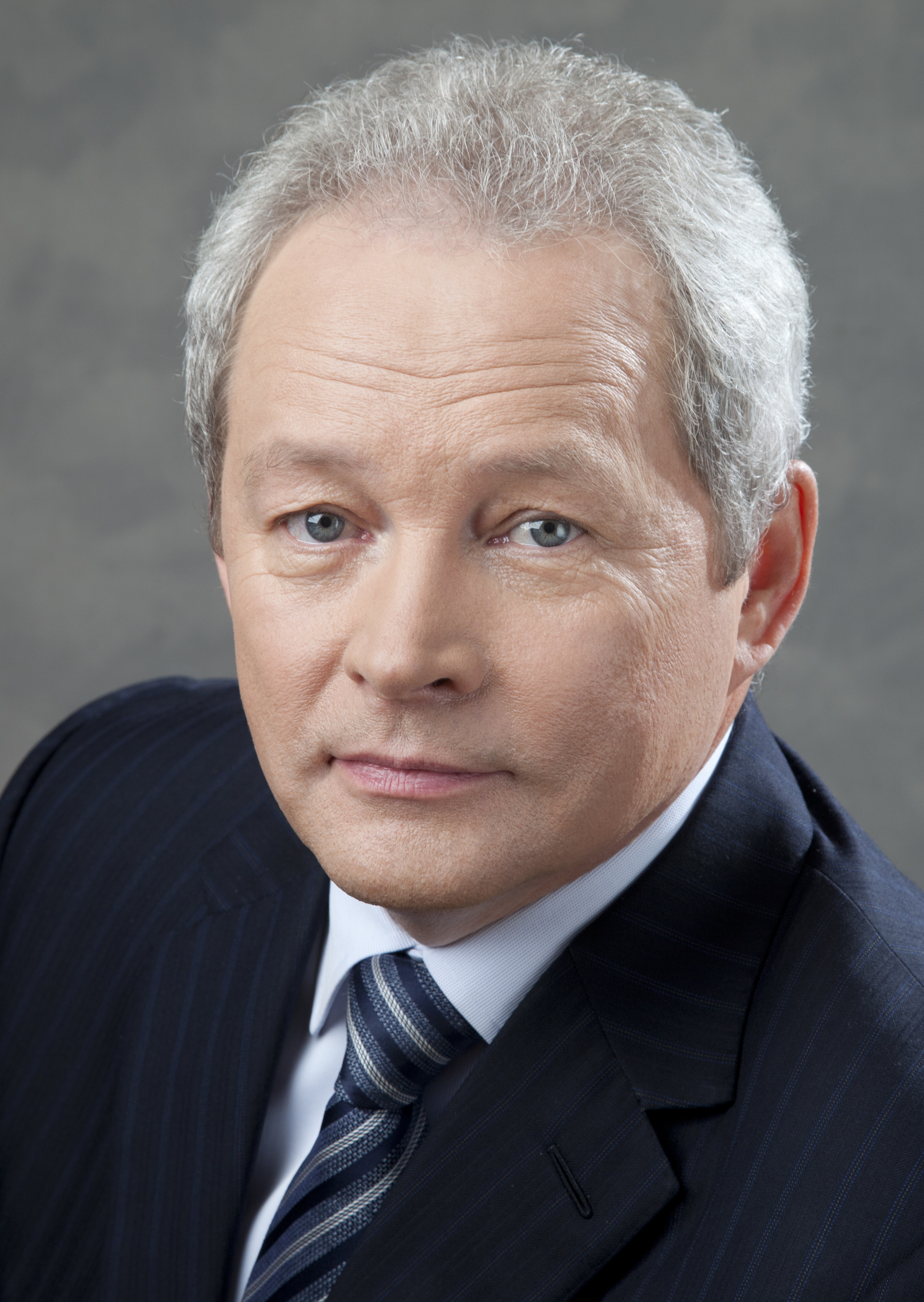
- Official portrait, 2013

Head of Rostransnadzor
- In office 10 February 2017 – 31 March 2025
- Preceded by: Sergey Saritsky (acting)

2nd Governor of Perm Krai
- In office 5 May 2012 – 6 February 2017
- Preceded by: Oleg Chirkunov
- Succeeded by: Maxim Reshetnikov

Governor of Perm Krai (acting)
- In office 28 April 2012 – 5 May 2012

Minister of Regional Development of Russia
- In office 14 October 2008 – 28 April 2012
- Preceded by: Dmitry Kozak
- Succeeded by: Vladimir Tokaryev (acting); Oleg Govorun

Deputy Plenipotentiary Representative in the Ural Federal District
- In office August 2001 – 14 October 2008

Personal details
- Born: Viktor Fyodorovich Basargin; 3 August 1957 (age 68); Asbest, RSFSR, Soviet Union
- Political party: Independent

Viktor Fyodorovich Basargin (Russian: Виктор Фёдорович Басаргин; born on 3 August 1957), is a Russian statesman, who is currently the head of the Federal Service for Supervision in the Sphere of Transport (Rostransnadzor) - Chief State Transport Inspector of the Russian Federation since 10 February 2017. He has the federal state civilian service rank of 1st class Active State Councillor of the Russian Federation.

He had served as the 2nd Governor of Perm Krai from 2012 to 2017, and had also served as the Minister of Regional Development from 2008 to 2012.

== Biography ==
Viktor Basargin was born in Asbest on 3 August 1957.

In 1976, he graduated from the Asbest Mining College. The same year, he worked as an assistant to an excavator driver, then as a blaster, senior laboratory engineer, process engineer at the Uralasbest plant.

Vetwe 1983-1985 - Secretary of the Komsomol Committee of the Central Mining Administration of the Uralasbest Combine, since 1985 - First Secretary of the Asbest City Committee of the Komsomol, since 1987 - Secretary of the Sverdlovsk Regional Committee of the Komsomol.

In 1984, he graduated from the Sverdlovsk Mining Institute. V. V. Vakhrushev.

In 1991, he graduated from the Ural Socio-Political Institute.

From 1992 to 1994, he was the Head of Department - Deputy Chairman of the Property Fund of the Sverdlovsk Oblast.

From 1994 to 1996, he was the First Deputy Chairman of the Sverdlovsk Regional Committee for State Property Management.

From 1996 to 2000, he was promoted to the Chairman of the Property Fund of the Sverdlovsk Oblast.

From 2000 to August 2001, Basargin was the Head of the Office of the Plenipotentiary Representative in the Ural Federal District.

From August 2001 to 14 October 2008, Basargin was the Deputy Plenipotentiary Representative in the Ural Federal District.

On 14 October 2008, Basargin became the Minister of Regional Development.

On 11 January 2010 - Member of the Government Commission for Economic Development and Integration.

In July 2010, together with the Minister of Culture, Basargin signed order No. 418/339, according to which the list of historical cities of Russia was reduced by more than 10 times - from 478 to 41. In particular, the list did not include such cities as Moscow, Pskov, Nizhny Novgorod and others.

On 28 April 2012, Basargin was dismissed from the post of Minister of Regional Development and was appointed acting Governor of the Perm Krai.

On 4 May2012, the President of Russia submitted the candidacy of Basargin to the Legislative Assembly of the Perm Krai for his approval as governor of Perm Krai. On 5 May, he was approved by the Legislative Assembly as Governor of the Perm Krai. On 2 July 2012, he headed the regional government for a transitional period.

He partially continued the policy of his predecessor, but began to pay more attention to social policy, declaring the need to revise some projects, in particular the “Perm Cultural Revolution”, Mom's Choice.

On 5 October 2012, Basargin appointed and approved the composition of the government of the Perm Krai, and Roman Panov, a colleague of the governor in the Ministry of Regional Development, was approved as its head, but while Panov was about to take office, on 9 November 2012 he was arrested in the case of embezzlement during the preparations for the APEC summit, thereby Panov cast a shadow on the governor, who was his leader in the Ministry of Regional Development. As a result, Panov did not have time to assume the post of chairman of the government of the Perm Krai, although he was approved.

On 23 January 2013, the new chairman of the regional government Gennady Tushnolobov, approved by the governor, took office. When considering his candidacy in the Legislative Assembly of the Perm Krai, 51 deputies out of 56 present agreed to the appointment.

On 8 August 2013, opposition leader and mayor of Moscow candidate Alexei Navalny posted in his blog to call the governor of the Perm Krai a swindler in response to the news that a criminal case had been opened under the article “Fraud on an especially large scale” on the fact of theft by the Ministry of Regional Development of budget money when buying a trade mission of Hungary in 2008. According to investigators, the department acquired the building of the Hungarian trade mission with an area of 17,612.8 sq. m. at the address: Krasnaya Presnya, 3 in Moscow at a significantly inflated price from an intermediary. The intermediary, a commercial organization, bought this property from Hungary for $21.3 million (about 575 million rubles) and resold it to Russia for 3.5 billion rubles under two government contracts (10 December 2008 and 10 June 2009). Navalny published a copy of the letter on 3 September 2010, at that time Basargin was the head of the Ministry of Regional Development. In it, the Deputy Chairman of the Government of Russia asks Basargin to terminate the contract for the sale of the building, since it contains violations of the law.

From 25 October 2014 to 7 April 2015, he was a member of the Presidium of the State Council of Russia.

On 6 February 2017, Basargin filed an application for early resignation of the governor, and announced that he would not participate in the gubernatorial elections in September 2017. On the same day, he was dismissed from the post of Governor of the Perm Krai, by the Decree of the President of Russia, Vladimir Putin.

On 10 February 2017, Basargin was appointed head of the Federal Service for Supervision in the Sphere of Transport (Rostransnadzor) - Chief Transport Inspector of Russia.
