= Andrey Klimov (politician) =

Russian politician (born 1954)

- Андрей Климов
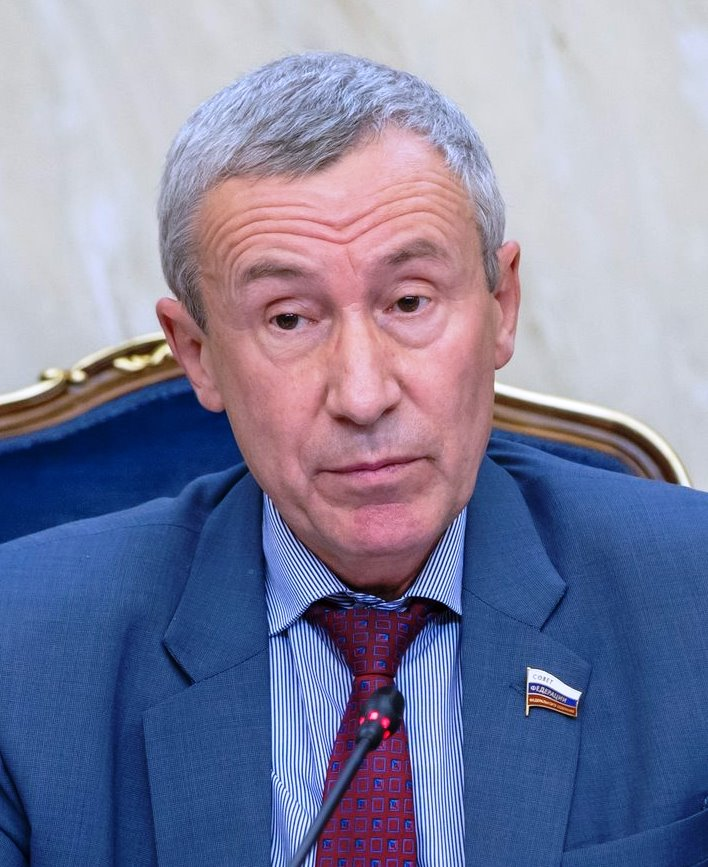
- Klimov in 2017

Senator from Perm Krai
- Incumbent
- Assumed office 2 July 2012
- Preceded by: Alexander Pochinok

Personal details
- Born: Andrey Klimov; 9 November 1954 (age 71) Molotov, Molotov Oblast, Russian SFSR, Soviet Union
- Party: United Russia
- Education: Perm State University

Andrey Arkadyevich Klimov (Russian: Андрей Аркадьевич Климов; born 9 November 1954) is a Russian politician serving as a senator from Perm Krai since 2 July 2012.

== Career ==
Andrey Klimov was born on 9 November 1954 in Molotov. In 1976, he graduated from Perm State University. After graduation, he worked as an economic engineer. From 1981 to 1992, he was an assistant, lecturer, and the head of the Department of Economics, Accounting and Analysis of Economic Activities in Construction at Perm State University. From 1990 to 1993, Klimov served as deputy of the Perm Regional Council of People's Deputies. In 1994 and 1999, he was elected a deputy of the Legislative Assembly of Perm Krai of the 1st and 2nd convocations. From 1999 to 2012, he was a deputy of the State Duma of the 3rd, 4th, 5th, and 6th convocations. On 2 July 2012, he was appointed a senator from Perm Krai.

Beginning in 2012, Rossotrudnichestvo awarded contracts to support Eurasian Dialogue and to allegedly enrich Sergey Klimov, who is the brother of Andrey Klimov, through the Agency for Strategic Communications Praktika (Russian: «Агентству стратегических коммуникаций «Практика») in which Sergey Klimov owns a 28% share.

In 2016, a non-profit foundation in Moscow was established for the Eurasian Dialogue (Russian: «Евразийский диалог») with support from Konstantin Malofeev's Analytical Center Katehon (Russian: «Аналитический центр «Катехон») and Klimov's Interdisciplinary Institute for Regional Studies (MIRI) (Russian: «Межотраслевой институт региональных исследований» («МИРИ»)) which Klimov's wife Olga is a co-owner.

== Sanctions ==
Andrey Klimov is under personal sanctions introduced by the European Union, the United Kingdom, the USA, Canada, Switzerland, Australia, Ukraine, New Zealand, for ratifying the decisions of the "Treaty of Friendship, Cooperation and Mutual Assistance between the Russian Federation and the Donetsk People's Republic and between the Russian Federation and the Luhansk People's Republic" and providing political and economic support for Russia's annexation of Ukrainian territories.
