= Andrey Popov (politician) =

Kazakh-born Russian politician (1963–2023)

- Андрей Попов
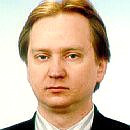

Presidential Envoy to the Central Federal District
- Acting; 31 August 2011 – 6 September 2011
- President: Dmitry Medvedev
- Preceded by: Georgy Poltavchenko
- Succeeded by: Oleg Govorun

Member of the State Duma
- In office 1993–1995

Personal details
- Born: Andrey Anatolyevich Popov; 28 June 1963 Rudny, Kazakh SSR, Soviet Union
- Died: 19 January 2023 (aged 59)
- Party: Agrarian Party of Russia

Andrey Anatolyevich Popov (Russian: Андрей Анатольевич Попов; 28 June 1963 – 19 January 2023) was a Kazakh-born Russian politician who served as the acting Presidential Envoy to the Central Federal District in 2011. He was a member of parliament of the State Duma of the first convocation from 1993 to 1995. He had the federal state civilian service rank of 1st class Active State Councillor of the Russian Federation.

== Biography ==
Andrey Popov was born in Rudny, Kazakhstan on 28 June 1963.

In 1980, he worked as an electrical fitter at the Sokolovsko-Sarbaisky mining and processing plant. In 1986, he graduated from the Moscow Institute of Steel and Alloys. From 1986 to 1989 he worked as an engineer at the Tulachermet Research Institute. From 1989 to 1991 he worked as an engineer-economist at the repair and mechanical plant of Sokolovsko-Sarbaisky GOK. From 1991 to 1993 he worked in a small enterprise "Composite" as a chief economist.

In 1993, Popov was elected to the State Duma of the first convocation. In the State Duma, he was a member of the committee on budget, taxes, banks and finance, was a member of the faction of the Agrarian Party of Russia.

In 1995, he worked in the Federation Council as an assistant to Yury Luzhkov. From 1999 to 2000 he worked as an assistant to the head of the Presidential Administration of the Russia. From 2000 to 2001, he worked in the Presidential Administration of Russia as the head of the Department for Internal Policy, Head of the Main Department for Internal Policy. From 2001 to 2004, he was the Head of the Main Territorial Administration, and from 2004 to 2006 - Head of the Internal Policy Department of the Presidential Administration of the Russia.

On 31 August 2011, Popov became the acting Presidential Envoy to the Central Federal District when Georgy Poltavchenko became Governor of Saint Petersburg. He was replaced by Oleg Govorun.

Popov died on 19 January 2023 of heart failure at the age of 59.
