= Maxim Reshetnikov =

Russian politician (born 1979)

- Максим Решетников
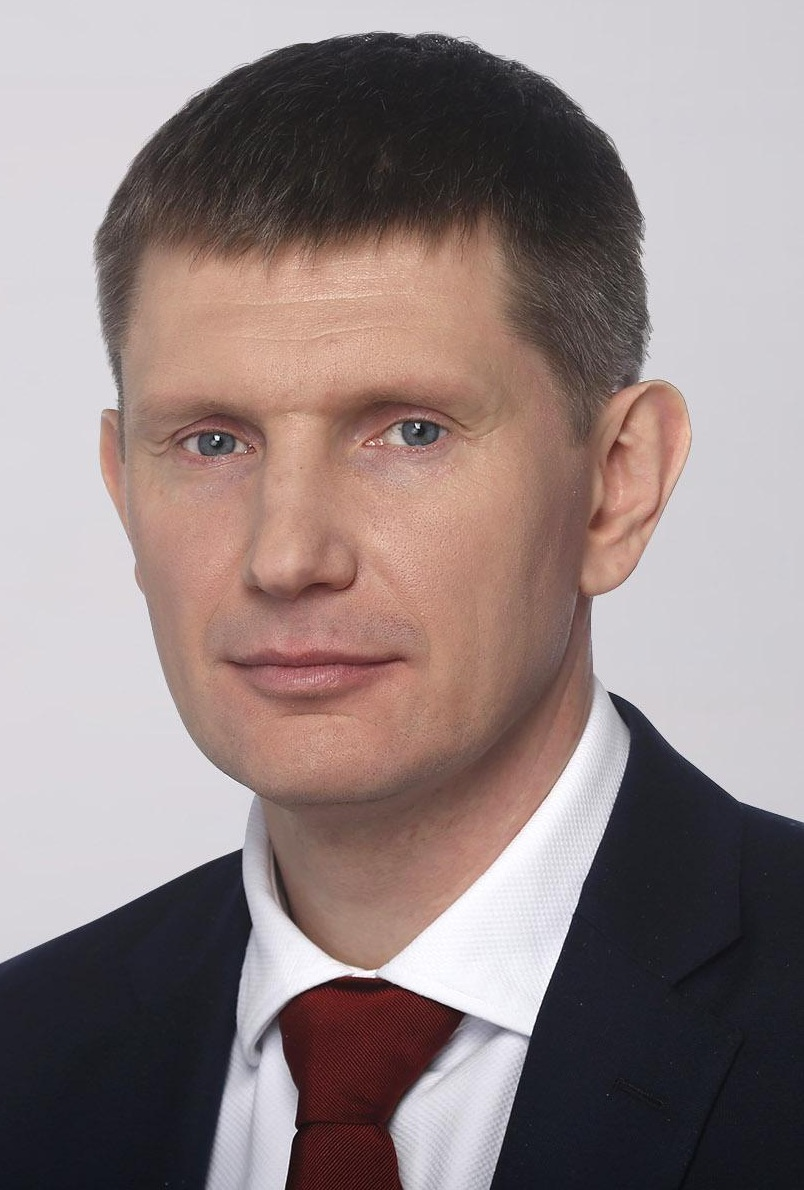
- Official portrait, 2020

Minister of Economic Development
- Incumbent
- Assumed office 21 January 2020
- Prime Minister: Mikhail Mishustin
- Preceded by: Maxim Oreshkin

3rd Governor of Perm Krai
- In office 18 September 2017 – 21 January 2020
- Preceded by: Viktor Basargin
- Succeeded by: Dmitry Makhonin

Personal details
- Born: 11 July 1979 (age 47) Perm, Russian SFSR, Soviet Union (now Perm Krai, Russia)
- Party: United Russia
- Education: Perm State University
- Profession: Economist

Maxim Gennadyevich Reshetnikov (Russian: Максим Геннадьевич Решетников; born 11 July 1979) is a Russian politician serving as the Minister of Economic Development of the Russian Federation since 21 January 2020. Previously he served as the governor of Perm Krai from 18 September 2017 to 21 January 2020. He is also a member of the Supreme Council of United Russia.

== Early life and early career ==
He graduated from school-gymnasium No. 17. After school, he entered Perm State University at the Department of Economic Cybernetics. In 2000, he graduated from the university with a degree in economics and mathematics, and two years later, in 2002, with a degree in linguist-translator. In 2003, under the guidance of L. S. Portnoy, he defended his thesis for the degree of candidate of economic sciences "Management of the region's economy on the basis of financial flows: principles and models (based on the example of the Perm Krai)"

Prior to joining the Perm Krai administration, he worked at Sterlinggroup Forecast. Since 2000, he has been working in the Administration of the Perm Region, then - in the Perm Territory. He subsequently holds the posts of head of the budget revenue and expenses planning department, head of the regional finance and investment department, deputy head of the Main Directorate of Economics, first deputy chairman of the Regional Planning Department, first deputy head of the administration of the governor of the Perm Krai, deputy director of the Department and director of the Department.

== In Perm Krai ==
From 2006 to 2007, Reshetnikov was First Deputy Head of the Administration of the Governor of the Perm Krai. In 2007-2008 - Deputy Director of the Department of Intergovernmental Relations of the Ministry of Regional Development of the Russian Federation. From June 2008 to October 2009, he was Director of the Department for Monitoring and Evaluating the Performance of Government Agencies of the Subjects of the Russian Federation in the Ministry of Regional Development of the Russian Federation. From 14 April to 12 October 2009, he was Head of the Administration of the Governor of the Perm Krai. One of the authors of the document "Fundamentals of the strategy of socio-economic development of the Perm Krai".

Since 2009, it has been included in the first hundred personnel reserve of the President of Russia. In the same year, he occupied the post of head of the administration of the governor of Perm Krai Oleg Chirkunov.

On 12 October 2009, he was appointed Director of the Department of Public Administration, Regional Development and Local Self-Government of the Apparatus of the Government of the Russian Federation, headed by Sergey Sobyanin. He held the post until December 2010.

After the appointment of Sobyanin as mayor of Moscow, he joined the Government of Moscow.

From December 2010 to April 2012, he was First Deputy Chief of Staff of the Mayor and the Government of Moscow.

From April 2012 to February 2017, Reshetnikov was the Minister of the Government of Moscow, head of the Department of Economic Policy and City Development. He was of the creators of the investment strategy of Moscow from 2014 to 2025.

=== Governor of Perm Krai ===
On 6 February 2017, by decree of Russian President Vladimir Putin, he was temporarily appointed (until the election) as acting governor of the Perm Krai.

On 14 June 2017 became the official candidate for the gubernatorial elections from the United Russia party. On 10 September he won the election, gaining 82.06% of the vote. On 18 September 2017, he assumed the post of Governor of the Perm Krai.

In December 2017, he joined the United Russia party. On December 8, 2018, on the basis of a decision adopted by delegates of the XVIII Congress of the United Russia, he was included in the Supreme Council of the party.

== Federal Minister of Economic Development ==
On 21 January 2020, one day after the ejection of PM Dmitry Medvedev and dissolution of his cabinet, by presidential decree of the Vladimir Putin, he was appointed Minister of Economic Development of the Russian Federation in Mikhail Mishustin's Cabinet.

On April 14, 2026, after years of Russian warfare against Ukraine, he pointed out that the reserves in the Russian economy were largely depleted.

=== Sanctions ===
In February 2022, Reshetnikov was put on the European Union sanctions list for being "responsible for providing financial and material support, and benefitting from Russian decision-makers responsible for the annexation of Crimea or the destabilisation of Eastern Ukraine."

On 15 March the United Kingdom sanctioned him and on 20 April 2022 he was sanctioned by New Zealand in relation to the 2022 Russian invasion of Ukraine.

On 2 June 2022 the United States Department of the Treasury placed sanctions on him as a member of the Government of Russia pursuant to Executive Order 14024.
