= Ryabinino =

Ryabinino Рябинино
- Settlement
- Location within Perm Krai Location within Russia
- Coordinates: 60°19′03″N 56°29′20″E
- Country: Russia
- Region: Perm Krai
- District: Cherdynsky District
- Time zone: UTC+5:00

Ryabinino (Russian: Рябинино) is a rural locality (a settlement) and the administrative center of Ryabininskoye Rural Settlement, Cherdynsky District, Perm Krai, Russia. The population was 1,661 as of 2010. There are 21 streets.

== Geography ==
Ryabinino is located 11 km south of Cherdyn (the district's administrative centre) by road. Seregovo is the nearest rural locality.
