= Ministry of Regional Development (Russia) =

Russian former government ministry

Ministry of Regional Development, MinRegion
- Министерство регионального развития Российской Федерации

Agency overview
- Formed: September 13, 2004
- Dissolved: September 8, 2014
- Jurisdiction: Government of Russia
- Headquarters: Krasnaya Presnya, D. 3, Moscow
- Employees: 639
- Annual budget: ~6.5 billion U.S. dollars
- Minister responsible: Igor Slyunyayev (last)
- Child agency: Gosstroy (2008-2013)

Ministry of Regional Development of Russia (Russian: Министерство регионального развития Российской Федерации – Минрегион России) was the federal ministry in the Russian government that was responsible for regional social development. The last minister was Igor Slyunyayev, who was appointed in 2012 as part of Dmitry Medvedev's Cabinet.

On 8 September 2014 President Vladimir Putin and Prime Minister Dmitry Medvedev approved the abolishing of the ministry with the competences being spread to a number of ministries.

== Previous names ==
- Ministry for Regional Policy (Министерство региональной политики Российской Федерации) (1998—1999)
- Ministry for Nationality and Federation Affairs (Министерство РФ по делам федерации и национальностей) (1999—2000)
- Ministry for Nationality, Federation and Migratory Policy (Министерство по делам федерации, национальной и миграционной политики РФ) (2000—2001)

== Ministers ==
- Vladimir Yakovlev (September 2004 — September 2007)
- Dmitry Kozak (September 2007 — October 2008)
- Viktor Basargin (October 2008 — April 2012)
- Vladimir Tokarev (April – May 2012)
- Oleg Govorun (May – October 2012)
- Igor Slyunyaev (October 2012 – September 2014)

== See also ==
- Ministry of Construction Industry, Housing and Utilities Sector
