= Kartalinsky District =

Kartalinsky District Карталинский район (Russian)
- District
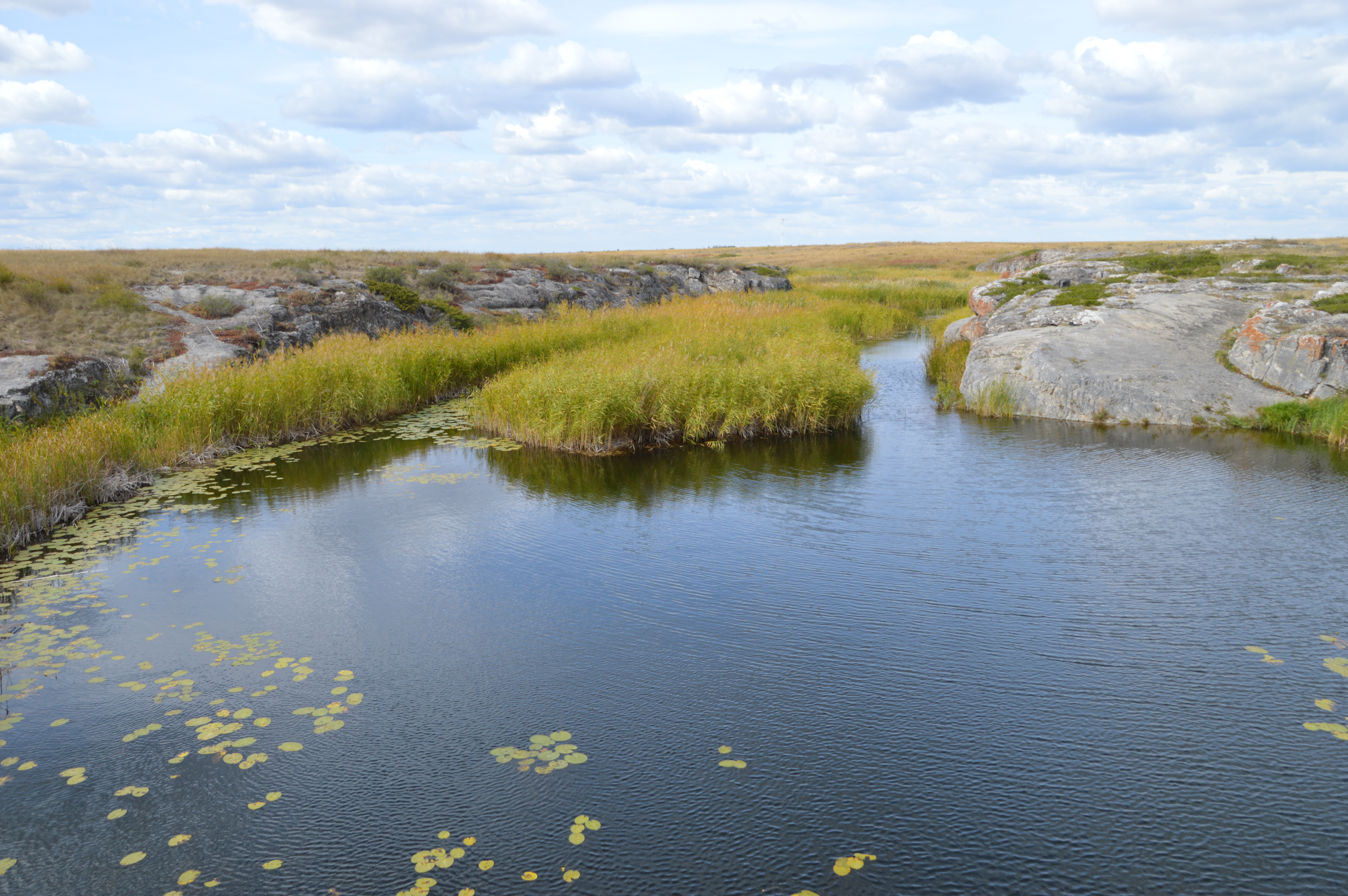
- Shiryaev Creek, Kartalinsky District

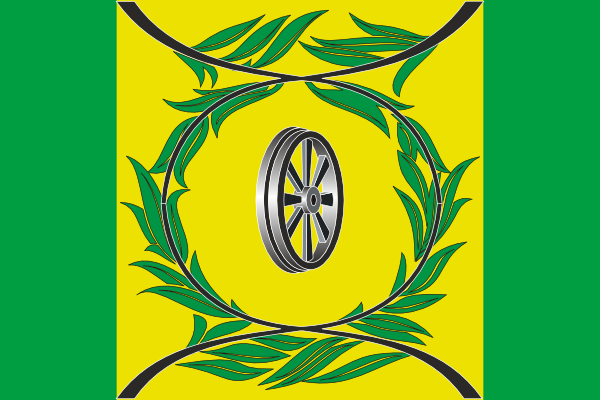
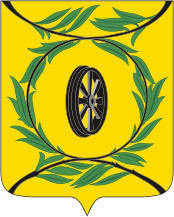
- Flag Coat of arms
- Location of Kartalinsky District in Chelyabinsk Oblast
- Coordinates: 53°03′N 60°39′E
- Country: Russia
- Federal subject: Chelyabinsk Oblast
- Established: 4 November 1926
- Administrative center: Kartaly

Area
  - Total: 4,737 km^{2} (1,829 sq mi)

Population (2010 Census)
  - Total: 20,256
  - Density: 4.276/km^{2} (11.08/sq mi)
  - Urban: 0%
  - Rural: 100%

Administrative structure
  - Administrative divisions: 1 Towns, 10 Selsoviets
  - Inhabited localities: 1 cities/towns, 47 rural localities

Municipal structure
  - Municipally incorporated as: Kartalinsky Municipal District
  - Municipal divisions: 1 urban settlements, 10 rural settlements
- Time zone: UTC+5 (MSK+2)
- OKTMO ID: 75623000
- Website: http://www.kartalyraion.ru/

Kartalinsky District (Russian: Картали́нский райо́н; Kazakh: Қарталы ауданы, Qartaly aýdany) is an administrative and municipal district (raion), one of the twenty-seven in Chelyabinsk Oblast, Russia. It is located in the southeast of the oblast. The area of the district is 4,737 square kilometers (1,829 sq mi). Its administrative center is the town of Kartaly. Population (excluding the administrative center): 20,256 (2010 census); 21,961 (2002 Census); 22,170 (1989 Soviet census).

== Administrative and municipal status ==
Within the framework of administrative divisions, it has a status of a town with territorial district—a unit equal in status to administrative districts—the full name of which is The Town of Kartaly and Kartalinsky District (город Карталы и Карталинский район). As a municipal division, it is incorporated as Kartalinsky Municipal District.
