= Dmitry Makhonin =

Russian statesman and political figure

- Дмитрий Махонин
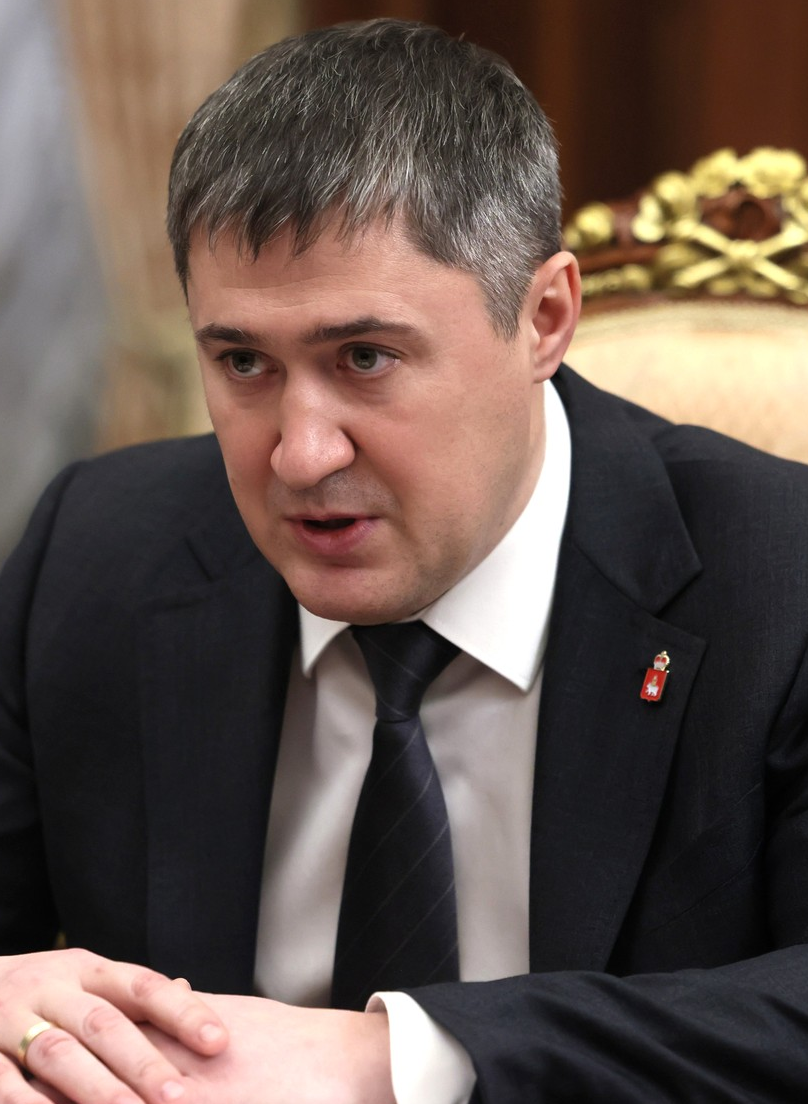
- Makhonin in 2025

4th Governor of Perm Krai
- Incumbent
- Assumed office 7 October 2020
- Preceded by: Maxim Reshetnikov

Governor of Perm Krai (acting)
- In office 6 February 2020 – 7 October 2020

Personal details
- Born: 18 October 1982 (age 43) Ryabinino, Russian SFSR, Soviet Union
- Party: United Russia (Since 2023)
- Other political affiliations: Independent; Yabloko
- Children: 3
- Awards: Medal of the Order "For Merit to the Fatherland" Second Class

Dmitry Nikolayevich Makhonin (Russian: Дмитрий Николаевич Махонин; born 18 October 1982) is a Russian statesman and politician who is currently serving as the governor of Perm Krai since 7 October 2020.

He was in charge of the Federal Antimonopoly Service for Perm Krai from 2009 to 2013, and the fuel and energy complex and the chemical industry regulation department of the Federal Antimonopoly Service from 2013 until 2020. He was appointed to the rank of the State Advisor of the Russian Federation, 1st class in 2016. He was a member of the Yabloko political party.

== Biography ==
Dmitry Makhonin was born in a small rural village of Ryabinino in Perm Oblast on 18 October 1982.

In 2004, he graduated from the Law Faculty of Perm State University with a degree in law.

He began his career in 2004 as a specialist of the 1st category of the department of administrative and economic support and work with correspondence of the Office of the Federal Antimonopoly Service (FAS) for Perm Krai.

From April 2008, he was the Deputy Head of the FAS Russia Directorate for Perm Krai. And on 8 June 2009, he was promoted as the Head of the FAS Russia Directorate for the Perm Krai.

On 28 January 2013, Makhonin was appointed head of the FAS Russia's fuel and energy complex control department.

In 2016, Makhonin unsuccessfully ran for the VII convocation of the State Duma for Perm Krai as a representative of the Yabloko party.

On 6 February 2020, Makhonin was appointed as acting Governor of Perm Krai. On 8 February, he assumed the duties of Chairman of the Government of Perm Krai.

== Family ==
Makhonin is married, with three children.
