= Maria Drobot =

Russian politician (born 1982)

Maria Drobot MP
- Мария Дробот
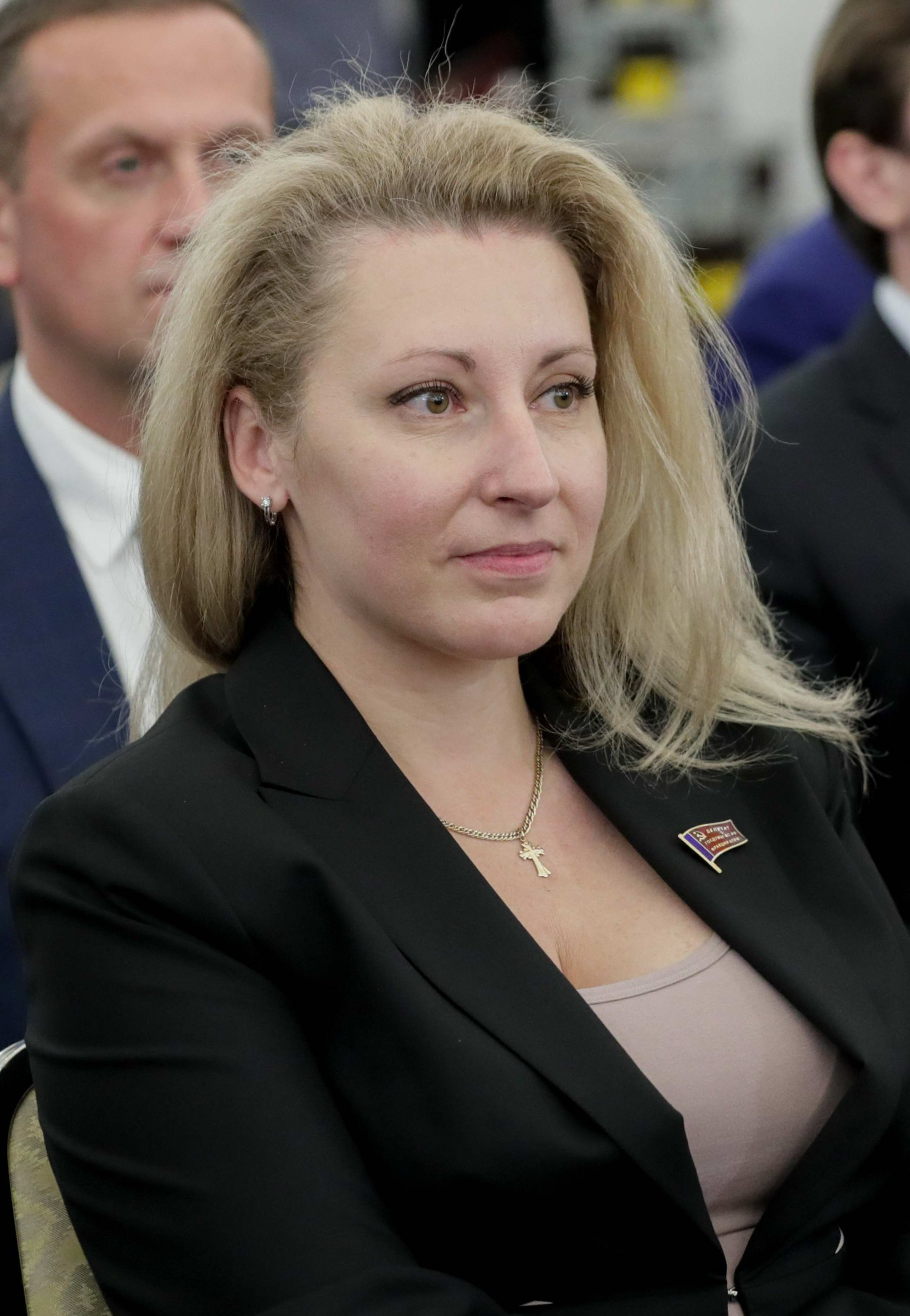

Member of the State Duma (Party List Seat)
- Incumbent
- Assumed office 12 October 2021

Personal details
- Born: 21 March 1982 (age 44) Rostov-on-Don, RSFSR, USSR
- Party: Communist Party of the Russian Federation
- Education: Rostov State University; Russian State University of Trade and Economics

Maria Vladimirovna Drobot (Russian: Мария Владимировна Дробот; born 21 March 1982) is a Russian political figure and a deputy of the 8th State Duma.

In 2008, Maria Drobot joined the Communist Party of the Russian Federation. She worked as an advisor to the deputy of the 5th and 6th State Dumas. From 2008 to 2018, she was the first secretary of the Rostov Regional Committee of the Lenin Komsomol. From 2015 to 2017, Drobot headed the department of the Central Committee of the Communist Party of the Russian Federation for organizational, party and personnel work. Since September 2021, she has served as deputy of the 8th State Duma.

== Sanctions ==
Since February 23, 2022, he has been under sanctions imposed by all European Union member states. Since March 11, 2022, he has been under sanctions by the United Kingdom. Since March 24, 2022, he has been under sanctions by the United States for “complicity in Putin’s war” and for “supporting the Kremlin’s efforts in the invasion of Ukraine.” Since February 24, 2022, he has been under sanctions by Canada. Since February 25, 2022, he has been under sanctions by Switzerland. Since February 26, 2022, he has been under sanctions by Australia. Since April 12, 2022, he has been under sanctions by Japan. By decree of Ukrainian president Volodymyr Zelenskyy dated September 7, 2022, he has been under sanctions by Ukraine. Since May 3, 2022, he has been under sanctions by New Zealand.

She was sanctioned by the UK government in 2022 in relation to the Russo-Ukrainian War.
