= Kartaly =

Kartaly Карталы
- Town
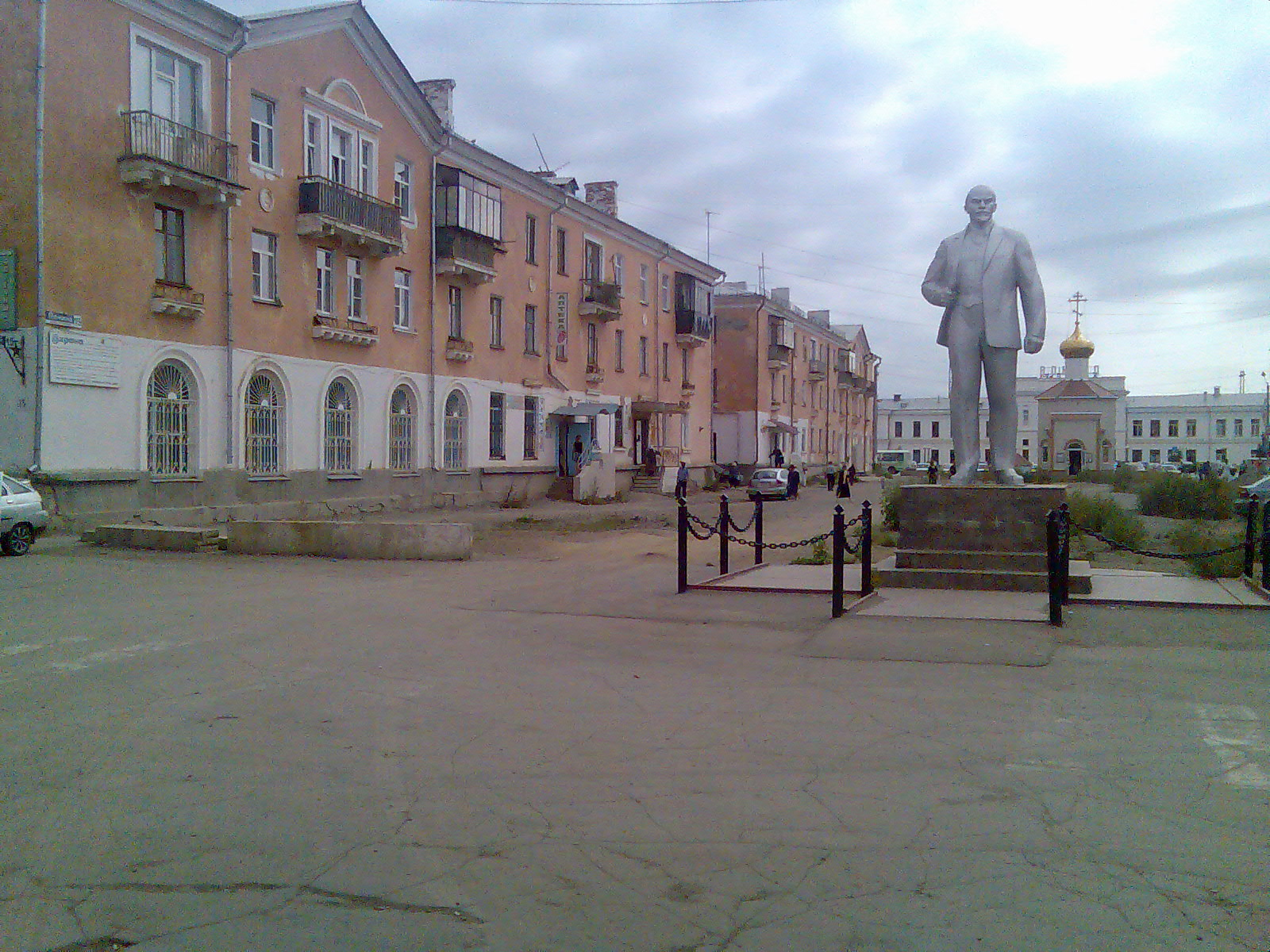
- Monument in Kartaly

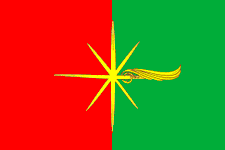
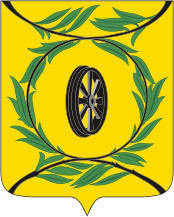
- Flag Coat of arms
- Interactive map of Kartaly
- Location of Kartaly Kartaly (Chelyabinsk Oblast)
- Coordinates: 53°03′N 60°39′E
- Country: Russia
- Federal subject: Chelyabinsk Oblast
- Administrative district: Kartalinsky District
- TownSelsoviet: Kartaly
- Founded: 1810
- Town status since: April 17, 1944
- Elevation: 300 m (980 ft)

Population (2010 Census)
  - Total: 29,131
  - Estimate (2023): 26,679 (−8.4%)

Administrative status
  - Capital of: Kartalinsky District, Town of Kartaly

Municipal status
  - Municipal district: Kartalinsky Municipal District
  - Urban settlement: Kartalinskoye Urban Settlement
  - Capital of: Kartalinsky Municipal District, Kartalinskoye Urban Settlement
- Time zone: UTC+5 (MSK+2)
- Postal codes: 457350–457354, 457357–457359
- OKTMO ID: 75623101001
- Website: www.asha-gp.ru

Kartaly (Russian: Карталы́) is a town and the administrative center of Kartalinsky District in Chelyabinsk Oblast, Russia, located in the valley of the Kartaly-Ayat River (left tributary of the Tobol), 260 kilometers (160 mi) southwest of Chelyabinsk, the administrative center of the oblast. Population: 29,131 (2010 census); 29,908 (2002 census); 37,132 (1989 Soviet census).

== History ==
It was founded in 1810. Town status was granted to it on April 17, 1944.

== Administrative and municipal status ==
Within the framework of administrative divisions, Kartaly serves as the administrative center of Kartalinsky District. As an administrative division, it is incorporated within Kartalinsky District as the Town of Kartaly. As a municipal division, the Town of Kartaly is incorporated within Kartalinsky Municipal District as Kartalinskoye Urban Settlement.
