= Legislative Assembly of Perm Krai =

Regional parliament of Perm Krai, Russia

Legislative Assembly of Perm Krai Законодательное собрание Пермского края
- 4th legislature

Type
- Type: Unicameral

Leadership
- Chairman: Valery Sukhikh, United Russia since 23 December 2011

Structure
- Seats: 60
- Political groups: United Russia (40) CPRF (11); LDPR (3); SRZP (3); New People (2) Independent (1)

Elections
- Voting system: Mixed
- Last election: 19 September 2021
- Next election: 2026

Meeting place
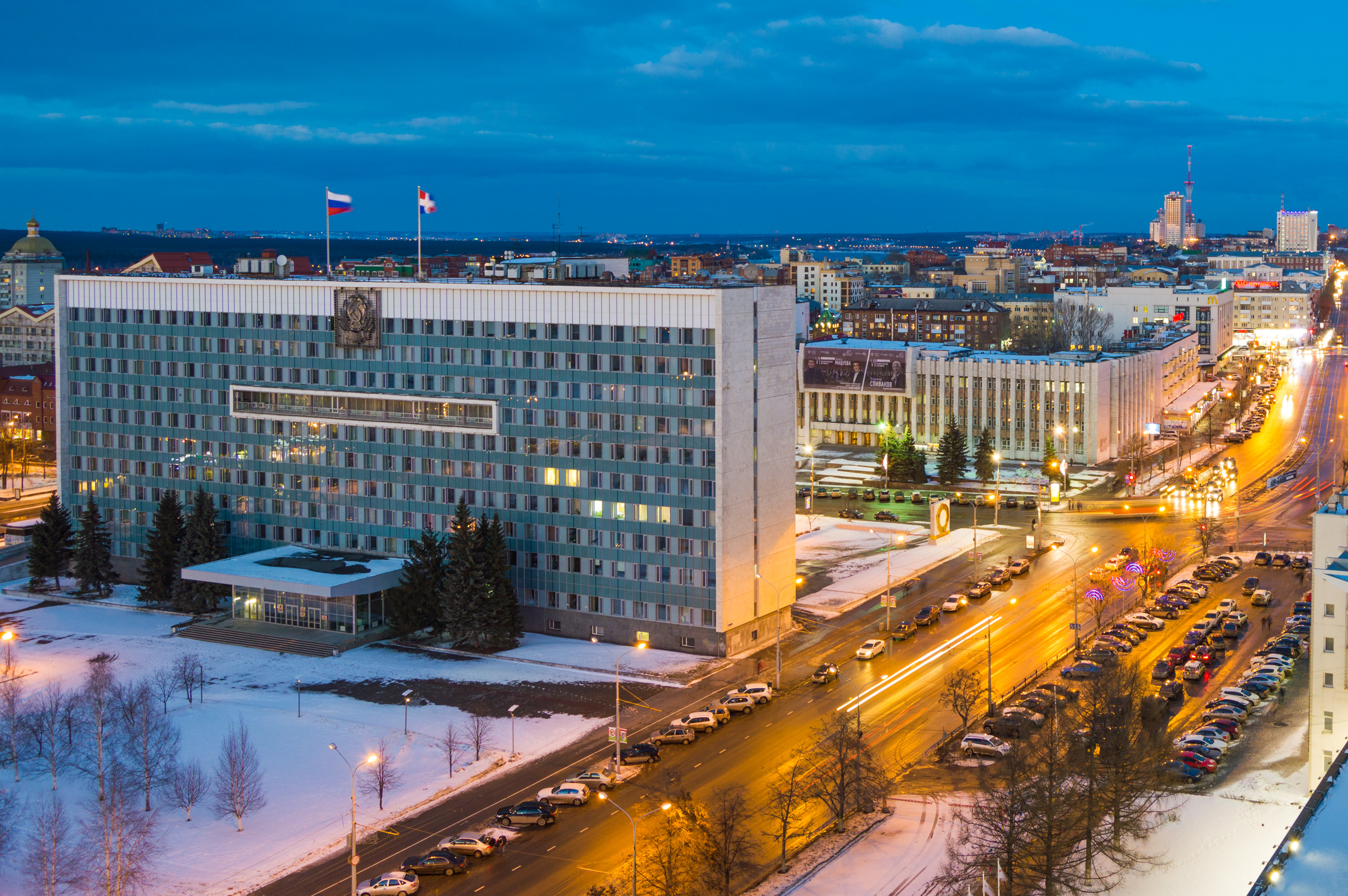
- 51 Lenin Street, Perm

Website
- www.zsperm.ru

The Legislative Assembly of Perm Krai (Russian: Законодательное собрание Пермского края) is the regional parliament of Perm Krai, a federal subject of Russia. A total of 60 deputies are elected for five-year terms.

== Elections ==
=== 2021 ===
Party	%	Seats
United Russia	33.05	40
Communist Party of the Russian Federation	22.74	11
A Just Russia	11.31	3
Liberal Democratic Party of Russia	9.64	3
New People	8.40	2
Self-nominated	—	1
Russian Party of Pensioners for Social Justice	4.74	0
Registered voters/turnout	38.30	

== List of chairmen ==
- Nikolay Devyatkin — 2006 to 2011
- Valery Sukhikh — 2011 to present
