= Perm Krai =

First-level administrative division of Russia

Perm Krai Пермский край (Russian)
- Krai

Other transcription(s)
  - Komi-Permyak: Перем ладор
- Flag Coat of arms

- Coordinates: 59°14′N 56°08′E
- Country: Russia
- Federal district: Volga
- Economic region: Ural
- Established: 1 December 2005
- Administrative center: Perm

Government
  - Body: Legislative Assembly
  - Governor: Dmitry Makhonin

Area
  - Total: 160,236 km^{2} (61,867 sq mi)
  - Rank: 24th

Population (2021 census)
  - Total: 2,532,405
  - Estimate (2018): 2,623,122
  - Rank: 17th
  - Density: 15.8042/km^{2} (40.9327/sq mi)
  - Urban: 75.6%
  - Rural: 24.4%

GDP (nominal, 2024)
  - Total: ₽2.6 trillion (US$30.56 billion)
  - Per capita: ₽1.05 million (US$12,273.99)
- Time zone: UTC+5 (MSK+2)
- ISO 3166 code: RU-PER
- License plates: 59, 81, 159
- OKTMO ID: 57000000
- Official languages: Russian
- Website: https://www.permkrai.ru/

Perm Krai (Note: Russian: Пе́рмский край, romanized: Permskiy kray, IPA: [ˈpʲɛrmskʲɪj ˈkraj]; Komi-Permyak: Перем ладор, romanized: Perem lador) is a federal subject of Russia (a krai), located in Eastern Europe. Its administrative center is Perm. The population of the krai was 2,532,405 (2021 Census).

The krai was formed on 1 December 2005 as a result of the 2004 referendum on the merger of Perm Oblast and Komi-Permyak Autonomous Okrug. Komi-Permyak Okrug retained its autonomous status within Perm Krai during the transitional period of 2006–2008. It also retained a budget separate from that of the krai, keeping all federal transfers. Starting in 2009, Komi-Permyak Okrug's budget became subject to the budgeting law of Perm Krai. The transitional period was implemented in part because Komi-Permyak Okrug relied heavily on federal subsidies, and an abrupt cut would have been detrimental to its economy.

The final period of the Paleozoic era, the Permian, is named after the Perm region.

== Geography ==
Perm Krai is located to the east of the East European Plain and the western slope of the Middle Ural Mountains. 99.8% of its area is in Europe, 0.2% in Asia. The maximum length from north to south is 645 km, from west to east — almost 420 km. The borders of the region are winding and have a length of more than 2.2 thousand km.

- length from north to south – 645 kilometres (401 mi)
- length from west to east – 417.5 kilometres (259.4 mi)

The krai borders the Komi Republic in the north, Kirov Oblast in the northwest, the Udmurt Republic in the southwest, the Republic of Bashkortostan in the south, and Sverdlovsk Oblast in the east.

The krai borders stretch for over 2,200 kilometres (1,400 mi). The highest point is Mount Tulymsky Kamen at 1,496 metres (4,908 ft).

=== Rivers ===
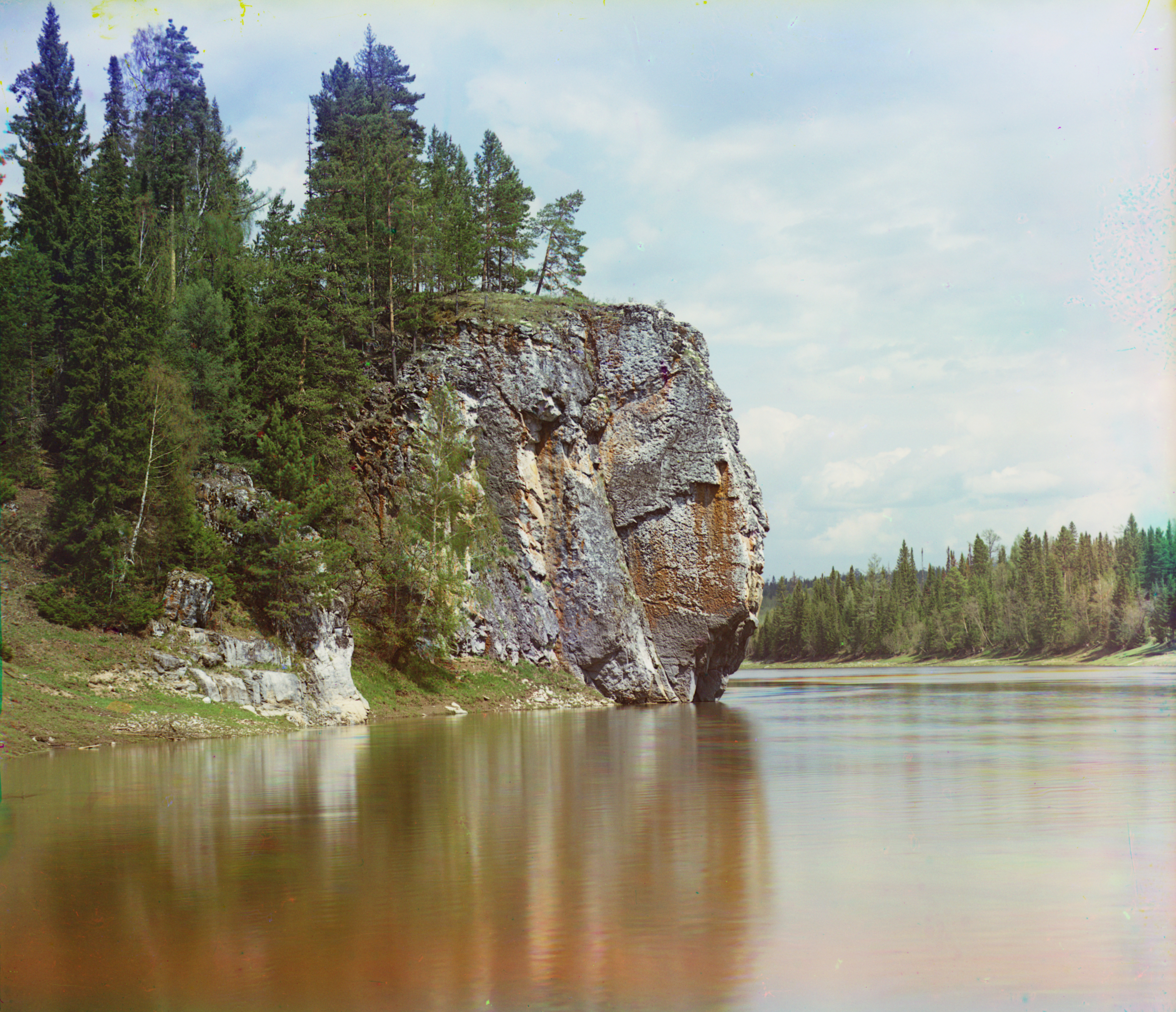
Chusovaya River

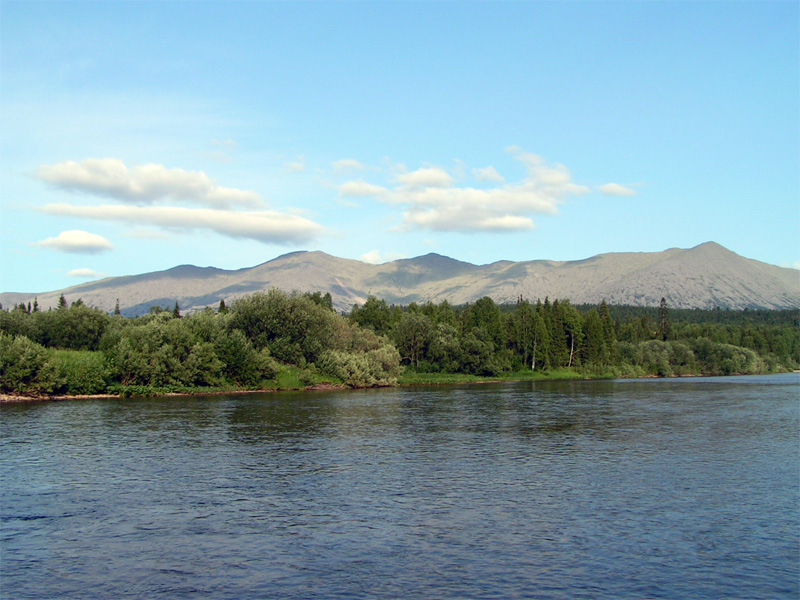
Vishera River

Rivers of Perm Krai belong to the Kama River Basin, the largest tributary of Volga River. There are more than 29,000 rivers in Perm Krai. The total length of all rivers is more than 90,000 kilometres (56,000 mi).

Only two rivers in Perm Krai have lengths exceeding 500 kilometres (310 mi). They are the Kama River at 1,805 kilometres (1,122 mi) and the Chusovaya River, 592 kilometres (368 mi).

There are about 40 rivers with lengths from 100 to 500 kilometres (62 to 311 mi). The longest of them are:

- Sylva River — 493 km (306 mi)
- Kolva River — 460 km (285 mi)
- Vishera River — 415 km (258 mi)
- Yayva River — 403 km (250 mi)
- Kosva River — 283 km (176 mi)
- Kosa River — 267 km (165 mi)
- Veslyana River — 266 km (165 mi)
- Inva River — 257 km (159 mi)
- Obva River — 247 km (153 mi)

There are also many small rivers, but some of them have historical significance, for example Yegoshikha River, at the mouth of which the city of Perm was founded.

=== Climate ===
Perm Krai has a continental climate. Winters are long and snowy, with average temperatures in January varying from −18 °C (0 °F) in the northeast part of krai to −15 °C (5 °F) in southwest part. The record lowest recorded temperature was −53 °C (−63 °F) (in the north).

=== Minerals ===
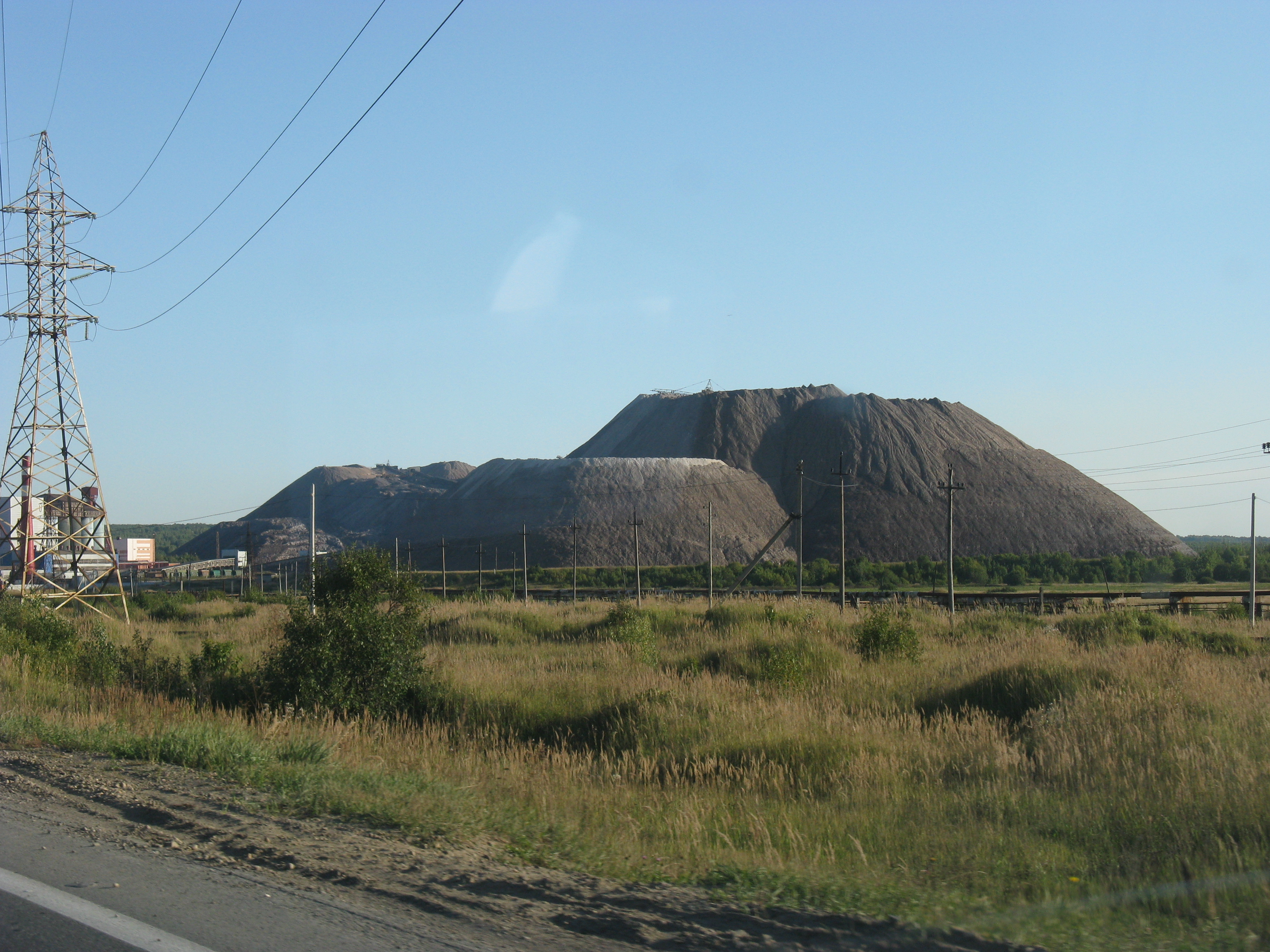
Salt dump in Solikamsk

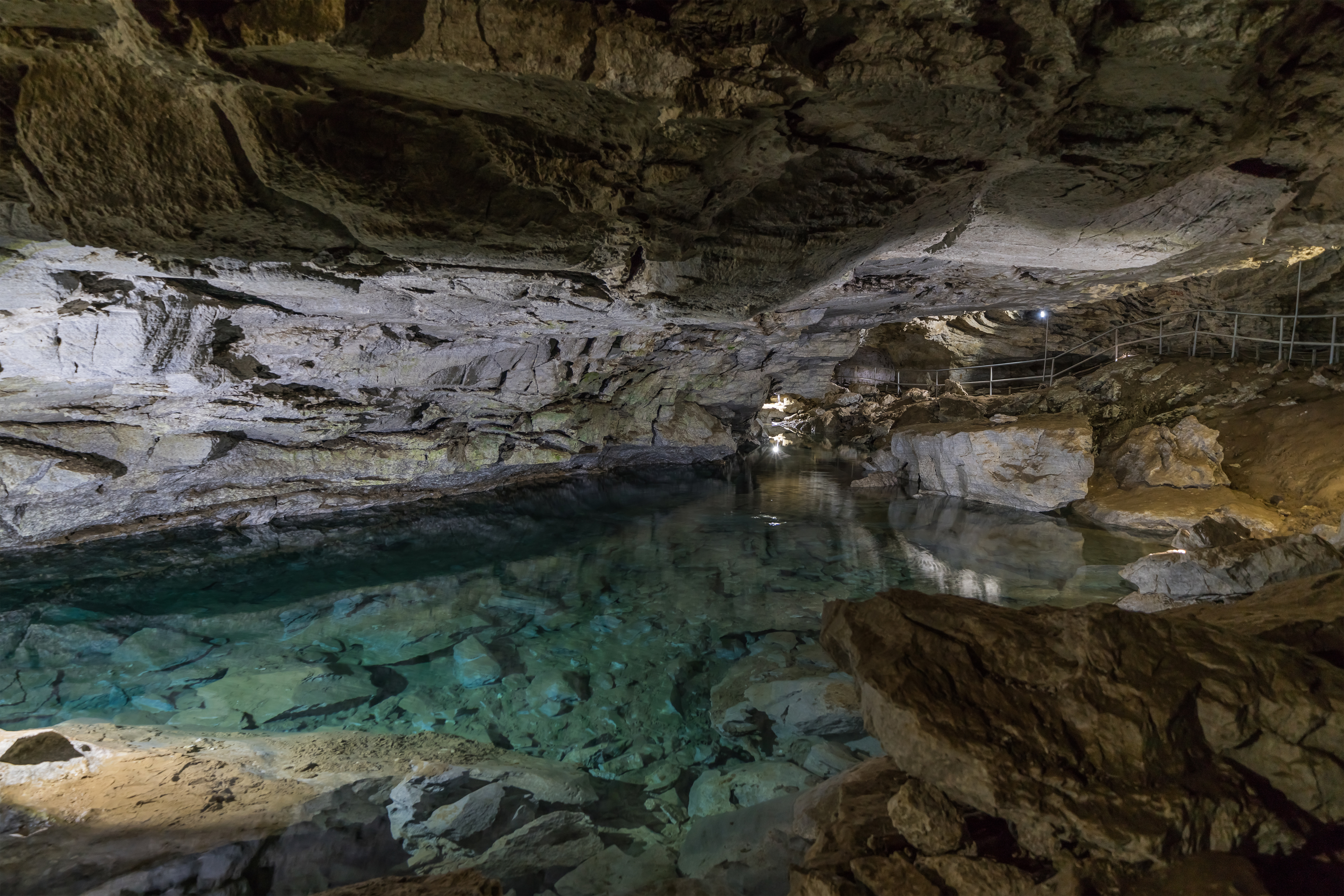
Kungur Ice Cave

Perm Krai has an abundance of minerals. Oil, natural gas, gold, diamonds, chromites, peat, limestone and building materials are among the many natural resources extracted.

Oil in its area was first discovered in 1929 near settlement Verhnechusovskie Gorodki. Currently there are more than 180 oil and gas fields known. Among them the developed ones are: 89 oil, 2 gas and 18 both oil and gas fields. Most of them are small and based in the central and southern districts of the krai. The northern fields are less developed because the oil lies deep under salt layers.

Coal has been mined in Perm Krai for more than 200 years. For a long time it played an important role in the fuel and energy balance in the region. Maximum mining was in 1960 when it reached 12 million tonnes. Mining then decreased and there are no exploration of new fields.

The Verkhnekamskoye deposit of potassium salts is one of the largest in the world. It is approx. 1,800 km^{2} (690 sq mi), and the thickness of the salt layers reaches 514 m.

In 1841 the geological Permian Period was named after strata of rocks from that time were found in this area.

=== Flora and fauna ===
Forests cover about 71% of Perm Krai's area. Coniferous forests predominate, with deciduous forests more common in the south. There are 62 species of mammals, more than 270 species of birds, 39 species of fishes, 6 species of reptile and 9 species of amphibians.

Three nature reserves are located in Perm Krai: Basegi, Vishera, Preduralie.

== Politics ==
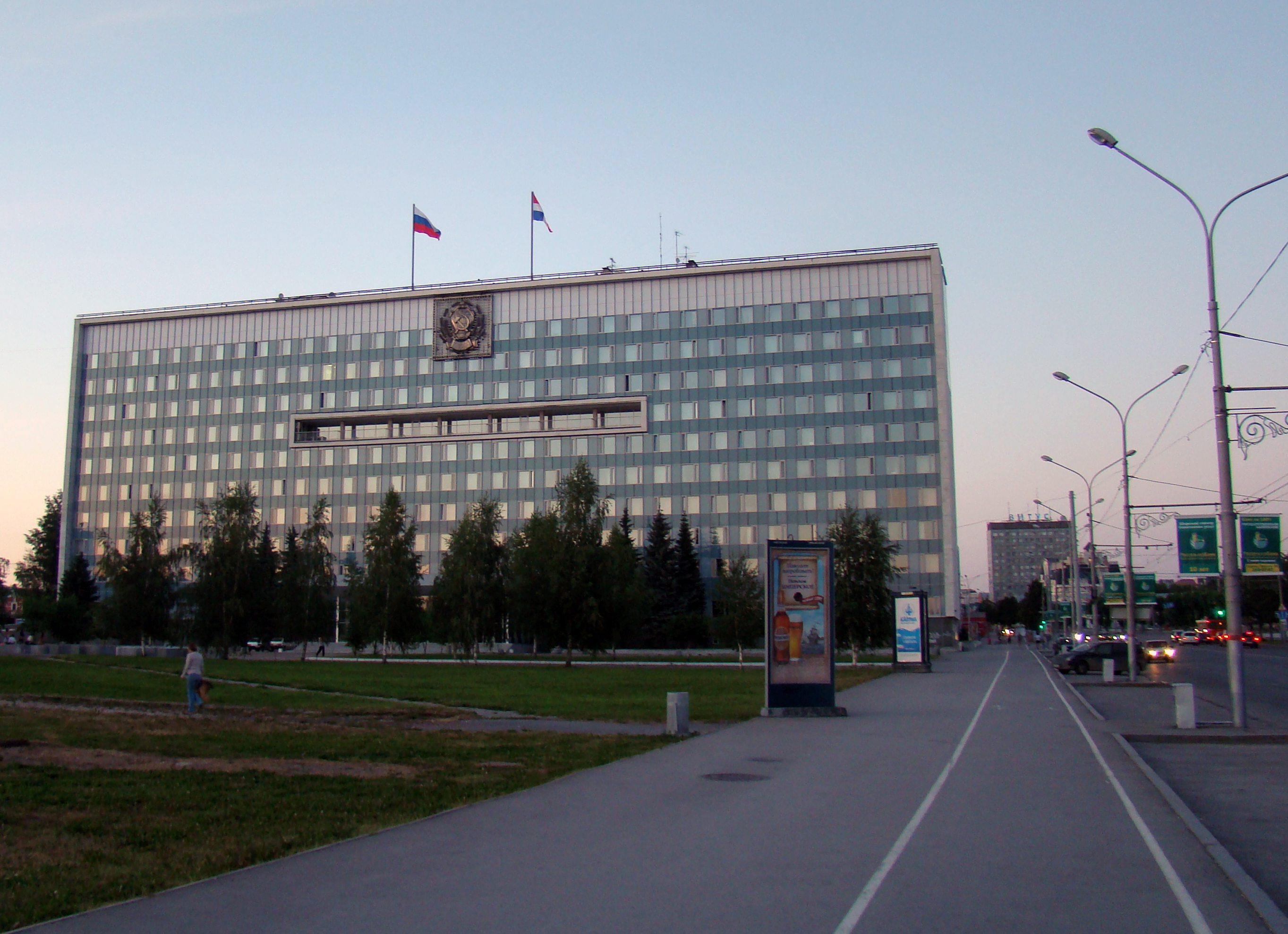
Perm Krai Legislative Assembly

=== Legislature ===
Legislative power in the region is exercised by the Legislative Assembly of Perm Krai, which consists of 60 deputies elected by the inhabitants of the Krai for a term of five years. 30 deputies are elected from party lists (proportional system), and the remaining 30 from single-member districts (majority system). To receive seats on party lists, parties must overcome the 5% threshold (for the first convocation - 7%). The first elections of deputies to the Legislative Assembly of the Perm Krai were held on 3 December 2006.

Party list places:

- 1st Convocation (2006): United Russia (12), Union of Right Forces (6), Liberal Democratic Party of Russia (5), Russian Party of Pensioners (4), Communist Party of the Russian Federation (3);
- 2nd Convocation (2011): United Russia (14), CPRF (6), LDPR (5), A Just Russia (5);
- 3rd Convocation (2016): United Russia (16), CPRF (6), LDPR (5), A Just Russia (3);
- 4th Convocation (2021): United Russia (13), CPRF (9), A Just Russia (3), LDPR (3), New People (2).

In single-mandate constituencies, the overwhelming majority always remained with the nominees of United Russia, with victory in 20, 25, 24 and 27 out of 30 constituencies, respectively.

=== Law enforcement ===
ГУ МВД России по Пермскому краю MVD's Directorate of Perm Krai
- Common name: Полиция Перми
- Motto: служа закону, Служим народу by serving the law, we serve the people

Jurisdictional structure
- Operations jurisdiction: RUS
- Governing body: MVD
- General nature: Local civilian police

Operational structure
- Headquarters: Komsomolskiy Pr. 74, Perm
- Elected officer responsible: Yuri Velyaev, Chief of Police
- Parent agency: MVD
- Child agency: Politsiya

Notables
- Award: 1918

Website
- Official Website

The Directorate of the Ministry for Internal Affairs in Perm Krai (ГУ МВД России по Пермскому краю) or the Police of Perm (Полиция Перми) is the main law enforcement agency of the government of Perm Krai, Russia. It is answerable to the regional MVD and the governor of Perm Krai. The chief of police is Yuri Valyaev.

== Administrative divisions ==
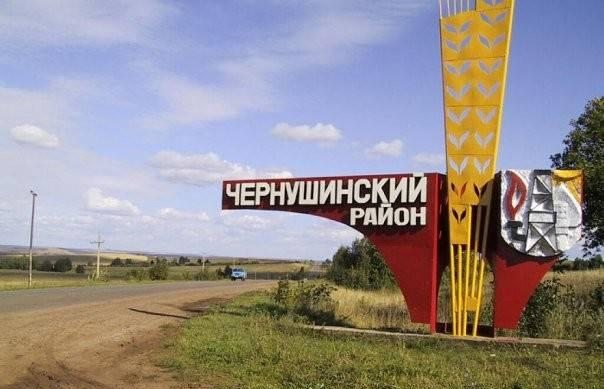
Welcome sign at the border of Chernushinsky District

Administratively, the krai is divided into thirty-three districts, fourteen cities of krai significance, and one closed administrative-territorial formation. Six administrative districts are grouped into Komi-Permyak Okrug, which is an administrative unit with special status formed within Perm Krai as a result of the 2005 merger of Perm Oblast and Komi-Permyak Autonomous Okrug, both of which used to be the federal subjects.

Municipally, the territories of all administrative districts and those of nine cities of krai significance are incorporated as municipal districts. The remaining five cities are incorporated as urban okrugs.

== Economy ==
Nonferrous metallurgy is based on ore processing Verkhnekamskoye potash deposit containing magnesium and rare metals. The factories are located in Berezniki (Titanium Magnesium Plant Corporation VSMPO) and Solikamsk (JSC Solikamsk magnesium plant).

In engineering plays an important role military production. The largest center of engineering is Perm; manufactured aircraft and rocket engines, oil field and mining equipment, Petrol motive-powered saws, communication equipment, vessels, cable and other products. The largest enterprises are Motovilikha Plants and Perm Motors. Timber Complex edge based on the use of the richest forest resources of Prikamye. Logging facilities are located mainly in the north of the region.

== Demographics ==
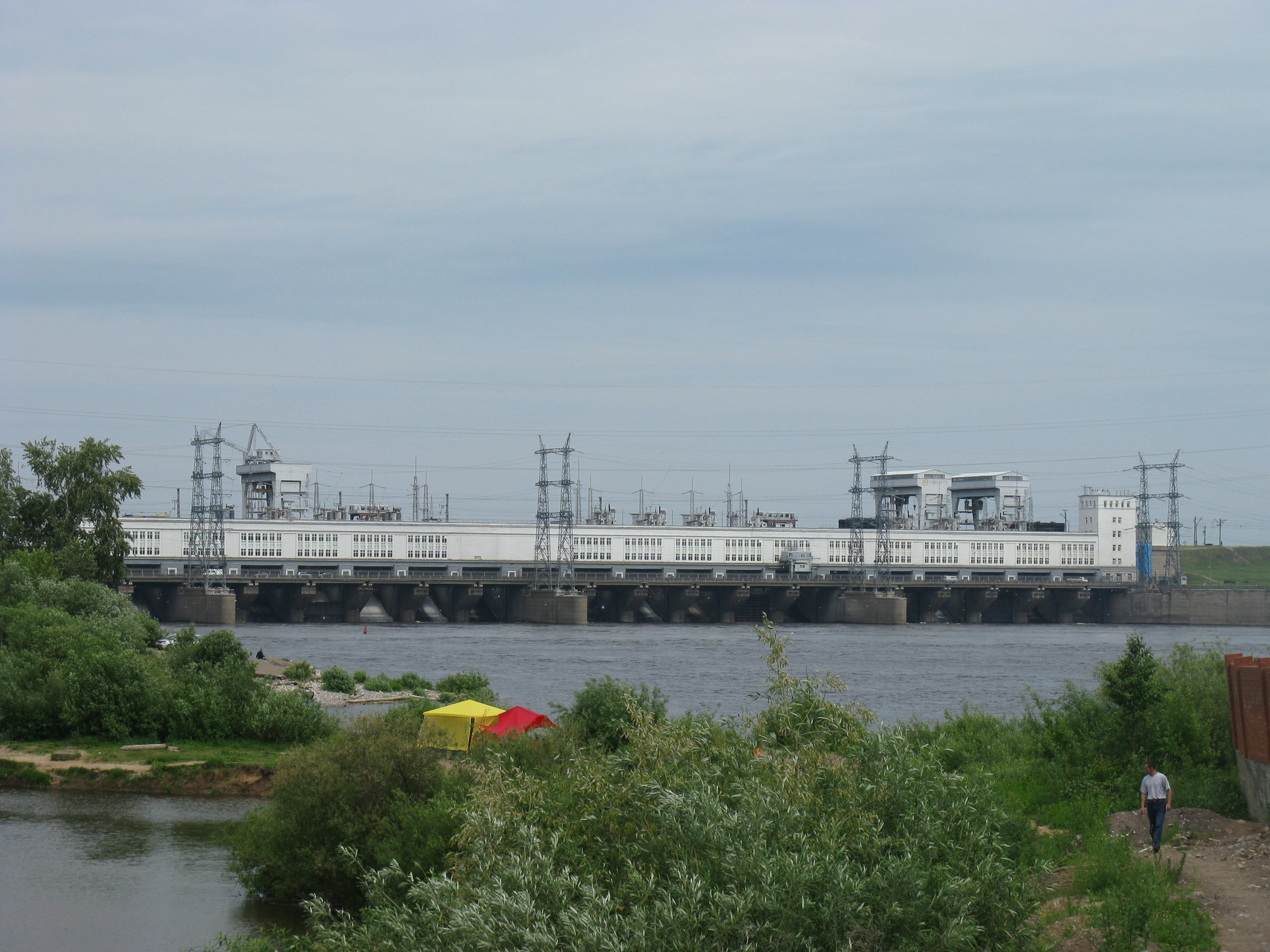
Kamskaya Hydroelectric Power Plant, Perm

According to the 2021 Census, the population of Perm Krai is 2,532,405; down from 2,635,276 in the 2010 Census; and further down from 3,099,994 recorded in the 1989 Census.

=== Ethnic groups ===
Ethnicities in Perm Krai in 2021
Ethnicity	Population	Percentage
Russians	2,030,442	89.4%
Tatars	92,472	4.1%
Komi-Permyaks	50,163	2.2%
Bashkirs	16,105	0.7%
Udmurts	11,808	0.5%
Other Ethnicities	69,877	3.1%
Ethnicity not stated	261,538	–

=== Settlements ===
Largest cities or towns in Perm Krai 2021 Russian Census
Rank		Administrative Division	Pop.
1	Perm	Permsky District	1,034,002
2	Berezniki	City of krai significance of Berezniki	138,069
3	Solikamsk	Solikamsky District	89,473
4	Chaykovsky	Town of krai significance of Chaykovsky	75,837
5	Kungur	Kungursky District	62,673
6	Lysva	Town of krai significance of Lysva	53,855
7	Krasnokamsk	Town of krai significance of Krasnokamsk	48,778
8	Chusovoy	Town of krai significance of Chusovoy	45,471
9	Chernushka	Chernushinsky District	32,991
10	Dobryanka	Town of krai significance of Dobryanka	28,782

Historical population
Year	Pop.	±%
1897	1,334,110	—
1939	2,087,518	+56.5%
1959	2,992,876	+43.4%
1970	3,023,443	+1.0%
1979	3,011,540	−0.4%
1989	3,099,994	+2.9%
2002	2,819,421	−9.1%
2010	2,635,276	−6.5%
2021	2,532,405	−3.9%
Source: Census data

Vital statistics for 2024:

- Births: 21,580 (8.7 per 1,000)
- Deaths: 34,723 (14.0 per 1,000)

Total fertility rate (2024):
1.51 children per woman

Life expectancy (2021):
Total — 68.52 years (male — 63.48, female — 73.49)

Death rates in some of the remote and rural areas in Perm Krai are very high, never seen before during times other than major wars or natural calamities. Just five districts out of a total of 47 have a surplus of births over death in Perm Krai. The birth rate in Perm Krai is much higher compared to other European regions. For example, the birth rate for Germany was 8.3 per 1000 in 2007. Perm as a whole is having 50% higher birth rate, and even the district with the lowest birth rate is having 20% higher BR compared to Germany. In 2008, the birth rate in Perm Krai was 8% higher than that of 2007. Close to 35.5 thousand births were recorded with the heaviest increases in City of Perm (+11%) and Komi-Permyak Autonomous Okrug (+18%). Among the districts, Kudymkar City recorded a 46% rise in birth rates for 2008 compared to 2007, while Usolsky recorded a 31% rise and Kyshertsky recorded a 29% rise. In 13 of the districts, there were more births than deaths, among them Ordynsky, Karagaysky, Kudimkar, Chernushynsky, Chaykovsky & Permsky.

=== Demographics for 2007 ===
District	Population	Births	Deaths	BR	DR	NGR
Perm Krai	2,718,227	32,747	42,680	12.05	15.70	-0.37%
Bolshesosnovsky	14,292	219	268	15.32	18.75	-0.34%
Vereshchagynsky	43,410	710	744	16.36	17.14	-0.08%
Gornozavodsky	27,885	396	582	14.20	20.87	-0.65%
Yelovsky	12,299	176	229	14.31	18.62	-0.43%
Kochevsky	12,356	181	196	14.65	15.86	-0.12%
Ilyinsky	20,311	278	408	13.69	20.09	-0.64%
Karagaysky	23,907	360	381	15.06	15.94	-0.08%
Kishertsky	14,578	158	280	10.84	19.21	-0.83%
Krasnovishersky	26,287	335	455	12.74	17.31	-0.45%
Kuyedinsky	30,576	446	489	14.59	15.99	-0.14%
Kungursky	46,370	727	720	15.68	15.53	0.01%
Kudymkarsky	27,922	429	676	15.36	24.21	-0.88%
Nitvensky	45,552	656	858	14.40	18.84	-0.44%
Oktyabrsky	34,789	481	585	13.83	16.82	-0.30%
Ordinsky	16,185	247	241	15.26	14.89	0.04%
Osinsky	32,074	410	550	12.78	17.15	-0.44%
Okhansky	17,180	202	359	11.76	20.90	-0.91%
Ochyorsky	24,651	366	455	14.85	18.46	-0.36%
Permsky	87,342	1,275	1,383	14.60	15.83	-0.12%
Sivinsky	16,797	297	266	17.68	15.84	0.18%
Solikamsky	17,637	203	265	11.51	15.03	-0.35%
Suksunsky	20,925	294	349	14.05	16.68	-0.26%
Uynsky	12,631	180	212	14.25	16.78	-0.25%
Usolsky	13,788	176	299	12.76	21.69	-0.88%
Chastinsky	14,450	207	254	14.33	17.58	-0.33%
Cherdynsky	32,522	342	542	10.52	16.67	-0.61%
Gaynsky	16,106	214	268	13.29	16.64	-0.33%
Chernushinsky	52,231	811	638	15.53	12.21	0.33%
Perm	987,246	10,094	13,167	10.22	13.34	-0.31%
Alexandrovsky	34,554	427	662	12.36	19.16	-0.68%
Berezniki	165,950	1,822	2,484	10.98	14.97	-0.40%
Gremyachinsky	15,075	178	367	11.81	24.34	-1.25%
Gubakhinsky	40,086	448	826	11.18	20.61	-0.92%
Dobryansky	61,365	792	950	12.91	15.48	-0.26%
Kizelovsky	30,837	381	827	12.36	26.82	-1.43%
Krasnokamsky	40,393	816	1,264	20.20	31.29	-0.64%
Kungur	68,074	872	981	12.81	14.41	-0.16%
Lysvensky	82,921	1,016	1,598	12.25	19.27	-0.70%
Solikamsk	97,269	1,165	1,464	11.98	15.05	-0.30%
Chaykovsky	108,617	1,374	1,332	12.65	12.26	0.04%
Chusovskoy	73,314	879	1,531	11.99	20.88	-0.89%
Yurlinsky	11,046	200	253	18.11	22.90	-0.48%
Kosinsky	7,716	130	160	16.85	20.74	-0.38%
Yusvinsky	22,626	288	475	12.73	20.99	-0.82%
Kudymkar	30,964	385	511	12.43	16.50	-0.40%
Bardymsky	27,529	361	537	13.11	19.51	-0.64%
Beryozovsky	17,901	230	281	12.85	15.70	-0.28%

=== Religion ===
Religion in Perm Krai as of 2012 (Sreda Arena Atlas)
Russian Orthodoxy	43%
Other Orthodox	1%
Old Believers	0.5%
Other Christians	5.3%
Islam	4.1%
Rodnovery and other native faiths	1.5%
Spiritual but not religious	23.9%
Atheism and irreligion	14%
Other and undeclared	6.7%

As of a 2012 survey 43% of the population of Perm Krai adheres to the Russian Orthodox Church, 5% declares to be generically unaffiliated Christian, 4% are Muslims, 2% are Rodnovers (Slavic folk religion), 1% are Old Believers, 1% Orthodox Christian believers who don't belong to churches or are members of non-Russian Orthodox churches, 8% follows other religion or did not give an answer to the survey. In addition, 24% of the population declares to be "spiritual but not religious" and 14% to be either atheist or not religious.

== Major attractions ==
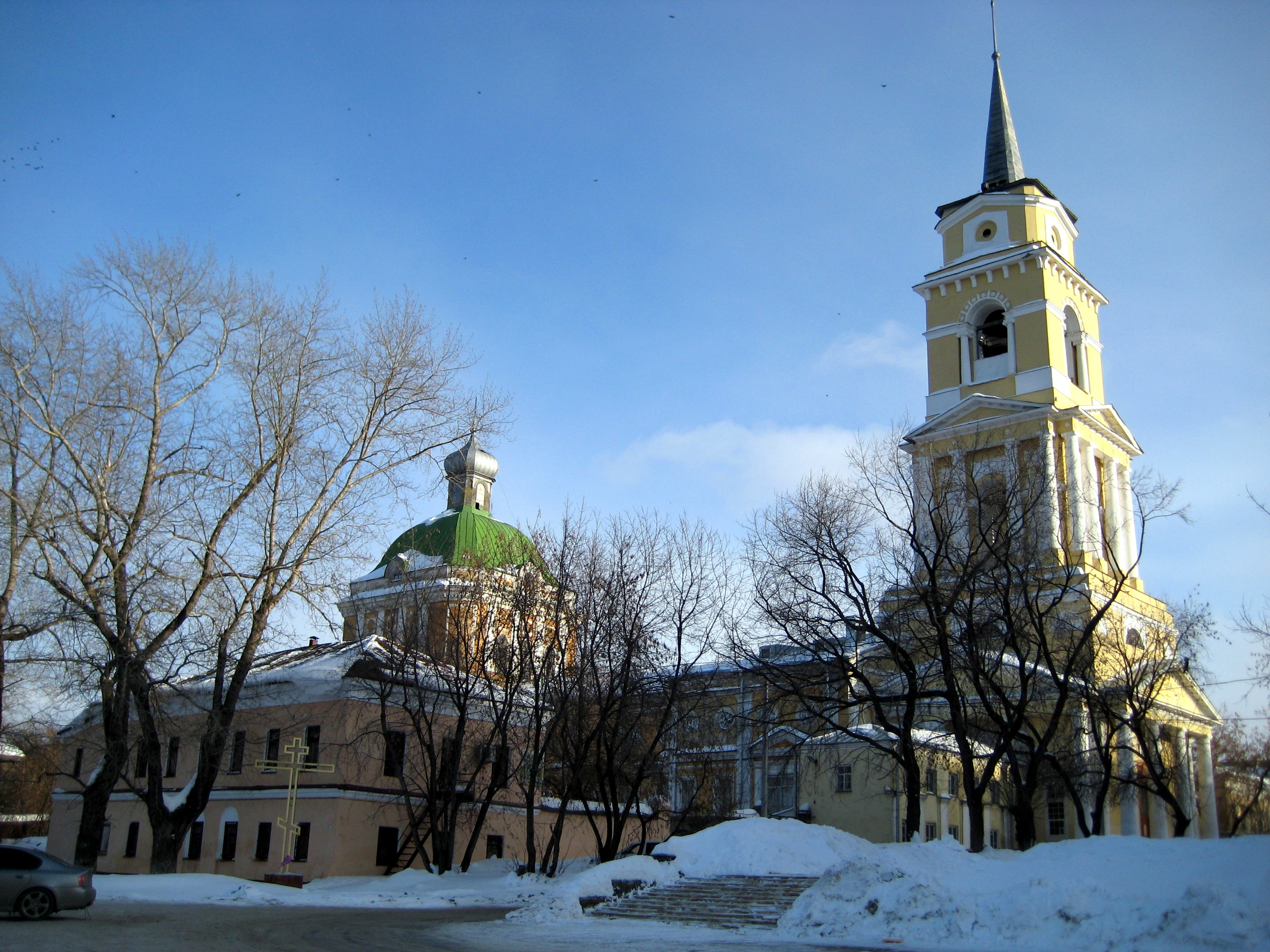
Perm State Art Gallery

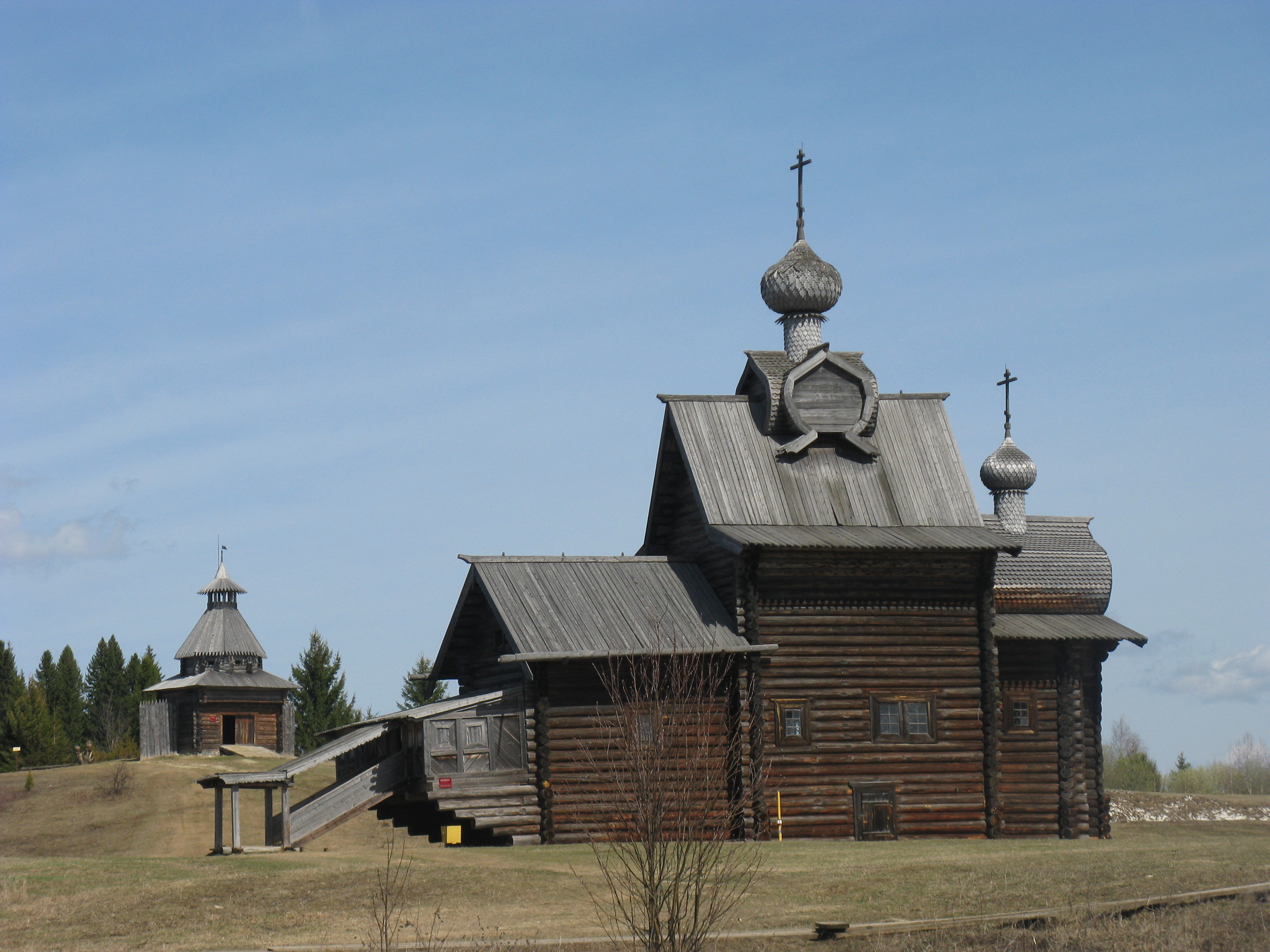
Khokhlovka

Perm Krai is home of several museums:

- Perm State Art Gallery
- Perm Museum of Local History
- Museum of Motovilikha Plants
- Architectural-Ethnographic Museum Khokhlovka and others.

Numerous architectural monuments are located in the small town of Usolye, in north of Perm Krai. Particularly important are the Saviour Cathedral, with a separate bell tower, and House of Stroganov.

There are many theaters in Perm, including the Perm Opera and Ballet Theater, the Perm Academic Theater, the Puppet Theater, the Theater for Young Spectators, the Theater "Near Bridge", and others.

There are many temples and convents in Perm Krai. The most significant of them are: Belogorsky Convent located in 85 km from Perm, Sludskaya Church, Fedosievskaya Church, Perm Mosque and others.

Ordinsky is home to the Orda underwater caves. Located near Orda village in Perm region, Ural, Orda Cave is also the biggest underwater gypsum crystal cave in the world.

== See also ==
- Klimova Treasure

== Sources ==
- Законодательное Собрание Пермского края. №32-ПК 27 апреля 2007 г. «Устав Пермского края». (Legislative Assembly of Perm Krai. #32-PK 27 April 2007 Charter of Perm Krai. ).
