= List of heads of federal subjects of Russia =

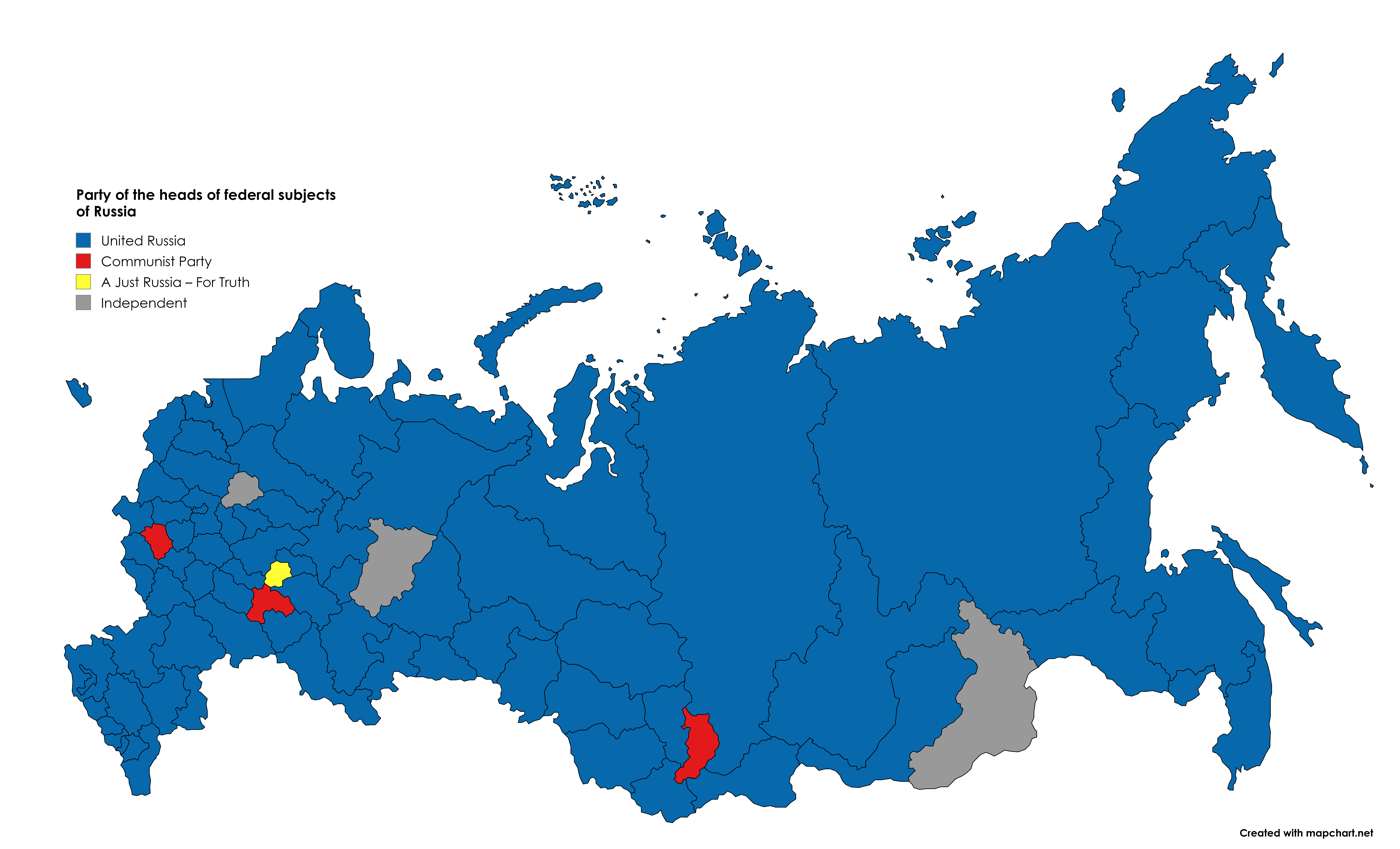
Map shows the Parties of the head of the federal subjects of Russia. Donetesk, Lugansk, Sevastopol and Zaporozhye not Included in this map.

The following is a list of heads of the federal subjects of the Russian Federation. The Republic of Crimea and the city of Sevastopol, along with the Donetsk People's Republic, Kherson Oblast, the Lugansk People's Republic and Zaporozhye Oblast were annexed by Russia between 2014 and 2022 and, according to its constitution, are Federal subjects. However, internationally these entities are recognized as part of Ukraine.

== Current ==
United Russia (83) Communist Party (3) Independent (2) A Just Russia (1)
Federal subject	Image	Governor	Party	Born	Took office	Term ends
Adygea; Head of the Republic		Murat Kumpilov	United Russia	27 February 1973 (age 53)	12 January 2017	2027
Altai Republic; Head of the Republic		Andrey Turchak	United Russia	20 December 1975 (age 50)	13 October 2024	2029
Bashkortostan; Head of the Republic		Radiy Khabirov	United Russia	20 March 1964 (age 62)	11 October 2018	2029
Buryatia; Head of the Republic		Alexey Tsydenov	United Russia	16 March 1976 (age 50)	8 February 2017	2027
Chechnya; Head of the Republic		Ramzan Kadyrov	United Russia	5 October 1976 (age 50)	15 February 2007	2031
Chuvashia; Head of the Republic		Oleg Nikolayev	A Just Russia	10 December 1969 (age 56)	29 January 2020	2030
Crimea (Note: De facto controlled by Russia but Crimea remains de jure internationally recognized part of Ukraine.); Head of the Republic		Sergey Aksyonov	United Russia	26 November 1972 (age 53)	14 April 2014	2029
Dagestan; Head of the Republic		Fyodor Shchukin	United Russia	4 August 1976 (age 50)	4 May 2026	2031
Donetsk (Note: Established in 2014 as a breakaway state in Eastern Ukraine, annexed by Russia following a controversial referendum in September 2022. Portions of the region are out of Russian control.); Head of the Republic		Denis Pushilin	United Russia	9 May 1981 (age 45)	4 October 2022	2028
Ingushetia; Head of the Republic		Mahmud-Ali Kalimatov	United Russia	9 April 1959 (age 67)	26 June 2019	2029
Kabardino-Balkaria; Head of the Republic		Kazbek Kokov	United Russia	20 July 1973 (age 53)	26 September 2018	2029
Kalmykia; Head of the Republic		Batu Khasikov	United Russia	28 June 1980 (age 46)	20 March 2019	2029
Karachay-Cherkessia; Head of the Republic		Rashid Temrezov	United Russia	14 March 1976 (age 50)	1 March 2011	2031
Karelia; Head of the Republic		Artur Parfenchikov	United Russia	29 November 1964 (age 61)	15 February 2017	2027
Khakassia; Head of the Republic		Valentin Konovalov	Communist Party	30 November 1987 (age 38)	11 November 2018	2028
Komi; Head of the Republic		Rostislav Goldstein	United Russia	15 March 1969 (age 57)	5 November 2024	2030
Lugansk; Head of the Republic		Leonid Pasechnik	United Russia	15 March 1970 (age 56)	4 October 2022	2028
Mari El; Head of the Republic		Yury Zaitsev	United Russia	16 December 1970 (age 55)	10 May 2022	2027
Mordovia; Head of the Republic		Artyom Zdunov	United Russia	18 May 1978 (age 48)	18 November 2020	2031
North Ossetia-Alania; Head of the Republic		Sergey Menyaylo	United Russia	22 August 1960 (age 66)	9 April 2021	2031
Sakha; Head of the Republic		Aysen Nikolaev	United Russia	22 January 1972 (age 54)	28 May 2018	2028
Tatarstan; Head of the Republic		Rustam Minnikhanov	United Russia	1 March 1957 (age 69)	25 March 2010	2030
Tuva; Head of the Republic		Vladislav Khovalyg	United Russia	24 December 1967 (age 58)	7 April 2021	2031
Udmurtia; Acting Head of the Republic		Olga Abramova	United Russia	23 November 1981 (age 44)	29 July 2026	2027
Altai Krai; Governor		Viktor Tomenko	United Russia	12 May 1971 (age 55)	30 May 2018	2028
Kamchatka Krai; Governor		Vladimir Solodov	United Russia	26 July 1982 (age 44)	3 April 2020	2030
Khabarovsk Krai; Governor		Dmitry Demeshin	United Russia	2 August 1976 (age 50)	13 May 2024	2029
Krasnodar Krai; Governor		Veniamin Kondratyev	United Russia	1 September 1970 (age 56)	22 April 2015	2030
Krasnoyarsk Krai; Governor		Mikhail Kotyukov	United Russia	21 December 1976 (age 49)	20 April 2023	2028
Perm Krai; Governor		Dmitry Makhonin	United Russia	18 October 1982 (age 44)	6 February 2020	2030
Primorsky Krai; Acting Governor		Konstantin Shestakov	United Russia	23 September 1982 (age 44)	22 October 2026	2027
Stavropol Krai; Governor		Vladimir Vladimirov	United Russia	14 October 1975 (age 51)	27 September 2013	2029
Zabaykalsky Krai; Governor		Aleksandr Osipov	Independent	28 September 1969 (age 57)	24 October 2018	2029
Amur Oblast; Governor		Vasily Orlov	United Russia	14 April 1975 (age 51)	30 May 2018	2028
Arkhangelsk Oblast; Governor		Alexander Tsybulsky	United Russia	15 July 1979 (age 47)	2 April 2020	2030
Astrakhan Oblast; Governor		Igor Babushkin	United Russia	5 April 1970 (age 56)	5 June 2019	2029
Belgorod Oblast; Governor		Alexander Shuvaev	United Russia	7 May 1981 (age 45)	13 May 2026	2031
Bryansk Oblast; Governor		Yegor Kovalchuk	United Russia	28 March 1973 (age 53)	13 May 2026	2031
Chelyabinsk Oblast; Governor		Aleksey Teksler	United Russia	19 January 1973 (age 53)	19 March 2019	2029
Irkutsk Oblast; Governor		Igor Kobzev	United Russia	29 October 1966 (age 60)	12 December 2019	2030
Ivanovo Oblast; Governor		Stanislav Voskresensky	United Russia	29 September 1976 (age 50)	10 October 2017	2028
Kaliningrad Oblast; Governor		Aleksey Besprozvannykh	United Russia	23 August 1979 (age 47)	15 May 2024	2029
Kaluga Oblast; Governor		Vladislav Shapsha	United Russia	20 September 1972 (age 54)	13 February 2020	2030
Kemerovo Oblast; Governor		Ilya Seredyuk	United Russia	15 May 1975 (age 51)	15 May 2024	2029
Kherson Oblast (Note: Occupied by Russia in February–March 2022, annexed following a controversial referendum in September 2022. Portions of the region are out of Russian control.); Governor		Vladimir Saldo	United Russia	12 June 1956 (age 70)	4 October 2022	2028
Kirov Oblast; Governor		Aleksandr Sokolov	United Russia	4 August 1970 (age 56)	10 May 2022	2027
Kostroma Oblast; Governor		Sergey Sitnikov	United Russia	18 January 1963 (age 63)	13 April 2012	2030
Kurgan Oblast; Governor		Vadim Shumkov	United Russia	9 March 1971 (age 55)	2 October 2018	2029
Kursk Oblast; Governor		Alexander Khinshtein	United Russia	26 October 1974 (age 52)	5 December 2024	2030
Leningrad Oblast; Governor		Aleksandr Drozdenko	United Russia	1 November 1964 (age 62)	28 May 2012	2030
Lipetsk Oblast; Governor		Igor Artamonov	United Russia	14 March 1967 (age 59)	2 October 2018	2029
Magadan Oblast; Governor		Sergey Nosov	United Russia	17 February 1961 (age 65)	28 May 2018	2028
Moscow Oblast; Governor		Andrey Vorobyov	United Russia	14 April 1970 (age 56)	8 November 2012	2028
Murmansk Oblast; Governor		Andrey Chibis	United Russia	19 March 1979 (age 47)	21 March 2019	2029
Nizhny Novgorod Oblast; Governor		Gleb Nikitin	United Russia	24 August 1977 (age 49)	26 September 2017	2028
Novgorod Oblast; Governor		Aleksandr Dronov	United Russia	5 July 1979 (age 47)	7 February 2025	2030
Novosibirsk Oblast; Governor		Andrey Travnikov	United Russia	1 February 1971 (age 55)	6 October 2017	2028
Omsk Oblast; Governor		Vitaliy Khotsenko	United Russia	18 March 1986 (age 40)	29 March 2023	2028
Orenburg Oblast; Governor		Yevgeny Solntsev	United Russia	28 September 1980 (age 46)	26 March 2025	2030
Oryol Oblast; Governor		Andrey Klychkov	Communist Party	9 May 1980 (age 46)	5 October 2017	2028
Penza Oblast; Governor		Oleg Melnichenko	United Russia	21 May 1973 (age 53)	26 March 2021	2031
Pskov Oblast; Governor		Mikhail Vedernikov	United Russia	7 March 1975 (age 51)	12 October 2017	2028
Rostov Oblast; Governor		Yury Slyusar	United Russia	20 July 1974 (age 52)	4 November 2024	2030
Ryazan Oblast; Governor		Pavel Malkov	United Russia	29 January 1980 (age 46)	10 May 2022	2027
Sakhalin Oblast; Governor		Valery Limarenko	United Russia	19 October 1960 (age 66)	7 December 2018	2029
Samara Oblast; Governor		Vyacheslav Fedorishchev	United Russia	14 July 1989 (age 37)	31 May 2024	2029
Saratov Oblast; Governor		Roman Busargin	United Russia	29 July 1981 (age 45)	10 May 2022	2027
Smolensk Oblast; Governor		Vasily Anokhin	United Russia	24 May 1983 (age 43)	17 March 2023	2029
Sverdlovsk Oblast; Governor		Denis Pasler	United Russia	29 October 1978 (age 48)	26 March 2025	2030
Tambov Oblast; Head of Oblast		Yevgeny Pervyshov	United Russia	4 May 1976 (age 50)	4 November 2024	2030
Tomsk Oblast; Governor		Vladimir Mazur	United Russia	19 June 1966 (age 60)	10 May 2022	2027
Tula Oblast; Governor		Dmitry Milyaev	United Russia	29 August 1975 (age 51)	14 May 2024	2029
Tver Oblast; Governor		Vitaly Korolyov	United Russia	23 June 1980 (age 46)	5 November 2025	2031
Tyumen Oblast; Governor		Aleksandr Moor	United Russia	6 January 1974 (age 52)	29 May 2018	2028
Ulyanovsk Oblast; Governor		Aleksey Russkikh	Communist Party	17 July 1968 (age 58)	8 April 2021	2031
Vladimir Oblast; Governor		Aleksandr Avdeyev	United Russia	12 August 1975 (age 51)	4 October 2021	2027
Volgograd Oblast; Governor		Andrey Bocharov	United Russia	14 October 1969 (age 57)	4 April 2014	2029
Vologda Oblast; Governor		Georgy Filimonov	United Russia	2 February 1980 (age 46)	31 October 2023	2029
Voronezh Oblast; Governor		Aleksandr Gusev	United Russia	27 July 1963 (age 63)	25 December 2017	2028
Yaroslavl Oblast; Governor		Mikhail Yevrayev	Independent	21 April 1971 (age 55)	12 October 2021	2027
Zaporizhzhia Oblast; Governor		Yevgeny Balitsky	United Russia	10 December 1969 (age 56)	4 October 2022	2028
Moscow; Mayor		Sergey Sobyanin	United Russia	21 June 1958 (age 68)	21 October 2010	2028
Saint Petersburg; Governor		Alexander Beglov	United Russia	19 May 1956 (age 70)	3 October 2018	2029
Sevastopol; Governor		Mikhail Razvozhayev	United Russia	12 September 1979 (age 47)	11 June 2019	2030
Jewish Autonomous Oblast; Governor		Maria Kostyuk	United Russia	2 March 1977 (age 49)	5 November 2024	2030
Chukotka Autonomous Okrug; Governor		Vladislav Kuznetsov	United Russia	18 March 1969 (age 57)	15 March 2023	2028
Khanty-Mansi Autonomous Okrug; Governor		Ruslan Kukharuk	United Russia	8 May 1979 (age 47)	30 May 2024	2029
Nenets Autonomous Okrug; Governor		Irina Gecht	United Russia	30 November 1969 (age 56)	18 March 2025	2030
Yamalo-Nenets Autonomous Okrug; Governor		Dmitry Artyukhov	United Russia	7 February 1988 (age 38)	29 May 2018	2028

== Former ==
This is a complete list of the former heads of the federal subjects of Russia.

- Republic of Adygea: Aslan Tkhakushinov (2007–2017), Khazret Sovmen (2002–2007), Aslan Dzharimov (1992–2002)
- Altai Republic: Oleg Khorokhordin (2019–2024), Alexander Berdnikov (2006–2019), Mikhail Lapshin (2002–2006), Semyon Zubakin (1998–2002), Vladilen Volkov (1997–1998), Valery Chaptynov (1994–1997)
- Republic of Bashkortostan: Rustem Khamitov (2010–2018), Murtaza Rakhimov (1993–2010)
- Republic of Buryatia: Vyacheslav Nagovitsyn (2007–2017), Leonid Potapov (1994–2007)
- Chechen Republic: Alu Alkhanov (2004–2007), Sergey Abramov (2004, acting), Akhmad Kadyrov (2003–2004), Anatoly Popov (2003, acting), Akhmad Kadyrov (2000–2003), Yakub Deniyev (1999–2000, acting), Doku Zagayev (1995–1996), Umar Avturkhanov (1993–1995)
- Chuvash Republic: Mikhail Ignatyev (2010–2020), Nikolay Fyodorov (1994–2010)
- Republic of Dagestan: Sergey Melikov (2020–2026), Vladimir Vasilyev (2017–2020), Ramazan Abdulatipov (2013–2017), Magomedsalam Magomedov (2010–2013), Mukhu Aliyev (2006–2010), Magomedali Magomedov (1994–2006)
- Republic of Ingushetia: Yunus-bek Yevkurov (2009–2019), Rashid Gaisanov (2009, acting), Yunus-bek Yevkurov (2008–2009), Murat Zyazikov (2002–2008), Akhmed Malsagov (2001–2002, acting), Ruslan Aushev (1993–2001)
- Kabardino-Balkarian Republic: Yury Kokov (2013–2018), Arsen Kanokov (2005–2013), Gennady Gubin (2005, acting), Valery Kokov (1992–2005)
- Republic of Kalmykia: Aleksey Orlov (2010–2019), Kirsan Ilyumzhinov (1993–2010)
- Karachay–Cherkess Republic: Boris Ebzeyev (2008–2011), Mustafa Batdyyev (2003–2008), Vladimir Semyonov (1999–2003), Valentin Vlasov (1999, acting), Igor Ivanov (1999, acting), Vladimir Khubiyev (1992–1999)
- Republic of Karelia: Aleksandr Hudilainen (2012–2017), Andrey Nelidov (2010–2012), Sergey Katanandov (1998–2010), Viktor Stepanov (1994–1998)
- Republic of Khakassia: Mikhail Razvozhayev (2018, acting), Viktor Zimin (2009–2018), Aleksey Lebed (1997–2009), Yevgeny Smirnov (1992–1997)
- Komi Republic: Vladimir Uyba (2020–2024), Sergey Gaplikov (2015–2020), Vyacheslav Gayzer (2010–2015), Vladimir Torlopov (2002–2010), Yury Spiridonov (1994–2002)
- Mari El Republic: Alexander Yevstifeyev (2017–2022), Leonid Markelov (2000–2017), Vyacheslav Kislitsyn (1997–2001), Vladislav Zotin (1991–1996)
- Republic of Mordovia: Vladimir Volkov (2012–2020), Nikolay Merkushkin (1995–2012), Vasily Guslyannikov (1991–1993)
- Republic of North Ossetia–Alania: Vyacheslav Bitarov (2016–2021), Tamerlan Aguzarov (2015–2016), Taymuraz Mamsurov (2005–2015), Alexander Dzasokhov (1998–2005), Akhsarbek Galazov (1994–1998)
- Sakha Republic: Yegor Borisov (2010–2018), Vyacheslav Shtyrov (2002–2010), Mikhail Nikolayev (1991–2002)
- Republic of Tatarstan: Mintimer Shaymiyev (1991–2010)
- Tyva Republic: Sholban Kara-ool (2007–2021), Sherig-ool Oorzhak (1992–2007)
- Udmurt Republic: Aleksandr Brechalov (2017–2026), Alexander Solovyov (2014–2017), Alexander Volkov (2000–2014)
- Altai Krai: Alexander Karlin (2005–2018), Mikhail Kozlov (2005, acting), Mikhail Evdokimov (2004–2005), Aleksandr Surikov (1996–2004), Lev Korshunov (1994–1996), Vladimir Rayfikesht (1991–1994)
- Kamchatka Krai: (Note: Kamchatka Krai was created on July 1, 2007 as a result of the merger of Kamchatka Oblast and Koryak Autonomous Okrug) Vladimir Ilyukhin (2011–2020), Aleksey Kuzmitsky (2007–2011)
  - Kamchatka Oblast: Aleksey Kuzmitsky (2007, acting), Mikhail Mashkovtsev (2000–2007), Vladimir Biryukov (1991–2000)
  - Koryak Autonomous Okrug: Oleg Kozhemyako (2005–2007), Vladimir Loginov (2000–2005), Valentina Bronevich (1996–2000), Sergey Lyoushkin (1991–1996)
- Khabarovsk Krai: Aleksandr Nikitin (2024, acting), Mikhail Degtyarev (2020–2024), Sergei Furgal (2018–2020), Vyacheslav Shport (2009–2018), Viktor Ishayev (1991–2009)
- Krasnodar Krai: Aleksandr Tkachyov (2001–2015), Nikolay Kondratenko (1997–2001), Nikolay Yegorov (1996–1997), Yevgeny Kharitonov (1994–1996), Viktor Gladskoy (1994, acting), Nikolay Yegorov (1992–1994), Viktor Kryuchkov (1992, acting), Vasily Dyakonov (1991–1992)
- Krasnoyarsk Krai: Viktor Tolokonsky (2014–2017), Lev Kuznetsov (2010–2014), Edkham Akbulatov (2010, acting), Alexander Khloponin (2002–2010), Nikolay Ashlapov (2002, acting), Alexander Lebed (1998–2002), Valery Zubov (1993–1998), Arkady Veprev (1991–1993)
  - Evenk Autonomous Okrug: Boris Zolotaryov (2001–2006), Aleksandr Bokovikov, (1997–2001), Anatoly Yakimov (1991–1997)
  - Taymyr Autonomous Okrug: Oleg Budargin (2003–2006), Sergey Nauman (2002–2003, acting), Alexander Khloponin (2001–2002), Gennady Nedelin (1991–2001)
- Perm Krai: (Note: Perm Krai was created on December 1, 2005 as a result of the merger of Komi-Permyak Autonomous Okrug and Perm Oblast) Maxim Reshetnikov (2017–2020), Viktor Basargin (2012–2017), Oleg Chirkunov (2005–2012)
  - Komi-Permyak Autonomous Okrug: Gennady Savelyev (2000–2005), Nikolay Poluyanov (1991–2000)
  - Perm Oblast: Oleg Chirkunov (2004–2005, acting); Yury Trutnev (2000–2004); Gennady Igumnov (1996–2000), Boris Kuznetsov (1991–1996)
- Primorsky Krai: Oleg Kozhemyako (2018–2026), Andrey Tarasenko (2017–2018, acting), Vladimir Miklushevsky (2012–2017), Sergey Darkin (2001–2012), Konstantin Tolstoshein (2001, acting), Igor Belchuk (2001, acting), Valentin Dubinin (2001, acting), Yevgeny Nazdratenko (1993–2001), Vladimir Kuznetsov (1991–1993)
- Stavropol Krai: Valery Zerenkov (2012–2013), Valery Gayevsky (2008–2012), Alexander Chernogorov (1996–2008), Pyotr Marchenko (1995–1996); Yevgeny Kuznetsov (1991–1995)
- Zabaykalsky Krai: (Note: Zabaykalsky Krai was created on March 1, 2008 as a result of the merger of Agin-Buryat Autonomous Okrug and Chita Oblast) Aleksandr Kulakov (2018, acting), Natalia Zhdanova (2016–2018), Konstantin Ilkovsky (2013–2016), Ravil Geniatulin (2008–2013)
  - Agin-Buryat Autonomous Okrug: Bair Zhamsuyev (1997–2008), Bolot Ayushiyev (1996–1997), Gurodarma Tsedashiyev (1991–1996)
  - Chita Oblast: Ravil Geniatulin (1996–2008), Boris Ivanov (1991–1996)
- Amur Oblast: Alexander Kozlov (2015–2018), Oleg Kozhemyako (2008–2015), Nikolay Kolesov (2007–2008), Aleksandr Nesterenko (2007, acting), Leonid Korotkov (2001–2007), Anatoly Belonogov (1997–2001), Yury Lyashko (1996–1997), Vladimir Dyachenko (1994–1996), Vladimir Polevanov (1993–1994), Aleksandr Surat (1993), Albert Krivchenko (1991–1993)
- Arkhangelsk Oblast: Igor Orlov (2012–2020), Ilya Mikhalchuk (2008–2012), Nikolay Kiselyov (2004–2008), Anatoly Yefremov (1996–2004), Valentin Vlasov (1996, acting), Pavel Balakshin (1991–1996)
- Astrakhan Oblast: Sergey Morozov (2018–2019, acting), Alexander Zhilkin (2004–2018), Aleksandr Glazkov (2004, acting), Anatoly Guzhvin (1991–2004)
- Belgorod Oblast: Vyacheslav Gladkov (2020–2026), Denis Butsayev (2020, acting), Yevgeny Savchenko (1993–2020), Viktor Berestovoy (1991–1993)
- Bryansk Oblast: Alexander Bogomaz (2014–2026), Nikolay Denin (2004–2014), Yury Lodkin (1996–2004), Aleksandr Semernyov (1996), Vladimir Barabanov (1995–1996), Vladimir Karpov (1993–1995), Yury Lodkin (1993), Vladimir Barabanov (1991–1993)
- Chelyabinsk Oblast: Boris Dubrovsky (2014–2019), Mikhail Yurevich (2010–2014), Pyotr Sumin (1996–2010), Vadim Solovyov (1991–1996)
- Irkutsk Oblast: Sergey Levchenko (2015–2019), Sergey Yeroshchenko (2012–2015), Dmitry Mezentsev (2009–2012), Sergey Sokol (2009, acting), Igor Yesipovsky (2008–2009), Aleksandr Tishanin (2005–2008), Boris Govorin (1997–2005), Vitaly Ivanov (1997, acting), Yury Nozhikov (1991–1997)
  - Ust-Orda Buryat Autonomous Okrug: Aleksandr Tishanin (2007, acting), Valery Maleyev (1996–2007), Aleksey Batagayev (1991–1996)
- Ivanovo Oblast: Pavel Konkov (2013–2017), Mikhail Men (2005–2013), Yury Tokayev (2005, acting), Vladimir Tikhonov (2000–2005), Vladislav Tikhomirov (1996–2000), Adolf Laptev (1991–1996)
- Kaliningrad Oblast: Sergei Yeliseyev (2024, acting), Anton Alikhanov (2017–2024), Yevgeny Zinichev (2016, acting), Nikolay Tsukanov (2010–2016), Georgy Boos (2005–2010), Vladimir Yegorov (2000–2005), Leonid Gorbenko (1996–2000), Yuri Matochkin (1991–1996)
- Kaluga Oblast: Anatoly Artamonov (2000–2020), Valery Sudarenkov (1996–2000), Oleg Savchenko (1996), Viktor Pakhno (1996, acting), Aleksandr Deryagin (1991–1996)
- Kemerovo Oblast: Sergey Tsivilyov (2018–2024), Aman Tuleyev (2001–2018), Valentin Mazikin (2001, acting), Aman Tuleyev (1997–2001), Mikhail Kislyuk (1991–1997)
- Kirov Oblast: Igor Vasilyev (2016–2022), Aleksey Kuznetsov (2016, acting), Nikita Belykh (2009–2016), Nikolay Shaklein (2004–2009), Vladimir Sergeyenkov (1996–2004), Vasily Desyatnikov (1991–1996)
- Kostroma Oblast: Igor Slyunyayev (2007–2012), Yury Tsykunov (2007, acting), Viktor Shershunov (1996–2007), Valery Arbuzov (1991–1996)
- Kurgan Oblast: Aleksey Kokorin (2014–2018), Oleg Bogomolov (1997–2014), Anatoly Sobolev (1995–1997), Valentin Gerasimov (1991–1995)
- Kursk Oblast: Alexei Smirnov (2024), Roman Starovoyt (2018–2024), Alexander Mikhaylov (2000–2018), Aleksandr Rutskoy (1996–2000), Vasily Shuteyev (1991–1996)
- Leningrad Oblast: Valery Serdyukov (1998–2012), Vadim Gustov (1996–1998), Alexander Belyakov (1991–1996)
- Lipetsk Oblast: Oleg Korolyov (1998–2018), Mikhail Narolin (1993–1998), Vladimir Zaytsev (1992–1993, acting), Gennady Kuptsov (1991–1992)
- Magadan Oblast: Vladimir Pechyony (2013–2018); Nikolay Dudov (2002–2013), Valentin Tsvetkov (1996–2002), Viktor Mikhailov (1991–1996)
- Moscow Oblast: Ruslan Tsalikov (2012, acting), Sergey Shoygu (2012), Boris Gromov (2000–2012), Vasily Golubev (1999–2000, acting), Anatoly Tyazhlov (1991–1999)
- Murmansk Oblast: Marina Kovtun (2012–2019), Dmitry Dmitriyenko (2009–2012), Yury Yevdokimov (1996–2009), Yevgeny Komarov (1991–1996)
- Nizhny Novgorod Oblast: Valery Shantsev (2005–2017), Gennady Khodyrev (2001–2005), Ivan Sklyarov (1997–2001), Yury Lebedev (1997, acting), Boris Nemtsov (1991–1997)
- Novgorod Oblast: Andrey Nikitin (2017–2025), Sergey Mitin (2007–2017), Mikhail Prusak (1991–2007)
- Novosibirsk Oblast: Vladimir Gorodetsky (2014–2017), Vasily Yurchenko (2010–2014), Viktor Tolokonsky (2000–2010), Vitaly Mukha (1995–2000), Ivan Indinok (1993–1995), Vitaly Mukha (1991–1993)
- Omsk Oblast: Alexaner Burkov (2017–2023), Viktor Nazarov (2012–2017), Leonid Polezhayev (1991–2012)
- Orenburg Oblast: Denis Pasler (2019–2025), Yury Berg (2010–2019), Alexey Chernyshov (1999–2010), Vladimir Yelagin (1991–1999)
- Oryol Oblast: Vadim Potomsky (2014–2017), Aleksandr Kozlov (2009–2014), Yegor Stroyev (1993–2009), Nikolay Yudin (1991–1993)
- Penza Oblast: Nikolay Simonov (2021, acting), Ivan Belozertsev (2015–2021), Vasily Bochkaryov (1998–2015), Anatoly Kovlyagin (1993–1998), Aleksandr Kondratyev (1991–1993)
- Pskov Oblast: Andrey Turchak (2009–2017), Mikhail Kuznetsov (2004–2009), Yevgeny Mikhailov (1996–2004), Vladislav Tumanov (1992–1996), Yury Shmatov (1992, acting), Anatoly Dobryakov (1991–1992)
- Rostov Oblast: Vasily Golubev (2010–2024), Vladimir Chub (1991–2010)
- Ryazan Oblast: Nikolay Lyubimov (2017–2022), Oleg Kovalyov (2008–2017), Georgy Shpak (2004–2008), Vyacheslav Lyubimov (1997–2004), Igor Ivlev (1996–1997, acting), Gennady Merkulov (1994–1996), Lev Bashmakov (1991–1994)
- Sakhalin Oblast: Vera Shcherbina (2018, acting), Oleg Kozhemyako (2015–2018), Alexander Khoroshavin (2007–2015), Ivan Malakhov (2003–2007), Igor Farkhutdinov (1995–2003), Yevgeny Krasnoyarov (1993–1995), Valentin Fyodorov (1991–1993)
- Samara Oblast: Dmitry Azarov (2017–2024), Nikolay Merkushkin (2012–2017), Vladimir Artyakov (2007–2012), Konstantin Titov (2000–2007), Yury Logoydo (2000, acting), Konstantin Titov (1991–2000)
- Saratov Oblast: Valery Radayev (2012–2022), Pavel Ipatov (2005–2012), Dmitry Ayatskov (1996–2005), Leonid Vashchenkov (1996, acting), Yury Belykh (1992–1996)
- Smolensk Oblast: Alexey Ostrovsky (2012–2023), Sergey Antufyev (2007–2012), Viktor Maslov (2002–2007), Aleksandr Prokhorov (1998–2002), Anatoly Glushenkov (1993–1998), Valery Fateyev (1991–1993)
- Sverdlovsk Oblast: Yevgeny Kuyvashev (2012–2025), Alexander Misharin (2009–2012), Eduard Rossel (1995–2009), Aleksey Strakhov (1994–1995), Valery Trushnikov (1993–1994, acting), Eduard Rossel (1991–1993)
- Tambov Oblast: Maksim Yegorov (2021–2024), Alexander Nikitin (2015–2021), Oleg Betin (1999–2015), Aleksandr Ryabov (1995–1999), Oleg Betin (1995), Vladimir Babenko (1991–1995)
- Tomsk Oblast: Sergey Zhvachkin (2012–2022), Viktor Kress (1991–2012)
- Tula Oblast: Aleksey Dyumin (2016–2024), Vladimir Gruzdev (2011–2016), Vyacheslav Dudka (2005–2011), Vasiliy Starodubtsev (1997–2005), Nikolai Sevryugin (1991–1997)
- Tver Oblast: Marina Podtikhova (2025, acting), Igor Rudenya (2016–2025), Andrey Shevelyov (2011–2016), Dmitry Zelenin (2003–2011), Vladimir Platov (1995–2003), Vladimir Suslov (1991–1995)
- Tyumen Oblast: Sergey Sarychev (2018, acting), Vladimir Yakushev (2005–2018), Sergey Smetanyuk (2005, acting), Sergey Sobyanin (2001–2005), Leonid Roketsky (1993–2001), Yury Shafranik (1991–1993)
- Ulyanovsk Oblast: Sergei Morozov (2005–2021), Maria Bolshakova (2004–2005, acting), Mikhail Shkanov (2004, acting), Vladimir Shamanov (2001–2004), Yury Goryachev (1992–2001), Valentin Malafeyev (1991)
- Vladimir Oblast: Vladimir Sipyagin (2018–2021), Svetlana Orlova (2013–2018), Nikolay Vinogradov (1996–2013), Yury Vlasov (1991–1996)
- Volgograd Oblast: Sergey Bozhenov (2012–2014), Anatoly Brovko (2010–2012), Nikolay Maksyuta (1997–2010), Ivan Shabunin (1991–1997)
- Vologda Oblast: Oleg Kuvshinnikov (2011–2023), Vyacheslav Pozgalyov (1996–2011), Nikolay Podgornov (1991–1996)
- Voronezh Oblast: Alexey Gordeyev (2009–2017), Vladimir Kulakov (2000–2009), Ivan Shabanov (1996–2000), Aleksandr Tsapin (1996), Aleksandr Kovalyov (1992–1996), Viktor Kalasnikov (1991–1992)
- Yaroslavl Oblast: Dmitry Mironov (2017–2021), Sergey Yastrebov (2012–2017), Sergey Vakhrukov (2007–2012), Anatoly Lisitsyn (1991–2007)
- Moscow: Vladimir Resin (2010, acting), Yury Luzhkov (1992–2010), Gavriil Popov (1991–1992)
- Saint Petersburg: Georgy Poltavchenko (2011–2018), Valentina Matviyenko (2003–2011), Alexander Beglov (acting, 2003), Vladimir Yakovlev (1996–2003), Anatoly Sobchak (1991–1996)
- Sevastopol: (Note: De facto controlled by Russia but Crimea remains de jure internationally recognized part of Ukraine.) Dmitry Ovsyannikov (2016–2019), Sergey Menyaylo (2014–2016), Aleksei Chaly (2014, acting)
- Jewish Autonomous Oblast: Rostislav Goldstein (2019–2024), Alexander Levintal (2015–2019), Alexander Vinnikov (2010–2015), Nikolay Volkov (1991–2010)
- Chukotka Autonomous Okrug: Roman Kopin (2008–2023), Roman Abramovich (2001–2008), Aleksandr Nazarov (1991–2001)
- Khanty–Mansi Autonomous Okrug: Natalya Komarova (2010–2024), Alexander Filipenko (1991–2010)
- Nenets Autonomous Okrug: Yury Bezdudny (2020–2025), Alexander Tsybulsky (2017–2020), Igor Koshin (2014–2017), Igor Fyodorov (2009–2014), Valery Potapenko (2006–2009), Aleksandr Sharenkov (2006, acting), Alexey Barinov (2005–2006), Vladimir Butov (1996–2005), Vladimir Khabarov (1996), Yury Komarovsky (1991–1996)
- Yamalo-Nenets Autonomous Okrug: Dmitry Kobylkin (2010–2018), Yury Neyolov (1994–2010), Lev Bayandin (1991–1994)
