= 2003 Russian gubernatorial elections =

- 26 January – 21 December 2003

23 Heads of Federal Subjects from 89
- 2003 Russian regional elections: Gubernatorial Legislative Gubernatorial and legislative Referendum Referendum and gubernatorial

Gubernatorial elections in 2003 were held in 23 federal subjects of Russia. 16 incumbent governors re-elected.

== Race summary ==
| Federal subject | Incumbent | Incumbent since | Election day | Candidates | Result |
|---|---|---|---|---|---|
| Taymyr AO (snap election) | Alexander Khloponin (resigned) (Note: Elected governor of Krasnoyarsk Krai in September 2002.); Sergey Nauman (acting) | 2001 | 26 January | ✓ Oleg Budargin 68.89%; Gennady Subbotkin 7.05%; Against all 12.59% | New governor elected to a vacant position. |
| Magadan Oblast (snap election) | Valentin Tsvetkov (died in office); Nikolay Dudov (acting) | 1996 | 2 February (first round) | Nikolay Karpenko (backed by UR) 37.55%; Nikolay Dudov 26.04%; Andrey Zinchenko 10.20%; Aleksandr Sechkin 8.97%; Against all 5.78% | Acting governor elected for a full term. |
| Magadan Oblast (snap election) | Valentin Tsvetkov (died in office); Nikolay Dudov (acting) | 1996 | 16 February (runoff) | ✓ Nikolay Dudov 50.44%; Nikolay Karpenko 42.33%; Against all 6.21% | Acting governor elected for a full term. |
| Mordovia | Nikolay Merkushkin | 1995 | 16 February | ✓ Nikolay Merkushkin 87.34%; Anatoly Chubukov (CPRF) 7.01% | Incumbent re-elected. |
| Belgorod Oblast | Yevgeny Savchenko | 1993 | 25 May | ✓ Yevgeny Savchenko 61.15%; Vasily Altukhov (CPRF) 21.93%; Against all 9.99% | Incumbent re-elected. |
| Karachay-Cherkessia | Vladimir Semyonov | 1999 | 17 August (first round) | Mustafa Batdyyev 41.52%; Vladimir Semyonov 37.29%; Islam Burlakov 12.80% | Incumbent lost re-election. New president elected. |
| Karachay-Cherkessia | Vladimir Semyonov | 1999 | 31 August (runoff) | ✓ Mustafa Batdyyev 47.97%; Vladimir Semyonov 46.41% | Incumbent lost re-election. New president elected. |
| Novgorod Oblast | Mikhail Prusak | 1991 | 7 September | ✓ Mikhail Prusak 78.73%; Vladimir Dugenets 4.39%; Aleksandr Sevastyanov 4.34% | Incumbent re-elected. |
| Omsk Oblast | Leonid Polezhayev | 1991 | 7 September | ✓ Leonid Polezhayev 57.27%; Leonid Mayevsky (CPRF) 28.59% | Incumbent re-elected. |
| Sverdlovsk Oblast | Eduard Rossel | 1995 | 7 September (first round) | Eduard Rossel (UR) 42.85%; Anton Bakov 14.43%; Andrey Vikharev 13.68%; Yury Kuznetsov (Yabloko) 7.23%; Nyazip Sarvarov (RCWP) 5.30%; Against all 12.70% | Incumbent re-elected. |
| Sverdlovsk Oblast | Eduard Rossel | 1995 | 21 September (runoff) | ✓ Eduard Rossel (UR) 55.53%; Anton Bakov 29.97%; Against all 13.06% | Incumbent re-elected. |
| Leningrad Oblast | Valery Serdyukov | 1999 | 21 September | ✓ Valery Serdyukov 56.85%; Vadim Gustov 25.26%; Against all 7.75% | Incumbent re-elected. |
| Tomsk Oblast | Viktor Kress | 1991 | 21 September | ✓ Viktor Kress 70.10%; Aleksandr Pomorov (CPRF) 12.75% | Incumbent re-elected. |
| Saint Petersburg (snap election) | Vladimir Yakovlev (resigned); Alexander Beglov (acting) | 1996 | 21 September (first round) | Valentina Matviyenko 48.73%; Anna Markova 15.84%; Sergey Belyayev 8.08%; Mikhail Amosov (Yabloko) 7.05%; Konstantin Sukhenko 5.10%; Against all 10.97% | New governor elected to a vacant position. |
| Saint Petersburg (snap election) | Vladimir Yakovlev (resigned); Alexander Beglov (acting) | 1996 | 5 October (runoff) | ✓ Valentina Matviyenko 63.20%; Anna Markova 24.14%; Against all 11.75% | New governor elected to a vacant position. |
| Chechnya | Akhmad Kadyrov | 2000 (Note: Head of the Chechen Republic Administration from 12 June 2000, appointed by federal president.) | 5 October | ✓ Akhmad Kadyrov 80.84%; Abdulla Bugayev 5.77%; Shamil Burayev 3.95% | New president elected to a vacant position. |
| Bashkortostan | Murtaza Rakhimov | 1993 | 7 December (first round) | Murtaza Rakhimov 42.59%; Sergey Veremeenko 25.38%; Ralif Safin 23.04% | Incumbent re-elected. |
| Bashkortostan | Murtaza Rakhimov | 1993 | 21 December (runoff) | ✓ Murtaza Rakhimov 78.01%; Sergey Veremeenko 15.84% | Incumbent re-elected. |
| Kirov Oblast (snap election) | Vladimir Sergeyenkov | 1996 | 7 December (first round) | Nikolay Shaklein 33.82%; Oleg Valenchuk (UR dissident) 13.92%; Vyacheslav Torsunov 10.25%; Aleksandr Strelnikov (UR support) 8.84%; Vasily Kiselyov 5.62%; Against all 10.23% | Incumbent term-limited. New governor elected. |
| Kirov Oblast (snap election) | Vladimir Sergeyenkov | 1996 | 21 December (runoff) | ✓ Nikolay Shaklein 62.77%; Oleg Valenchuk 26.32%; Against all 10.08% | Incumbent term-limited. New governor elected. |
| Moscow | Yury Luzhkov | 1992 | 7 December | ✓ Yury Luzhkov (UR) 74.83%; Alexander Lebedev 12.78%; German Sterligov 3.65%; Against all 7.17% | Incumbent re-elected. |
| Moscow Oblast | Boris Gromov | 1999 | 7 December | ✓ Boris Gromov (UR) 83.04%; Aleksey Mitrofanov (LDPR) 4.14%; Against all 9.73% | Incumbent re-elected. |
| Novosibirsk Oblast | Viktor Tolokonsky | 1999 | 7 December | ✓ Viktor Tolokonsky 57.67%; Mikhail Titov (backed by local CPRF) 17.80%; Ivan Starikov (SPS) 9.78%; Yevgeny Loginov 5.35%; Against all 5.40% | Incumbent re-elected. |
| Orenburg Oblast | Alexey Chernyshyov | 1999 | 7 December | ✓ Alexey Chernyshyov (APR) 63.38%; Oleg Naumov (SPS) 10.55%; Rinat Khamiyev 5.76%; Against all 9.08% | Incumbent re-elected. |
| Sakhalin Oblast (snap election) | Igor Farkhutdinov (died in office); Ivan Malakhov (acting) | 1995 | 7 December (first round) | Ivan Malakhov (backed by UR) 35.17%; Fyodor Sidorenko 19.55%; Anatoly Chyorny 8.56%; Vladimir Varennikov 5.43%; Svetlana Ivanova (CPRF) 5.11%; Against all 8.39% | Acting governor elected for a full term. |
| Sakhalin Oblast (snap election) | Igor Farkhutdinov (died in office); Ivan Malakhov (acting) | 1995 | 21 December (runoff) | ✓ Ivan Malakhov 53.01%; Fyodor Sidorenko 34.26%; Against all 11.68% | Acting governor elected for a full term. |
| Tambov Oblast | Oleg Betin | 1999 | 7 December | ✓ Oleg Betin (backed by UR) 71.08%; Aleksandr Zhalnin 8.96%; Against all 10.89% | Incumbent re-elected. |
| Tver Oblast | Vladimir Platov | 1995 | 7 December (first round) | Dmitry Zelenin (backed by UR, LDPR, SPS) 42.49%; Igor Zubov 14.59%; Tatyana Astrakhankina (CPRF) 12.85%; Vladimir Platov 12.45% | Incumbent lost re-election. New governor elected. |
| Tver Oblast | Vladimir Platov | 1995 | 21 December (runoff) | ✓ Dmitry Zelenin 57.42%; Igor Zubov 33.85%; Against all 8.74% | Incumbent lost re-election. New governor elected. |
| Vologda Oblast | Vyacheslav Pozgalyov | 1996 | 7 December | ✓ Vyacheslav Pozgalyov (backed by UR) 82.93%; Vyacheslav Stepanov (SPS) 5.00%; Against all 8.81% | Incumbent re-elected. |
| Yaroslavl Oblast | Anatoly Lisitsyn | 1991 | 7 December | ✓ Anatoly Lisitsyn (backed by UR) 73.15%; Sergey Zagidullin (Rodina) 10.50%; Oleg Vinogradov (SPS) 6.84%; Against all 7.20% | Incumbent re-elected. |
