= 2026 Karachay-Cherkess head election =

Regional legislative election in Russia

- 20 September 2026
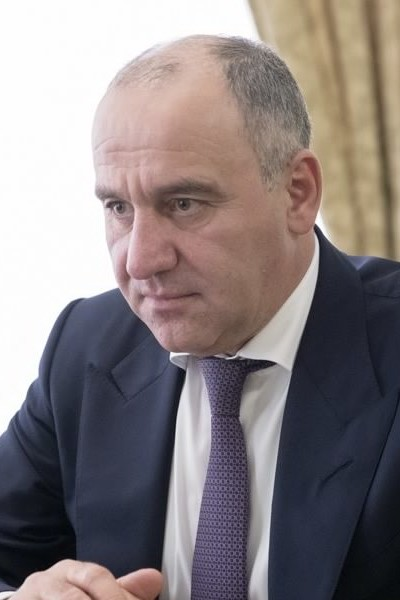
Candidate	Rashid Temrezov
Party	United Russia
Electoral vote	48
Percentage	100%
Head before election
Rashid Temrezov
United Russia
Head-elect
Rashid Temrezov
United Russia
Senator before election
Krym Kazanokov
United Russia
Senator after election
Krym Kazanokov
United Russia

The 2026 Karachay-Cherkess Republic head election took place on 20 September 2026, on common election day, to elect the Head of the Karachay-Cherkess Republic. Incumbent Head Rashid Temrezov was unanimously re-elected for a fourth term in office. Head of Karachay-Cherkessia is elected by the People's Assembly of the Karachay-Cherkess Republic.

== Background ==
In February 2011 then-President of Karachay-Cherkessia Boris Ebzeyev announced his resignation, just two years into his first term. President of Russia Dmitry Medvedev accepted Ebzeyev's resignation and appointed Rashid Temrezov, Member of People's Assembly of the Karachay-Cherkess Republic and road transportation official, as acting President of Karachay-Cherkessia. In March 2011 Temrezov was confirmed for a full term unanimously by the People's Assembly of Karachay-Cherkessia. Temrezov won re-election in 2016 and 2021, both times unanimously as well.

Early in his term Temrezov was credited with restoring ethnic and elite balance in Karachay-Cherkessia which was disrupted by his predecessor Ebzeyev. A major development occurred in January 2019, when Senator Rauf Arashukov and his father, Gazprom executive Raul Arashukov were arrested for two murders and controlling a criminal organization, as Arashukovs had been a very influential Circassian clan. In August 2020 Temrezov was named among governors who were most likely to be replaced, however, Temrezov improved his management and was able to be endorsed by President Vladimir Putin for a third term. By January 2026 Temrezov was again viewed likely to retire due to his tenure and socio-economic failures, however, Temrezov himself allegedly tried to set himself up for a record fourth term. A major blow to Temrezov's position was dealt in March 2026 when Prosecutor General of Russia filed a suit to Senator Akhmat Salpagarov, member of the same Karachay clan as Temrezov, in order to seize assets acquired through corruption worth 4 billion rubles.

== Candidates ==
Head of the Karachay-Cherkess Republic is elected indirectly, by the People's Assembly of the Karachay-Cherkess Republic, for the term of five years. Candidate for Head of Karachay-Cherkessia should be a Russian citizen and at least 30 years old. Candidates for Head of Karachay-Cherkessia should not have a foreign citizenship or residence permit. Candidates for Head of Karachay-Cherkessia are nominated by political parties, which have factions either in the People's Assembly of Karachay-Cherkessia or in the State Duma, and the parties can nominate up to three candidates each. President of Russia then selects three nominated candidates and submits them to the People's Assembly of Karachay-Cherkessia. The People's Assembly elects Head of Karachay-Cherkessia with a simple majority. Also head candidates present 3 candidacies to the Federation Council and election winner later appoints one of the presented candidates.

The following parties are eligible to nominate a candidate for Head of Karachay-Cherkessia:

- United Russia
- Communist Party of the Russian Federation
- Liberal Democratic Party of Russia
- A Just Russia
- New People
- Civic Platform

=== Declared ===
Candidate name, political party	Occupation	Status	Ref.
Aleksandr Chayka; Liberal Democratic Party	Member of People's Assembly of the Karachay-Cherkess Republic (2019–present)	Submitted by the President	
Krym Shnakhov; A Just Russia	Member of People's Assembly of the Karachay-Cherkess Republic (2019–present)	Submitted by the President	
Rashid Temrezov; United Russia	Incumbent Head of the Karachay-Cherkess Republic (2011–present)	Submitted by the President	

=== Candidates for Federation Council ===
Head candidate, political party	Candidates for Federation Council	Status
Rashid Temrezov; United Russia	* Igor Gonov, Member of People's Assembly of the Karachay-Cherkess Republic (2019–present) * Fatima Kardanova, Member of People's Assembly of the Karachay-Cherkess Republic (2019–present) * Krym Kazanokov, incumbent Senator (2016, 2019–present)	Submitted by the President

== Results ==
Summary of the 20 September 2026 Karachay-Cherkess head election results
Candidate	Party	Votes	%
Rashid Temrezov (incumbent)	United Russia	48	100.00
Aleksandr Chayka	Liberal Democratic Party	0	0.00
Krym Shnakhov	A Just Russia	0	0.00
Valid votes		48	100.00
Blank ballots		0	0.00
Total		48	100.00
Turnout		48	96.00
Registered voters		50	100.00

Head Temrezov re-appointed incumbent Senator Krym Kazanokov (United Russia) to the Federation Council.

== See also ==
- 2026 Russian regional elections
