= Vladimir Malygin =

Russian diplomat

- Владимир Малыгин

Ambassador of Russia to Malta
- In office 12 December 2014 – 29 October 2021
- President: Vladimir Putin
- Preceded by: Boris Marchuk
- Succeeded by: Andrei Lopukhov

Personal details
- Born: 19 June 1950 (age 76)
- Parent: Ardalion Malygin (father)
- Education: Moscow State Institute of International Relations
- Awards: Order of Friendship; Medal of the Order "For Merit to the Fatherland" Second Class; Honoured Worker of the Ministry of Foreign Affairs of the Russian Federation

Vladimir Ardalionovich Malygin (Russian: Владимир Ардалионович Малыгин; born 19 June 1950) is a Russian diplomat. He has served in various diplomatic roles since the 1970s, and was the Ambassador of Russia to Malta between December 2014 and October 2021.

== Career ==
Malygin was born on 19 June 1950, the son of Ardalion Malygin, a party worker and employee of the Soviet state security organs, who reached the rank of lieutenant general. Vladimir Malygin studied at the Moscow State Institute of International Relations, graduating in 1972 and beginning work for the Soviet Ministry of Foreign Affairs. His work included postings within the central apparatus of the Ministry, which after the dissolution of the Soviet Union in 1991 became the Russian Ministry of Foreign Affairs, and abroad. During the Soviet and later Russian periods he worked in the embassies in Sweden, the United Kingdom, and Cyprus. He undertook further studies at the Diplomatic Academy of the Ministry of Foreign Affairs, graduating in 1989. On 18 September 1996 he was awarded the diplomatic rank of Extraordinary and Plenipotentiary Envoy 2nd class.

In 2000 Malygin was appointed Deputy Director of the Ministry's General Secretariat, followed by a posting from 2003 as consul general in Edinburgh. He held this post until 2009, having received the diplomatic rank of Extraordinary and Plenipotentiary Envoy 1st class, on 29 December 2005. Between 2009 and 2012 he was Deputy Director of the Ministry's Department of Security, and then from 2012 until 2014 Malygin was consul general in Klaipėda, Lithuania. He then became Deputy Director of the Ministry's Second European Department in June 2014, before being appointed Ambassador of Russia to Malta on 12 December 2014. He served in this role until his retirement on 29 October 2021.

== Personal life and awards ==
In addition to his native Russian, Malygin speaks English and Swedish. He is married to Tatyana, and currently holds the diplomatic rank of Ambassador Extraordinary and Plenipotentiary, awarded on 17 October 2016. Over his career he has been awarded the Order of Friendship, on 30 March 2020; the Medal of the Order "For Merit to the Fatherland" Second Class, on 29 October 2010; and the title of Honoured Worker of the Ministry of Foreign Affairs of the Russian Federation.
