= Pavel Balakshin =

Russian politician (1936–2024)

- Павел Балакшин
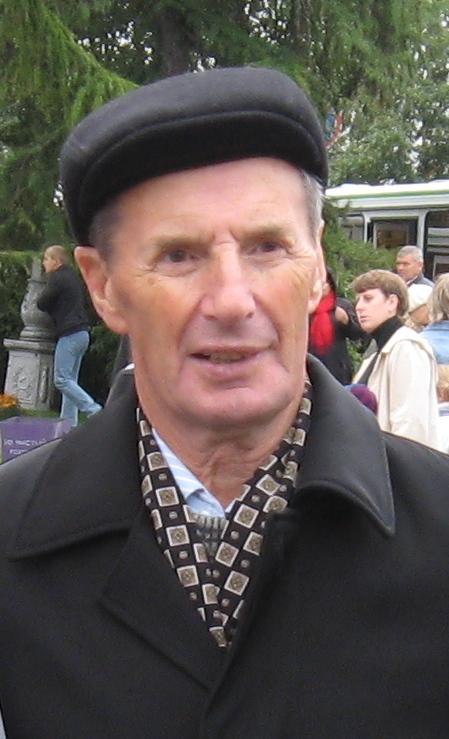
- Balakshin in 2011

4th Mayor of Arkhangelsk
- In office 14 December 1996 – 14 December 2000
- Preceded by: Vladimir Gerasimov
- Succeeded by: Oleg Nilov

1st Head of Administration of Arkhangelsk Oblast
- In office 19 September 1991 – 21 February 1996
- Succeeded by: Valentin Vlasov (acting); Anatoly Yefremov

Personal details
- Born: 10 July 1936; Dementyevo, Kotlassky District, Northern Krai, Russian SFSR, USSR
- Died: 15 April 2024 (aged 87)
- Political party: Our Home - Russia

Pavel Nikolayevich Balakshin (Russian: Павел Николаевич Балакшин, 10 July 1936 – 15 April 2024) was a Russian politician. He was the first Head of Administration of his home region, Arkhangelsk Oblast, from 1991 to 1996.

== Biography ==
Pavel Balakshin was born in the village of Dementyevo, Kotlassky District, Northern Krai (now Arkhangelsk Oblast) in a Russian working-class family. He began his career in 1952 at the Mir collective farm. He worked as a buoy operator, sailor, helmsman in the Northern river Shipping Company, then as a locksmith on the railway. From 1955 to 1958, he served in the Soviet Armed Forces as a mechanic of radar equipment. In 1959–85 he worked at the Kotlas Pulp and Paper Mill in Koryazhma. From 1987 to 1990 he was director general of Arkhangelsk Pulp and Paper Mill, Novodvinsk.

From 1990 to 1991 he was Chairman of the Executive Committee of the Arkhangelsk Regional Council of People's Deputies. On 19 September 1991, by the Decree of the President of Russia Boris Yeltsin, Balakshin was appointed head of administration of Arkhangelsk Oblast. In December 1993 he was elected a deputy of the Federation Council of the first convocation from Arkhangelsk Oblast. During Balakshin's administration, in 1995, dismantling of nuclear submarines in Severodvinsk began along with removal of radioactive waste from the harbor.

In January 1996 he became a member of the second Federation Council. He was elected a member of its Committee on Federation Affairs, Treaty of Federation and Regional Policy. On 21 February, Balakshin was ousted from his post by presidential decree "for gross violations when using targeted loans, allocated for the delivery of products to the regions of the Far North." On 15 March 1996, Balakshin was removed from the Federation Council.

On 8 December 1996, Balakshin became the first mayor of Arkhangelsk to be directly elected. He occupied this position for the next four years.

Balakshin died on 15 April 2024, at the age of 87.

== Awards ==
- Order "For Merit to the Fatherland" 4th class (6 January 1999) — for services to the state, high achievements in production activities and a great contribution to strengthening friendship and cooperation between the nations
- Honorary Citizen of the city of Arkhangelsk (28 April 2011)
- Order of the Red Banner of Labor
- Order of the October Revolution
- USSR State Prize in science and technology (1982, as a part of collective) — for the development of new technologies for the production of paper and cardboard
