= Mikhail Smirnovsky =

Soviet diplomat (1921–1989)

- Леонид Смирновский
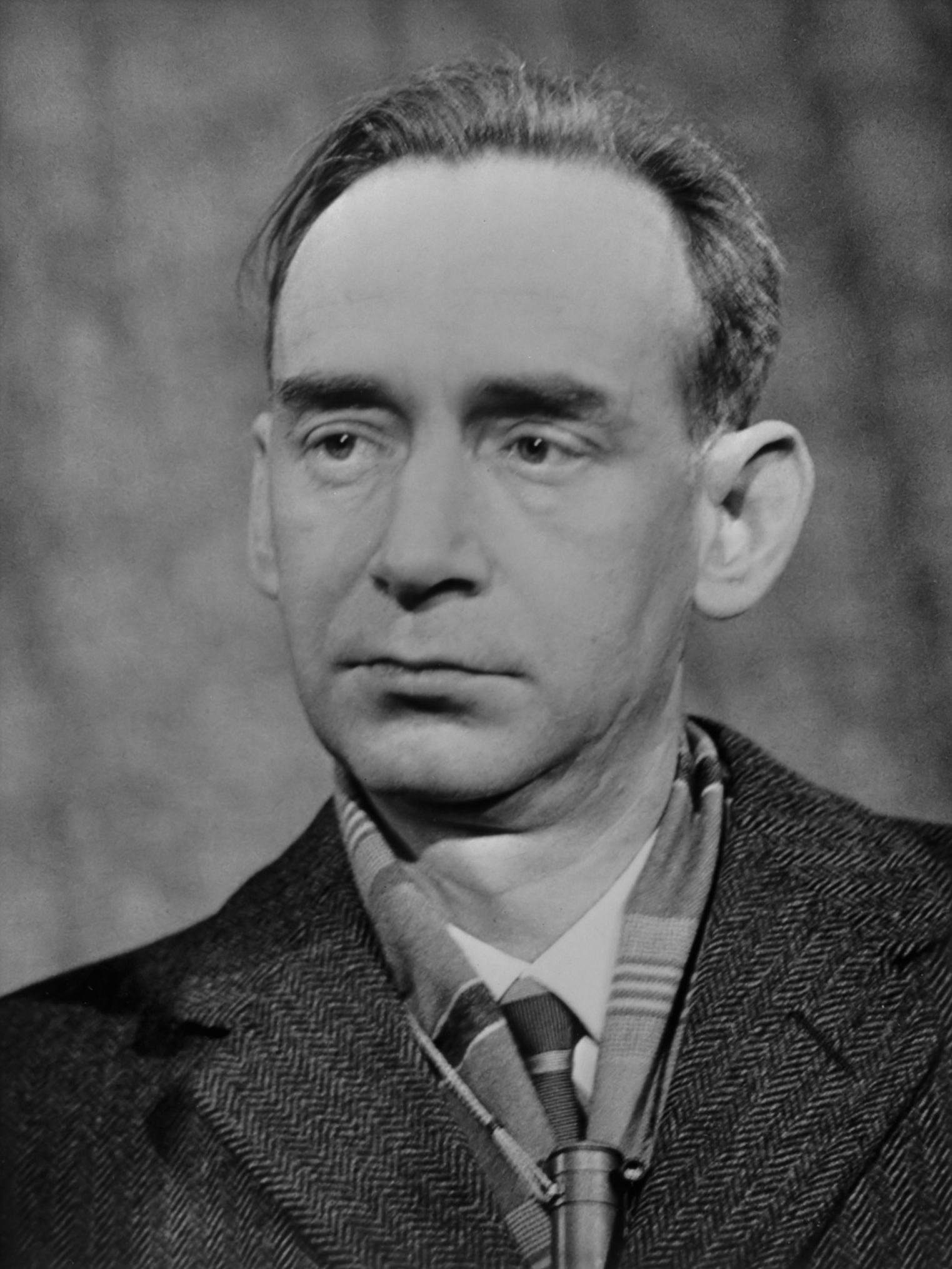
- Smirnovsky in 1971

Ambassador to the United Kingdom
- In office 25 January 1966 – 27 April 1973
- Preceded by: Aleksandr Soldatov
- Succeeded by: Nikolai Lunkov

Ambassador to Malta
- In office 30 October 1967 – 12 May 1973
- Preceded by: Position established
- Succeeded by: Nikolai Lunkov

Personal details
- Born: 7 August 1921
- Died: 9 June 1989 (aged 67) Moscow, Soviet Union
- Party: CPSU

Mikhail Nikolayevich Smirnovsky (Russian: Михаил Николаевич Смирновский; 7 August 1921 – 9 June 1989) was a Soviet diplomat and a specialist in Soviet relations with English-speaking countries. He was first secretary of the Soviet Embassy in Washington, D.C. in 1953, and served a second time in Washington as the minister-counselor and second-ranking officer of the Embassy at the beginning of the 1960s. Around 1963, Smirnovsky returned to the Foreign Ministry in Moscow, where he was chief of the USA section of the Ministry. In 1966, he became Soviet Ambassador to the United Kingdom (with concurrent accreditation in Malta starting in 1967), where he served until 1973. It is believed that he was later, in Moscow, a member of the Foreign Ministry's Collegium, understood to have been an advisory group of senior officers. He played in US-Soviet relations at critical times, including the Cuban Missile Crisis of 1962. Smirnovsky was viewed by American colleagues as an efficient, businesslike diplomat who, in contrast to many other Soviet officials, eschewed rudeness and avoided unnecessary exaggeration.
