= Krym Kazanokov =

Russian politician (born 1962)

- Крым Казаноков
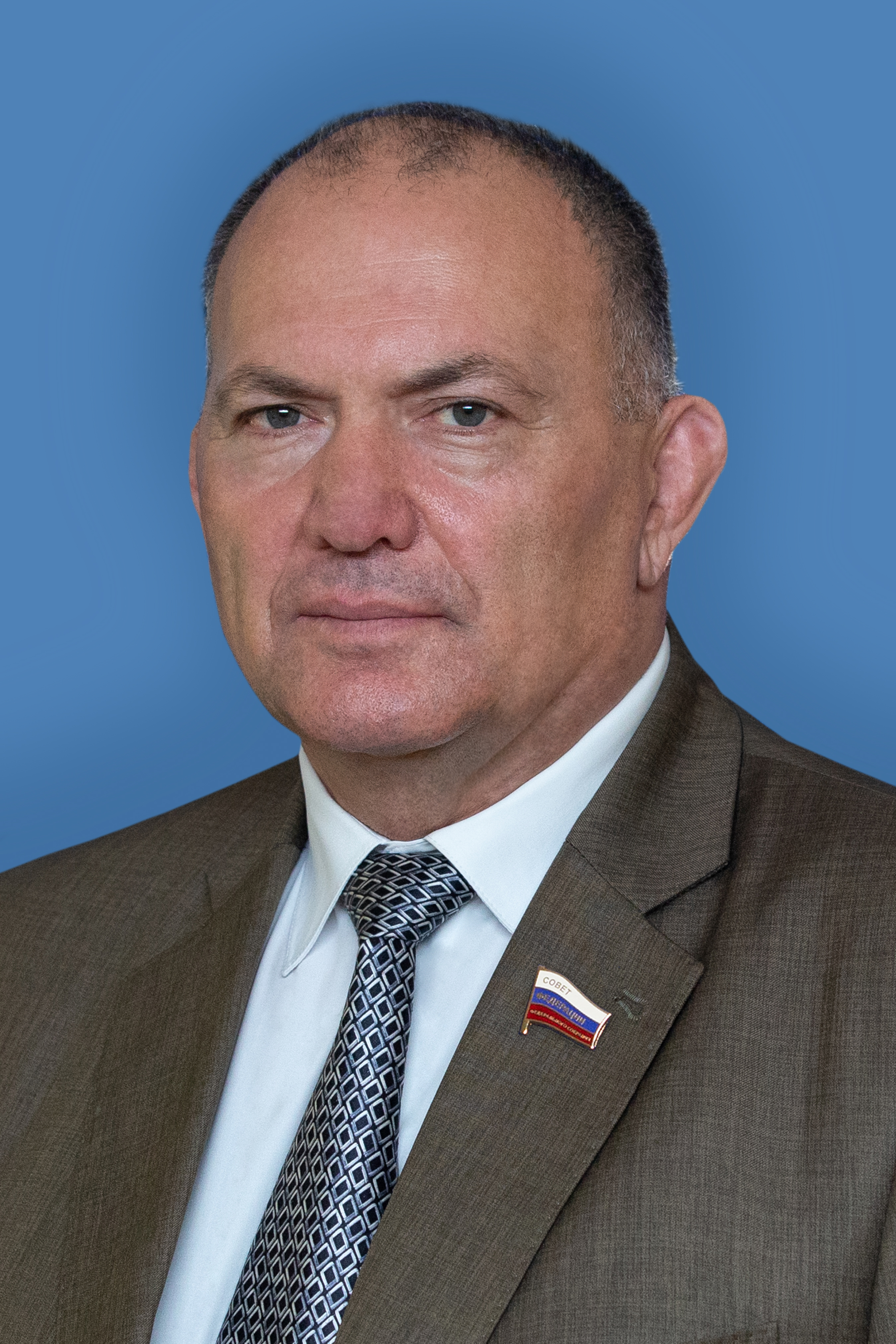

Russian Federation Senator from the Karachay-Cherkess Republic
- Incumbent
- Assumed office 25 June 2019
- Preceded by: Rauf Arashukov
- In office 5 February 2016 – 18 September 2016
- Preceded by: Vyacheslav Derev
- Succeeded by: Rauf Arashukov

Personal details
- Born: Krym Oliyevich Kazanokov; 19 July 1962 (age 64) Kosh-Khabl, Russia, Soviet Union
- Party: United Russia

Krym Oliyevich Kazanokov (Russian: Крым Олиевич Казаноков; born on 19 July 1962) is a Russian politician who is currently a member of the Federation Council from the executive authority of Karachay-Cherkessia since 2019, after he had already briefly served as a senator in 2016.

== Biography ==
Krym Kazanokov was born in the village of Kosh-Khabl of 19 July 1962.

He graduated from the Stavropol Polytechnic Institute with a degree in civil engineer and the North Caucasus Academy of Public Administration with a degree in state and municipal administration. He was a master of Sports of the Soviet Union in freestyle wrestling, and an honored Builder of the Karachay-Cherkess Republic.

Kazanokov was a member of the People's Assembly (Parliament) of the Karachay-Cherkess Republic of the fifth convocation, and was the chairman of the People's Assembly Committee on Industry, Transport, Construction, Communications and Energy.

On 5 February 2016, Kazanokov was sworn in with the powers of as a member of the Federation Council - a representative of the executive body of state power of Karachay-Cherkessia. In accordance with the unofficial agreement reached in 2011 on the distribution of posts on a national basis, the representative in the Federation Council from the government and the head of the government of Karachay-Cherkessia should be Circassian, as at the time of Kazanokov's appointment, the government was headed by his brother, Ruslan.

On 18 September 2016, Rauf Arashukov had replaced Kazanokov to become a new member of the Federation Council from the executive authority of Karachay-Cherkessia.

In 2017, with the support of United Russia, Kazanokov was elected to the Duma of the municipal formation of Cherkessk.

On 25 June 2019, the head of Karachay-Cherkessia, Rashid Temrezov, had appointed Kazanokov with the powers of a member of the Federation Council again in view of the arrest and removal of Arashukov.

On 19 September 2021, the re-elected head of the republic, Temrezov, reappointed Kazanokov as the senator from the executive body of state power in the region.

He was sanctioned by the UK government in 2022 in relation to the Russo-Ukrainian War.
