= Valentin Vlasov =

Russian diplomat and politician (1946–2020)

- Валентин Власов
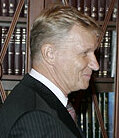
- Vlasov in 2006

Ambassador to Kyrgyzstan
- In office 6 December 2006 – 30 July 2012
- Preceded by: Yevgeny Shamgin
- Succeeded by: Andrey Krutko

Ambassador to Malta
- In office 5 August 2002 – 6 February 2006
- Preceded by: Sergey Zotov
- Succeeded by: Andrey Granvosky

Interim Head of Karachay-Cherkessia
- In office 24 July – 24 September 1999
- Preceded by: Vladimir Khubiyev; Igor Ivanov (acting)
- Succeeded by: Vladimir Semyonov

Governor of Arkhangelsk Oblast (acting)
- In office 21 February 1996 – 4 March 1996
- Preceded by: Pavel Balakshin
- Succeeded by: Anatoly Yefremov

2nd Mayor of Arkhangelsk
- In office 6 July 1993 – 20 April 1994
- Preceded by: Anatoly Bronnikov
- Succeeded by: Vladimir Gerasimov

Personal details
- Born: 20 August 1946 Arkhangelsk, RSFSR, Soviet Union
- Died: 5 July 2020 (aged 73) Moscow, Russia

Valentin Stepanovich Vlasov (Russian: Валентин Степанович Власов; 20 August 1946 — 5 July 2020) was a Russian diplomat and politician, who served as ambassador of Russia to Malta and Kyrgyzstan.

== Biography ==
Valentin Vlasov was born on 20 August 1946 in Arkhangelsk. He began his career in 1963 as a turner at the Krasnaya Kuznitsa plant. Then he served in the Soviet army. After demobilization, he worked as a turner in the Murmansk Shipping Company, a master of industrial training in the Arkhangelsk Regional Civil Defense Headquarters. Since 1974, he served as secretary of the Komsomol committee. In 1979, Vlasov was appointed head of the department of the Oktyabrsky district committee of the CPSU in Arkhangelsk. In 1980–83, he served as Deputy Chairman of the Executive Committee of the Oktyabrsky District Council. In 1985, Vlasov was sent to work in the Uzbek SSR. He was the second secretary of the Margilan city committee of the CPSU to 1986, and then the first secretary of the Quvasoy city committee in 1986–88; for the next two years he was an instructor in the department of the Central Committee of the Uzbekistani Communist Party.

In 1990 he returned to Arkhangelsk, having worked his way up to the mayor of Arkhangelsk and the head of the regional government. For two weeks in February–March 1996, after ousting of Pavel Balakshin, he was the interim governor of Arkhangelsk Oblast.

In 1996, Vlasov was appointed first deputy of Ivan Rybkin, then Plenipotentiary Representative of the Russian Government in Chechnya. Year later, Vlasov succeeded him in that position. On 1 May 1998, Vlasov was captured by a group of Chechen militants (presumably by the gang of Baudi Bakuyev) on the Rostov—Baku highway, near the village of Assinovskaya. Six months later, on November 13, Vlasov was released after the payment of $7 million in ransom.

In March 1999 the newly appointed head of the Central Election Commission of Russia Alexander Veshnyakov chosen Vlasov as one of his deputies. He was member of the commission until 2002. From July to September 1999, during the political crisis in Russia's North Caucasian autonomy of Karachay-Cherkessia, Vlasov served as the acting head of the region. Previous interim governor, speaker of the local legislature Igor Ivanov, failed to relief the conflict between the two candidates for the post, Karachay Vladimir Semyonov and Circassian Stanislav Derev. On 14 September 1999 Semyonov proclaimed himself president of Karachay-Cherkessia. On October 22, the Supreme Court of Russia recognized him as the elected head of the republic. At the same time Vlasov's "trip" to Cherkessk ended.

From August 2002 to February 2006 he was Ambassador Extraordinary and Plenipotentiary of Russia to Malta, and for the next six years Vlasov was ambassador to Kyrgyzstan. He died at the age of 73 on 5 July 2020. He was buried at the Troyekurovskoye Cemetery in Moscow.

== Awards ==
- Order "For Merit to the Fatherland" 2nd class (30 November 1998) — for merits in strengthening the Russian statehood, courage shown during the performance of the official duty
- Order of Holy Prince Daniel of Moscow 3rd class, Russian Orthodox Church (2011)
- Order of Honour (30 June 2012) — for a great contribution to the foreign policy of the Russian Federation and many years of conscientious work
- Danaker Order (Kyrgyzstan)

Diplomatic posts
| Preceded by Yevgeny Shmagin | Ambassador of Russia to Kyrgyzstan; 6 December 2006 – 30 July 2012 | Succeeded by Andrey Krutko |
| Preceded by Sergey Zotov | Ambassador of Russia to Malta; 5 August 2002 – 27 February 2006 | Succeeded by Andrey Granovsky |
