= Igor Ivanov (politician, born 1937) =

Russian politician

- Игорь Иванов
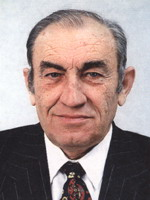

Head of Karachay-Cherkessia (acting)
- In office 25 May 1999 – 24 July 1999
- Preceded by: Vladimir Khubiyev
- Succeeded by: Valentin Vlasov (acting); Vladimir Semyonov

Member of the Federation Council - representative of the legislative body of state power of the Karachay-Cherkess Republic
- In office 23 January 1996 – 16 February 2000
- Succeeded by: Dzhanibek Suyunov

Chairman of the People's Assembly of Karachay-Cherkessia
- In office 23 June 1995 – 27 December 1999
- Succeeded by: Dzhanibek Suyunov

Personal details
- Born: Igor Vladimirovich Ivanov; 13 September 1937 Cherkessk, Russia, Soviet Union
- Died: 2000 (aged 62–63) Russia

Igor Vladimirovich Ivanov (Russian: Игорь Владимирович Иванов; 13 September 1937 – 2000) was a Russian politician who served as the acting Head of Karachay-Cherkess Republic in 1999. He had also served as a member of the Federation Council, and representative of the legislative authority of the Karachay-Cherkess Republic.

== Biography ==
Igor Ivanov was born on 13 September 1937 in Cherkessk. In 1959, he graduated from the North Ossetian Agricultural Institute with a degree in agronomist.

Until 1962, he worked as a teacher at the Adyge-Khabl secondary school, then until 1964, at the Karachay-Cherkess Institute for the Improvement of Teachers.

From 1964 to 1968, he was the First Secretary of the Circassian City Committee of the Komsomol, then worked in the Karachay-Cherkess Regional Committee of the Komsomol. Since 1971, he was in the Circassian City Committee of the CPSU,.

From 1984 to 1986, he served as the First Secretary of the Circassian City Committee of the CPSU. From 1988 to 1995, he worked as the director of the state enterprise "Department for the operation of the Great Stavropol Canal".

On 23 June 1995, Ivanov was elected chairman of the People's Assembly of the Karachay-Cherkess Republic.

On 23 January 1996, Ivanov was sworn in to represent Karachay-Cherkessia in the Federation Council. In February 1997, he was a member of the Committee on Social Policy, and from May 1997, he was promoted as the deputy chairman of the committee.

On 24 May 1999, at the height of the political crisis in the republic, Ivanov was appointed the acting head of Karachay-Cherkess Republic. He was officially replaced on 24 July, by Valentin Vlasov, as the acting head.

He died in 2000 at the time he left the Federation Council.
