= List of ambassadors of Russia to Malta =

Ambassador of the Russian Federation to the Republic of Malta
- Emblem of the Russian Foreign Ministry
- Incumbent; Andrei Lopukhov since 29 October 2021
- Ministry of Foreign Affairs; Embassy of Russia in San Ġwann
- Reports to: Minister of Foreign Affairs
- Seat: San Ġwann
- Appointer: President of Russia
- Term length: At the pleasure of the president
- Website: Embassy of Russia in Malta

The ambassador extraordinary and plenipotentiary of the Russian Federation to the Republic of Malta is the official representative of the president and the government of the Russian Federation to the president and the government of Malta.

The ambassador and his staff work at large in the Embassy of Russia in the town of San Ġwann, close to the capital of Valletta. The post of Russian ambassador to Malta is currently held by Andrei Lopukhov, incumbent since 29 October 2021.

== History of diplomatic relations ==
Diplomatic relations between the Soviet Union and Malta were established on 19 July 1967. Diplomatic relations were initially handled by the Soviet ambassador to the United Kingdom, who held concurrent accreditation as the ambassador to Malta. The first such ambassador was Mikhail Smirnovsky, who was appointed ambassador to Malta on 30 October 1967, and who presented his letter of credence on 10 November 1967. The State of Malta had declared independence in 1964, though it continued to be a Commonwealth realm until 1974, when it became an independent republic, while remaining within the Commonwealth. Relations continued to be through the Soviet embassy in London until the opening of an embassy in Malta on 1 July 1981. The first Soviet ambassador to be solely accredited to Malta was Viktor Smirnov, appointed on 22 October 1981. With the dissolution of the Soviet Union in 1991, the government of Malta recognized the Russian Federation in December 1991. The Soviet ambassador, Vladimir Plechko was replaced by Valentina Matviyenko as ambassador for Russia, and continued as representative of the Russian Federation until 1994.

== List of representatives (1967–present) ==
=== Soviet Union to the State of Malta (1967–1974) ===
Name	Title	Appointment	Termination	Notes
Mikhail Smirnovsky	Ambassador	30 October 1967	12 May 1973	Concurrently ambassador to the United Kingdom; Accredited from 10 November 1967
Nikolai Lunkov	Ambassador	12 May 1973	13 December 1974	Concurrently ambassador to the United Kingdom; Accredited from 8 February 1974

=== Soviet Union to the Republic of Malta (1974–1991) ===
Name	Title	Appointment	Termination	Notes
Nikolai Lunkov	Ambassador	13 December 1974	19 November 1980	Concurrently ambassador to the United Kingdom
Viktor Popov	Ambassador	19 November 1980	22 October 1981	Concurrently ambassador to the United Kingdom; Accredited from 24 March 1981
Viktor Smirnov	Ambassador	22 October 1981	10 September 1987	Accredited from 5 December 1981
Vladimir Plechko	Ambassador	10 September 1987	25 December 1991	

=== Russian Federation to Malta (1991–present) ===
Name	Title	Appointment	Termination	Notes
Valentina Matviyenko	Ambassador	25 December 1991	21 September 1994	
Yevgeny Mikhailov	Ambassador	21 September 1994	20 September 1996	
Viktor Isakov	Ambassador	20 September 1996	30 April 1999	
Sergey Zotov	Ambassador	30 April 1999	5 August 2002	
Valentin Vlasov	Ambassador	5 August 2002	27 February 2006	
Andrey Granovsky	Ambassador	27 February 2006	10 September 2010	
Boris Marchuk	Ambassador	10 September 2010	12 December 2014	
Vladimir Malygin	Ambassador	12 December 2014	29 October 2021	
Andrei Lopukhov	Ambassador	29 October 2021		
