= List of governors of Arkhangelsk Oblast =

Highest-ranking official in Arkhangelsk Oblast, Russia

Governor of Arkhangelsk Oblast
- Coat of arms of Arkhangelsk Oblast

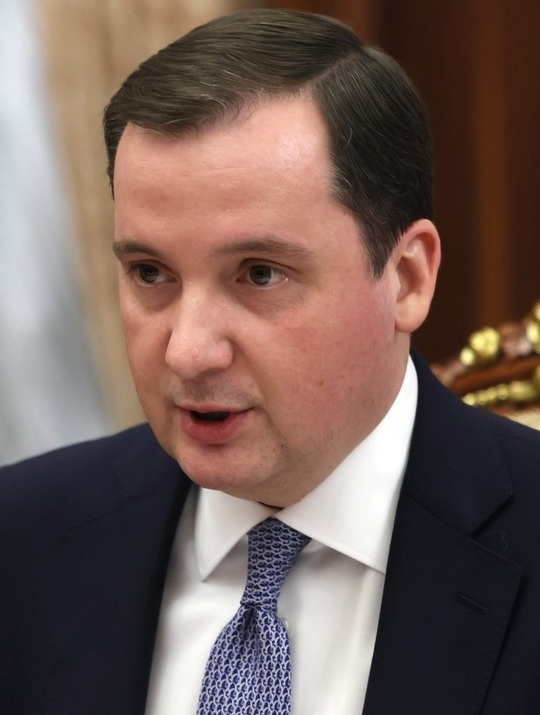
- Incumbent; Alexander Tsybulsky since 2 April 2020
- Residence: Arkhangelsk
- Term length: 5 years, renewable once
- Inaugural holder: Pavel Balakshin
- Formation: 1991
- Website: dvinaland.ru

The Governor of Arkhangelsk Oblast (Russian: Губернатор Архангельской области) is the head of Arkhangelsk Oblast, the federal subject of Russia. Governor is elected by the people for five years. The current governor is Alexander Tsybulsky.

== History of the office ==
Until 1991, the actual highest official of the region was the First Secretary of the Arkhangelsk Regional Committee of the Communist Party. The executive functions were carried out by the ispolkom (regional executive committee) formed by the regional council. The chairman of ispolkom was the nominal head of the region. In the spring of 1990, after the cancellation of Article 6 of the Soviet Constitution and free elections of local councils, the role of the regional council and ispolkom has significantly increased. In the Arkhangelsk region, the post of chairman of the regional council during this period was held by Pavel Balakshin, while Anatoly Gromoglasov was the first secretary of the CPSU regional committee.

After the August coup of 1991, executive committees of all levels began to be replaced by administrations. On 19 September 1991, Pavel Balakshin was appointed Head of Administration of Arkhangelsk Oblast.

== List ==
No.	Portrait	Governor	Tenure	Time in office	Party	Election
1		Pavel Balakshin (1936–2024)	19 September 1991 – 21 February 1996 (removed)	4 years, 155 days	Independent	Appointed
–		Valentin Vlasov (1946–2020)	21 February 1996 – 4 March 1996	12 days	Independent	Acting
2		Anatoly Yefremov (1952–2009)	4 March 1996 – 14 April 2004 (lost re-election)	8 years, 41 days	Independent → United Russia	Appointed 1996; 2000
3		Nikolay Kiselyov (born 1950)	14 April 2004 – 18 April 2008 (was not renominated)	4 years, 4 days	Independent	2004
4		Ilya Mikhalchuk (born 1957)	18 April 2008 – 13 January 2012 (resigned)	3 years, 270 days	United Russia	2008
–		Igor Orlov (born 1964)	13 January 2012 – 3 February 2012	8 years, 80 days	United Russia	Acting
5		Igor Orlov (born 1964)	3 February 2012 – 22 May 2015 (resigned)	8 years, 80 days	United Russia	2012
–		Igor Orlov (born 1964)	22 May 2015 – 24 September 2015	8 years, 80 days	United Russia	Acting
(5)		Igor Orlov (born 1964)	24 September 2015 – 2 April 2020 (resigned)	8 years, 80 days	United Russia	2015
–		Alexander Tsybulsky (born 1979)	2 April 2020 – 8 October 2020	6 years, 158 days	United Russia	Acting
6		Alexander Tsybulsky (born 1979)	8 October 2020 – present	6 years, 158 days	United Russia	2020; 2025

== Elections ==
=== 2020 ===
The latest election for the office was held on 13 September 2020.

Candidates	Party	Votes	%
Alexander Tsybulsky	United Russia	210,063	69.63%
Irina Chirkova	A Just Russia	51,046	16.92%
Sergey Pivkov	Liberal Democratic Party	20,386	6.76%
Andrey Yesipov	Communist Party of Social Justice	6,412	2.13%
Nikolay Vakorin	Party of Pensioners	5,356	1.78%
Ayman Tyukina	Green Alternative	3,750	1.24%

=== 2015 ===
Candidates	Party	Votes	%
Igor Orlov	United Russia	109,524	53.25
Olga Ositsyna	Liberal Democratic Party	39,519	19.22
Vasily Pavlov	Communist Party	23,834	11.59
Nadezhda Krayeva	A Just Russia	22,454	10.92
Vladimir Kertsev	Communists of Russia	5,830	2.83
