= Head of Karachay-Cherkessia =

Highest-ranking official in Karachay-Cherkessia, Russia

Head of the Karachay-Cherkess Republic
- Къэрэшей-Шэрджэс Республикэм и Тхьэмадэ (Kabardian); Къарачай-Черкес Республиканы Башчысы (Karachay-Balkar); Глава Карачаево-Черкесской Республики (Russian)
- Standard for the Head of the Republic

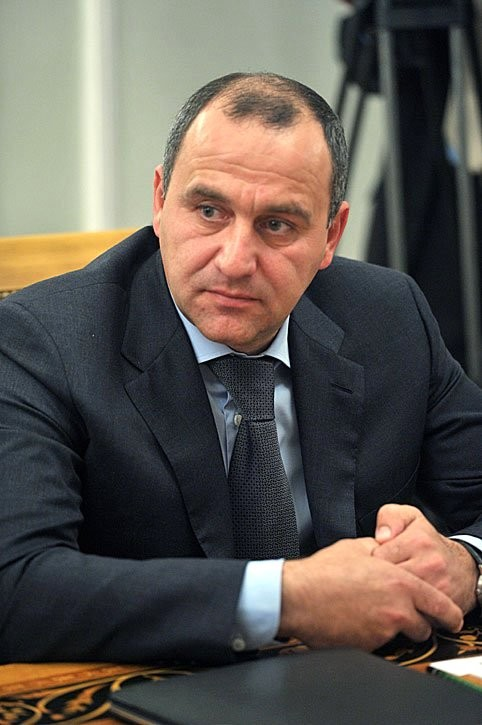
- Incumbent; Rashid Temrezov since 28 February 2011
- Executive branch of the Karachay-Cherkess Republic
- Style: His Excellency; The Honorable
- Type: Governor; Head of state; Head of government
- Seat: Cherkessk
- Nominator: President of Russia
- Appointer: People's Assembly
- Term length: 5 years, renewable
- Formation: 28 April 1995
- First holder: Vladimir Khubiyev
- Website: Official website

The position of the head of the Karachay-Cherkess Republic (Note: Russian: Глава Карачаево-Черкесской Республики, romanized: Glava Karachayevo-Cherkesskoy Respubliki; Kabardian: Къэрэшей-Шэрджэс Республикэм и Тхьэмадэ, romanized: Q̇ărăšej-Šărǯʹăs Respublikăm i Tḥămadă; Karachay-Balkar: Къарачай-Черкес Республиканы Башчысы, romanized: Qaraçay-Çerkes Respublikanı Başçısı) (formerly known as the president of the Karachay-Cherkess Republic) is the highest office within the Government of the Karachay-Cherkess Republic in Russia. The Head is elected by citizens of Russia residing in the republic. Term of service is five years.

== History ==
After the restoration of the Karachay-Cherkess Autonomous Oblast in 1957 as part of the Stavropol Krai and until the spring of 1990, the Karachay-Cherkess Regional Committee of the CPSU played a leading role in its leadership. From 1988 to July 1991, Valentin Lesnichenko was the first secretary of the regional committee.

In March 1990 there was a sharp decline of the one-party system connected with the abolition of the Article 6 of the Soviet Constitution, which defined the "leading and guiding role" of the Communist Party in USSR politics. Since that time Russian regions began to act as the de facto parliamentary republics. As a result, the head of the regional Council (soviet) became the major official in the region. Since March 1979, Vladimir Khubiev has been the chairman of the Executive committee of the Council of People's Deputies of the Karachay-Cherkessia.

On 22 March 1990, Lesnichenko was uncontestedly elected Speaker of the Council of People's Deputies, the new composition of which was elected in March 1990. On the same day, Vladimir Khubiyev was re-elected chairman of the Executive committee.

On 3 December 1991, the Council adopted a decision to re-establish the separate Karachay Republic. However, on December 5, the session of the Council decided to conduct a plebiscite on the preservation of the unity of Karachay-Cherkessia. On 13 January 1992, Russian president Boris Yeltsin appointed Khubiyev Acting Head of Administration of Karachay-Cherkessia. In January 1993, the former regional Council was transformed into the Supreme Soviet and the Council of Ministers was created with Khubiev as chairman. As a result, the region was headed by Vladimir Khubiyev for almost 20 years, from 1979 to 1999.

In April–May 1999, the first presidential elections in Karachay-Cherkessia were held. In the second round, the former commander-in-chief of the Ground Forces, Vladimir Semyonov, was elected. He received 75% of the votes against Stanislav Derev's 18%, but the opposition did not recognize the results and challenged them in courts for six months.

== List of officeholders ==
No.	Portrait	Name (born–died)	Term of office			Political party	Election	Ref.
No.	Portrait	Name (born–died)	Took office	Left office	Time in office	Political party	Election	Ref.
Head of Administration of the Karachay-Cherkess Republic
1		Vladimir Khubiyev (1932–2004)	13 January 1992	28 April 1995	3 years, 105 days	Independent	– (Note: Appointed by the president of Russia with the consent of the Supreme Soviet of Karachay-Cherkessia.)	
Head of the Karachay-Cherkess Republic
1		Vladimir Khubiyev (1932–2004)	28 April 1995	24 May 1999	4 years, 26 days	Independent	– (Note: Appointed by the president of Russia with the consent of the People's Assembly.)	
–		Igor Ivanov (1937–2000)	24 May 1999	24 July 1999	61 days	Independent	– (Note: Appointed acting head of the republic by the president of Russia.)	
–		Valentin Vlasov (1946–2020)	24 July 1999	24 September 1999 (Note: On 14 September 1999, president-elect Vladimir Semyonov was sworn in at a ceremony held in Ust-Dzheguta, although the outcome of the May 1999 election was still contested at that moment. The federal government recognized Semyonov's victory on 24 September, withdrawing its interim head of the republic Valentin Vlasov.)	62 days	Independent	–	
2		Vladimir Semyonov (born 1940)	14 September 1999	25 August 2000	346 days	Independent	1999	
President of the Karachay-Cherkess Republic
2		Vladimir Semyonov (born 1940)	25 August 2000	4 September 2003	3 years, 10 days	Independent	–	
3		Mustafa Batdyyev (born 1950)	4 September 2003	4 September 2008	5 years, 0 days	Independent	2003	
4		Boris Ebzeyev (1950–2026)	4 September 2008	28 February 2011	2 years, 177 days	Independent	2008	
5		Rashid Temrezov (born 1976)	1 March 2011	7 April 2011	37 days	United Russia	2011	
Head of the Karachay-Cherkess Republic
5		Rashid Temrezov (born 1976)	7 April 2011	27 February 2016	4 years, 326 days	United Russia	—	
–		Rashid Temrezov (born 1976)	27 February 2016	18 September 2016	204 days	United Russia	–	
5		Rashid Temrezov (born 1976)	18 September 2016	Incumbent	10 years, 58 days	United Russia	2016 (Note: Elected by the People's Assembly.); 2021; 2026	
