= Nikolay Kiselyov (politician) =

Russian politician

- Николай Киселёв
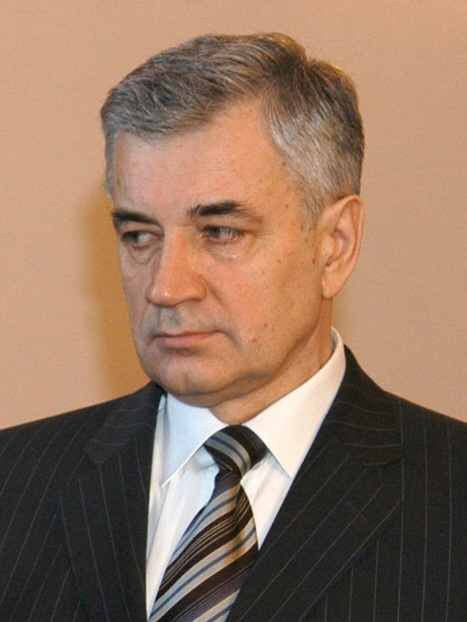
- Kiselyov in 2005

3rd Governor of Arkhangelsk Oblast
- In office 14 April 2004 – 14 April 2008
- Preceded by: Anatoly Yefremov
- Succeeded by: Ilya Mikhalchuk

Personal details
- Born: 21 December 1950 (age 75) Molotovsk, Arkhangelsk Oblast, RSFSR, Soviet Union

Nikolay Ivanovich Kiselyov (Russian: Николай Иванович Киселёв) is a Russian politician who was the governor of Arkhangelsk Oblast from 2004 to 2008.

He was born in Severodvinsk in 1950. In 1974 he graduated from a technical institute at Sevmash with an electrical engineer qualification. He worked in Severodvinsk at the Northern Production Association "Arktika", at the "Polyarnaya Zvezda" plant. Kiselyov is married and has two daughters.

In 2004 Kiselyov won the gubernatorial election in Arkhangelsk Oblast. Director of Arkhangelsk dairy factory, he was seemed as a dark horse candidate. Kiselyov's campaign was funded by various industrial enterprises and entities hostile to governor Yefremov (Lukoil, Solombala and Arkhangelsk Paper Mills etc.) He gained 45% of the vote in the 1st round and 75% in the runoff.

In July 2007, a footage of governor taking a bribe appeared on the Internet. It was perceived as a part of a conflict between Kiselyov and Alexander Donskoy, mayor of Arkhangelsk. Kiselyov refused to resign from office and finished his four-year term in April 2008. He was succeeded by Ilya Mikhalchuk.
