= Ilya Mikhalchuk =

Russian politician

- Илья Михальчук
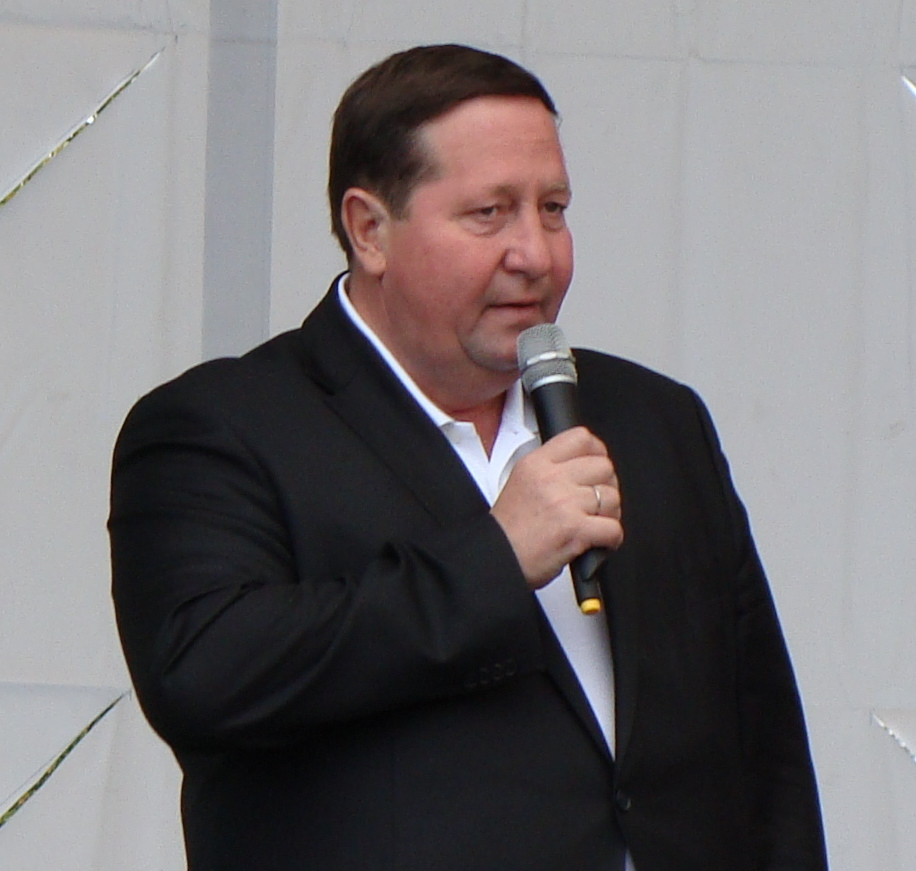
- Mikhalchuk in 2009

4th Governor of Arkhangelsk Oblast
- In office April 18, 2008 – January 13, 2012
- Preceded by: Nikolay Kiselyov
- Succeeded by: Igor Orlov

3rd Mayor of Yakutsk
- In office 11 January 1998 – 10 September 2007
- Preceded by: Spartak Borisov
- Succeeded by: Yury Zabolev

Personal details
- Born: 7 January 1957 (age 69) Kuybyshev, RSFSR, USSR
- Party: United Russia
- Profession: Candidate of Sciences

Ilya Filippovich Mikhalchuk (Russian: Илья Филиппович Михальчук; born 2 January 1957) is a former Russian politician, Head of the East-Siberian Construction Company representing the interests of the SU-155 Group of companies in Siberia.

From 2008 to 2012, he was Governor of Arkhangelsk Oblast; from 1998 to 2007, Mayor of Yakutsk.

== Early life and education ==
Born on January 2, 1957, in Kuibyshev, in 1977, he graduated from the Riga Aviation Technical School.

== Career ==
From 1977 to 1986, he made his career in the Komsomol (the All-Union Leninist Young Communist League). From 1986, he was a director of the Yakutsk CPSU publishing; since 1993, he headed the Department of Press of the government of Sakha (Yakutia) Republic.

From 1998 to September 2007, he was an elected mayor of Yakutsk. He left the city under the pressure of political opponents.

From 2002 to 2007, he was a member of the leadership of the Yakutsk branch of the United Russia Party.

In March 2008, on the proposal of President Vladimir Putin, the Arkhangelsk regional parliament approved Ilya Mikhalchuk as Governor of Arkhangelsk Oblast.

On 13 January 2012 Ilya Mikhalchuk resigned as Governor of Arkhangelsk Oblast.

In 2013 he became a deputy general director of the SU-155 Group parent company and headed the East-Siberian Construction Company. The East-Siberian Construction Company builds housing in Omsk, plans to construct housing in Novosibirsk and Krasnoyarsk, as well as the plant of reinforced concrete products in Iskitim.

== Curiosities ==
In 2011, a temporary namesake of Mikhalchuk Ilya Philippovich, a conservationist, leader of the "Plant your tree" movement and Arkhangelsk freak, who thought he was a tree, planned to go for Mayor of Yakutsk. The name "Ilya Philippoich Mikhalchuk" is one of dozens, for which he officially received a new passport.

== Family ==
Married, he has two sons. Both sons have studied in Switzerland and the United States.
