= Igor Orlov (politician) =

Russian statesman and politician

- Игорь Орлов
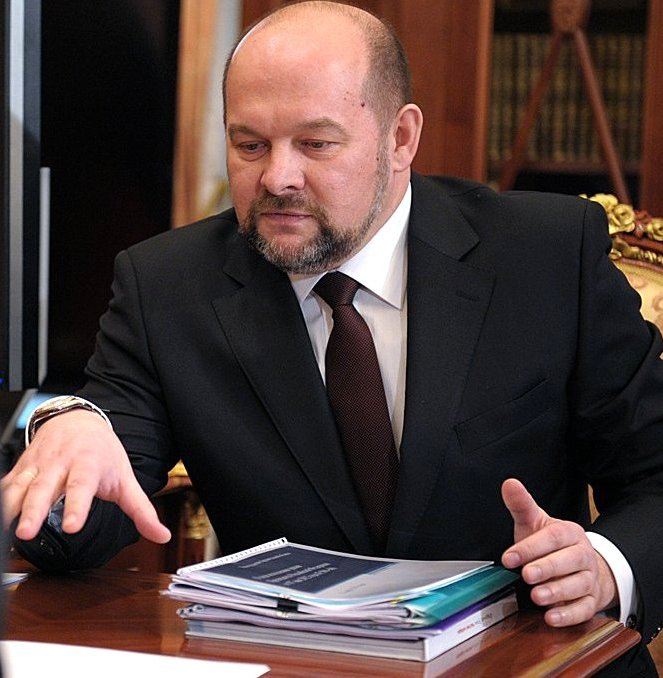
- Orlov in 2014

Governor of Arkhangelsk Oblast
- In office 3 February 2012 – 2 April 2020
- Preceded by: Ilya Mikhalchuk
- Succeeded by: Alexander Tsybulsky

Governor of Arkhangelsk Oblast (acting)
- In office 13 January 2012 – 3 February 2012
- Preceded by: Ilya Mikhalchuk
- Succeeded by: Himself (elected)

Personal details
- Born: Igor Anatolyevich Orlov; 17 August 1964 (age 62) Debaltseve, Ukrainian SSR, Soviet Union
- Party: United Russia
- Spouse: Tatyana Pavlovna Orlova
- Children: Gleb, Daria
- Education: Saint Petersburg State Marine Technical University
- Profession: Engineer, politician

Igor Anatolyevich Orlov (Russian: Игорь Анатольевич Орлов; born 17 August 1964) is a Russian politician and engineer who served as the governor of Arkhangelsk Oblast from 2012 to 2020. He resigned amid the 2018–2020 Shies protests, which opposed the construction of a landfill in the region.

Since June 2020, Orlov has been serving as the General Director of PJSC Severnaya Verf Shipyard.

Orlov was also a member of the Presidium of the Regional Political Council of the Arkhangelsk branch of the United Russia party.

== Biography ==
Igor Orlov was born in Debaltseve, Ukraine, on 17 August 1964. He attended high school in his hometown. His father, Anatoliy Orlov, headed the Debaltseve Transport Department of the Party Committee and later the transport department of Uglegorsk TPP.

In 1987, he graduated from the Leningrad Institute of Aviation Instrumentation (now part of Saint Petersburg State University of Aerospace Instrumentation), earning a degree in electrical equipment of aircraft and qualifying as an electrical engineer.

That same year, Orlov began working at Zvyozdochka, one of the largest military ship repair and shipbuilding enterprises in Severodvinsk. He started as an electrician specializing in the repair of electrical equipment.

From 1988 to 1991, he served as a process engineer and later as head of the sector at the Onega Design and Technology Bureau in Severodvinsk. In 1991, he was promoted to chief technologist.

From 1994 to 2008, Orlov worked at the FSUE "Zvyozdochka" Ship Repair Center. He initially led the Automated Production Control Systems Department (OASUP). In 1997, he was appointed Deputy General Director and Head of Department. By 2003, he had become Deputy General Director and Head of the Department for Economics, Development, Pricing, and Finance. In 2004, he was promoted to Deputy General Director for Economics and Foreign Economic Activity.

In 2008, Orlov moved to Kaliningrad, where he became Deputy General Director of JSC "Baltic Shipbuilding Plant" Yantar. He later served as acting General Director before being officially appointed General Director. He held this position until 30 June 2011.

On 10 August 2011, he became First Deputy Executive Director for Production at Avtotor Holding LLC, a car assembly plant in Kaliningrad. Additionally, he served as chairman of the Kaliningrad branch of the public organization "Union of Mechanical Engineers of Russia".

=== Governor of Arkhangelsk Oblast ===
On 13 January 2012, Russian President Dmitry Medvedev accepted the resignation of the Governor of Arkhangelsk Oblast, Ilya Mikhalchuk, and appointed Igor Orlov as the Acting Governor. The publication Delovoy Peterburg noted that Orlov's appointment was unexpected.

On 31 January 2012, President Medvedev proposed to the Arkhangelsk Regional Assembly of Deputies that Igor Orlov be granted the powers of governor. On 3 February 2012, the deputies approved Orlov as the governor of Arkhangelsk Oblast for a five-year term.

Orlov's term was set to expire in February 2017; however, in May 2015, he resigned ahead of schedule and simultaneously requested permission from President Vladimir Putin to run for re-election. This request was necessary because, under normal circumstances, the law prohibits an early resignation followed by an immediate candidacy. Putin granted permission and appointed Orlov as Acting Governor until the election. The gubernatorial election took place on 13 September 2015, where Orlov won in the first round with 53.25% of the votes. He was inaugurated on 24 September 2015.

From 25 October 2014 to 7 April 2015, Orlov was a member of the Presidium of the State Council of Russia.

In November 2015, Orlov supported the introduction of the Platon toll system and criticized the truck drivers' protests against it, calling them "brainless."

On 8 July 2019, RBC reported that Orlov might be dismissed as part of an upcoming staff rotation. Orlov denied these claims.

On 12 November 2019, during a conference of the regional branch of the United Russia party, Orlov announced his intention to run for re-election as governor in 2020, despite his declining popularity in various polls and ratings. He also stated that he expected to win the election in the first round. However, the leader of the Arkhangelsk regional branch of the Communist Party, Aleksander Novikov, described Orlov's decision to run as "desperate."

On 2 April 2020, Orlov resigned as governor. He was replaced by Alexander Tsybulsky, who had previously served as the governor of the Nenets Autonomous Okrug. Orlov stated that his decision to resign was based on the results of "large sociological research conducted by a number of professional companies."

=== Criticism ===
In 2018, Igor Orlov supported the construction of Ecotechnopark, which was widely criticized as an illegal landfill at Shies station. Up to 10 billion rubles were planned to be allocated from the Moscow budget for the project. The media and several social activists claimed that Orlov’s actions created a dangerous situation in Arkhangelsk Oblast and the neighboring Komi Republic.

On April 5, 2019, during a meeting with trade union leaders in Severodvinsk, Orlov referred to his critics as "all sorts of huskies" and stated that he was "not a fool to give up billions." His remarks provoked widespread backlash, leading to criticism and calls for his resignation.

On April 7, 2019, thousands of people took part in unauthorized demonstrations in Arkhangelsk against the landfill project in Shies. Protesters also demanded the adoption of a law banning the import of garbage from other regions and called for Orlov’s resignation. The demonstrators occupied Troitsky Avenue, stretching from the Marine River Station to Lenin Square. Interior Ministry officials attempted to block the march by forming several lines, but protesters pushed through. Some observers suggested that law enforcement officers deliberately avoided escalating the confrontation, as they behaved non-aggressively, smiled, and even expressed solidarity with the demonstrators. After regrouping in Lenin Square, the National Guard and the Ministry of Internal Affairs refrained from using force against the protesters.

During the protest, organizers announced an indefinite demonstration under the banner of EcoFinality, setting up tents in the center of the square. One of the key symbols of the protest was a banner reading, “You will answer for the husk.”

On June 7, 2019, a scarecrow resembling Orlov, with the inscription “I sold the North,” was found hanging from wires near the City Administration over Voskresensky Avenue. To remove it, authorities temporarily blocked traffic and deployed emergency services.

On June 20, 2019, following a televised Q&A session with Vladimir Putin, activists organized a public gathering in Lenin Square to express their dissatisfaction with Putin’s response regarding the landfill's legality. At the demonstration, EcoBendingless participants brought a wooden toilet, referencing Orlov’s repeated statements about his unwillingness to “hang in the toilet” over his declining approval ratings.

At the peak of the protests, at least 30 activists maintained a presence at EcoBeach from 7:00 AM to 10:00 PM daily. Over time, the duration of the demonstrations gradually decreased. After Orlov's resignation, the Eco-Perpetual protest in Lenin Square effectively ended on April 7, 2020. Reflective vests and the flag of Urdoma MO became symbols of the EcoUnlimited movement. During the short April days, the vests became especially popular. Some bloggers compared EcoUnlimited to the Yellow Vests movement in France, but activists rejected this comparison, emphasizing that their protest was local in nature and not connected to foreign opposition movements. They also maintained a strictly patriotic stance regarding the region’s interests.

Shortly before the televised Q&A session, during the celebration of Russia Day, demonstrators attended a rally-concert where Orlov delivered a speech. His address was met with boos from people wearing reflective vests. However, the protest remained peaceful, with no violence reported. Orlov later approached the demonstrators for a photo. Protest organizers considered the photo significant, as regional media had previously portrayed Shies activists—dubbed “defenders of the North”—as extremists and fringe elements. The image with Orlov contradicted this portrayal, suggesting that the activists were not as aggressive as previously depicted. On social media, Orlov commented on the photo, describing it as an example of his willingness to engage in dialogue with the protesters.

== Role at Severnaya Verf ==
In June 2020, Igor Orlov was appointed as the temporary General Director of PJSC Shipbuilding Plant Severnaya Verf, later becoming its official General Director.

Orlov’s appointment to the head of a shipbuilding enterprise was not unexpected, given his long-standing ties to the industry. His career began at the Zvezdochka enterprise in Severodvinsk, where he became acquainted with Leonid Strugov, the current Vice President of the United Shipbuilding Corporation (USC). Both Orlov and Strugov started their careers as electricians at the plant before transitioning into economic and managerial roles.

In the early 1990s, Strugov served as Deputy Director for Economics at the Polyarnaya Zvezda plant before moving into private business alongside the future governor of Arkhangelsk Oblast, Nikolai Kiselev. Over the years, as Orlov advanced to leadership positions in the Arkhangelsk regional administration and later became governor, he maintained professional ties with Strugov, who had by then moved on to lead the Department of Shipbuilding Industry and Marine Technology at the Ministry of Industry and Trade before joining USC.

The pattern of appointing shipbuilding industry professionals to key administrative roles extended beyond Orlov and Strugov. Many figures with backgrounds in Severodvinsk’s shipbuilding sector held influential positions at both regional and national levels. These include former Deputy Mayor of Severodvinsk Oleg Davidenko, who worked alongside Orlov at NIPTB Onega; former Mayor of Severodvinsk Mikhail Gmyrin; and Sergey Tyshov, the former head of the city's tax department, who had prior experience at Zvezdochka. Additionally, Vyacheslav Pospelov, a board member of the Russian Military-Industrial Commission, and other shipbuilding executives played significant roles in shaping the industry’s leadership landscape.

== Family ==
Igor Orlov's wife, Tatyana Pavlovna Orlova, is the head of the Good World charity foundation.

Their son, Gleb Orlov (born 1997), is a football player for FC Northern Dvina and serves as the captain of the regional youth football team.

Their eldest daughter, Daria, has two children, Demid and Danil.

== Personal life ==
Orlov's hobbies include sports, theater, and charity work. He has played football since childhood and continues to do so. He regularly participates in friendly matches and plays for the regional government’s team.
