= Oleg Budargin =

Russian politician

- Олег Бударгин
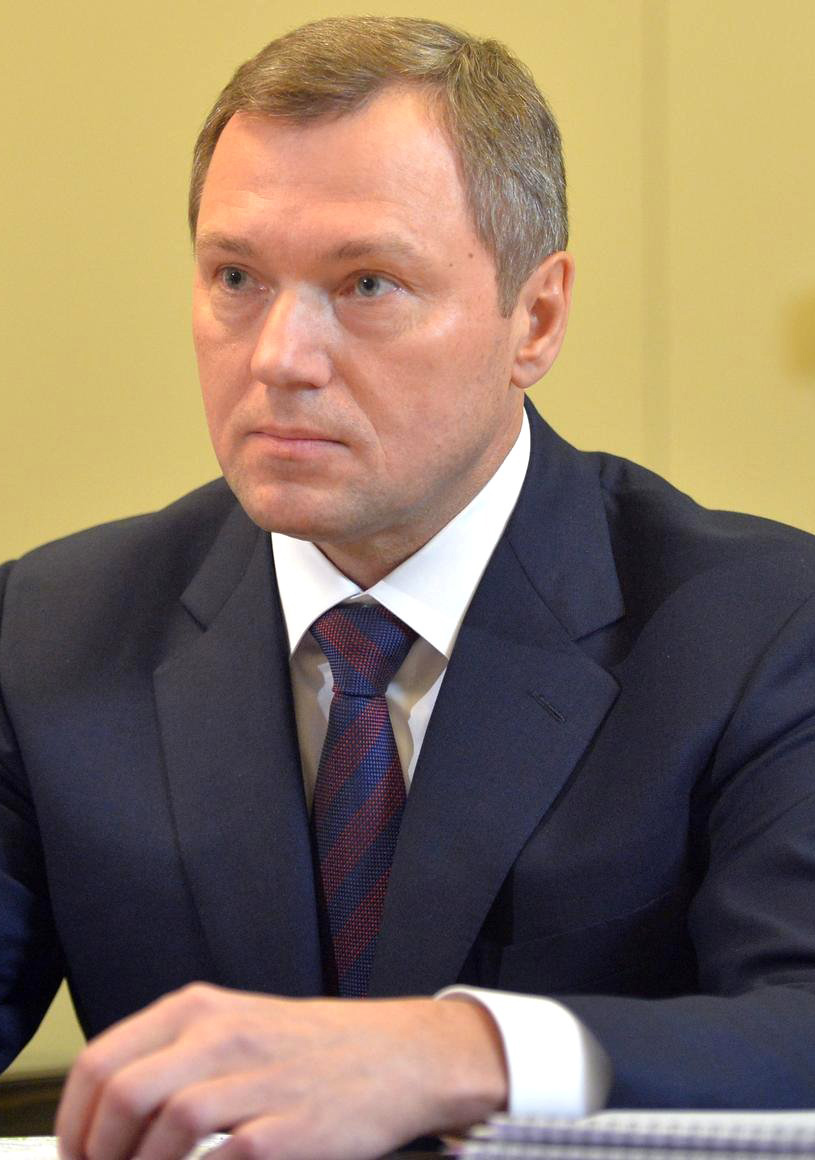
- Budargin in 2015

3rd Governor of Taimyr Autonomous Okrug
- In office 26 January 2003 – 31 December 2006
- Preceded by: Alexander Khloponin
- Succeeded by: position abolished

Head of Norilsk
- In office 10 December 2000 – 5 February 2003
- Preceded by: Yury Malanin (acting)
- Succeeded by: Gennady Petukhov (acting)

Head of Norilsk (acting)
- In office 15 March 2000 – 10 December 2000

Personal details
- Born: Oleg Mikhailovich Budargin; 16 November 1960 Klyuchi, RSFSR, Soviet Union
- Party: United Russia
- Children: 1 son

Oleg Mikhaylovich Budargin (Russian: Олег Михайлович Бударгин; born November 16, 1960) was the governor of Taymyr Autonomous Okrug in Russia. He took office in February 2003 after having won elections the previous month with 70% of the vote. He was previously the mayor of Norilsk.

Budargin's term ended when Taymyr Autonomous Okrug was merged into Krasnoyarsk Krai on January 1, 2007.
