= Alexander Khloponin =

Russian politician

- Александр Хлопонин
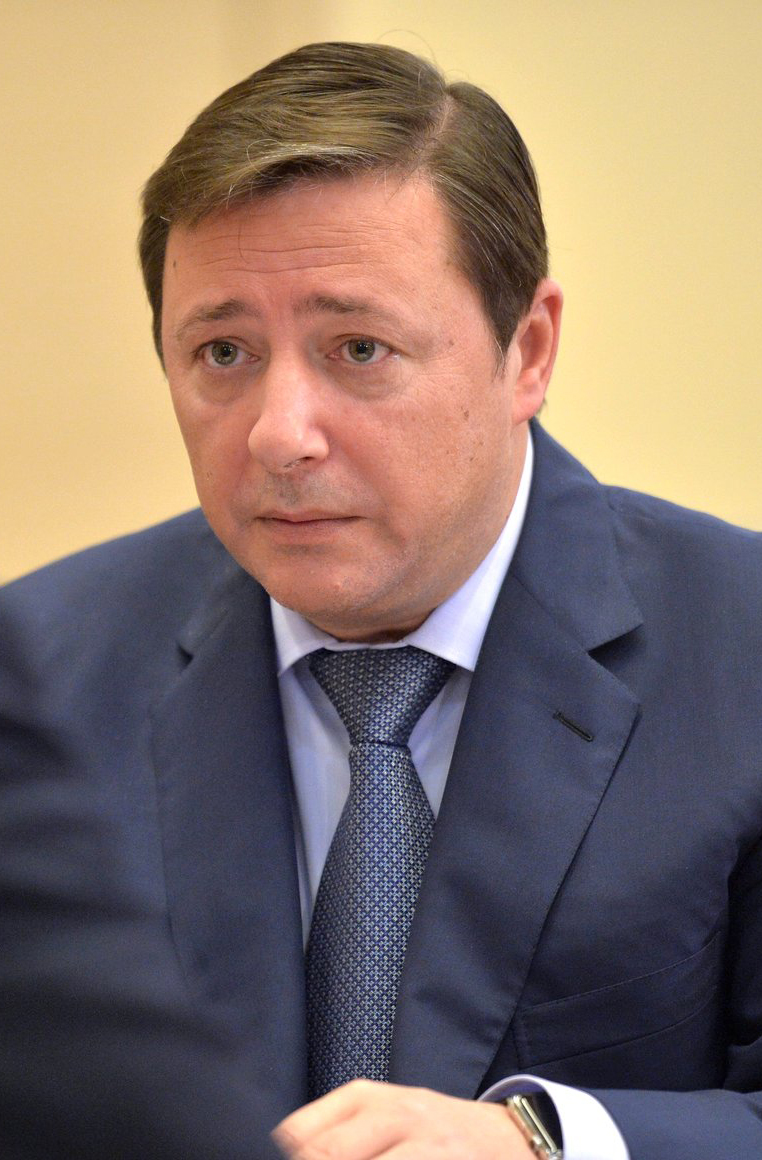
- Khloponin in 2015

Deputy Prime Minister
- In office 19 January 2010 – 7 May 2018
- Prime Minister: Vladimir Putin; Dmitry Medvedev

Presidential Envoy to the North Caucasian Federal District
- In office 19 January 2010 – 12 May 2014
- President: Dmitry Medvedev; Vladimir Putin
- Preceded by: Office established
- Succeeded by: Sergey Melikov

4th Governor of Krasnoyarsk Krai
- In office 17 October 2002 – 19 January 2010
- Preceded by: Alexander Lebed; Nikolay Ashlapov (acting)
- Succeeded by: Edkham Akbulatov (acting); Lev Kuznetsov

2nd Governor of Taymyr AO
- In office 21 February 2001 – 10 October 2002
- Preceded by: Gennady Nedelin
- Succeeded by: Oleg Budargin

Personal details
- Born: March 6, 1965 (age 61) Colombo, Dominion of Ceylon
- Party: United Russia
- Education: Moscow Financial Institute
- Profession: Politician, businessman

Alexander Gennadyevich Khloponin (Russian: Алекса́ндр Генна́дьевич Хлопо́нин; born March 6, 1965) is a Russian ex politician. Khloponin served as Governor of Krasnoyarsk Krai, a krai located in Siberia, from October 2002 to January 2010. From 2010 to 2018, Khlonopin served as Deputy Prime Minister of Russia. He was a member of United Russia.

== Background and education ==
Khloponin was born on March 6, 1965, in Colombo, Ceylon (now Sri Lanka). He received a finance degree from the Moscow Finance Institute. He later served as chairman of the board of the Norilsk Nickel company.

== Political career ==
In 2001, he became the governor of Taymyr Autonomous Okrug in northern Siberia, holding that position until 2002. Khloponin won the election for governor of Krasnoyarsk Krai against Alexander Uss, another man with major business links. The race was relatively close, with Khloponin winning only 48% of the vote even in the runoff.

Russian president Dmitry Medvedev in January 2010 ordered the establishment of the North Caucasian Federal District (from Southern Federal District) and appointed Khloponin Vice-Premier of the Russian Federation and Plenipotentiary Envoy of the President to the new federal district while relieving him of the governor's office. President Vladimir Putin on May 12 replaced Khloponin as envoy with the Interior Ministry Lt. Gen. Sergey Melikov.

== Personal life and recognition ==
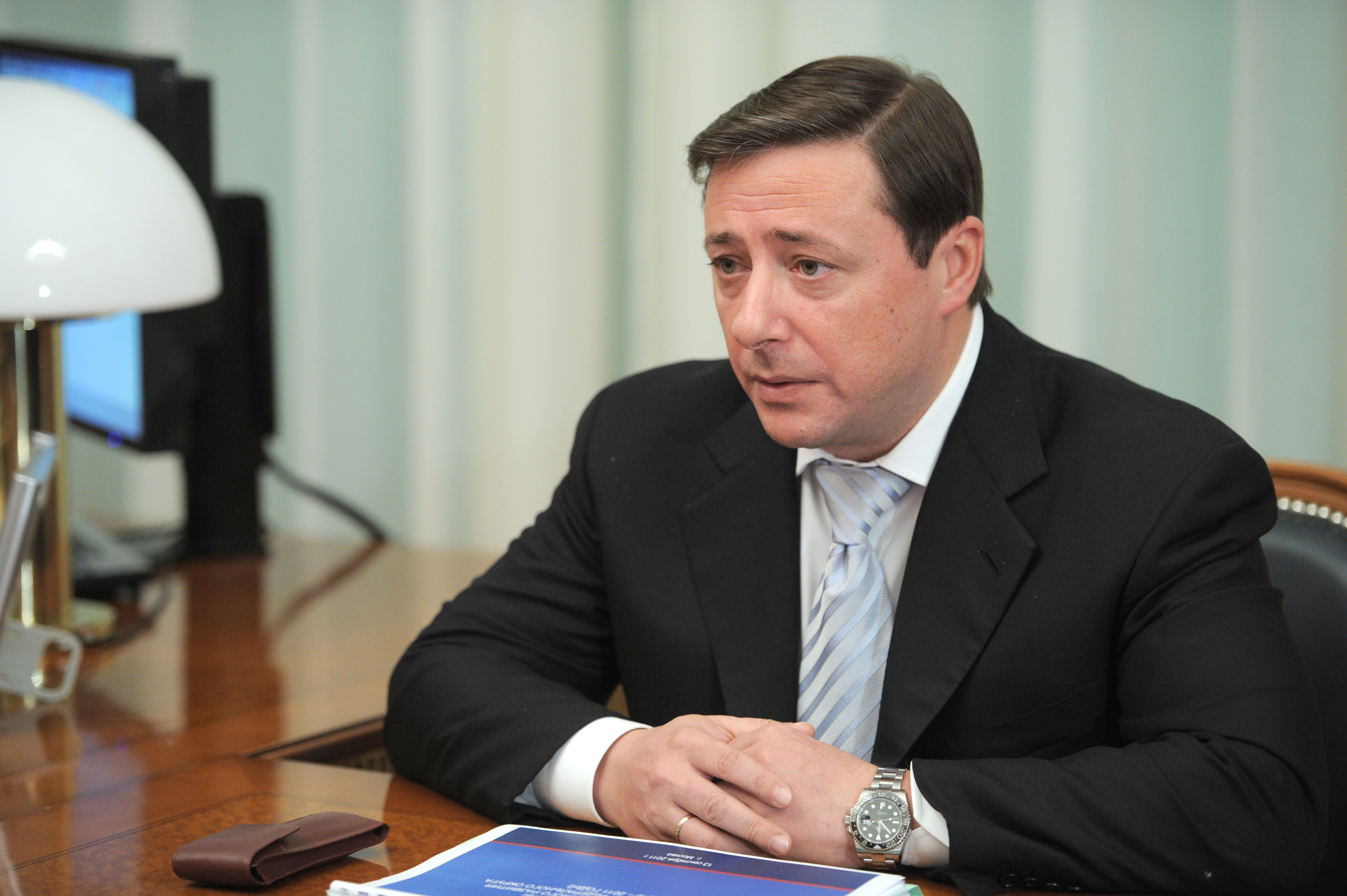
Khloponin in 2011

In 2002, Alexander Khloponin was named Person of the Year by Expert magazine, a Russian business weekly. Khloponin's daughter, Lyubov Khloponina, studied at the London School of Economics.
