= Mustafa Batdyyev =

President of Karachay–Cherkessia

- Мустафа Батдыев; Батдыланы Мустафа
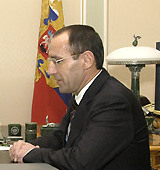
- Batdyyev in 2004.

2nd President of Karachay–Cherkessia
- In office 4 September 2003 – 4 September 2008
- Preceded by: Vladimir Magomedovich Semenov
- Succeeded by: Boris Ebzeyev

Personal details
- Born: December 24, 1950 (age 75) South Kazakhstan Province, Kazakh SSR, USSR
- Party: Non-Partisan
- Profession: Economist

Dr. Mustafa Azret-Aliyevich Batdyyev (Russian: Мустафа Азрет-Алиевич Батдыев; Karachay-Balkar: Батдыланы Азрет-Алийни джашы Мустафа, romanized: Batdılanı Azret-Aliyni caşı Mustafa) (born December 24, 1950) is a Russian politician of Karachay ethnicity, who was the second president of Karachay–Cherkessia, serving from 2003 to 2008.

== Biography ==
Batdyyev was born to an ethnic Karachay family in Kazakhstan; his family repatriated in 1957. Mustafa Batdyyev finished a boarding school in Cherkessk and served in the Soviet Army from 1970 to 1972. In 1978 he was graduated from the Faculty of Economics of Moscow State University and in 1981 he got his doctorate there. Batdyyev is married and has two children.

== Governmental career ==
After his studies, Batdyyev returned to Karachay–Cherkessia where from 1981 to 1986 he worked as an economist in the "Rodina" kolkhoz. From 1986 to 1992 he successfully headed the Economics Department of the Oblast Communist Committee. 1992 to 1997 Batdyyev worked in the Government of Karachay–Cherkessia dealing with economic affairs. In 1997 Batdyyev was appointed as a chairman of the National Bank of Karachay–Cherkessia which was recognized as the best in Russian Federation. On August 31, 2003, Batdyyev defeated the first president of Karachay–Cherkessia, Vladimir Magomedovich Semenov, in the presidential elections. In the summer of 2008, Batdyyev was replaced as president of Karachay–Cherkessia by Boris Ebzeyev, who was appointed by Russian Federation President Dmitry Medvedev.

Political offices
Preceded by Vladimir Semyonov	President of Karachay-Cherkessia; 2003-2008	Succeeded by Boris Ebzeyev
