= Anatoly Yefremov =

Russian politician

- Анатолий Ефремов
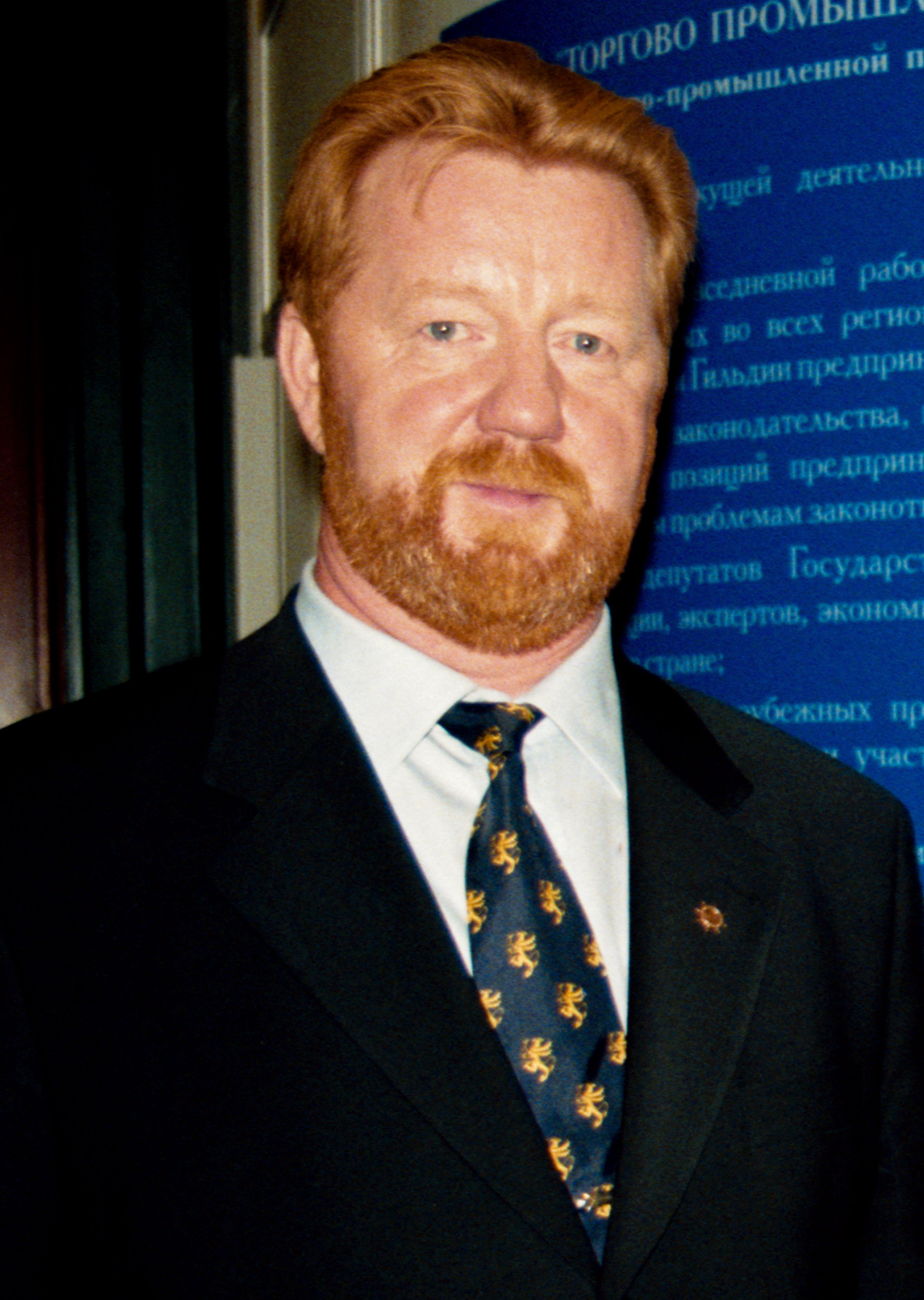
- Yefremov in 2002

2nd Governor of Arkhangelsk Oblast
- In office 4 March 1996 – 14 April 2004
- Preceded by: Valentin Vlasov (acting)
- Succeeded by: Nikolay Kiselyov

Personal details
- Born: Anatoly Antonovich Yefremov; 30 January 1952 Maloye Toynokurye, Russian SFSR, Soviet Union
- Died: 13 October 2009 (aged 57) Arkhangelsk, Russia
- Party: Our Home - Russia

Anatoly Antonovich Yefremov (Russian: Анатолий Антонович Ефремов; 30 January 1952 – 13 October 2009), was a Russian politician who served as the 2nd Governor of Arkhangelsk Oblast from 1996 to 2004.

== Biography ==
Anatoly Yefremov was born in on 30 January 1952, in the village of Maloye Toinokurye, Primorsky District, Arkhangelsk Oblast, to his father, officer Anton Andreyevich (1913–1998) and his mother, Antonina Vasilyevna (1917–2001).

He graduated from the Arkhangelsk Forestry Engineering Institute with a degree in mechanical engineering of road transport in 1975, and from the Leningrad Higher Party School in 1986, candidate of economic sciences.

From 1975 to 1984, he was the head of the department, second secretary of the Lomonosov district committee of the Komsomol in Arkhangelsk, the deputy chief of staff of the shock construction of the Non-Chernozem zone of the USSR of the Arkhangelsk regional committee of the Komsomol, instructor of the Lomonosov district committee of the CPSU, then first secretary of the Nenets Autonomous Okrug committee of the Komsomol, and the second secretary of the Arkhangelsk regional committee of the Komsomol.

From 1984 to 1990, he then head of the Arkhangelsk Motor Transport Enterprise - 2, director of the Arkhangelsk Production Association of Freight Road Transport, director of the Arkhangelsk State Motor Transport Enterprise - 1.

From 1990 to 1991, he was the deputy chairman of the executive committee of the Arkhangelsk Regional Council. In November 1991, he became the Deputy Head of the Regional Socio-Economic Complex for Industry and Transport, then Deputy Head of the Administration of the Arkhangelsk Region - Chairman of the Committee for Industry, Transport, Communications and Road Construction. In 1994, he was the Deputy Head of the Regional Administration - Head of the Representative Office of the Arkhangelsk Region under the Government of Russia.

On 4 March 1996, Yefremov was appointed head of the Administration of the Arkhangelsk Region. In December 1996, he was elected head of the Administration of Arkhangelsk Oblast, defeating the former first secretary of the regional committee of the CPSU, Yury Guskov. From April 1996 to December 2001, he was a member of the Federation Council ex officio, was a member of the Federation Council Committee on International Affairs. On 17 December 2000, he was elected governor of the region for the second time, having won in the second round of elections over the former chairman of the regional government Nikolay Malakov.

From 19 December 2003 to 19 July 2004 - Member of the Presidium of the State Council of the Russian Federation.

In March 2004, he ran for the third time for the post of governor of Arkhangelsk Oblast. In the elections on 14 March, he won 26.55% of the votes, took second place among eight candidates and advanced to the second round together with Nikolay Kiselyov, the General Director of Moloko OJSC (44.86% of the votes). In the second round of elections on 28 March, he won 17.5% of the votes of the voters who took part in the voting, and lost the election to Kiselyov, who received the support of more than 75% of the voters.

He was a member of the Presidium of the Independent Organization "Civil Society" and the National Foundation "Public Recognition", a member of the Presidium of the National Civil Committee for Cooperation with Law Enforcement, Legislative and Judicial Bodies, a member of the Public Council of the "Vneshtorgclub".

Anatoly Antonovich Yefremov died on 14 October 2009, in Arkhangelsk at the age of 58 after a long illness from a brain tumor. On 16 October, after the funeral service in the church of his native village Toinokure, he was buried at the Kuznechevskoye cemetery in Arkhangelsk.

== Family ==
He was married and had two sons.
