= Boris Ebzeyev =

Russian politician and judge (1950–2026)

- Борис Эбзеев; Борис Эбзеланы
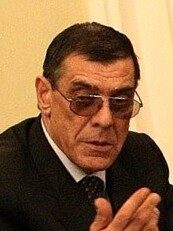
- Ebzeyev in 2010

Member of the Central Election Commission
- In office 14 March 2011 – 30 March 2026
- Appointed by: Federation Council

4th President of Karachay–Cherkessia
- In office 4 September 2008 – 28 February 2011
- Preceded by: Mustafa Batdyyev
- Succeeded by: Rashid Temrezov

Judge of the Constitutional Court of Russia
- In office 30 October 1991 – 4 September 2008
- Nominated by: Congress of People's Deputies of Russia

Personal details
- Born: 25 April 1950 Janga Jere, Frunze Region, Kyrgyz SSR, Soviet Union
- Died: 23 August 2026 (aged 76)
- Party: Independent
- Education: Saratov Institute of Law
- Profession: Judge

Boris Safarovich Ebzeyev (Russian: Борис Сафарович Эбзеев; Karachay-Balkar: Борис Сафарны джашы Эбзеланы, Boris Safarnı caşı Ebzelanı, 25 February 1950 – 23 August 2026) was a Russian politician and jurist who has served as judge of the Constitutional Court of Russia from 1991 to 2008, as president of Karachay–Cherkessia from 2008 to 2011, and as a member of the Central Election Commission from 2011 to 2026.

== Life and career ==
=== Early life and education ===
A Karachay, Ebzeyev was born in the village of Janga Jere, Frunze Region of Soviet Kirghizia (now part of the Sokuluk District, Chüy Region, Kyrgyzstan). His family, like many other Karachays, had been forcibly relocated there in 1943. They were able to return to their ancestral homeland in 1957. After graduating from secondary school in Karachayevsk, he subsequently worked there as a carpenter and concrete worker for a construction firm to gain the required work experience for law school admission. In 1972, he graduated from the Saratov Institute of Law with an honors degree, and later on, he completed his postgraduate studies at the same institute ahead of schedule. He received a Candidate of Sciences (Ph.D. equal) and a Doctor of Sciences (habilitation) degree in constitutional law in 1975 and 1989, respectively.

Upon completing his postgraduate studies, he fulfilled his mandatory military service from 1975 to 1976 in the Soviet internal troops. Beginning in 1977, he held a series of positions at his alma mater.

=== Judicial career ===
On 30 October 1991, he was elected a judge of the Russian Constitutional Court by the 5th Congress of People's Deputies, having been nominated by representatives of the republics within Russia. In 1993, he participated in the Constitutional Conference and served on its commission tasked with finalizing the draft of the new Russian Constitution. He was also a co-author of the Federal Constitutional Law "On the Constitutional Court of the Russian Federation".

Throughout his tenure, he frequently wrote dissenting opinions. In the landmark "Communist Party Case" of 1992, Judge Ebzeyev's dissenting opinion focused extensively on the criteria for declaring a political party unconstitutional—a question the Constitutional Court majority had declined to address. For Ebzeyev, the protection of human rights was a paramount criterion. He argued that the Court had acted prematurely in upholding the constitutionality of the presidential decrees that dissolved the Communist Party.

Again in 1995, he issued a strong dissent when the Court upheld the constitutionality of two pivotal presidential decrees from 1993 and 1994: one outlining the fundamental provisions of Russia's military doctrine, and the other authorizing measures to restore constitutional order and law enforcement in the Chechen Republic (see First Chechen War). Ebzeyev contended that the stated goals of these decrees could not justify the severe consequences that followed their implementation. He maintained that the Court was obligated to assess the decrees not in the abstract, but in the context of their real-world impact.

=== Political career ===
In 1999, he ran for President of Karachay-Cherkessia but was eliminated after the first round of voting.

On 30 July 2008, President Dmitry Medvedev nominated Boris Ebzeyev to the People's Assembly of Karachay-Cherkessia to be confirmed as the republic's president. The Assembly approved his appointment on 5 August 2008.

Ebzeyev stepped down on 26 February 2011, at his own request. His resignation was reportedly prompted by concerns that "the socio-economic situation in Karachay-Cherkessia and the measures implemented by the regional authorities were insufficient to meet the objectives set by the federal president".

He was a member of the Central Election Commission from March 2011. On 25 December 2017, at the Commission's 118th session, he presented the draft resolution that denied registration to the initiative group seeking to nominate Alexei Navalny as a candidate for the Russian presidency.

== Criticism ==
In 2017, Andrey Zayakin from Dissernet accused Boris Ebzeyev of "turning a blind eye to blatant plagiarism and falsified data" and of shielding the practice of defending fake law dissertations during his tenure on the Higher Attestation Commission from 2013 to 2016.

On 12 August 2019, the Anti-Corruption Foundation and Lyubov Sobol accused Boris Ebzeyev of illegal enrichment. According to the investigation, Boris Ebzeyev has a grandson, Arthur Borisovich Ebzeyev. He was 4 years old, when he entered into a contract of purchasing an apartment in Moscow’s elite Ostozhenka district with the area of 274.2 m^{2}., its market value estimated at 500 million rubles. Then a 7-year-old child made a deal with an offshore from the British Virgin Islands and sold this apartment, buying a house in Rublyovka.

== Sanctions ==
From December 2022, Boris Ebzeyev was under United States sanctions for his role in supporting Russia's invasion of Ukraine and organizing referendums in Russian-occupied territories of Ukraine. He faced similar sanctions from Ukraine, Australia and New Zealand.

In December 2023, he was added to the European Union sanctions list for "organising illegal referenda in 2022, as well as illegal elections in September 2023, in occupied parts of Ukraine, thus attempting to legitimise the Russian war of aggression of those parts".

== Death ==
Ebzeyev died on 23 August 2026, at the age of 76.

== Awards and honors ==
- Stolypin Medal, 2nd class (2025)
- Order of Friendship (2011)
- Letter of Gratitude from the President of the Russian Federation (2010)
- Russian Federation Presidential Certificate of Honour (2008)
- Honoured Lawyer of Russia (2004)
- Honoured Scholar of Russia (2000)
- Jubilee Medal "In Commemoration of the 100th Anniversary of the Birth of Vladimir Ilyich Lenin" (1971)

Political offices
| Preceded by Mustafa Batdyyev | President of Karachay-Cherkessia; 2008–2011 | Succeeded by Rashid Temrezov |
