= Vladimir Khubiyev =

Russian politician

- Владимир Хубиев; Владимир Хубийланы
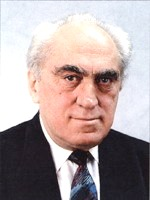

1st Head of Karachay-Cherkessia
- In office 13 January 1992 – 25 May 1999
- Succeeded by: Igor Ivanov (acting)

Chairman of the Council of Ministers of the Karachay-Cherkess Republic
- In office 16 May 1992 – September 1995

Chairman of the Karachay-Cherkess Regional Executive Committee of the Council of People's Deputies
- In office March 1979 – 16 May 1992
- Preceded by: Magomet Botashev

Personal details
- Born: Vladimir Islamovich Khubiyev; 26 March 1932 Arkhyz, Zelenchuksky District, Karachay Autonomous Oblast, RSFSR, Soviet Union
- Died: 17 March 2004 (aged 71) Cherkessk, Russia
- Party: Independent

Vladimir Islamovich Khubiyev (Russian: Владимир Исламович Хубиев; Karachay-Balkar: Хубийланы Исламны джашы Владимир, romanized: Xubiylanı İslamnı caşı Vladimir; 26 March 1932 – 17 March 2004) was a Russian politician who had served as the 1st Head of Karachay-Cherkessia from 1992 to 1999.

== Biography ==
Vladimir Khubiyev was born on 26 March 1932 in the village of Arkhyz. He was a Karachay by ethnicity. When he was 12, he was expelled from Karachay-Cherkessia as a result of the deportation of the Karachays and moved to Kyrgyz SSR. His family returned home in 1957, where he become an agronomist, manager of a branch of the Storozhevsky state farm, and become a member of the Stavropol Agricultural Institute.

=== Education ===
In 1954, he graduated from the Frunze Hydroreclamation Technical School, and in 1969 from the Stavropol Agricultural Institute.

=== Labor activity ===
From 1954 to 1957, he was a technician and land surveyor in Kyrgyzstan.

From 1957 to 1961, he was an agronomist, manager of a branch of the Storozhevsky state farm. In 1961, he was an instructor, and the deputy head of the department of the Karachay-Cherkess Regional Committee of the CPSU. In 1964, he was an inspector, deputy chairman of the regional committee of people's control.

=== Political activity ===
From 1959 to August 1991, he was a member of the CPSU. From 1969 to 1971, he was the Chairman of the Prikubansky District Executive Committee.

From 1971 to 1979, he was the First Secretary of the Karachay District Committee of the CPSU.

From March 1979 to May 1992, Kubiyev became the chairman of the executive committee of the Council of People's Deputies of the Karachay-Cherkess Autonomous Region.

Khubiyev was elected a deputy of the Supreme Soviet of the RSFSR of the 10th and 11th convocations (1980-1989), as a people's deputy of Russia and a member of the Council of Nationalities of the Supreme Soviet of the RSFSR (1990-1993), was a member of the Constitutional Commission, a member of the Supreme Council Committee on Legislation, was a member of factions "Sovereignty and Equality", "Communists of Russia".

On 13 January 1992, Khubiyev became the first head of Karachay-Cherkessia.

In 1993, he was the Chairman of the Council of Ministers of the Karachay-Cherkess Republic. He supported Boris Yeltsin during the events of September October 1993 of the 1993 Russian constitutional crisis. The same year, he was elected a member of the Federation Council.

On 28 April 1995, by decree of President Yeltsin, in agreement with the People's Assembly, Khubiyev was formally appointed Head of the Karachay-Cherkess Republic. He was a member of the working commission to finalize the draft on the Russian constitution.

In 1996, he was a member of the Federation Council ex officio, was a member of the Committee on International Affairs. He was the representative of the Russian Federation in the Chamber of Regions of the Congress of Local and Regional Authorities of Europe from 1995 to 1999. He left office as the head on 25 May 1999.

In the last years of his life, from 2000 to 2003, he worked as an adviser to the Chairman of the Government of the Russian Federation on issues of interethnic relations.

Vladimir Islamovich Khubiyev died on 17 March 2004 in Cherkessk, in intensive care, after a serious illness.

== Family ==
Khubiyev was married to Zoya Kibrovna Khubiyeva, which they had 3 children, and three grandchildren.
