= Vladimir Semyonov (general) =

Soviet general (born 1940)

General of the Army Vladimir Semyonov
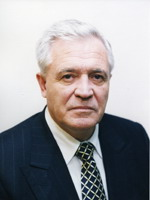

President of Karachay–Cherkessia
- In office 14 September 1999 – 4 September 2003
- Preceded by: Valentin Vlasov (acting)
- Succeeded by: Mustafa Batdyyev

Personal details
- Born: 8 June 1940 (age 86) Khuzruk, Karachay Autonomous Oblast, Soviet Union
- Education: Baku Higher Combined Arms Command School; Frunze Military Academy; Russian General Staff Academy
- Awards: Order of Military Merit

Military service
- Allegiance: Soviet Union (to 1991); Russia
- Branch/service: Soviet Army; Russian Ground Forces
- Years of service: 1958–1996
- Rank: General of the Army
- Commands: Commander-in-Chief of the Russian Ground Forces; Transbaikal Military District

General of the Army Vladimir Magomedovich Semyonov (Note: Russian: Владимир Магомедович Семёнов; Karachay-Balkar: Семенланы Маxaметни джашы Владимир, romanized: Semenlanı Maxametni caşı Vladimir) (born 8 June 1940) is a retired Russian military officer who was the head of the Karachay–Cherkess Republic from 1999 to 2003.

== Biography ==
Semyonov was born on 8 June 1940 in the village of Khuzruk, Karachayevsky District, and has an ethnic Karachay father and an ethnic Russian mother. He is a Sunni Muslim. When he was just four, his family was expelled from their native land and they moved to the Uzbek SSR due to the deportation of the Karachays. He was raised in Bukhara, where Semyonov spent most of his childhood. His family returned home in 1957, following the rehabilitation of the Karachays. One year later in 1958, he joined the Soviet Army. He completed the Baku military college in 1962, the M. V. Frunze Military Academy in 1970 and the General Staff Academy in 1979.

== Career ==
He is a professional military commander. In 1988, Vladimir Semyonov was appointed as the head of the Transbaikal Military District. In 1991, he became a commander-in-chief of Soviet Land Forces and deputy minister of the Ministry of Defence. From 1992 to 1996 Vladimir Semyonov headed the Russian Ground Forces. He was dismissed from his post by the Russian Defence Minister Igor Rodionov in 1996 but returned to duty in 1998 as Chief Military Adviser to the Minister of Defense of Russia.

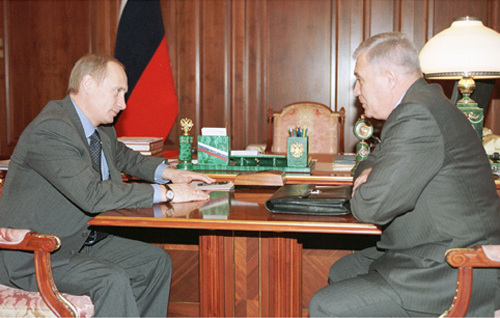
Semyonov with Vladimir Putin, January 2001

In May 1999 he won the presidential elections in Karachay–Cherkessia which caused ethnic tension between Karachays and Cherkesses. The tension was pacified without bloodshed. Vladimir Semyonov tried to solve socio-economic problems of the Republic but in vain. On August 31, 2003, he lost in the general election and left his post to Mustafa Batdyyev.

Semyonov is married with one daughter.

== Notes ==
Military offices
Preceded by Viktor Grishin	Commander of the 29th Combined Arms Army; 1984–1986	Succeeded by Anton Terentyev
Preceded by Pyotr Ledyayev	First Deputy Commander of the Transbaikal Military District; 1986–1988	Succeeded by Valery Tretyakov
Preceded by Anatoly Betekhtin	Commander of the Transbaikal Military District; 1988–1991	Succeeded by Valery Tretyakov
Preceded by Valentin Varennikov	Commander-in-Chief of the Soviet Ground Forces; 1991–1992	Position abolished
Position created	Commander-in-Chief of the Russian Ground Forces; 1992–1997	Succeeded by Yuri Bukreyev as Chief of the Main Directorate
Political offices
Preceded by Valentin Vlasov; Acting	President of the Karachay–Cherkess Republic; 1999–2003	Succeeded by Mustafa Batdyyev
