= Rashid Temrezov =

Head of Karachay-Cherkessia

- Рашид Темрезов; Темирезланы Рашид
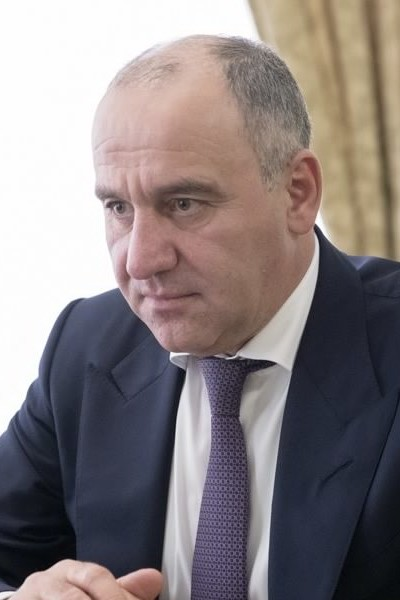
- Temrezov in 2018

4th Head of Karachay–Cherkessia
- Incumbent
- Assumed office 28 February 2011
- Preceded by: Boris Ebzeyev

Personal details
- Born: March 14, 1976 (age 50) Cherkessk, RSFSR, USSR
- Party: A Just Russia; United Russia
- Profession: Statesman

Rashid Borispiyevich Temrezov (Russian: Рашид Бориспиевич Темрезов; Karachay-Balkar: Темирезланы Борисбийни джашы Рашит, romanized: Temirezlanı Borisbiyni caşı Raşit) is a Russian politician who is the head of Karachay–Cherkessia since 2011.

In 2017 he led tributes to the Soviet agronomist Zuhra Bayramkulova.

In response to the Russian invasion of Ukraine, the Office of Foreign Assets Control of the United States Department of the Treasury added Temrezov to the Specially Designated Nationals and Blocked Persons List on 24 February 2023, which results in his assets being frozen and U.S. persons being prohibited from dealing with him.

Political offices
Preceded by Boris Ebzeyev	Head of Karachay-Cherkessia; 2011-present	Succeeded by Incumbent
