= Gubernatoropad =

Gubernatoropad (Russian: Губернаторопад, lit. 'Governors' fall', also Guberopad) is a term in Russian political jargon that refers to the mass removal of Russian regional governors from office in a short period of time.

== Events called gubernatoropad ==
=== Gubernatoropad of 2008 ===
The term was first used by Moskovskij Komsomolets in April 2008 during two resignations of governors in a week.

Region	Resigned governor	Resignation date	Successor	Ref.
Irkutsk Oblast	Alexander Tishanin	15 April 2008	Igor Yesipovsky	
Stavropol Krai	Alexander Chernogorov	22 April 2008	Valery Gayevsky	
Chukotka Autonomous Okrug	Roman Abramovich	3 July 2008	Roman Kopin	

=== Gubernatoropad of February 2016 ===
Region	Resigned governor	Resignation date	Successor	Ref.
Tula Oblast	Vladimir Gruzdev	2 February 2016	Aleksey Dyumin	
Zabaykalsky Krai	Konstantin Ilkovsky	17 February 2016	Natalia Zhdanova	
North Ossetia–Alania	Tamerlan Aguzarov (died)	19 February 2016	Vyacheslav Bitarov	
Tver Oblast	Andrey Shevelyov	2 March 2016	Igor Rudenya	

=== Gubernatoropad of July 2016 ===
Region	Resigned governor	Resignation date	Successor	Ref.
Yaroslavl Oblast	Sergey Yastrebov	28 July 2016	Dmitry Mironov	
Kaliningrad Oblast	Nikolay Tsukanov	28 July 2016	Anton Alikhanov	
Kirov Oblast	Nikita Belykh (arrested)	28 July 2016	Igor Vasilyev	
Sevastopol	Sergey Menyaylo	28 July 2016	Dmitry Ovsyannikov	

=== Gubernatoropad of February 2017 ===
Region	Resigned governor	Resignation date	Successor	Ref.
Perm Krai	Viktor Basargin	6 February 2017	Maxim Reshetnikov	
Buryatia	Vyacheslav Nagovitsyn	7 February 2017	Alexey Tsydenov	
Ryazan Oblast	Oleg Kovalyov	14 February 2017	Nikolay Lyubimov	
Karelia	Aleksandr Hudilainen	15 February 2017	Artur Parfenchikov	

=== Gubernatoropad of Autumn 2017 ===
One of the most massive gubernatoropads took place in September–October 2017.

Region	Resigned governor	Resignation date	Successor	Ref.
Samara Oblast	Nikolay Merkushkin	25 September 2017	Dmitry Azarov	
Nizhny Novgorod Oblast	Valery Shantsev	26 September 2017	Gleb Nikitin	
Krasnoyarsk Krai	Viktor Tolokonsky	27 September 2017	Aleksandr Uss	
Dagestan	Ramazan Abdulatipov	27 September 2017	Vladimir Vasilyev	
Nenets Autonomous Okrug	Igor Koshin	28 September 2017	Alexander Tsybulsky	
Primorsky Krai	Vladimir Miklushevsky	4 October 2017	Andrey Tarasenko	
Oryol Oblast	Vadim Potomsky	5 October 2017	Andrey Klychkov	
Novosibirsk Oblast	Vladimir Gorodetsky	6 October 2017	Andrey Travnikov	
Omsk Oblast	Viktor Nazarov	9 October 2017	Alexander Burkov	
Ivanovo Oblast	Pavel Konkov	10 October 2017	Stanislav Voskresensky	
Pskov Oblast	Andrey Turchak	12 October 2017	Mikhail Vedernikov	

=== Gubernatoropad of Spring 2018 ===
Region	Resigned governor	Resignation date	Successor	Ref.
Kemerovo Oblast	Aman Tuleyev	1 April 2018	Sergey Tsivilyov	
Tyumen Oblast	Vladimir Yakushev	18 May 2018	Aleksandr Moor	
Yamalo-Nenets Autonomous Okrug	Dmitry Kobylkin	18 May 2018	Dmitry Artyukhov	
Magadan Oblast	Vladimir Pechyony	28 May 2018	Sergey Nosov	
Sakha	Yegor Borisov	28 May 2018	Aysen Nikolayev	
Altai Krai	Alexander Karlin	30 May 2018	Viktor Tomenko	

=== Gubernatoropad of Autumn 2018 ===
Region	Resigned governor	Resignation date	Successor	Ref.
Astrakhan Oblast	Alexander Zhilkin	26 September 2018	Sergey Morozov	
Kabardino-Balkaria	Yury Kokov	26 September 2018	Kazbek Kokov	
Primorsky Krai	Andrey Tarasenko	26 September 2018	Oleg Kozhemyako	
Lipetsk Oblast	Oleg Korolyov	2 October 2018	Igor Artamonov	
Kurgan Oblast	Aleksey Kokorin	2 October 2018	Vadim Shumkov	
Saint Petersburg	Georgy Poltavchenko	3 October 2018	Alexander Beglov	
Bashkortostan	Rustem Khamitov	11 October 2018	Radiy Khabirov	
Kursk Oblast	Alexander Mikhailov	11 October 2018	Roman Starovoyt	
Zabaykalsky Krai	Natalia Zhdanova	11 October 2018	Aleksandr Osipov	

=== Gubernatoropad of Spring 2019 ===
Region	Resigned governor	Resignation date	Successor	Ref.
Chelyabinsk Oblast	Boris Dubrovsky	19 March 2019	Aleksey Teksler	
Altai Republic	Alexander Berdnikov	20 March 2019	Oleg Khorokhordin	
Kalmykia	Aleksey Orlov	20 March 2019	Batu Khasikov	
Murmansk Oblast	Marina Kovtun	21 March 2019	Andrey Chibis	
Orenburg Oblast	Yury Berg	21 March 2019	Denis Pasler	

=== Gubernatoropad of December 2019 ===
Region	Resigned governor	Resignation date	Successor	Ref.
Irkutsk Oblast	Sergey Levchenko	12 December 2019	Igor Kobzev	
Jewish Autonomous Oblast	Alexander Levintal	12 December 2019	Rostislav Goldstein	

=== Gubernatoropad of Spring 2020 ===
Region	Resigned governor	Resignation date	Successor	Ref.
Nenets Autonomous Okrug	Alexander Tsybulsky	2 April 2020	Yury Bezdudny	
Arkhangelsk Oblast	Igor Orlov	2 April 2020	Alexander Tsybulsky	
Komi Republic	Sergey Gaplikov	2 April 2020	Vladimir Uyba	
Kamchatka Krai	Vladimir Ilyukhin	3 April 2020	Vladimir Solodov	

=== Gubernatoropad of Autumn 2020 ===
Region	Resigned governor	Resignation date	Successor	Ref.
Belgorod Oblast	Yevgeny Savchenko	22 September 2020	Vyacheslav Gladkov	
Dagestan	Vladimir Vasilyev	5 October 2020	Sergey Melikov	
Mordovia	Vladimir Volkov	18 November 2020	Artyom Zdunov	

=== Gubernatoropad of Spring 2021 ===
Region	Resigned governor	Resignation date	Successor	Ref.
Penza Oblast	Ivan Belozertsev (arrested)	23 March 2021	Oleg Melnichenko	
Tuva	Sholban Kara-ool	7 April 2021	Vladislav Khovalyg	
Ulyanovsk Oblast	Sergey Morozov	8 April 2021	Aleksey Russkikh	
North Ossetia–Alania	Vyacheslav Bitarov	12 April 2021	Sergey Menyaylo	

=== Gubernatoropad of Autumn 2021 ===
Region	Resigned governor	Resignation date	Successor	Ref.
Tambov Oblast	Aleksandr Nikitin	4 October 2021	Maksim Yegorov	
Vladimir Oblast	Vladimir Sipyagin	4 October 2021	Aleksandr Avdeyev	
Yaroslavl Oblast	Dmitry Mironov	12 October 2021	Mikhail Yevrayev	

=== Gubernatoropad of Spring 2022 ===
Region	Resigned governor	Resignation date	Successor	Ref.
Tomsk Oblast	Sergey Zhvachkin	10 May 2022	Vladimir Mazur	
Kirov Oblast	Igor Vasilyev	10 May 2022	Aleksandr Sokolov	
Saratov Oblast	Valery Radayev	10 May 2022	Roman Busargin	
Mari El	Alexander Yevstifeyev	10 May 2022	Yury Zaitsev	
Ryazan Oblast	Nikolay Lyubimov	10 May 2022	Pavel Malkov	

=== Gubernatoropad of Spring 2023 ===
Region	Resigned governor	Resignation date	Successor	Ref.
Chukotka Autonomous Okrug	Roman Kopin	15 March 2023	Vladislav Kuznetsov	
Smolensk Oblast	Alexey Ostrovsky	17 March 2023	Vasily Anokhin	
Omsk Oblast	Alexander Burkov	29 March 2023	Vitaliy Khotsenko	
Krasnoyarsk Krai	Aleksandr Uss	20 April 2023	Mikhail Kotyukov	

=== Gubernatoropad of Spring 2024 ===
In May 2024, several governors received positions in Mikhail Mishustin's Second Cabinet and resigned from their regional positions. Parts of Russian media dubbed this event "gubernatorovzlyot" (Russian: Губернаторовзлёт, lit. 'Governors' rise').

Region	Resigned governor	Resignation date	Successor	Ref.
Khabarovsk Krai	Mikhail Degtyarev	14 May 2024	Dmitry Demeshin	
Kaliningrad Oblast	Anton Alikhanov	14 May 2024	Alexey Besprozvannykh	
Tula Oblast	Aleksey Dyumin	14 May 2024	Dmitry Milyaev	
Kemerovo Oblast	Sergey Tsivilyov	14 May 2024	Ilya Seredyuk	
Kursk Oblast	Roman Starovoyt	14 May 2024	Alexei Smirnov	
Khanty-Mansi Autonomous Okrug	Natalya Komarova	30 May 2024	Ruslan Kukharuk	
Samara Oblast	Dmitry Azarov	31 May 2024	Vyacheslav Fedorishchev	
Altai Republic	Oleg Khorokhordin	4 June 2024	Andrey Turchak	

=== Gubernatoropad of Autumn 2024 ===
Region	Resigned governor	Resignation date	Successor	Ref.
Tambov Oblast	Maksim Yegorov	4 November 2024	Yevgeny Pervyshov	
Rostov Oblast	Vasily Golubev	4 November 2024	Yury Slyusar	
Komi Republic	Vladimir Uyba	5 November 2024	Rostislav Goldstein	
Jewish Autonomous Oblast	Rostislav Goldstein	5 November 2024	Maria Kostyuk	
Kursk Oblast	Alexei Smirnov	5 December 2024	Alexander Khinshtein	
