= 2025 Jewish Autonomous Oblast gubernatorial election =

← 2020	12–14 September 2025	2030 →
- Turnout: 74.22% ▲1.21 pp
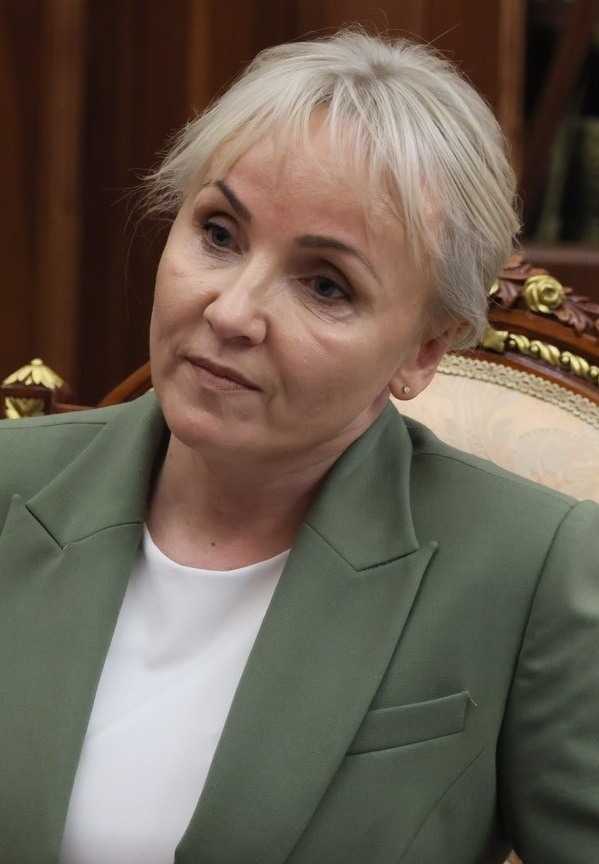
		LDPR
Candidate	Maria Kostyuk	Vasily Gladkikh
Party	United Russia	LDPR
Popular vote	72,086	6,363
Percentage	83.02%	7.33%
- Results by raions and city
Governor before election
Maria Kostyuk (acting)
United Russia
Governor-elect
Maria Kostyuk
United Russia

The 2025 Jewish Autonomous Oblast gubernatorial election took place on 12–14 September 2025, on common election day. Acting Governor of Jewish Autonomous Oblast Maria Kostyuk was elected for a full term in office.

== Background ==
Then-Federation Council member Rostislav Goldstein was appointed acting Governor of Jewish Autonomous Oblast in December 2019, replacing retiring first-term incumbent Alexander Levintal. Golstein ran for a full term in 2020 and overwhelmingly won the election with 82.50% of the vote in absence of CPRF and LDPR candidates.

On November 5, 2024, President of Russia Vladimir Putin appointed Goldstein acting Head of the Komi Republic, simultaneously he appointed Maria Kostyuk to replace Goldstein as Governor of Jewish Autonomous Oblast. Kostyuk previously worked as Goldstein's aide and regional official until 2023, when she moved to Moscow to work for "Defenders of the Fatherland" foundation and RANEPA asTime of Heroes training programme head. Kostyuk also became the first and only serving female Russian governor since the resignation of Natalya Komarova as Governor of Khanty-Mansi Autonomous Okrug in May 2024 and until March 2025, when Irina Gecht was appointed acting Governor of Nenets Autonomous Okrug.

== Candidates ==
In Jewish Autonomous Oblast candidates for Governor of Jewish Autonomous Oblast can be nominated only by registered political parties. Candidate for Governor of Jewish Autonomous Oblast should be a Russian citizen and at least 30 years old. Candidates for Governor of Jewish Autonomous Oblast should not have a foreign citizenship or residence permit. Each candidate in order to be registered is required to collect at least 7% of signatures of members and heads of municipalities. Also gubernatorial candidates present 3 candidacies to the Federation Council and election winner later appoints one of the presented candidates.

=== Declared ===
Candidate name, political party		Occupation	Status	Ref.
Vasily Gladkikh; Liberal Democratic Party		Member of Legislative Assembly of the Jewish Autonomous Oblast (2021–present)	Registered	
Maria Kostyuk; United Russia	Maria Kostyuk	Acting Governor of Jewish Autonomous Oblast (2024–present); Former Deputy Chairwoman of the Government of Jewish Autonomous Oblast (2021–2023)	Registered	
Aleksandr Krupsky; Communists of Russia		Pensioner; 2020 CPSS gubernatorial candidate	Registered	
Aleksandr Shcherbina; Communist Party		Member of Birobidzhan City Duma (2024–present)	Registered	
Vladimir Potapenko; New People		Individual entrepreneur	Withdrew after registration	
Sergey Antropenkov; Rodina		Unemployed	Failed to qualify	
Vladimir Dudin; SR–ZP		Member of Legislative Assembly of the Jewish Autonomous Oblast (2011–present); 2015 and 2020 gubernatorial candidate	Failed to qualify	
Yelena Voroshilova; Party of Pensioners		Former Member of Birobidzhan City Duma (2014–2019); Social services centre director	Failed to qualify	
Dmitry Vedernikov; The Greens		Security guard	Did not file	

=== Eliminated in the primary ===
- Danil Skibinsky (United Russia), First Deputy Mayor of Obluchye (2022–present)
- Mikhail Yurkin (United Russia), community activist

=== Candidates for Federation Council ===
Incumbent Senator Yuri Valyaev (Independent) was not renominated.

Head candidate, political party	Candidates for Federation Council	Status
Vasily Gladkikh; Liberal Democratic Party	* Sergey Gotovchenko, Member of Obluchensky District Council of Deputies (2019–present), train car repairman * Olga Shupilova, teacher * Tatyana Slutskaya, Member of Birobidzhan City Duma (2024–present), natural reserve methodologist	Registered
Maria Kostyuk; United Russia	* Anton Akimov, Deputy Governor of Jewish Autonomous Oblast (2025–present) * Natalya Khorova, Deputy Minister of Health of Russia (2014–present) * Natalya Kuzmina, Rector of the Jewish Autonomous Oblast Institute for Education Development (2022–present)	Registered
Aleksandr Krupsky; Communists of Russia	* Andrey Anoshkin, geographer * Sergey Khorshev, individual entrepreneur * Leonid Popov, businessman	Registered
Aleksandr Shcherbina; Communist Party	* Vladimir Fishman, Member of Legislative Assembly of the Jewish Autonomous Oblast (2006–present) * Nina Kalyukina, party secretary * Yevgeny Konopatkin, former Member of Birobidzhan City Duma (2019–2024), aide to State Duma member Alexey Kornienko	Registered
Vladimir Potapenko; New People	* Aleksandr Abakumets, former Member of Ptichninskoye Rural Council of Deputies (2013–2018), businessman * Dmitry Levkovsky, forestry director * Eduard Penyak, individual entrepreneur	Withdrew after registration
Vladimir Dudin; SR–ZP	* Irina Menshoykina, chemical lab assistant * Natalya Polodyuk, Member of Birobidzhan City Duma (2024–present), youth methodologist * Viktor Yeryomichev, retired train driver	Failed to qualify

== Polls ==
Fieldwork date	Polling firm	Kostyuk	Gladkikh	Shcherbina	Krupsky	Potapenko	None	Lead
14 September 2025	2025 election	83.0	7.3	4.9	3.0	–	1.7	75.7
28 August 2025	Potapenko withdraws from the race							
March – August 2025	INSOMAR	74	9	8	3	2	4	65

== Results ==
Summary of the 12–14 September 2025 Jewish Autonomous Oblast gubernatorial election results
Candidate	Party	Votes	%
Maria Kostyuk (incumbent)	United Russia	72,086	83.02
Vasily Gladkikh	Liberal Democratic Party	6,363	7.33
Aleksandr Shcherbina	Communist Party	4,263	4.91
Aleksandr Krupsky	Communists of Russia	2,612	3.01
Valid votes		85,324	98.27
Blank ballots		1,504	1.73
Total		86,828	100.00
Turnout		86,828	74.22
Registered voters		116,981	100.00

Governor Kostyuk appointed Deputy Minister of Health of Russia Natalya Khorova (Independent) to the Federation Council, replacing incumbent Senator Yuri Valyaev (Independent).

== See also ==
- 2025 Russian regional elections
