= List of female heads of federal subjects of Russia =

This is a list of women who served as heads (governors) of Federal subjects of Russia.

== History ==
The first female head of a federal subject in the Russian Federation was Valentina Bronevich, who was Governor of Koryak Autonomous Okrug from 1996 to 2000.

Of the 89 current heads of federal subjects, two are females. These are Maria Kostyuk, Governor of Jewish Autonomous Oblast since September 23, 2025, and Irina Gecht, Governor of Nenets Autonomous Okrug since September 25, 2025.

== List ==
Denotes incumbent head of federal subject
- Italics denotes an acting head of federal subject.

Name	Image	Party	Title and federal subject	Mandate start	Mandate end	Term length	Departure	Ref.
Valentina Bronevich		Independent	Governor; Koryakia	17 November 1996	16 December 2000	4 years, 29 days	Lost reelection	
Valentina Matviyenko		Independent → United Russia	Governor; Saint Petersburg	15 October 2003	22 August 2011	7 years, 311 days	Resigned to become Senator from Saint Petersburg	
Maria Bolshakova		Independent	Acting Governor; Ulyanovsk Oblast	29 November 2004	6 January 2005	38 days	Resigned after the inauguration of Sergey Morozov	
Natalya Komarova		United Russia	Governor; Khanty-Mansi Autonomous Okrug	1 March 2010	30 May 2024	14 years, 90 days	Resigned to become Senator from Khanty-Mansi Autonomous Okrug	
Marina Kovtun		United Russia	Governor; Murmansk Oblast	13 April 2012	21 March 2019	7 years, 8 days	Resigned from office	
Svetlana Orlova		United Russia	Governor; Vladimir Oblast	24 March 2013	8 October 2018	5 years, 198 days	Lost reelection	
Natalia Zhdanova		United Russia	Governor; Zabaykalsky Krai	18 February 2016	11 October 2018	2 years, 235 days	Resigned from office	
Irina Sokolova			Acting Premier (Note: A position held ex officio by governor. The governor's office itself was vacant at that period.); Yamalo-Nenets Autonomous Okrug	18 May 2018	29 May 2018	11 days	Replaced by Dmitry Artyukhov as acting governor	
Vera Shcherbina		United Russia	Acting Governor; Sakhalin Oblast	26 September 2018	7 December 2018	72 days	Replaced by Valery Limarenko as acting governor	
Olga Antipina		Independent	Acting Premier; Perm Krai	21 January 2020	6 February 2020	16 days	Replaced by Dmitry Makhonin as acting governor	
Nadezhda Aksyonova			Acting Governor; Murmansk Oblast	5 April 2024	11 April 2024	6 days	Replaced by Oksana Demchenko as acting governor	
Oksana Demchenko			Acting Governor; Murmansk Oblast	11 April 2024	18 April 2024	7 days	Stepped down upon Andrey Chibis re-assuming office	
Maria Kostyuk		United Russia	Governor; Jewish Autonomous Oblast	5 November 2024	Incumbent	1 year, 332 days		
Irina Gecht		United Russia	Governor; Nenets Autonomous Okrug	18 March 2025	Incumbent	1 year, 199 days		
Marina Podtikhova			Acting Governor; Tver Oblast	29 September 2025	5 November 2025	37 days	Replaced by Vitaly Korolyov as acting governor	
Olga Abramova		United Russia	Acting Head of the Republic; Udmurtia	29 July 2026	Incumbent	66 days		

== See also ==
- List of current heads of federal subjects of Russia
