= 2013 Russian elections =

- 8 September 2013

10 heads of federal subjects 16 regional parliaments
- 2013 Russian elections: Gubernatorial Legislative Legislative (of another subject) Gubernatorial and legislative

The 2013 Russian elections were held in large part, on Sunday, 8 September 2013 (single election day). It was the first year when the single election day was held in September. Various snap elections for local offices were also held throughout the year.

== Gubernatorial elections ==
=== Direct ===
Federal Subject	Incumbent	Incumbent since	Candidates
Khakassia	Viktor Zimin	2009	✓ Viktor Zimin (UR) 63.41%; Viktor Sobolev (LDPR) 9.94%; Igor Chunchel (CPRF) 8.66%; Denis Brazauskas (CPCR) 5.63%
Zabaykalsky Krai	Ravil Geniatulin (term expired March)	1996 (Note: As governor of Chita Oblast.)	✓ Konstantin Ilkovsky (SR) 71.63%; Nikolay Merzlikin (CPRF) 11.64%; Vasilina Kuliyeva (LDPR) 10.13%
Zabaykalsky Krai	Konstantin Ilkovsky (acting)	2013	✓ Konstantin Ilkovsky (SR) 71.63%; Nikolay Merzlikin (CPRF) 11.64%; Vasilina Kuliyeva (LDPR) 10.13%
Khabarovsk Krai	Vyacheslav Shport	2009	✓ Vyacheslav Shport (UR) 63.92%; Sergey Furgal (LDPR) 19.14%; Viktor Postnikov (CPRF) 9.73%
Vladimir Oblast	Nikolay Vinogradov (term expired March)	1996	✓ Svetlana Orlova (UR) 74.73%; Anatoly Bobrov (CPRF) 10.64%; Vladimir Sipyagin (LDPR) 3.88%
Vladimir Oblast	Svetlana Orlova (acting)	2013	✓ Svetlana Orlova (UR) 74.73%; Anatoly Bobrov (CPRF) 10.64%; Vladimir Sipyagin (LDPR) 3.88%
Magadan Oblast	Nikolay Dudov (term expired February)	2003	✓ Vladimir Pechyony (UR) 73.11%; Sergey Ivanitsky (CPRF) 14.84%; Sergey Plotnikov (LDPR) 5.32%
Magadan Oblast	Vladimir Pechyony (acting)	2013	✓ Vladimir Pechyony (UR) 73.11%; Sergey Ivanitsky (CPRF) 14.84%; Sergey Plotnikov (LDPR) 5.32%
Moscow Oblast	Sergei Shoigu (resigned)	2012	✓ Andrey Vorobyov (UR) 78.94%; Konstantin Cheremisov (CPRF) 7.72%; Gennady Gudkov (Yabloko) 4.43%
Moscow Oblast	Andrey Vorobyov (acting)	2012	✓ Andrey Vorobyov (UR) 78.94%; Konstantin Cheremisov (CPRF) 7.72%; Gennady Gudkov (Yabloko) 4.43%
Moscow	Sergey Sobyanin	2010 (Note: Resigned to trigger a snap election.)	✓ Sergey Sobyanin (Ind) (Note: Member of United Russia, ran as independent.) 51.37%; Alexei Navalny (RPR–PARNAS) 27.24%; Ivan Melnikov (CPRF) 10.69%
Chukotka AO	Roman Kopin	2008	✓ Roman Kopin (UR) 79.84%; Olga Vasina (LDPR) 9.80%; Pyotr Chyornenky (SR) 7.43%

=== Indirect ===
Federal Subject	Incumbent	Incumbent since	Results
Dagestan	Magomedsalam Magomedov (resigned)	2010	✓ Ramazan Abdulatipov 86 / 90; Ummupazil Omarova 2 / 90; No vote 2 / 90
Dagestan	Ramazan Abdulatipov (acting)	2013	✓ Ramazan Abdulatipov 86 / 90; Ummupazil Omarova 2 / 90; No vote 2 / 90
Ingushetia	Yunus-bek Yevkurov	2008	✓ Yunus-bek Yevkurov 25 / 27; Uruskhan Yevloyev 2 / 27

== Legislative elections ==
Parties clearing the electoral threshold (varying from 5% to 7% in each region) are highlighted.

Legislature	Voting system	Party-list results					District seats	Majority
Legislature	Voting system	UR	CPRF	LDPR	SR	Other (Note: Only parties that crossed the threshold are included.)	District seats	Majority
Bashkortostan, State Assembly	Parallel (55 PR + 55 FPTP)	76.06% (49)	11.70% (6)	3.72%	2.81%	—	UR 39, CPRF 4, LDPR 3, PoR 1, AZ–NP 1, PSSo 1, Ind 6	88 / 110
Buryatia, People's Khural	Parallel (33 PR + 33 FPTP)	43.34% (20)	19.37% (8)	6.11% (1)	9.06% (4)	—	UR 25, SR 2, GP 1, RPPS 1, Ind 4	45 / 66
Kalmykia, People's Khural	Party-list proportional	51.34% (18)	11.41% (4)	2.60%	4.55%	GP 9.37% (3) PoR 5.77% (2)	none	18 / 27
Sakha (Yakutia), State Assembly	Parallel (35 PR + 35 FPTP)	47.41% (22)	12.82% (5)	6.30% (1)	16.01% (7)	—	UR 29, SR 2, ZaZhR 1, Ind 3	51 / 70
Khakassia, Supreme Council	Parallel (25 PR + 25 FPTP)	46.32% (14)	14.40% (4)	16.55% (5)	3.91%	CPCR 6.44% (2)	UR 20, CPRF 2, PoR 1, Ind 2	34 / 50
Chechnya, Parliament	Party-list proportional	85.94% (37)	0.19%	0.08%	7.27% (3)	PoR 5.07% (1)	none	37 / 41
Zabaykalsky Krai, Legislative Assembly	Parallel (25 PR + 25 FPTP)	43.09% (14)	14.15% (4)	13.38% (4)	10.45% (3)	—	UR 22, SR 1, Ind 2	36 / 50
Arkhangelsk Oblast Assembly of Deputies	Parallel (31 PR + 31 FPTP)	40.69% (18)	12.88% (5)	12.30% (4)	10.46% (3)	Rodina 6.18% (1)	UR 25, SR 2, CPRF 1, PoR 1, Rodina 1, Ind 1	43 / 62
Vladimir Oblast, Legislative Assembly	Parallel (19 PR + 19 FPTP)	44.33% (13)	13.54% (3)	9.92% (2)	6.96% (1)	—	UR 19	32 / 38
Ivanovo Oblast Duma	Parallel (13 PR + 13 FPTP)	55.77% (10)	14.57% (2)	6.99% (1)	4.39%	—	UR 12, RPPS 1	22 / 26
Irkutsk Oblast, Legislative Assembly	Parallel (23 PR + 22 FPTP)	42.36% (13)	18.87% (5)	11.28% (3)	4.07%	GP 8.51% (2)	UR 16, GP 2, CPRF 1, LDPR 1, Ind 2	29 / 45
Kemerovo Oblast, Council of People's Deputies	Parallel (23 PR + 23 FPTP)	86.21% (22)	2.58%	3.93% (1)	1.86%	—	UR 22, SR 1	44 / 46
Rostov Oblast, Legislative Assembly	Parallel (30 PR + 30 FPTP)	62.45% (24)	14.71% (4)	4.73%	7.97% (2)	—	UR 28, CPRF 2	52 / 60
Smolensk Oblast Duma	Parallel (24 PR + 24 FPTP)	41.17% (13)	15.02% (4)	13.49% (4)	7.58% (2)	RPPS 6.07% (1)	UR 23, CPRF 1	36 / 48
Ulyanovsk Oblast, Legislative Assembly	Parallel (18 PR + 18 FPTP)	57.62% (15)	14.08% (2)	7.24% (1)	3.03%	—	UR 16, CPRF 2	31 / 36
Yaroslavl Oblast Duma	Parallel (25 PR + 25 FPTP)	42.25% (16)	11.07% (4)	5.12% (1)	9.67% (3)	RPR–PARNAS 5.11% (1)	UR 23, GP 1, Greens 1	39 / 50
Total (incl. district seats)	825 seats	637	73	32	36	47	—	637 / 825

== Mayoral elections ==
The table includes capital cities of federal subjects (11) and urban okrugs with 100,000+ inhabitants.

City	Date	Incumbent	Incumbent since	Candidates	Result
Kemerovo, Kemerovo Oblast	27 January	Vladimir Mikhailov (resigned)	1991	✓ Valery Yermakov (UR) 90.99%; Irina Orekhova (LDPR) 3.71%	New mayor elected to a vacant position.
Zhukovsky, Moscow Oblast	31 March	Aleksandr Bobovnikov (resigned)	2000	✓ Andrey Voytyuk (Ind) 36.77%; Igor Novikov (GP) 27.66%; Aleksandr Anikanov (CPRF) 25.04%; Sergey Troitsky (Ind) 2.29%	New mayor elected to a vacant position.
Maykop, Adygea	26 May	Mikhail Chernichenko (resigned)	1991	✓ Alexander Narolin (UR) 61.83%; Sergey Polyakov (Ind) 15.80%; Vladimir Karatayev (GR) 11.73%	New mayor elected to a vacant position.
Abakan, Khakassia	8 September	Nikolay Bulakin	1995	✓ Nikolay Bulakin (Ind) 81.79%; Aleksandr Semyonov (CPRF) 9.54%	Incumbent re-elected.
Gelendzhik, Krasnodar Krai	8 September	Viktor Khrestin	2005	✓ Viktor Khrestin (UR) 91.39%; Svetlana Kubenskaya (LDPR) 4.07%	Incumbent re-elected.
Khabarovsk, Khabarovsk Krai	8 September	Aleksandr Sokolov	2000	✓ Aleksandr Sokolov (UR) 67.90%; Pyotr Perevezentsev (CPRF) 10.07%; Gennady Savochkin (LDPR) 8.70%	Incumbent re-elected.
Novokuznetsk, Kemerovo Oblast	8 September	Valery Smolego (resigned)	2010	✓ Sergey Kuznetsov (UR) 86.72%; Igor Ukraintsev (LDPR) 7.63%	New mayor elected to a vacant position.
Petrozavodsk, Karelia	8 September	Nikolay Levin	2009	✓ Galina Shirshina (Ind) 41.94%; Nikolay Levin (UR) 28.93%; Grigory Fandeyev (Ind) 5.18%	Incumbent lost re-election. New mayor elected.
Prokopyevsk, Kemerovo Oblast	8 September	Valery Garanin	1999	✓ Valery Garanin (UR) 94.50%; Yevgeny Mangazeyev (LDPR) 4.68%	Incumbent re-elected.
Rybinsk, Yaroslavl Oblast	8 September	Yury Lastochkin	2009	✓ Yury Lastochkin (UR) 81.46%; Sergey Salov (LDPR) 6.58%; Roman Smirnov (Ind) 5.35%	Incumbent re-elected.
Veliky Novgorod, Novgorod Oblast	8 September	Yury Bobryshev	2008	✓ Yury Bobryshev (UR) 38.56%; Yevgeny Kuzikov (SR) 23.91%; Sergey Svetlov (Ind) 18.74%; Dmitry Perevyazkin (CPCR) 5.29%	Incumbent re-elected.
Vladivostok, Primorsky Krai	8 September	Igor Pushkaryov	2008	✓ Igor Pushkaryov (UR) 59.45%; Viktor Cherepkov (AZ–NP) 18.90%; Oleg Velgodsky (CPRF) 10.34%	Incumbent re-elected.
Vologda, Vologda Oblast	8 September	Evgeny Shulepov	2008	✓ Evgeny Shulepov (UR) 48.28%; Aleksandr Lukichev (GP) 23.44%; Nikolay Dolzhansky (CPRF) 7.54%	Incumbent re-elected.
Volzhsky, Volgograd Oblast	8 September	Marina Afanasyeva (SR)	2009	✓ Igor Voronin (UR) 59.43%; Dmitry Litvintsev (LDPR) 17.42%; Pyotr Shabeko (Ind) 7.43%; Roman Tkachyov (Rodina) 6.89%	Incumbent removed from ballot. Former mayor re-elected.
Voronezh, Voronezh Oblast	8 September	Sergey Koliukh	2008	✓ Aleksandr Gusev (UR) 43.62%; Galina Kudryavtseva (AZ–NP) 26.68%; Konstantin Ashifin (CPRF) 18.34%	Incumbent did not stand for re-election. New mayor elected.
Yekaterinburg, Sverdlovsk Oblast (Note: Non-executive, largely ceremonial mayor within a council–manager government.)	8 September	Yevgeny Porunov (mayor–chairman of the City Duma)	2010	✓ Yevgeny Roizman (GP) 33.31%; Yakov Silin (UR) 29.71%; Alexander Burkov (SR) 20.25%	Incumbent did not stand for re-election. New mayor elected.
Yekaterinburg, Sverdlovsk Oblast	8 September	Aleksandr Yakob (city manager)	2010	✓ Yevgeny Roizman (GP) 33.31%; Yakov Silin (UR) 29.71%; Alexander Burkov (SR) 20.25%	Incumbent did not stand for re-election. New mayor elected.
Tomsk, Tomsk Oblast	13 October	Nikolay Nikolaychuk	2007	✓ Ivan Klein (UR) 62.23%; Vladimir Kazakov (SR) 14.14%; Gleb Fetisov (AZ–NP) 11.09%	Incumbent did not stand for re-election. New mayor elected.
