= 2024 Zabaykalsky Krai gubernatorial election =

- 6–8 September 2024
- Turnout: 43.91%
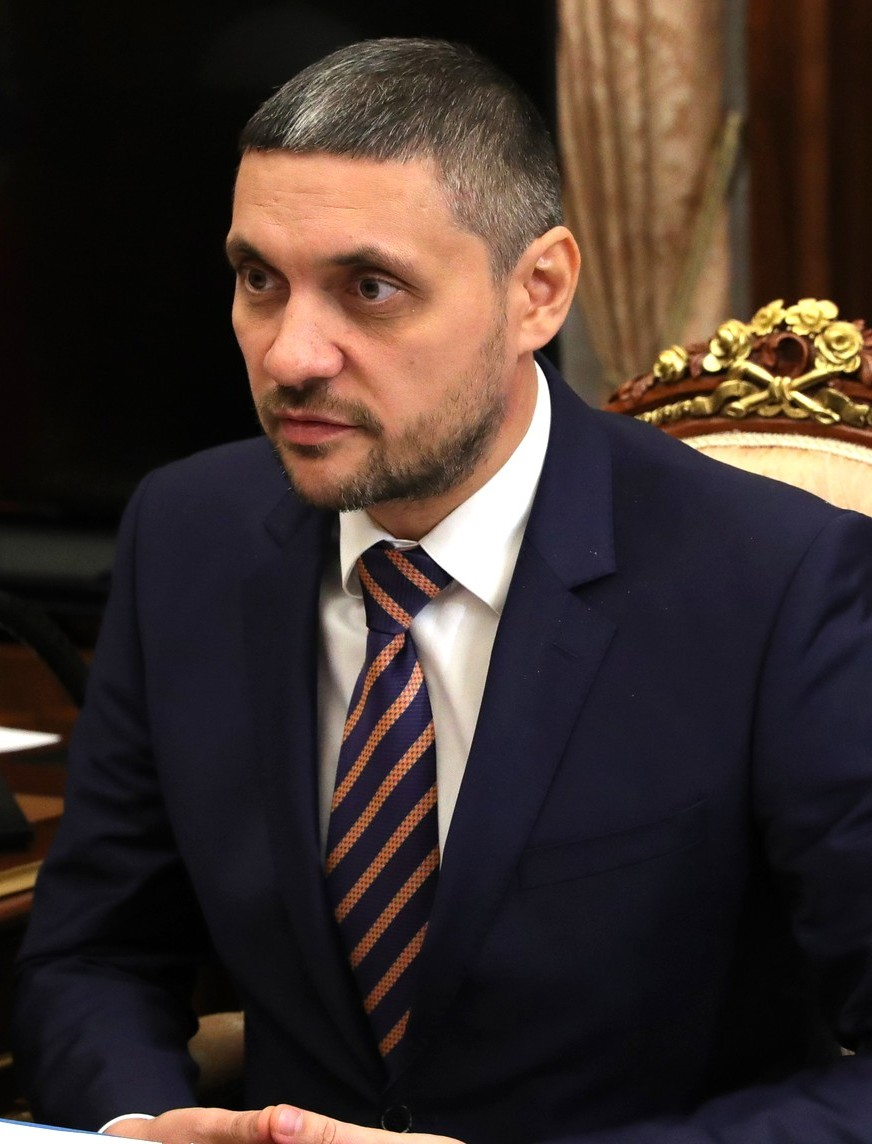
		LDPR
Candidate	Aleksandr Osipov	Georgy Shilin
Party	Independent	LDPR
Popular vote	274,444	24,806
Percentage	82.27%	7.44%
Governor before election
Aleksandr Osipov
Independent
Governor-elect
Aleksandr Osipov
Independent

The 2024 Zabaykalsky Krai gubernatorial election will take place on 6–8 September 2024, on common election day. Incumbent Governor Aleksandr Osipov was re-elected to a second term in office.

== Background ==
Aleksandr Osipov, former First Deputy Minister for the Development of the Far East and Arctic, was appointed acting Governor of Zabaykalsky Krai in October 2018. Osipov replaced retiring Governor Natalia Zhdanova, who resigned at her own request three years before the end of her first term. Zhdanova's resignation was mostly credited to low performance in socio-economic development, decreasing approval ratings and poor results of United Russia in the 2018 regional elections.

Legislative Assembly of Zabaykalsky Krai changed the electoral law in March 2019, allowing Independent candidates to run in the gubernatorial election. Osipov ran for a full term as an independent and overwhelmingly won with 89.61% against three candidates from minor parties, as candidates from major opposition parties (CPRF, LDPR, A Just Russia) were absent from the ballot.

In April 2024 during a meeting with President Vladimir Putin Governor Osipov announced his intention to run for a second term and received Putin's endorsement.

== Candidates ==
In Zabaykalsky Krai candidates for Governor can be nominated by registered political parties or by self-nomination. Candidate for Governor of Zabaykalsky Krai should be a Russian citizen and at least 30 years old. Candidates for Governor should not have a foreign citizenship or residence permit. Each candidate in order to be registered is required to collect at least 8% of signatures of members and heads of municipalities. In addition, self-nominated candidates should collect 0.5% of signatures of Zabaykalsky Krai residents. Also gubernatorial candidates present 3 candidacies to the Federation Council and election winner later appoints one of the presented candidates.

=== Declared ===
Candidate name, political party		Occupation	Status	Ref.
Valery Afitsinsky; The Greens		Former Member of Duma of Chita (2014–2019)	Registered	
Konstantin Korostelyov; Communists of Russia		Former Member of Legislative Assembly of Zabaykalsky Krai (2018–2023)	Registered	
Aleksandr Osipov; Independent	Aleksandr Osipov	incumbent Governor of Zabaykalsky Krai (2018–present)	Registered	
Georgy Shilin; Liberal Democratic Party		Member of Legislative Assembly of Zabaykalsky Krai (2013–present)	Registered	
Natalya Kochergina; Independent		Member of Civic Chamber of Zabaykalsky Krai (2016–present)	Withdrew after registration	
Vyacheslav Palshin; Independent		Youth center director	Withdrew after registration	
Yury Grigoriev; SR–ZP	Yury Grigoriev	Member of State Duma (2021–present)	Failed to qualify	
Valentina Podoynitsyna; Independent		Former Member of Chita Oblast Duma (2000–2008)	Did not file	
Andrey Shcherbakov; Independent		Businessman	Did not file	
Maksim Shipitsyn; Communist Party		Former First Deputy Prosecutor of Zabaykalsky Krai (2009–2021)	Did not file	

=== Declined ===
- Yury Gayduk (CPRF), Member of Legislative Assembly of Zabaykalsky Krai (2018–present), 2019 gubernatorial candidate

=== Candidates for Federation Council ===
Gubernatorial candidate, political party	Candidates for Federation Council	Status
Valery Afitsinsky; The Greens	* Yelizaveta Baranova, financial director * Irina Barysheva, Chita Administration official * Sergey Kisloshchayev, sports instructor	Registered
Konstantin Korostelyov; Communists of Russia	* Vladimir Ivanchenko (United Russia), Member of Legislative Assembly of Zabaykalsky Krai (2013–present) * Yekaterina Rakhmetulova, theatre deputy director * Daniil Tsypalov, railroad event planner	Registered
Aleksandr Osipov; Independent	* Natalya Epova, Commissioner for Children's Rights of Zabaykalsky Krai (2023–present) * Eduard Shcherbina, mine worker * Bair Zhamsuyev (United Russia), incumbent Senator (2013–present)	Registered
Georgy Shilin; Liberal Democratic Party	* Sergey Dyubin, military instructor * Vasilina Kuliyeva, Member of State Duma (2011–2012, 2016–2021, 2023–present) * Viktor Yefimov, Member of Legislative Assembly of Zabaykalsky Krai (2023–present), businessman	Registered
Natalya Kochergina; Independent	* Damdin Badmatsyrenov, Member of Civic Chamber of Zabaykalsky Krai * Andrey Cherepanov, educator * Aleksandr Potyayev, newspaper publisher	Withdrew after registration
Vyacheslav Palshin; Independent	* Maria Korotich, nonprofit staffer * Vyacheslav Razdobreyev, youth work specialist * Yevgeny Shadrin, employers association executive director	Withdrew after registration
Yury Grigoriev; SR–ZP	* Galina Abramova, Chairwoman of the Tungiro-Olyokminsky District Council (2016–present) * Alyona Gantimurova, Member of Duldurginsky District Council (2017–present), teacher * Nikolay Seleznev, former Member of Chitinsky District Council (2013–2023), former Head of Chitinsky District (2013–2018)	Failed to qualify

== Results ==
Summary of the 6–8 September 2024 Zabaykalsky Krai gubernatorial election results
Candidate	Party	Votes	%
Aleksandr Osipov (incumbent)	Independent	274,444	82.27
Georgy Shilin	Liberal Democratic Party	24,806	7.44
Konstantin Korostelyov	Communists of Russia	15,617	4.68
Valery Afitsinsky	The Greens	10,716	3.21
Valid votes		325,583	97.60
Blank ballots		8,004	2.40
Total		333,587	100.00
Turnout		333,587	43.91
Registered voters		759,657	100.00

Governor Osipov re-appointed incumbent Senator Bair Zhamsuyev (United Russia) to the Federation Council.

== See also ==
- 2024 Russian regional elections
