= Governor of Zabaykalsky Krai =

Highest-ranking official in Zabaykalsky Krai, Russia

- Coat of Arms of Zabaykalsky Krai

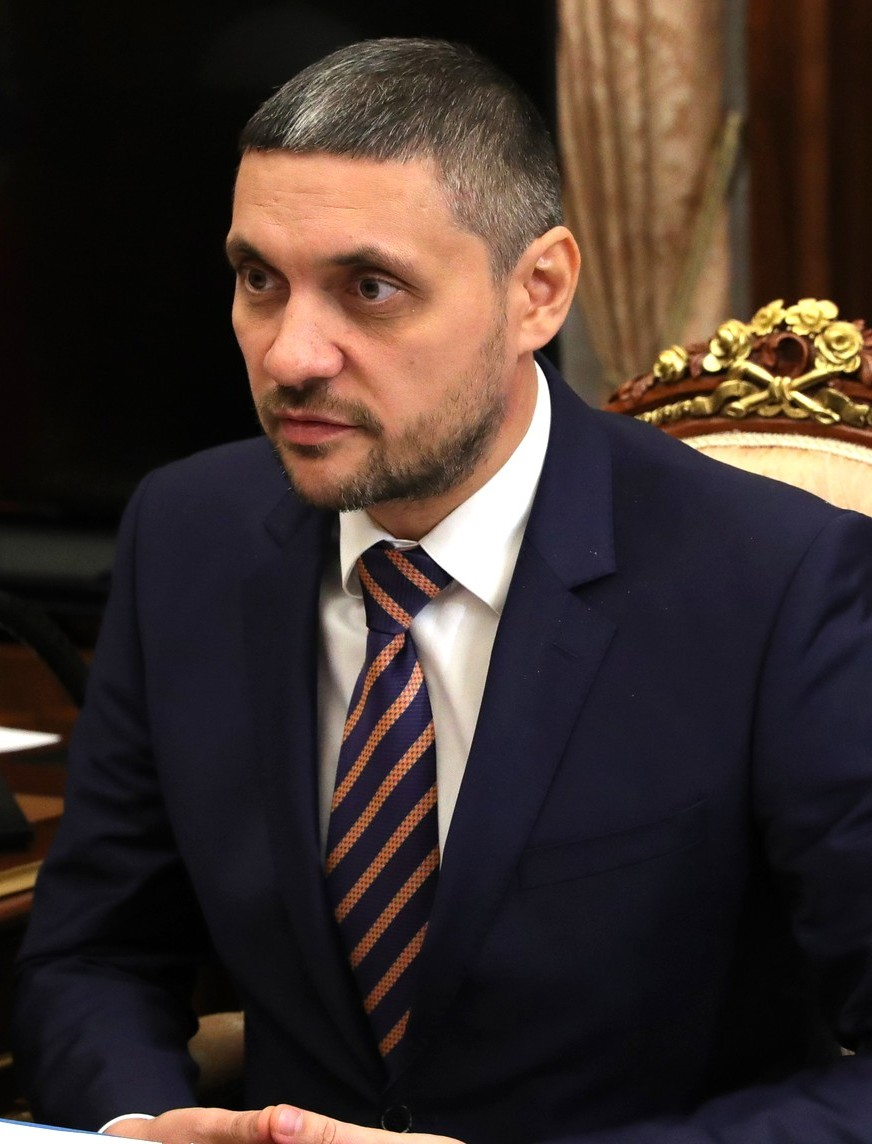
- Incumbent; Aleksandr Osipov since 25 October 2018
- Status: Head of federal subject
- Residence: Chita
- Term length: 5 years
- Inaugural holder: Boris Ivanov / Ravil Geniatulin
- Formation: 1991; 2008 (current form)
- Website: 75.ru

The Governor of Zabaykalsky Krai (Russian: Губернатор Забайкальского края) is the head of the executive branch of government in Zabaykalsky Krai, Russia (former Chita Oblast and Agin-Buryat Autonomous Okrug).

== List of officeholders ==
The office of the Head of Administration of Chita Oblast was introduced in November 1991, when Russian president Boris Yeltsin appointed then-chairman of Chita Oblast executive committee Boris Ivanov to serve in this position until a successor is elected by popular vote. In February 1996, Ivanov resigned from office as well as several governors seemed by Yeltsin administration as weak and unpopular. Ivanov was replaced by mayor of Chita Ravil Geniatulin, who then went on to win the election of October 1996, and was re-elected twice in 2000 and 2004. He had remained a nonpartisan politician throughout his term, although he led United Russia party list in the 2008 legislative election. The style of office was changed to "governor of Chita Oblast" in 2005 following an amendment to the regional Charter (constitution).

In 2008, a new federal subject of Russia, Zabaykalsky Krai, was created following a regional referendum. Effectively, Agin-Buryat Autonomous Okrug was annexed into Chita Oblast. Before the merger, the autonomous okrug had an unclear status, recognised both as a part of Chita Oblast and a federal subject in its own right. Zabaykalsky Krai became the fifth and last case of merger of remote and underpopulated autonomous okrugs with their mother regions. Following the merger, Ravil Geniatulin was reappointed for a five-year term, as gubernatorial elections were abolished countrywide at that moment. He retired in 2013, replaced by State Duma member Konstantin Ilkovsky from A Just Russia party.

No.	Portrait	Governor	Tenure	Time in office	Party	Election
1		Boris Ivanov (born 1941)	30 November 1991 – 22 January 1996 (resigned)	4 years, 53 days	Independent	Appointed
2		Ravil Geniatulin (born 1955)	1 February 1996 – 1 March 2008 (unification)	12 years, 29 days	Independent	Appointed 1996; 2000; 2004
On 1 March 2008, Chita Oblast and Agin-Buryat Autonomous Okrug were merged into Zabaykalsky Krai.
(2)		Ravil Geniatulin (born 1955)	1 March 2008 – 1 March 2013 (retired)	5 years, 0 days	Independent	2008 (Note: Appointed by the president of Russia with the consent of the Chita Oblast Duma.)
–		Konstantin Ilkovsky (born 1964)	1 March 2013 – 18 September 2013	2 years, 353 days	A Just Russia	Acting
3		Konstantin Ilkovsky (born 1964)	18 September 2013 – 17 February 2016 (resigned)	2 years, 353 days	A Just Russia	2013
–		Natalia Zhdanova (born 1964)	18 February 2016 – 29 September 2016	2 years, 235 days	United Russia	Acting
4		Natalia Zhdanova (born 1964)	29 September 2016 – 11 October 2018 (resigned)	2 years, 235 days	United Russia	2016
–		Aleksandr Kulakov (born 1966)	11 October 2018 – 25 October 2018	14 days	United Russia	Acting
–		Aleksandr Osipov (born 1969)	25 October 2018 – 19 September 2019	7 years, 323 days	Independent	Acting
5		Aleksandr Osipov (born 1969)	19 September 2019 – present	7 years, 323 days	Independent	2019; 2024

== Elections ==
=== 8 September 2019 ===
Place	Candidate	Party	Votes	%
1.	Aleksandr Osipov	Self-nominated	248,580	89.61
2.	Yelena Krauze	Party of Pensioners	9,230	3.33
3.	Vyacheslav Ushakov	Patriots of Russia	7,173	2.59
4.	Yana Shpak	Party of Growth	5,739	2.07

=== 18 September 2016 ===
Place	Candidate	Party	Votes	%
1.	Natalia Zhdanova	United Russia	165,472	54.39
2.	Nikolay Merzlikin	Communist Party	87,434	28.74
3.	Anatoly Vershinin	Agrarian Party of Russia	29,694	9.76
4.	Tagir Aglyamov	Patriots of Russia	10,154	3.34
