= Governor (Russia) =

Highest official of a Russian federal subject

The highest official of the subject of the Russian Federation, also known as the holder of the highest office of subject of the Russian Federation (Russian: высшее должностное лицо субъекта Российской Федерации) or the head of the highest executive body of state power of the subject of the Russian Federation (Russian: руководитель высшего исполнительного органа государственной власти субъекта Российской Федерации) and colloquially and collectively referred to as the title Governor (Russian: губернатор - gubernator) or head of region (Russian: глава региона - glava regiona), is the head and the chief executive of each of the federal subjects of Russia, not directly subordinate to the federal authorities, but the political and ceremonial head of the federal subject, all of which are equal constituent entities of Russia.

The office is defined by the Constitution of Russia and Chapters 1, 3 and 4 of Russia's Federal Law No. 184-FZ "On the General Principles of the Organization Of the Legislative (Representative) and Executive Organs Of State Power of the Subjects of the Russian Federation" which came into force in 1999. According to the current revision of the Russian Constitution, the Russian Federation consists of 89 federal subjects (including the six regions of Ukraine that are occupied by Russia), therefore there are 89 offices of head of region in Russia (see List of current heads of federal subjects of Russia).

The certain title of office is defined by the federal subject's Constitution or Charter. The names include: Governor, Head of Administration (Russian: глава администрации - glava administratsii), Head of Republic (Russian: глава республики - glava respubliki), Mayor (Russian: мэр - mer), Rais (Russian: раис - rais) non-officially and collectively referred to as Governors for short. The official title "Governor" is most used in Russia and traditionally it is used in Oblasts of Russia. Heads of Russia's republics, mayor of Moscow and governors of Saint Petersburg and Sevastopol are also governors in this sense.

A head of the subject in Russia is said to serve a administration or executive office, colloquially referred to as gubernatorial administration.

== Role and powers ==
The Constitution preserves the notion that the country is a federation of semi-sovereign federal subjects and that powers not specifically granted to the federal government are retained by the federal subjects. Federal subjects, therefore, are not administrative divisions. Regional governments in Russia are relatively powerful; each federal subject has its own independent criminal and civil law codes, as well as manages its internal government.

The governor thus heads the executive branch in the federal subjects and, depending on the individual jurisdiction, may have considerable control over government budgeting, the power of appointment of many officials (including many judges), and a considerable role in legislation. The governor may also have additional roles, and in many territories the governor has partial or absolute power to commute or pardon a criminal sentence. All governors serve five-year terms for no more than two terms in a row.

In all federal subjects, the governor is directly elected, and in most cases has considerable practical powers, though this may be moderated by the legislature and in some cases by other elected executive officials.

A governor may give an annual address about his achievements in order to satisfy a constitutional stipulation that a governor must report annually (or in older constitutions described as being "from time to time") on the territory or condition of the republic/oblast. Governors of oblasts may also perform ceremonial roles, such as greeting dignitaries, conferring state decorations, issuing symbolic proclamations. The governor may also have an official residence.

== History ==
In modern Russia, the governor - is the highest official figure in the Russian Federation (territory, region, autonomous region, city), heads the executive branch in the Republics and oblasts of the Russian Federation.

On November 30, 1991, Presidential decree of Yeltsin, appointed Boris Nemtsov to the post of governor of the Nizhny Novgorod region in and the first week of work at the new location, Nemtsov then issued a decree according to which he, the head of the regional government, is to be officially called the governor. Thus, he became the first governor of the new Russia.

From 1995 to 2005, governors were elected by the residents of the Russian Federation in the framework of direct, equal and secret ballot. From 2005 to 2012, governors were appointed by the legislative (representative) bodies of subjects of the Russian Federation by the recommendation of the President of Russia.

On June 1, 2012, an Act came into force, which returns the direct election of senior officials in the regions. In 2015, governors were restricted to a term of five years, with no more than two consecutive terms.

== Demographics ==
=== Party ===
As of September 2021 there are 57 members of United Russia, 3 Communists, 3 Liberal Democrats, two members of A Just Russia, and 20 independents serving as governors.

=== Tenure ===
For each term, governors serve five years in office.

The longest-serving current governor is Ramzan Kadyrov, the Head of the Chechen Republic, in office since 2007. Overall longest-serving governor is Yevgeny Savchenko of Belgorod Oblast, who has served seven consecutive terms from 1993 to 2020.

List of longest-serving governors
Name	Title	Took office	Left office	Term length
Yevgeny Savchenko	Governor of Belgorod Oblast	11 October 1993	22 September 2020	26 years, 11 months and 11 days
Aman Tuleyev	Governor of Kemerovo Oblast	1 July 1997	25 January 2001	20 years, 6 months and 21 days
Aman Tuleyev	Governor of Kemerovo Oblast	4 May 2001	1 April 2018	20 years, 6 months and 21 days
Leonid Polezhayev	Governor of Omsk Oblast	11 November 1991	30 May 2012	20 years, 6 months and 19 days
Oleg Korolyov	Head of Administration of Lipetsk Oblast	14 April 1998	2 October 2018	20 years, 5 months and 18 days
Viktor Kress	Governor of Tomsk Oblast	20 October 1991	17 March 2012	20 years, 4 months and 26 days
Ramzan Kadyrov	Head of the Chechen Republic	15 February 2007	Incumbent	19 years, 2 months and 29 days
Anatoly Artamonov	Governor of Kaluga Oblast	18 November 2000	13 February 2020	19 years, 2 months and 26 days
Mintimer Shaimiev	President of Tatarstan	4 July 1991	25 March 2010	18 years, 8 months and 21 days
Vladimir Chub	Governor of Rostov Oblast	8 October 1991	14 June 2010	18 years, 8 months and 6 days
Yury Luzhkov	Mayor of Moscow	6 June 1992	28 September 2010	18 years, 3 months and 22 days
Alexander Filipenko	Governor of Khanty-Mansi AO	18 November 1991	1 March 2010	18 years, 3 months and 11 days
Nikolay Volkov	Governor of Jewish AO	14 December 1991	24 February 2010	18 years, 2 months and 10 days

=== Gender ===
The first female governor was Valentina Bronevich who was governor of Koryak Autonomous Okrug from 1996 to 2000. Currently, there is only one female governor out of the total number of 89, namely Maria Kostyuk, who has been serving as the acting Governor of Jewish Autonomous Oblast since 5 November 2024.
