= Natalya Khorova =

Russian politician (born 1969)

- Наталья Хорова
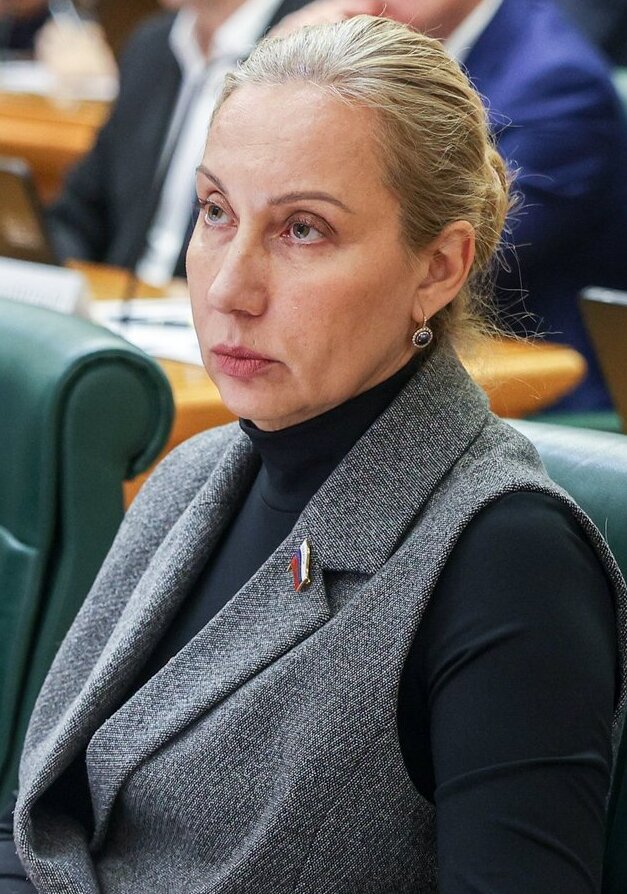

Senator from the Jewish Autonomous Oblast
- Incumbent
- Assumed office 23 September 2025
- Preceded by: Yuri Valyaev

Deputy Minister of Health of Russia
- In office 11 June 2014 – 23 September 2025

Personal details
- Born: 12 November 1969 (age 56) Samara Oblast, RSFSR, Soviet Union
- Party: Independent
- Education: Samara State Academy of Economics
- Awards: Medal of the Order "For Merit to the Fatherland"; Honoured Economist of Russia

Natalya Aleksandrovna Khorova (Russian: Наталья Александровна Хорова; born November 12, 1969) is a Russian politician, and economist. She has served as a senator of the Federation Council and as a representative of the executive branch of the Jewish Autonomous Oblast since September 23, 2025. She has also served as Deputy Chair of the Federation Council Committee on Budget and Financial Markets since October 22, 2025.

She is 1st class Active State Councillor of the Russian Federation (2021). She is also an Honoured Economist of Russia (2017).

== Biography ==
Natalia Khorova was born on November 12, 1969, in Kuybyshev Oblast.

In 1993, she graduated from the Samara Institute of Economics with a degree in finance and credit. In 2004, she graduated from the Samara State Academy of Economics with a degree in jurisprudence.

She has worked in various positions in healthcare and financial institutions. She served as an economist, head of the planning and economic department of a territorial medical association, chief treasurer-inspector of the Federal Treasury for the city of Syzran, and head of the municipal treasury of the financial department of the Syzran City Administration, Samara Oblast.

In 2004, she joined the civil service at the Ministry of Health of Russia. From 2005, she held the position of deputy director of the Finance Department of the Ministry of Health of Russia. From 2012, she served as Director of the Finance and Economic Department of the Ministry.

On June 11, 2014, she was appointed Deputy Minister of Health of the Russian Federation.

=== Federation Council ===
On September 23, 2025, following the election of the head of the Jewish Autonomous Oblast, Governor-elect Maria Kostyuk granted Natalya Khorova the powers of a senator representing the regional government. She joined the Federation Council Committee on Budget and Financial Markets. On October 22, 2025, she was appointed deputy chair of this committee.
