= Gabibulla Khasaev =

Russian economist

Gabibulla Rabadanovich Khasaev
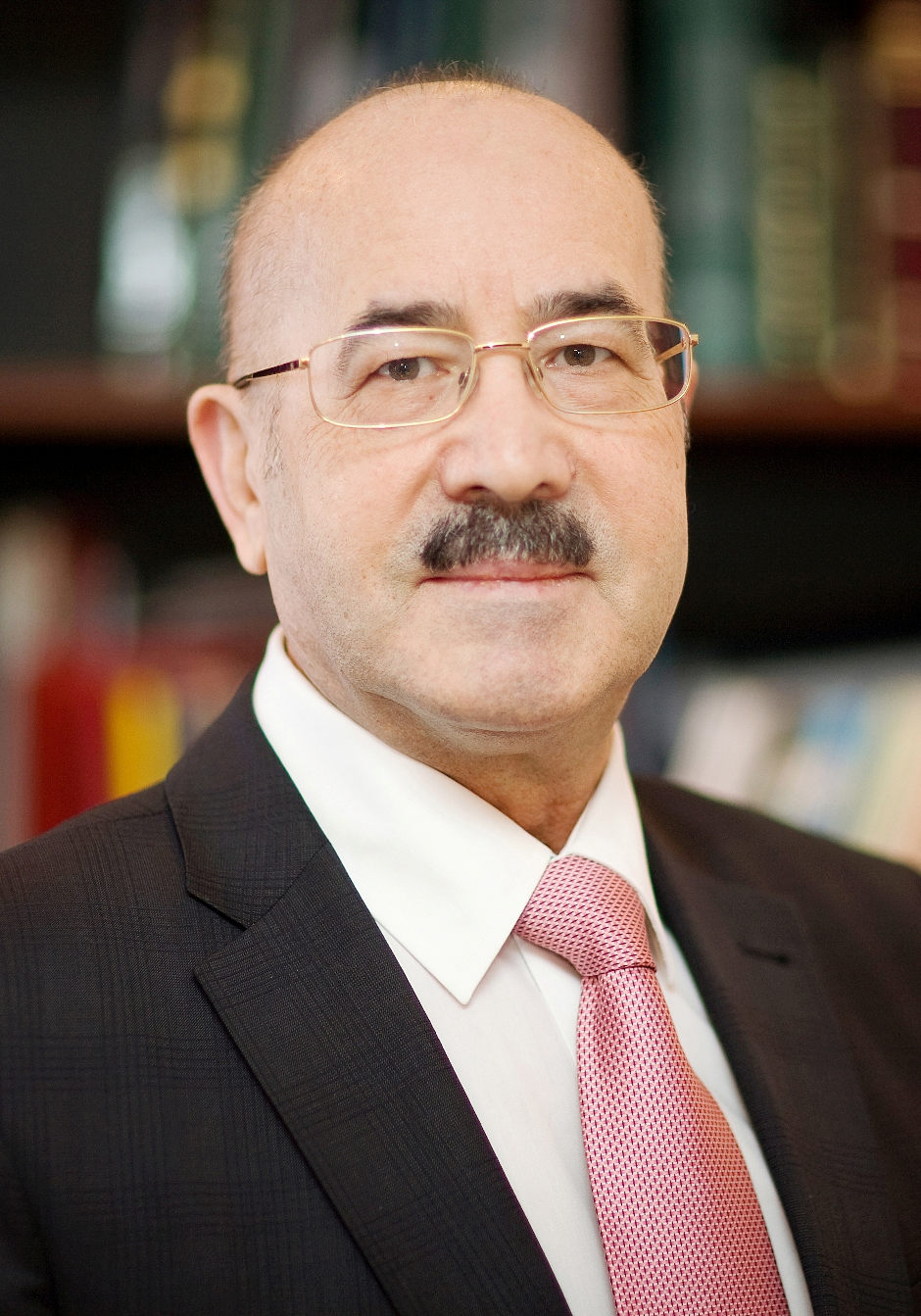

Chancellor of the Samara State University of Economics
- Incumbent
- Assumed office 2013

Personal details
- Born: April 2, 1951 (age 75) Jirabachi, Kaytagsky District, Dagestan Autonomous Soviet Socialist Republic
- Education: Samara State University of Economics
- Known for: Chancellor SSEU
- Website: Chancellor's page
- Scientific career
- Fields: Economics

Gabibulla Rabadanovich Khasaev is a Russian economist. Since 2013, he has served as chancellor of the Samara State University of Economics.

== Biography ==
Khasaev was born January 2, 1951, in the village of Jirabachi, Kaytagsky District, Dagestan Autonomous Soviet Socialist Republic. In 1969 Khasaev studied at Kuibishev Planning Institute. In 1973 he graduated with honored certificate with a specialization in National Economy Planning, and was chosen to receive a Lenin scholarship.

After graduation he undertook postgraduate study and began working on his dissertation. After that he worked as a teacher, a head teacher and an assistant professor. He had a yearly scientific internship in High School of Economics in Prague. In 1984 he was elected as the Head of the Department of National Economy Planning in the institute.

At the end of 1990s Khasaev took the position of deputy chairperson of City Planning Committee. Since 1991 he was the first Deputy Head of Administration of Samara region, managing its financial-economic bloc.

In the Government of Samara region he worked from 1991 to October 2011; in different periods he held positions such as vice-governor, deputy Chairman of the Government of Samara region, minister of economic development, investments and trade of Samara region.

He continued working at the Samara State University of Economics, starting as the head of the Department of National Economics and National Recourses, becoming director of the Institute of National Economics.

== Research ==
Khasaev researched the problems of regional economy, forecasting social-economic development of Russia, municipal formations, social and demographic processes in the region, human resource management, cluster and innovation policy. He produced more than 120 works (monographies, articles, preprint, outlines) and 9 academic works (sections in textbooks, teaching guides and business role-plays)

For more than 40 years, Khasaev was linked with Samara and its university. In November 2011 he was elected chancellor of Samara State University of Economics.

== Awards And nominations ==
He was a Laureate of Governorate Prize in the field of science and technology and Governor's Prize of Samara region.

He was awarded with Order of Friendship, Academic Lapel Pin “Honorary Official of Higher Professional Education of Russian Federation”, Academic Lapel Pin “For Merit for Samara Region”, Medal of Gottfried Wilhelm von Leibnitz “For Merit in the field of Scientific Research” and with other governmental and social awards.
