= Boris Ivanov (politician) =

Russian politician

- Борис Иванов

1st Head of Chita Oblast Administration
- In office 30 November 1991 – 22 January 1996
- Succeeded by: Ravil Geniatulin

Chairman of Chita Oblast Executive Committee
- In office 1 April 1991 – 5 November 1991
- Preceded by: Konstantin Shabarshin
- Succeeded by: position abolished

Personal details
- Born: Boris Petrovich Ivanov; 7 July 1941 (age 84) Toropets, Kalinin Oblast, Soviet Union

Boris Petrovich Ivanov (Russian: Борис Петрович Иванов; born 7 July 1941) is a Russian politician who had served as the first governor of Chita Oblast from 1991 to 1996. He was the chairman of the Board of the commercial bank "Zabaikalzoloto Bank" in Chita.

== Biography ==
Boris Ivanov was born in Toropets on 7 July 1941.

He graduated from the Kemerovo Industrial College and the All-Union Financial and Economic Institute. He worked as a foreman, teacher at a vocational school in Novokuznetsk, in Kemerovo Oblast, in the Novokuznetsk district committee of the Komsomol, headed the sector of the All-Union shock Komsomol construction projects of the Kemerovo regional committee of the Komsomol.

Between 1968 and 1972, he went on a business trip to Mongolia, where worked in construction organizations. In 1972, he was a foreman, head of the site in construction organizations in Kemerovo, then became the head of the industrial and transport department of the district committee of the CPSU. From 1980 to 1987, he was a chairman of the Planning Commission, and then the deputy chairman of the executive committee of the Kemerovo City Council, and then promoted to the chairman of the Planning Commission of the executive committee of the Kemerovo Oblast Council of People's Deputies. From 1987 to 1990, he was elected a chairman of the Planning Commission, and in 1990, he was the head of the Main Planning and Economic Department and then the First Deputy Chairman of the Chita Oblast executive committee.

On 1 April 1991, Ivanov was elected chairman of the Chita Regional Executive Committee.

On 30 November 1991, Ivanov was appointed as the first head of administration (governor) of Chita Oblast.

In 1993, he unsuccessfully ran for the Federation Council of the first convocation. He was one of the organizers of the Chita regional branch of the Party of Russian Unity and Accord in 1993.

In January 1996, he intended to resign as governor at his own request. He was officially dismissed 22 January.

He has state awards of the USSR and Mongolia.

He worked as chairman of the board of the commercial bank Zabaikalzolotobank in 1996 to 1998.
