= Aleksandr Kulakov (politician) =

Russian politician

- Александр Кулаков
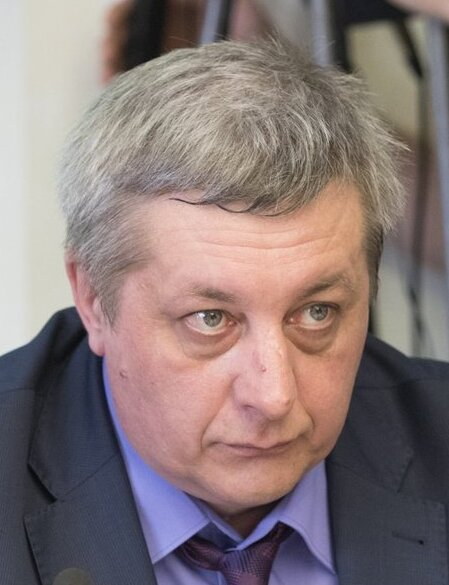
- Kulakov in 2018

Governor of Zabaykalsky Krai (acting)
- In office 11 October 2018 – 25 October 2018
- Preceded by: Natalia Zhdanova
- Succeeded by: Aleksandr Osipov

First Deputy Governor of Zabaykalsky Krai
- In office 14 March 2016 – 7 December 2018
- Governor: Natalia Zhdanova; Aleksandr Osipov

Personal details
- Born: Aleksandr Sergeyevich Kulakov; 5 May 1966 (age 59) Murmansk, Russian SFSR, Soviet Union
- Party: United Russia

Aleksandr Sergeyevich Kulakov (Russian: Александр Сергеевич Кулаков; born 5 May 1966), is a Russian politician and former military officer and power engineer. He served as the acting Governor of Zabaykalsky Krai from 11 October to 25 October 2018.

== Biography ==
Aleksandr Kulakov was born in Murmansk on 5 May 1966.

From 1984 to 1986, he served in military service in the Soviet Army.

In 1990, he graduated from the Vologda Polytechnic Institute with a degree in Heat and Gas Supply and Ventilation. The same year, he began working at the Murmansk TEZ, where he went from a steam and gas turbine equipment repairman to a centralized repair shop to deputy chief engineer and deputy technical director. From 2005 to 2009 he was promoted as a Deputy Technical Director for Operations, and Deputy Chief Engineer of Murmanskaya TEZ OJSC. In 2006, he received additional professional training in the program “Management of the financial and economic activity of an enterprise and organization” at the Interdisciplinary Institute for Advanced Studies in St. Petersburg.

From 2009 to 2013, he was a Deputy Director, Director of the Branch of TGC-14 OJSC “Generation of Buryatia”. From 2013 to 2014, he temporarily performed the duties of the General Director of TGC-14 in Chita. On 30 April 2014, by the decision of the Board of Directors of TGK-14, he was promoted as General Director. From December 2015, he held the position of General Director of Chitaenergosbyt.

In 2014, Kulakov entered politics and was to the Legislative Assembly of the Zabaykalsky Krai.

On 2 December 2015, the board of directors of TGK-14 satisfied Kulakov's statement of decision in connection with his transfer to another job.

On 14 March 2016, Acting Governor of the Zaybaykalsky Krai, Natalia Zhdanova, appointed Kulakov as the Acting First Deputy. After Zhdanova was elected as Governor, he retained his position.

After Zhdanova's resignation, he was promoted as the Acting Governor of Zaybakalsky Krai from 11 October to 25 October 2018.

After another acting Governor Aleksandr Osipov took office, he was eventually dismissed as First Deputy of Zabaykalsky Krai on 7 December 2018.
