= Evgeny Shulepov =

Russian politician (1958–2025)

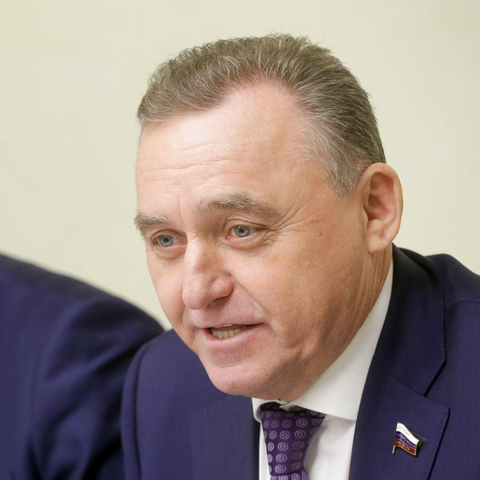
Shulepov in 2018

Evgeny Borisovich Shulepov (Russian: Евге́ний Бори́сович Шуле́пов; 8 June 1958 – 17 September 2025) was a Russian politician and former mayor of Vologda, Vologda Oblast, from 2008 until 2016.

== Life and career ==
Shulepov was born in Kroplevo, Gryazovetsky District, Vologda Oblast, Russian SFSR, USSR on 8 June 1958. He served as a deputy of the Legislative Assembly of Vologda Oblast (2021–2025). From 2008 to 2016, he was the mayor of the city of Vologda. Deputy of the State Duma of the Russian Federation of the VII convocation (2016–2021). He was a member of the United Russia party, and a member of the State Duma Committee on Financial Markets.

On 13 May 2024, he was the subject of a bribery case.

Shulepov died on 17 September 2025, at the age of 67.
