= Alexander Filipenko =

Russian politician (born 1950)

- Александр Филипенко
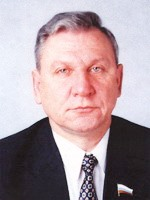

Auditor of the Accounts Chamber
- In office 3 March 2010 – 20 June 2018
- Preceded by: Aleksandr Nazarov
- Succeeded by: Mikhail Men

1st Governor of Khanty–Mansi Autonomous Okrug
- In office 18 November 1991 – 1 March 2010
- Succeeded by: Natalya Komarova

Personal details
- Born: 31 May 1950 (age 75) Karaganda, Kazakh SFSR, Soviet Union
- Party: United Russia
- Children: Vasily, Sophia, Alexander
- Profession: Politician
- Awards

Alexander Vasilyevich Filipenko (Russian: Алекса́ндр Васи́льевич Филипе́нко; born 31 May 1950) is a Russian politician, the former governor of Khanty-Mansi Autonomous Okrug.

== Early life ==
Filipenko was born on 31 May 1950 in Karaganda, which was then part of the Kazakh SFSR. Filipenko's father was named Vasily and his mother was Tatyana Romanovna.
