= Ruslan Kukharuk =

Russian politician (born 1979)

- Руслан Кухарук
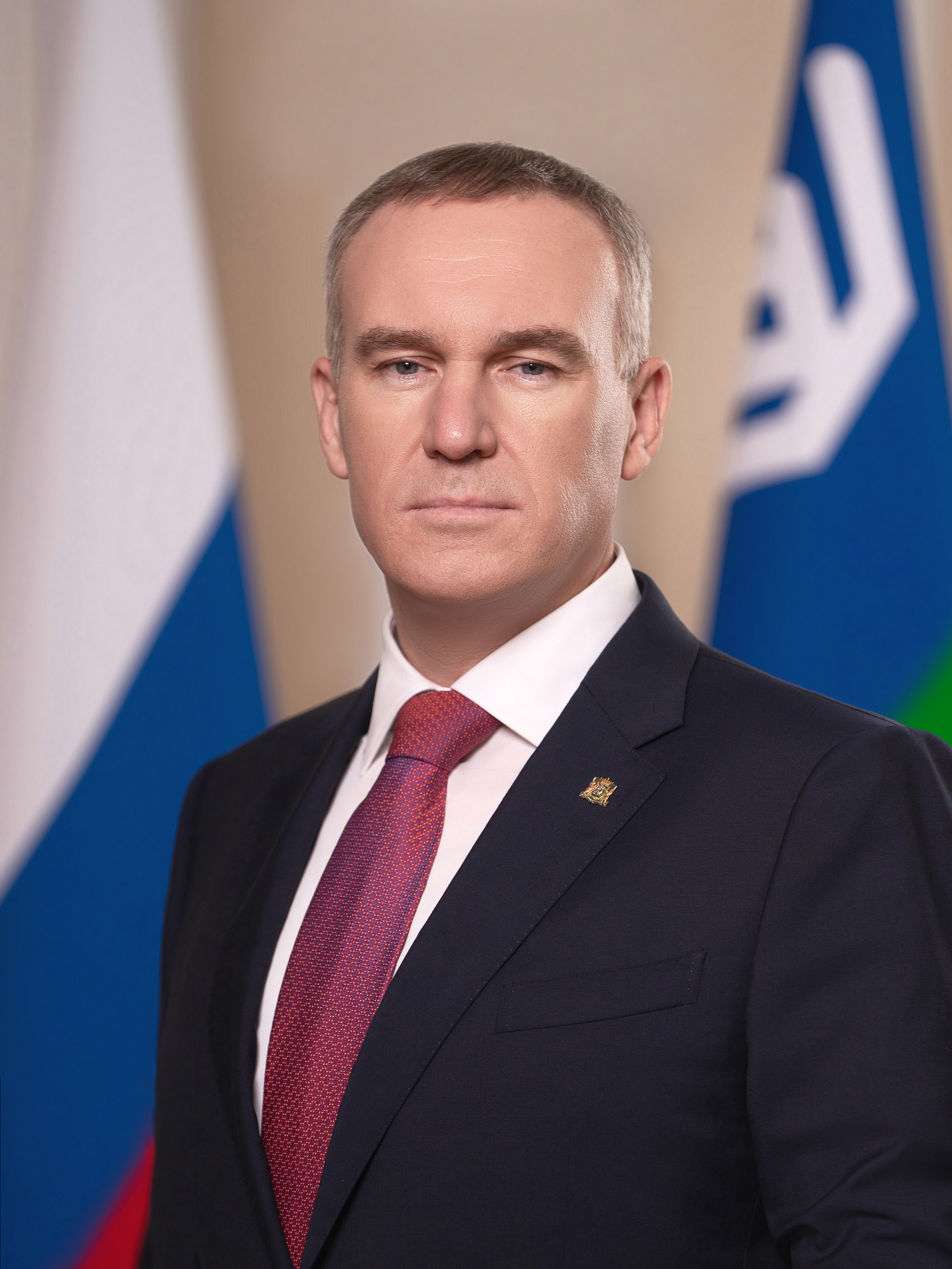
- Official portrait, 2024

Governor of Khanty–Mansi Autonomous Okrug
- Incumbent
- Assumed office 8 September 2024; Acting: 30 May 2024 – 8 September 2024
- Preceded by: Natalya Komarova

Mayor of Tyumen
- In office 8 October 2018 – 30 May 2024
- Governor: Aleksandr Moor
- Preceded by: Dmitry Yeremeyev
- Succeeded by: Pyotr Vagin (acting)

Personal details
- Born: 8 May 1979 (age 47) Uray, Khanty-Mansi Autonomous Okrug, Tyumen Oblast, Russian Soviet Federative Socialist Republic, Soviet Union
- Party: United Russia
- Education: University of Tyumen

Ruslan Nikolayevich Kukharuk (Russian: Руслан Николаевич Кухарук; born May 8, 1979) is a Russian statesman and politician. He is the current Governor of Khanty–Mansi Autonomous Okrug since September 8, 2024.

== Biography ==
Ruslan Kuharuk was born in Uray, Khanty-Mansi Autonomous Okrug, Tyumen Oblast to a Ukrainian father from Khmelnytskyi Oblast and a Russian-Zyryan mother.

In 2001, Kuharuk received a law degree from the University of Tyumen. After graduation, he started working as a lawyer in the department for legal and organizational and personnel work of the Tyumen district administration. From 2002 to 2011, he was the leading specialist of the legal department, head of the department of legal support of land relations, and head of the department of disposal and lease of land plots in the department of property relations of the Tyumen region.

In 2011, Kuharuk was appointed Director of the Department of Land Relations and Urban Planning of the Tyumen City Administration. He left the position in 2016 to become deputy head of the Tyumen administration.

By decision of the Tyumen region Duma, he temporarily acted as head of the Tyumen city administration from 31 May to 8 October 2018. On 8 October 2018, he was elected head of Tyumen.

On 30 May 2024, Vladimir Putin appointed Ruslan Kuharuk as the acting Governor of Khanty–Mansi Autonomous Okrug.
