= Governor of Khanty–Mansi Autonomous Okrug =

Highest-ranking official in Khanty–Mansi Autonomous Okrug, Russia

- Coat of Arms of KhMAO

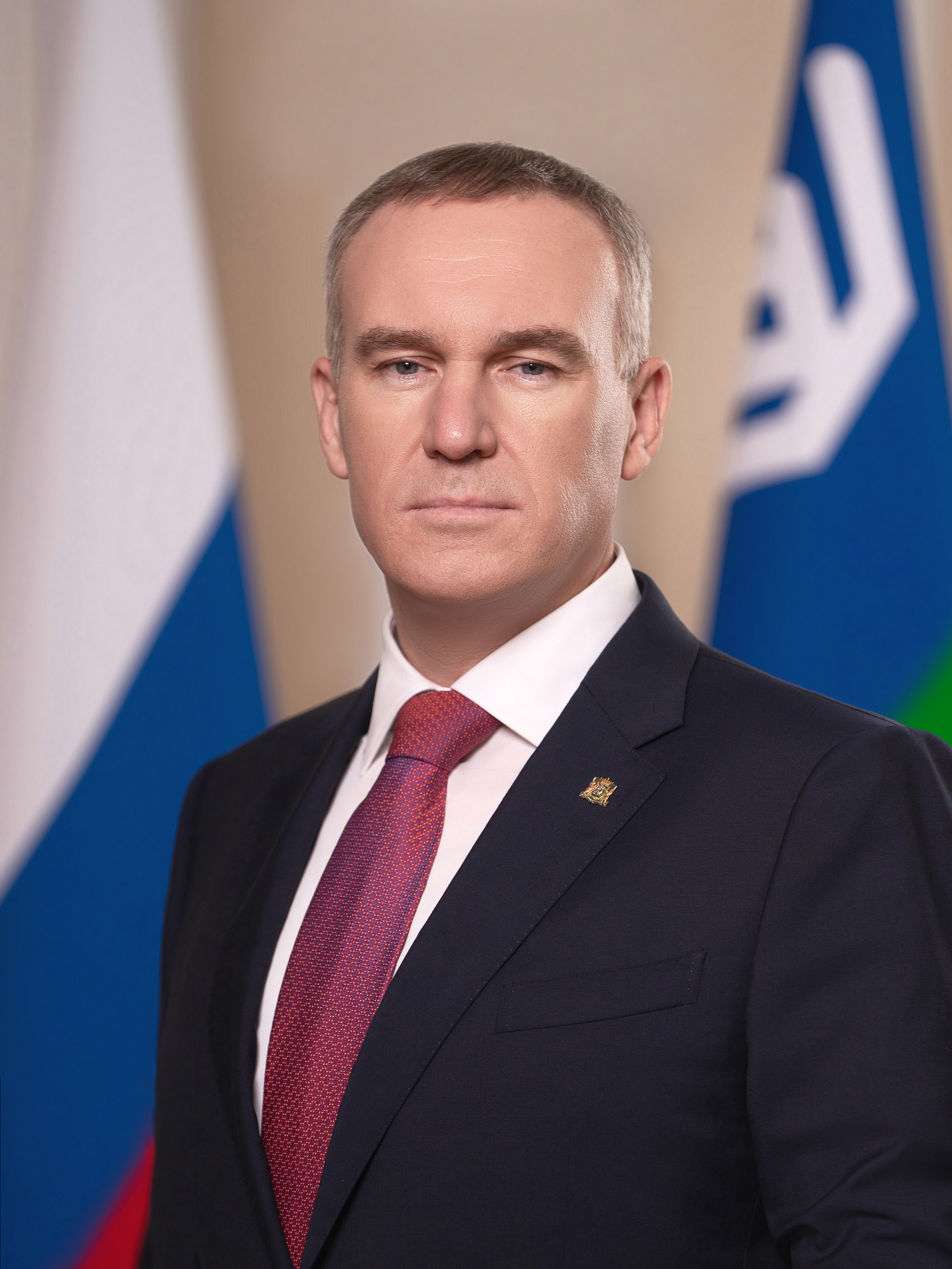
- Incumbent; Ruslan Kukharuk since 8 September 2024
- Style: His Excellency, Mr. Governor
- Seat: Khanty-Mansiysk
- Nominator: President of Russia
- Appointer: Indirect election
- Term length: 5 years
- Formation: 1991
- First holder: Alexander Filipenko
- Website: admhmao.ru

The Governor of Khanty–Mansi Autonomous Okrug — Yugra (Note: Russian: Губернатор Ханты-Мансийского автономного округа — Югры) is the head of the executive branch of the Khanty–Mansi Autonomous Okrug, a federal subject of Russia located in Western Siberia. The Governor is elected by the Duma of Khanty-Mansi Autonomous Okrug for a term of five years.

== History of office ==
On 18 November 1991, Alexander Filipenko was appointed Head of Administration of Khanty-Mansi Autonomous Okrug by the decree of the President of Russia Boris Yeltsin. Since 1989 Filipenko was the chairman of Khanty-Mansi regional executive committee (ispolkom), an executive body under the Soviet system. On 27 October 1996, he won the election, receiving more than 70% of the vote. Filipenko was reelected in 2000. Following the countrywide cancelation of the direct gubernatorial elections, which occurred in December 2004, Filipenko's fourth term was legitimised by the regional legislature.

On 8 February 2010, with the expiration of Filipenko's term of office, the President of Russia Dmitry Medvedev proposed the candidacy of MP Natalya Komarova to the Duma of Khanty-Mansi Autonomous Okrug. She was supported unanimously and was sworn in on 1 March 2010, becoming Russia's third female governor.

Despite the fact that elections of the governors by popular vote were legalised again in 2012, Khanty-Mansi Autonomous Okrug had chosen to keep the vote-in-parliament procedure, but now without the president's sorting of the candidates list. This gave the regional government a possibility to "annull" Komarova's first term. She successfully reelected in 2015 and 2020.

== List of governors ==
No.	Portrait	Governor	Term of office	Time in office	Party	Election
1		Alexander Filipenko (born 1950)	18 November 1991 – 1 March 2010 (term end)	18 years, 103 days	Independent → United Russia	Appointed 1996; 2000; 2005 (Note: Appointed by the president of Russia with the consent of the Duma.)
2		Natalya Komarova (born 1955)	1 March 2010 – 27 February 2015 (term end)	14 years, 90 days	United Russia	2010
—		Natalya Komarova (born 1955)	27 February 2015 – 13 September 2015	14 years, 90 days	United Russia	Acting
(2)		Natalya Komarova (born 1955)	13 September 2015 – 30 May 2024 (resigned)	14 years, 90 days	United Russia	2015 (Note: Elected by the Duma.); 2020
—		Ruslan Kukharuk (born 1979)	30 May 2024 – 8 September 2024	2 years, 105 days	United Russia	Acting
3		Ruslan Kukharuk (born 1979)	8 September 2024 – present	2 years, 105 days	United Russia	2024
