= Ravil Geniatulin =

Russian politician (born 1955)

- Равиль Гениатулин
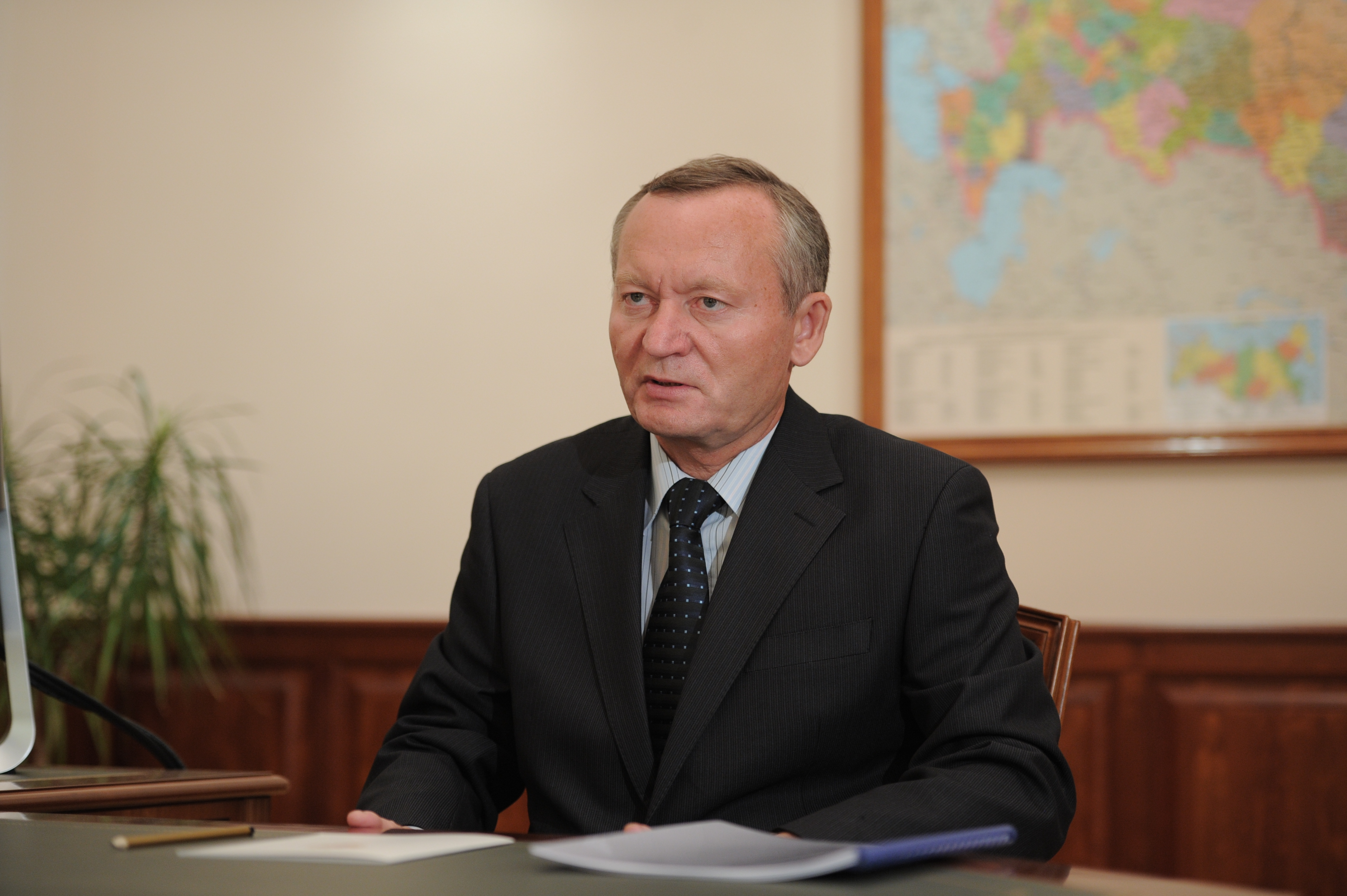
- Geniatulin in 2011

Governor of Zabaykalsky Krai
- In office 1 March 2008 – 1 March 2013
- Preceded by: Position established
- Succeeded by: Konstantin Ilkovsky

Governor of Chita Oblast
- In office 1 February 1996 – 1 March 2008
- Preceded by: Boris Ivanov
- Succeeded by: Position abolished

Mayor of Chita
- In office 24 December 1991 – 1 February 1996

Personal details
- Born: 20 December 1955 (age 70) Chita, RSFSR, Soviet Union

Ravil Faritovich Geniatulin (Russian: Рави́ль Фари́тович Гениату́лин; Tatar: Равил Фәрит улы Гыйниятуллин, romanized: Rawil Fərit uğlı Ğiniətullin; born 20 December 1955 in Chita) was the Governor of Zabaykalsky Krai, Russia, an office he held from 1 February 1996 to 2 March 2013.

== Biography ==
Ravil Geniatulin was born in a mixed family, to Russian mother and Tatar father. From 1973 to 1975, Geniatulin served in the Soviet Army. After the army he studied at Chernyshevsky Chita State Institute. He joined the Communist Party of the USSR and worked as a party activist until 1991. From 1991 to 1996, he was the mayor of Chita, and since 1996—the Governor of Chita Oblast and a member of the Federation Council of Russia. In 2004, Geniatulin was re-elected with more than 60 percent of the vote cast. In October 2007 Geniatulin headed the regional list of the United Russia. On 5 February 2008, he was elected by the majority of the deputies of both Chita Oblast and Agin-Buryat Okrug as the first Governor of Zabaykalsky Krai—a new federal subject formed as a result of the merger of Chita Oblast and Agin-Buryat Autonomous Okrug. He assumed this post on 1 March 2008 when the new federal subject officially came into existence.

== Honours and awards ==
- Order of Military Merit (24 October 2005) - for outstanding contribution to the defence of the Russian Federation
