= Aleksandr Osipov (politician) =

Russian politician (born 1969)

- Александр Осипов
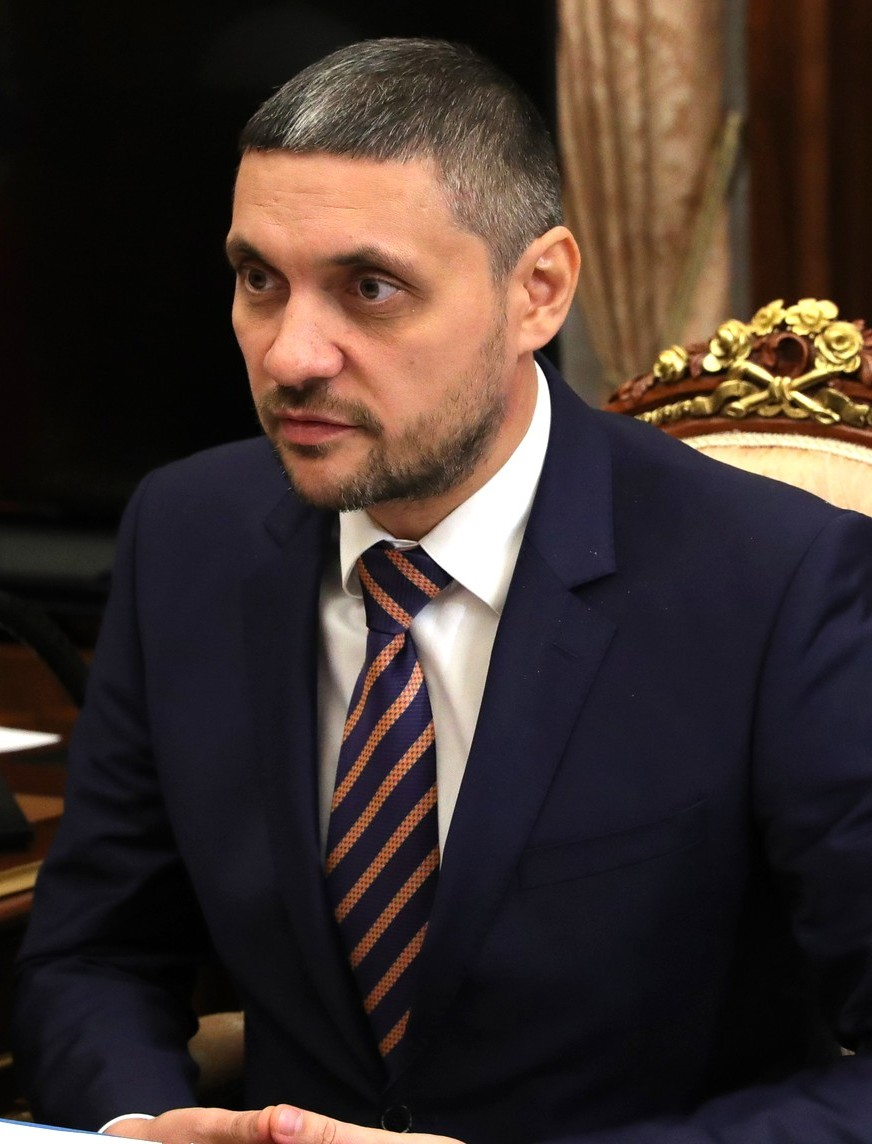
- Osipov in 2018

4th Governor of Zabaykalsky Krai
- Incumbent
- Assumed office 19 September 2019
- Preceded by: Aleksandr Kulakov (acting)

Governor of Zabaykalsky Krai (acting)
- In office 15 October 2018 – 19 September 2019

Personal details
- Born: Aleksandr Mikhailovich Osipov; 28 September 1969 (age 56) Rostov-on-Don, Soviet Union
- Party: Independent
- Spouse: Valentina Vasilyevna
- Children: Natalya Aleksandrovna Osipova

Aleksandr Mikhailovich Osipov (Russian: Александр Михайлович Осипов; born on 28 September 1969), is a Russian statesman. He is currently the 4th Governor of Zabaykalsky Krai from September 19, 2019. He was the acting Governor of the Trans-Baikal Territory from October 25, 2018 to September 19, 2019. Aleksandr Osipov should not be confused with his same full name to the Soviet army officer, who served in the World War II, and was awarded as the Hero of the Soviet Union after his death.

== Biography ==
Aleksandr Osipov was born in Rostov-on-Don on 28 September 1969. His mother is a teacher, and has younger brothers.

=== Labor activity and Education ===
Osipov began to work while still a student.

From 1991 to 1995, he worked as the agent in the Federal Tax Service of Russia.

In 1993, he attended the Rostov Institute of National Economy, majoring in Economic Informatics and Automated Management Systems.

From 1996 to 2000 he was the financial director and chairman of the board of directors of one of the Russian FMCG holdings.

In 2000, he attended the Stavropol State University, majoring in Jurisprudence.

In 2005, he earned the master's degree in Business Administration with a degree in Financial Management at the Academy of National Economy under the Government of the Russia.

From 2001 to 2009 financial director at a number of companies, including the woodworking United Panel Group and the regional division of RAO UES of Russia, the ITERA group of heat and power companies, and the head of the regional business and investment projects department at one of the largest Russian state banks.

In 2009, Osipov headed the expert council of the all-Russian public organization “Business Russia” and became vice president of the organization. Among other things, he was involved in projects to improve the investment climate. In particular, with his expert support, a program was developed to increase the investment attractiveness of the Ulyanovsk Oblast and the formation of an aviation cluster in the region was ongoing. One of Osipov's activities was the creation of a state support system for industrial parks. He became one of the co-founders of the Association of Industrial Parks and became the co-chair of the organization.

From 2009 to 2013 he became a General Director of the Center for Assessment and Audit LLC, also served on the boards of directors of a number of energy companies, including RusHydro and Energy Saving.

On November 26, 2013, he was appointed First Deputy Minister for Development of the Far East, Aleksnder Galushka, one of the co-chairs of Delovaya Rossiya, with whom Osipov collaborated on work in this organization.

From 2013 to 2018, he performed his duties, and was the co-chairman of the joint working group of the Russian Ministry of Eastern Development and the Russian Prosecutor General's Office to reduce administrative barriers to business and protect investors.

=== Governor of Zabaykalsky Krai ===
On October 25, 2018 by decree of the President of Russia, Vladimir Putin, Osipov was appointed as the acting Governor of the Zabaykalsky Krai.

According to the Expert Institute for Social Research, the regular discussion event “Direct Talk”, organized by Alexander Osipov, was recognized as the most effective of the instruments created in the Russian regions for the work of governors to address citizens.

According to VTsIOM, as of April 2019, Alexander Osipov has the highest electoral rating among all newly appointed and about heads of federal subjects of Russia. Its electoral potential is 84%, and more than 75% of the inhabitants of Zabaykalsky Krai are ready to vote for him right now. According to these indicators, Aleksander Osipov confidently leads.

On Unified Voting Day, on September 8, 2019, with a result of 89.61% in the first round of elections of the Governor of the Zabaykalsky Krai, Osipov has won the election as the 4th Governor of Zabaykalsky Krai. He was reelected to the position in the 2024 Zabaykalsy Krai 2024 election.

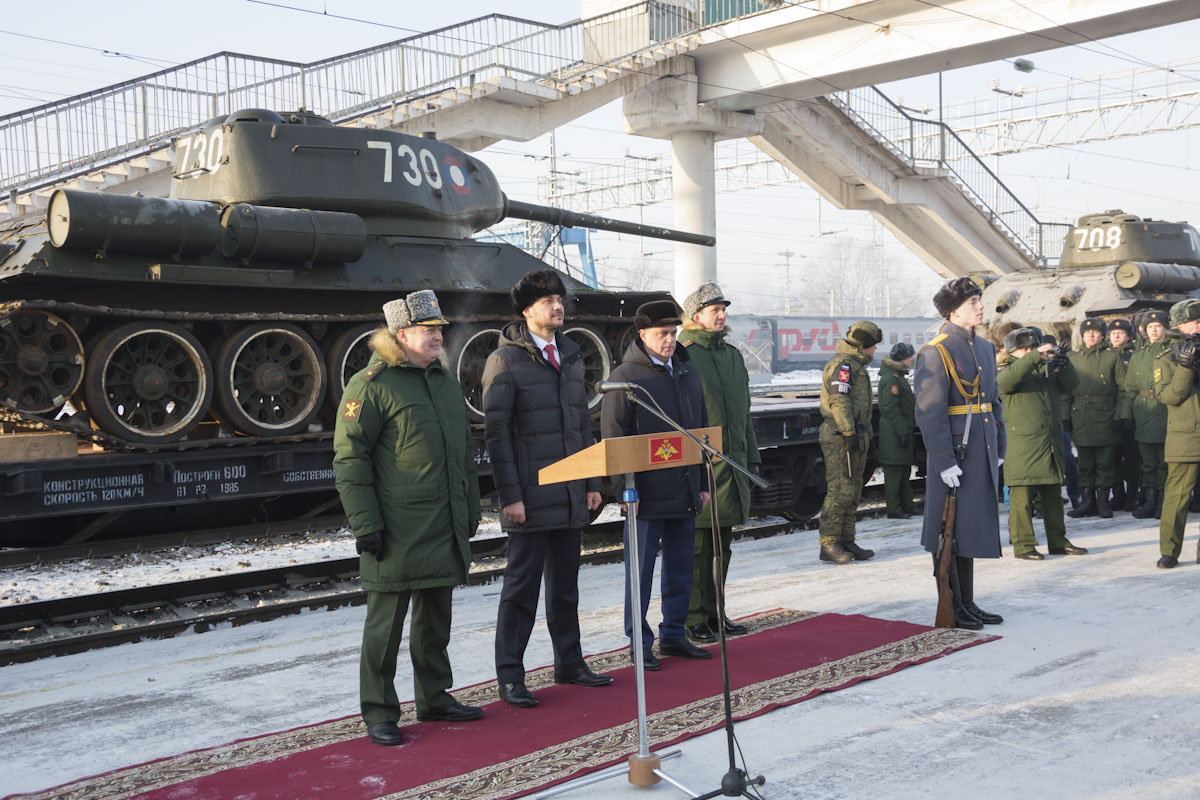
Osipov with Roman Kutuzov in Chita in 13 January 2019

He took the oath in the large hall of the Chita House of Officers and took office on September 19, 2019. On the same day, he extended the powers of the representative of the executive power of the Zaybakalsky Krai government in the Federation Council, to Bair Zhamsuyev.

=== Sanctions ===
In February 2023, the Office of Foreign Assets Control of the United States Department of the Treasury added Osipov to the Specially Designated Nationals and Blocked Persons List due to his involvement in the enforcement of the conscription of Russian citizens in response to the 2022 mobilization order during the Russian invasion of Ukraine.

In April 2023, he was sanctioned by Ukraine due to him being "the head of a state body that supported / encouraged / publicly approved the policy of the Russian Federation aimed at conducting military operations and genocide of the civilian population in Ukraine."

== Family ==
Osipov was married since 1994 to his wife Valentina Vasilyevna, originally from the city of Shakhty, Rostov Region. She was an engineer-economist. Together with her husband, she studied at the Rostov Institute of National Economy, where she met him. They have a daughter, Natalya. Natalya is a student at the Higher School of Economics. She is an experienced dog breeder, and owns a dog business.
