= Konstantin Ilkovsky =

Russian politician

- Константин Ильковский
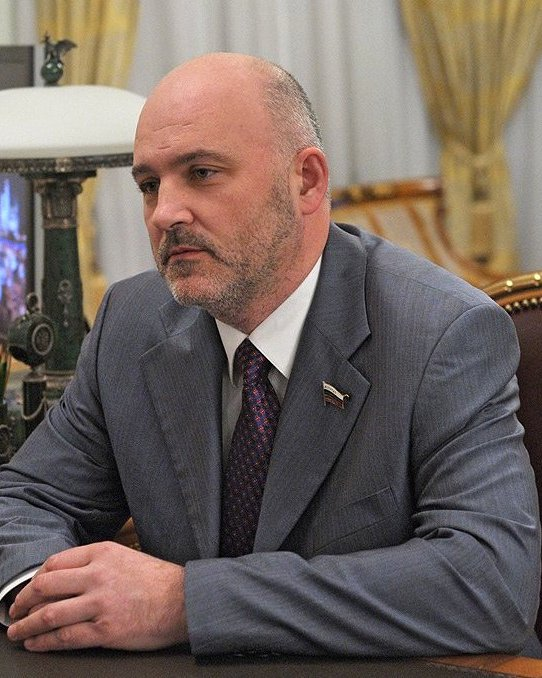
- Ilkovsky in 2013

2nd Governor of Zabaykalsky Krai
- In office 18 September 2013 – 17 February 2016
- Preceded by: Ravil Geniatulin
- Succeeded by: Natalia Zhdanova

Personal details
- Born: January 12, 1964 (age 62) Batagay, Verkhoyansky District, Yakut ASSR, RSFSR, Soviet Union
- Party: A Just Russia
- Profession: Geologist

Konstantin Konstantinovich Ilkovsky (Russian: Константи́н Константи́нович Ильковский) is a Russian politician and Governor of Zabaykalsky Krai between 2013 and 17 February 2016.

In the past, he was an MP of the sixth convocation of the State Duma of the Federal Assembly of the Russian Federation (from December 2011 to February 2013). From 2000 to 2009, General Director of OJSK AK Yakutskenergo and the Deputy Chairperson of the Trustees Councils of Educational Institutions of the Republic of Sakha (Yakutia). He is the Head of the Chess Federation of the Republic.

== Biography ==
Born on January 12, 1964, in the Batagay village, Verkhoyansk district of the Yakut ASSR. His father was a doctor, and mother was a teacher. Parents came to the North, to Batagay, in the early 1960s after graduation from the institutions: his mother graduated from the Kuban Pedagogical Institute, and father - the 1st Leningrad Medical Institute.

During his studies in 1978–79, he worked as a surveyor at a geological prospecting site at the Deputy Mining and Processing Plant.

In 1986, he graduated with honors from the G.V. Plekhanov Leningrad Mining Institute; he got a degree in mining engineering and geology.

After graduating from the institute in 1986, he worked as a district geologist of underground mining at the Zapadny mine, a senior geologist, and a head of a geological exploration expedition of the Deputy GOK. 1986-87 – it was the heyday of the Deputy village. In the village, there were three tin mining mines, with two or three industrial devices on each. Up to 15,000 people lived in the village.

Since 1992 - Chief Engineer of the Deputy's GOK Yakutzoloto. In 1993, because of the accident happened at the power station of the village led to the freezing of the village. People massively left the Deputy village.

In 1994, he graduated from the Academy of National Economy under the Government of the Russian Federation, receiving the qualification of a manager of the highest category. He is MPhil in Economic Sciences.

== In the Yakutia government ==
In 1998-1999 - First Deputy Minister of Industry of the Sakha Republic (Yakutia).

From 1999 to 2000 - First Deputy Head of the Presidential Administration of Yakutia.

== Yakutskenergo. RAO UES of the East ==
From 2000 to September 2009 - General Director of OAO AK Yakutskenergo, located in Yakutsk.

From December 29, 2002, to March 2, 2008 - deputy of the state assembly (Il Tumen) of the Sakha Republic of the 3rd convocation. He was elected in the Usti-May district No. 63.

From March 2, 2008, to December 14, 2011 - deputy of the state assembly (Il Tumen) of the Sakha Republic of the 4th convocation. He was elected in the Kobya-Verkhoyansk district No. 30.

With the direct participation of Ilkovsky, significant projects of the Yakut energy system were implemented and began to be implemented - an optimization program of local energy, an increase in the share of centralized electricity and heat supply, the construction of a high-voltage 220 kV Suntar-Olekminsk line to provide power supply for VS-TO.

In September 2009, Ivan Blagodyr, Director General of Energy Systems of the East, appointed Oleg Tarasov as Director General of Yakutskenergo, and Konstantin Ilkovsky as his adviser.

From 2009 to 2011 - Advisor to the General Director of JSC RAO Energy Systems of the East, Ivan Blagodyr.

In 2010 - Chairman of the Board of Directors of OJSC Sakhaenergo.

In 2011 - Director of Yakutskoe LLC.

== MP of the State Duma of Russian Federation ==
On December 4, 2011, at the elections to the State Duma of the sixth convocation, Ilkovsky ran for the regional list of the party "A Just Russia", was the number one in the regional group 5 (Republic of Buryatia, Zabaykalsky Krai). He was elected to the State Duma and, was a member of the "A Just Russia: Motherland \ Pensioners \ Life" fraction. He was also a member of the inter-factional group “Baikal”, which was formed of MPS from the Zabaykalsky Krai, Buryatia and the Irkutsk Region.

In September 2012, he condemned the decision on the parliamentary mandate deprivation of the same party member Gennady Gudkov.

Then in September 2012, he announced his intention to fight for the post of governor of the Zabaykalsky Krai.

He left the State Duma before his mandate termination, after his appointment on March 1, 2013, as interim governor of the Zabaykalsky Krai. His mandate was transferred to Irinchey Matkhanov.

== Governor of the Zabaykalsky Krai ==
Since March 1, 2013, the Acting Governor of the Zabaykalsky Krai has been appointed by decree of the President of the Russian Federation Vladimir Putin.

September 8, 2013, won the election of the governor of the Zabaykalsky Krai, gaining 71.63% of the votes. September 18, he officially took the office.

The governorship of Konstantin Ilkovsky was marked by a number of scandals: the region is in a pre-bankrupt state, the regional budget deficit of 5.5 billion rubles, public sector employees wages are regularly delayed, 115 thousand hectares of land in the Zabaykalsky Krai planned to transfer for 49 years years old for rent to a Chinese Company.

February 17, 2016, Russian President Vladimir Putin accepted the resignation of Konstantin Ilkovsky upon his own request. The resignation of the governor was associated with poor financial discipline, as well as due to the failure of the region to fulfill its obligations to resettle citizens from emergency housing.

During his term as governor, Zabaykalsky Krai dropped from 39th place (in 2013) in the ranking of regional success to 85th place in 2015.

== Awards and titles ==
- Honored Worker of the National Economy of the Republic of Sakha (Yakutia)
- Laureate of the State Prize of the Republic of Sakha (Yakutia) in the field of material production
- Honorary Citizen of Ust-Maysky District (2006)
- Honorary Citizen Ust-Yansky District (2006)
