= Zhuravlikha =

Zhuravlikha Журавлиха
- Selo
- Location within Altai Krai Location within Russia
- Coordinates: 53°46′N 84°14′E
- Country: Russia
- Region: Altai Krai
- District: Pervomaysky District
- Time zone: UTC+7:00

Zhuravlikha (Russian: Журавлиха) is a rural locality (a selo) and the administrative center of Zhuravlikhinsky Selsoviet, Pervomaysky District, Altai Krai, Russia. The population was 880 as of 2013. There are 6 streets.

== Geography ==
Zhuravlikha is located 62 km southeast of Novoaltaysk (the district's administrative centre) by road. Talovka is the nearest rural locality.
