= Yuri Valyaev =

Russian politician (born 1959)

- Юрий Валяев
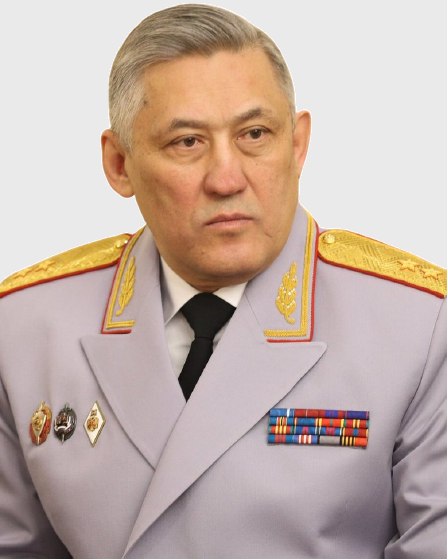

Senator from the Jewish Autonomous Oblast
- Incumbent
- Assumed office 22 September 2020
- Preceded by: Rostislav Goldstein

Personal details
- Born: Yuri Valyaev; 18 April 1959 (age 67) Zhuravlikha, Pervomaysky District, Altai Krai, Altai Krai, Russian Soviet Federative Socialist Republic, Soviet Union
- Party: United Russia
- Education: Omsk Academy of the Ministry of Internal Affairs

Yuri Konstantinovich Valyaev (Russian: Юрий Константинович Валяев; born 18 April 1959) is a Russian politician serving as a senator from the Jewish Autonomous Oblast since 22 September 2020.

== Career ==
Yuri Valyaev was born on 18 April 1959 in Zhuravlikha, Pervomaysky District, Altai Krai. In 1980, he graduated from the Omsk Academy of the Ministry of Internal Affairs. From 1980 to 1981, he served as an Inspector of the Criminal Investigation Department. From 1989 onward, he worked at the Internal Affairs Directorate of Barnaul. From 2002 to 2011, Valyaev served as a Minister of the Interior of the Republic of Altai. Afterward, he was the Head of the Main Directorate of the Ministry of Internal Affairs of Russia for the Perm Krai. On 22 September 2020, he was appointed the senator from the Jewish Autonomous Oblast.

== Sanctions ==
Yuri Valyaev is under personal sanctions introduced by the European Union, the United Kingdom, the United States, Canada, Switzerland, Australia, Ukraine, New Zealand, for ratifying the decisions of the "Treaty of Friendship, Cooperation and Mutual Assistance between the Russian Federation and the Donetsk People's Republic and between the Russian Federation and the Luhansk People's Republic" and providing political and economic support for Russia's annexation of Ukrainian territories.
