= Valentina Bronevich =

Russian politician

- Валентина Броневич
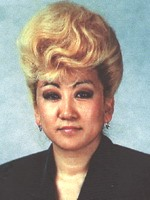

2nd Head of Administration of Koryak Autonomous Okrug
- In office 17 November 1996 – 16 December 2000
- Preceded by: Sergey Lyoushkin
- Succeeded by: Vladimir Loginov

Personal details
- Born: 25 January 1956 (age 70) Sopochnoye, Koryak National Okrug, Kamchatka Oblast, RSFSR, Soviet Union
- Education: Irkutsk State University

Valentina Tadeyevna Bronevich (Russian: Валентина Тадеевна Броневич, born 1956) is a Russian politician from Kamchatka. She was elected Head of Administration of Koryak autonomy in the Far East in 1996, becoming Russia's first female governor.

== Early life ==
Valentina Bronevich was born in January 1956 in the village of Sopochny (modern Tigilsky District of Kamchatka Krai) and comes from a mixed family. Her mother was Itelmen and she considers herself belonging to this ethnic group. At the age of 5 she moved to Ust-Khairyuzovo, beginning education in a secondary boarding school in Tigil. Graduated from the Faculty of Law of Irkutsk State University.

In 1978–83 she worked as a lawyer for the Kamchatka Regional Bar Association. In 1983–87 she was Judge of the Tigil District Court, Deputy Chairman of the Court of the Koryak Autonomous District, in 1987–90 — Chairman of the Koryak District Executive Committee. In 1991 — head of the department for indigenous peoples issues of the Kamchatka Regional Executive Committee, in 1992–94 – Senior Legal Advisor of the legal group "Kamchatka Forest", 1994–96 — Chairman of the Kamchatka Regional Election Commission.

== Governorship ==
In September 1996, Bronevich was registered as a candidate for the governor of Koryak Autonomous Okrug. She was supported by the "Reforms — New Deal" movement and the People's Patriotic Union of Russia, backed by CPRF. On 17 November 1996, she won in the first round with 47.1% of the vote.

Her election to the post of governor happened when the federal government relinquished the obligation to provide life support for the Far North, allocating only 20% of the required funds for the Koryak AO. Because of this, the once strong fish factories and collective farms went bankrupt, many specialists left the region. There were serious problems with the supply of fuel. Bronevich succeeded in reforming the assignment of “small enterprises” to the villages, which contained the social sphere in exchange for quotas. Under her administration, Koryakia's fish processing enterprises fully mastered the crab quotas on their own; the pollock harvest in 1999 increased many times, which brought significant "fish money" to the budget. This made it possible not only not to ask for subsidies from the center, but also to invest in the "Northern delivery" more than 81 million rubles from its own budget and 25 million rubles from extra-budgetary funds. In 1999 Koryakia's own revenues exceeded financial assistance from the federal budget for the first time, and the regional budget deficit has decreased by 18% in three years. A non-state pension fund was created, which made the payment of preferential pensions to representatives of the indigenous peoples of the North, and since 2000, the same payments have been made to the recipients of the minimum social pension. However, in December 2000 Bronevich lost reelection to Vladimir Loginov.

== Recent activity ==
In 2002–05 — general director of "Bilyukai" ethnocultural center, Deputy Head of Administration of Penzhinsky District. In 2003, she ran for the State Duma, but lost the elections. In 2005–07 — Vice Governor of the Koryak Autonomous Okrug, and later (after Koryakia's subjugation by Kamchatka Krai) Minister for Koryak Affairs in the Government of Kamchatka Krai. Since 2011 she is Deputy Chairman of the Government of Kamchatka Krai. From 25 May 2016 to 25 May 2021, she was the Commissioner for Human Rights in the region.
