= Samara State University of Economics =

Russian public university

Samara State Economic University
- Самарский государственный экономический университет
- Former names: Middle Volga Planning and Economic Institute; Srednevolzhsk Planning Institute; Samara Institute of Economics; Samara State Academy of Economics
- Type: Public university
- Established: 1931
- Location: Ulitsa Sovetskoy Armii, 141, Samara, Samara Oblast, 443090, Russia; 53.2163°N 50.2113°E
- Campus: Urban
- Language: Russian
- Website: www.sseu.ru/en

University rankings

Regional – Overall
- QS Emerging Europe and Central Asia: 351-400 (2022)

Samara State Economic University (SSEU) (Russian: Самарский государственный экономический университет) is a public university located in Samara, Russia that was founded in 1931.

== History ==
Samara State University of Economics was established in 1931 as the Middle Volga Planning and Economic Institute by the Decree of the USSR Council of People's Commissars when planners identified an urgent need to train a new generation of industrial and technical experts to foster industrialization in the Middle Volga region covering the areas of Samara, Ulyanovsk, Penza, Orenburg regions and Mordovia.

From 1931 to 1955, the university trained economists and planners in the specialties "Economics of Industry" and "Economics of Agriculture" before adding specialties in "Supply economics", "Labor economics", "Accounting" and "Planning of national economy" during the 1950s, 1960s and 1970s. During this time it expanded the campus with academic buildings, gymnasiums, a hostel, and a food production facility. In the 1970s, the university employed up to 200 full-time researchers, more than 100 part-time teachers, and 200 postgraduate students.

After starting as the Middle Volga Planning and Economic Institute, it was renamed the Srednevolzhsk Planning Institute, then the Samara Institute of Economics in 1991, the Samara State Academy of Economics in 1994, before becoming the Samara State University of Economics in 2005.

Since the 1990s, the university has added the following specialties:

- Industrial and Economic, Accounting and Economic, Financial and Economic (opened in 1993)
- Department of Logistics Economy (opened in 1993)
- Agribusiness (opened in 1994)
- Economics (the multilevel training of bachelors in "Economics," opened in 1994)
- Faculty of Economics and Law (opened in 1995, now the Institute of Law)
- Masters in "Economics" (1999)
- Socio-economic Education (2004)

The university teaches 22 specialties, 13 bachelor's degrees, and 5 master's degrees with about ten thousand students each year under about 500 instructors at the university, 70% of whom have academic degrees and titles.
