= Natalia Zhdanova =

Russian politician

- Наталья Жданова
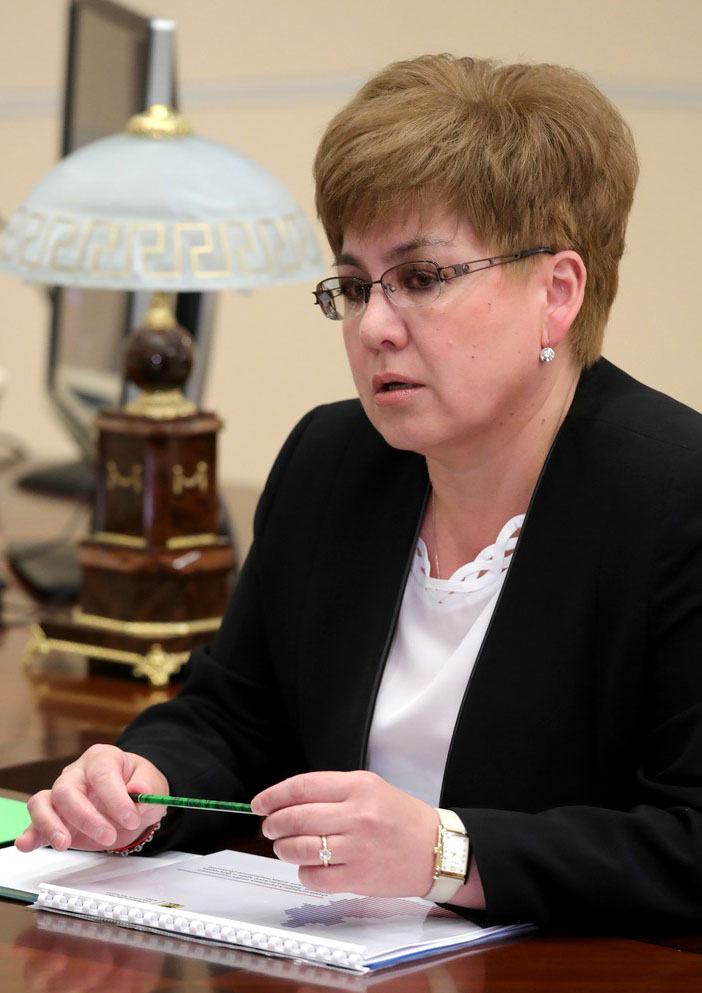
- Zhdanova in 2017

3rd Governor of Zabaykalsky Krai
- In office 18 February 2016 – 25 October 2018
- Preceded by: Konstantin Ilkovsky
- Succeeded by: Aleksandr Kulakov (acting)

Personal details
- Born: Natalia Nikolaevna Zhdanova; 6 February 1964 (age 62) Chita, Chitinsky District, Chita Oblast, RSFSR, Soviet Union
- Party: United Russia
- Education: Transbaikal State University
- Profession: Linguist
- Awards: Medal of the Order "For Merit to the Fatherland"

Natalia Nikolaevna Zhdanova (Russian: Наталья Николаевна Жданова; born 6 February 1964) is a Russian politician and Governor of Zabaykalsky Krai from February 2016 to October 2018. She resigned after receiving criticism for her handling of the region's social and economic difficulties and for not being able to maintain public support.
