= Head of administration =

Head of administration (Russian: Глава администрации, Glava administratsii) is one of the official titles for appointed or elected head of a local government in Russian Federation. In many federal districts, regions, and cities, the position as head of administration is the equivalent to that of the mayor, governor, or the head of local government.

== History ==
The post of head of the administration of a region was established in August 1991 by President Boris Yeltsin. The heads of administrations replaced the Soviet-era chairmen of the executive committees of the councils of people's deputies. The first of them was the head of the Krasnodar Krai Administration Vasily Dyakonov on August 23, 1991. In 1991–93, the heads of the regional administrations were nominated by the President of Russia, and approved by the regional legislature. In 1994–96, heads of administrations were appointed by the President of Russia on the recommendation of the Prime Minister of Russia; the consent of regional deputies was not required. From 1995/96 to 2005, the heads of regional administrations were elected by direct vote.

The 1993 Constitution gave the regions the right to determine the title of the highest official in the region. As a result, since 1994 the title of the head of administration has been gradually supplanted by the more prestigious title of governor. In colloquial use, heads of administrations began to be called "governors" as early as 1991–92, despite objections that this word should not be used, because there are no governorates in the country.

== Current Usage ==
Currently, the title of head of administration instead of governor is used only in one region of Russia: Tambov Oblast. In the Charter of Krasnodar Krai the head of the region is designated as "head of administration (governor)", which allows the use of either of the two titles.
