= Natalya Komarova =

Russian politician

- Наталья Комарова
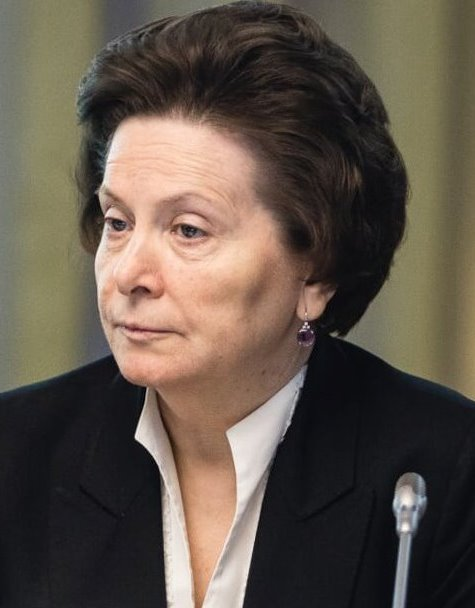
- Komarova in 2018

Senator from Khanty–Mansi Autonomous Okrug
- Incumbent
- Assumed office 8 September 2024
- Preceded by: Eduard Isakov

Governor of Khanty–Mansi Autonomous Okrug
- In office 1 March 2010 – 30 May 2024
- Preceded by: Alexander Filipenko
- Succeeded by: Ruslan Kukharuk

Chair of the State Duma Natural Resources Committee
- In office 2004 – 1 March 2010

Member of the State Duma
- In office 17 December 2001 – 1 March 2010

First Deputy Governor of Yamalo-Nenets
- In office 2000 – 17 December 2001

Mayor of Novy Urengoy
- In office 1994–2000

Personal details
- Born: October 21, 1955 (age 70) Yazvo, Russian SFSR, Soviet Union (now Pskov Oblast, Russia)
- Party: United Russia
- Children: 2 daughters
- Profession: Engineer, economist, politician

Natalya Vladimirovna Komarova (Russian: Наталья Владимировна Комарова; born 21 October 1955) is a Russian politician who has served as Senator from Khanty-Mansi since September 2024. She previously served as Governor of Khanty–Mansi Autonomous Okrug from 2010 to 2024. She previously served as in State Duma between 2001 and 2010, where for six years she headed the powerful Natural Resources Committee. Prior to that, she held a number of statewide and local positions in Khanty-Mansi and Yamalo-Nenets.

A member of United Russia, she remained the only woman to lead a federal subject in Russia until her resignation in 2024.

== Education and career ==
Natalya Komarova is a graduate of the Kommunarsk Mining-Metallurgical Institute (now Donbas State Technical University). In 1980 she moved from the Donbas to Novy Urengoy, where she became lieutenant inspector.

In 1992 Komarova took office as Deputy Mayor of Novy Urengoy and became the Mayor of the regionally significant town two years later. She was chosen by the Governor of Yamalo-Nenets, Yuri Neyolov, as his deputy in 2000. In that capacity, she headed the Regional Economic Council. During those years, Komarova also served as an educator and docent of the Yamalsky Oil and Gas Institute, a department within Tyumen State Oil and Gas University.

In December 2001, Komarova filled a vacated seat in the State Duma, where she quickly gained influence and, in 2004, was chosen as Chair of the Committee on Natural Resources and Management, one year after being elected to a full term in the Duma. She was re-elected in 2007.

On 8 February 2010, Komarova's credentials were endorsed by the State Duma and Russian President Dmitry Medvedev to be appointed Governor of Khanty-Mansia, shortly after which she took office. She successfully ran for the position in 2015 after Russia re-adopted gubernatorial elections, a system that was previously abandoned ten years prior. Komarova was re-elected to another term in 2020.

Despite not being involved in decisions made by the federal government, as a prominent Russian political figure, Komarova has been placed on the sanctions list of Ukraine and the United States amidst her country's 2022 invasion of Ukraine.

Komarova resigned on 30 May 2024 due to the transfer to another position. The same day, President Vladimir Putin appointed mayor of Tyumen Ruslan Kukharuk acting Governor.
