= Maria Kostyuk =

Russian politician

- Мария Костюк
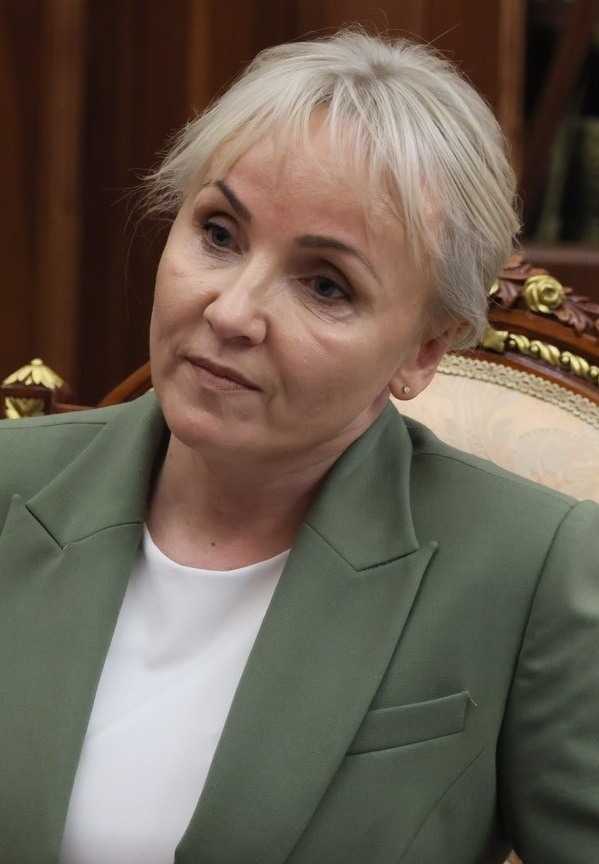
- Kostyuk in 2025

Governor of Jewish Autonomous Oblast
- Incumbent
- Assumed office 23 September 2025; Acting: 5 November 2024 – 23 September 2025
- Preceded by: Rostislav Goldstein

Personal details
- Born: March 2, 1977 (age 49) Smidovich, Jewish Autonomous Oblast, Russian SFSR, Soviet Union
- Party: United Russia
- Children: 2
- Education: Birobidzhan State Pedagogical Institute (2000), Khabarovsk State University of Economics and Law (2013)
- Profession: Educator, politician
- Awards: Russian Federation Presidential Certificate of Honour

Maria Fyodorovna Kostyuk (Russian: Мария Фёдоровна Костюк; born 3 March 1977) is a Russian politician serving as governor of Jewish Autonomous Oblast since September 2025. She served as acting governor from November 2024 to September 2025.

== Biography ==
Maria Kostyuk was born in the urban locality of Smidovich, Jewish Autonomous Oblast, in 1977.

In 2000, she graduated from the Birobidzhan State Pedagogical Institute with degrees in philology and history. In 2013, she graduated from the Khabarovsk State University of Economics and Law with a degree in public administration.

From 2000-03, she worked at a Smidovich secondary school as a teacher and deputy head teacher. From July 2003 to September 2009 she served at the Smidovichsky District administration. From 2009 to 2017 she served at the Birobidzhan city hall as head of department, deputy head of city hall and deputy mayor, contiguously. From 2017 to 2019, she served as assistant to the Russian Federation Senator from Jewish Autonomous Oblast Rostislav Goldstein. From 2019 to 2023, she served at the Jewish Autonomous Oblast government.

She was a campaign trusted person of Vladimir Putin during his 2024 presidential campaign.

On 5 November 2024, following Governor Goldstein's resignation, President Putin appointed Kostyuk acting governor of Jewish Autonomous Oblast.
