= Zabaykalsky Krai =

First-level administrative division of Russia

Zabaykalsky Krai Забайкальский край (Russian)
- Krai
- Flag Coat of arms

- Coordinates: 54°00′N 118°00′E
- Country: Russia
- Federal district: Far Eastern
- Economic region: Far Eastern
- Established: 1 March 2008
- Administrative center: Chita

Government
  - Body: Legislative Assembly
  - Governor: Aleksandr Osipov

Area
  - Total: 431,892 km^{2} (166,754 sq mi)
  - Rank: 12th

Population (2021 census)
  - Total: 1,004,125
  - Estimate (2018): 1,072,806
  - Rank: 50th
  - Density: 2.32494/km^{2} (6.02158/sq mi)
  - Urban: 69.1%
  - Rural: 30.9%

GDP (nominal, 2024)
  - Total: ₽718 billion (US$8.43 billion)
  - Per capita: ₽726,780 (US$8,528.18)
- Time zone: UTC+9 (MSK+6)
- ISO 3166 code: RU-ZAB
- License plates: 75, 80
- OKTMO ID: 76000000
- Official languages: Russian
- Website: http://www.забайкальскийкрай.рф

Zabaykalsky Krai (Note: UK: /zəbaɪˈkælski kraɪ/, US: /zəbaɪˈkɑːlski kraɪ/; Russian: Забайкальский край, romanized: Zabaykalʹskiy kray, IPA: [zəbɐjˈkalʲskʲɪj kraj]; lit. 'Transbaikal territory') is a federal subject of Russia (a krai), located in the Russian Far East. Its administrative center is Chita. As of the 2021 Census, the population was 1,004,125.

The krai was created on 1 March 2008, as a result of a merger of Chita Oblast and Agin-Buryat Autonomous Okrug after a referendum held on the issue on 11 March 2007. In 2018, the krai became part of the Far Eastern Federal District.

== Geography ==
The krai is located within the historical region of Transbaikalia (Dauria) and has extensive international borders with China (Inner Mongolia and Heilongjiang) (998 km) and Mongolia (Dornod Province, Khentii Province and Selenge Province) (868 km); its internal borders are with Irkutsk Oblast and Amur Oblast, as well as with Buryatia and the Sakha Republic. The Khentei-Daur Highlands are located at the southwestern end. The Ivan-Arakhley Lake System is a group of lakes lying west of Chita.

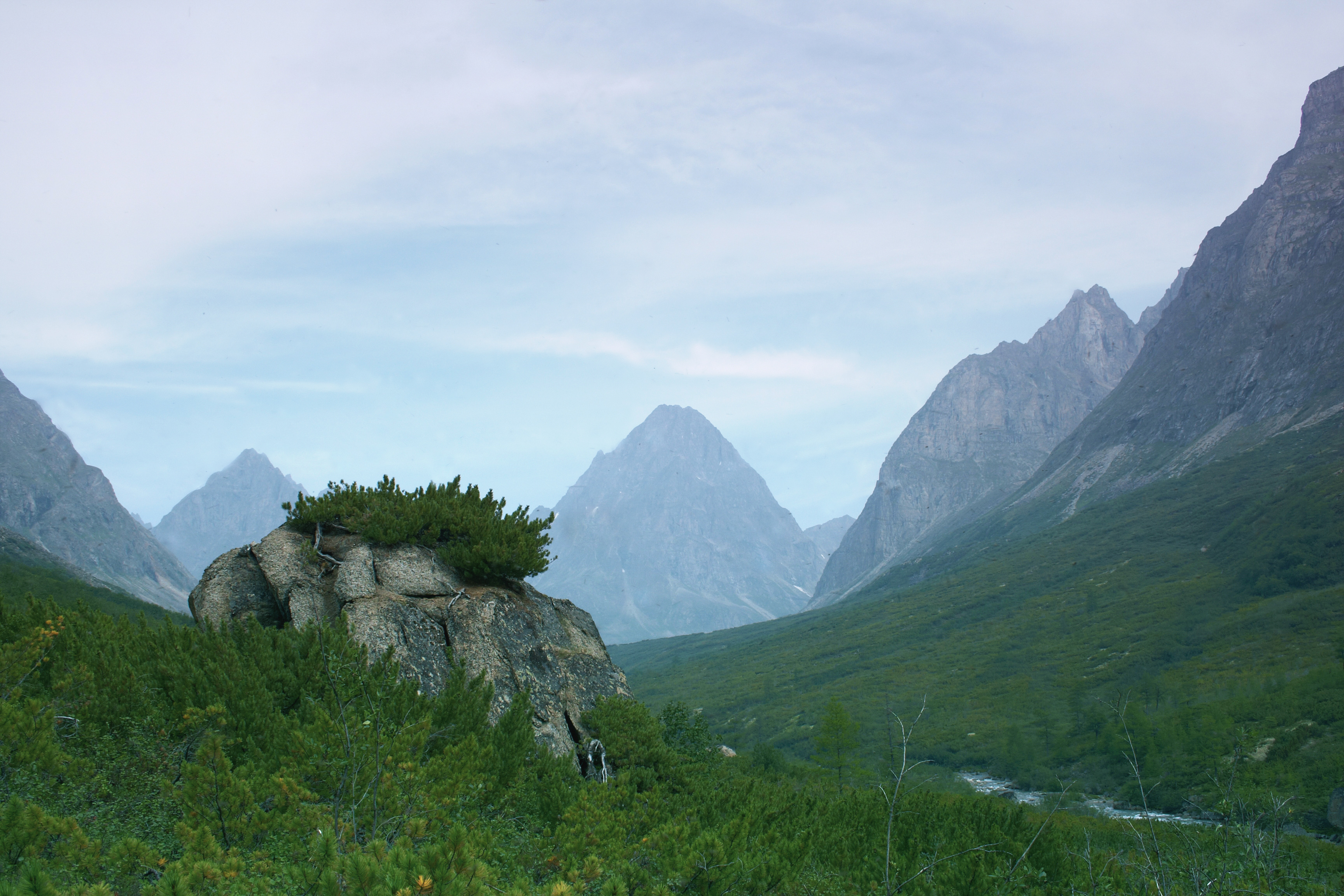
Upper Middle River Sakukan, Kalarsky District.

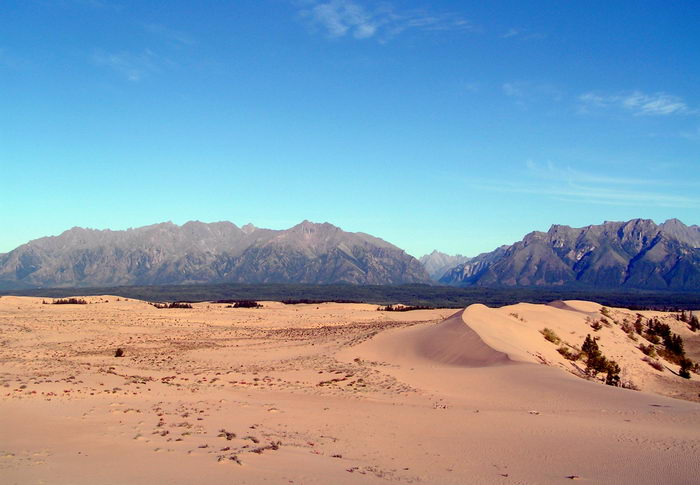
The Chara Sands, a desert like area in the middle of Siberia, as seen near Novaya Chara. The Kodar Mountains lie in the background.

== History ==
The first traces of human presence in the area dates to 35 to 150 thousand years ago. Early evidence was found on the surface of ancient river gravels Gyrshelunki (tributary of the Khilok River) near the city of Chita, near Ust-Menza on the Chikoy River.

Based on toponyms, Zabaykalsky might have once been inhabited by a Yeniseian people group who spoke a non-documented, extinct language.

Mongolic-related Slab Grave cultural monuments are found in Baikal territory. The territory of Zabaykalsky Krai has been governed by the Xiongnu Empire (209 BC-93 CE) and Mongolian Xianbei state (93-234), Rouran Khaganate (330–555), Mongol Empire (1206–1368) and Northern Yuan (1368–1691). Medieval Mongol tribes like Merkit, Tayichiud, Jalairs and Khamag Mongols inhabited in the krai. In the 17th century, some or all of Mongolic-speaking Daurs lived along the Shilka, upper Amur, and on the Bureya River. They thus gave their name to the region of Dauria, also called Transbaikal, now the area of Russia east of Lake Baikal. Today Buryat-Mongols remained in the territory of the krai.

Preliminary work on the unification of the Chita Oblast and Agin-Buryat Autonomous Okrug was started at the level of regional authorities in April 2006. The governor of Chita Oblast Ravil Geniatulin, mayor of the Agin-Buryat Autonomous Okrug Bair Zhamsuyev, head of the regional parliament Anatoly Romanov, and Dashi Dugarov sent a letter to the president of Russia, Vladimir Putin, and on 17 November 2006, he supported the initiative.

A referendum on unification took place on 11 March 2007. In Chita Oblast, "yes" was the predominant answer to the following question:

Do you agree that the Chita Oblast and Agin-Buryat Autonomous Okrug merged into a new entity of the Russian Federation - Zabaykalsky Krai, which included Agin-Buryat Autonomous Okrug will be an administrative-territorial unit with special status, defined by the charter of the province in accordance with the legislation of the Russian Federation?

In Chita Oblast, 90.29% (535,045 voters) of the voters voted for the union versus – 8.89% (52,698 voters) who voted against it. 72.82% of the electorate participated. In the Aga Buryat Autonomous Region 94% (38,814 voters) voted for the union versus – 5.16% (2129 voters). 82.95% of the electorate voters participated.

On 23 July 2007, Russian president Vladimir Putin signed a federal constitutional law "On Establishment in the Russian Federation of a new subject of the Russian Federation in the merger of Chita Oblast and Agin-Buryat Autonomous Okrug", adopted by the State Duma on 5 July 2007. and approved by the Federation Council on 11 July 2007.

== Economy ==
Large companies in the region include the Priargunskoe Mining and Chemical Association, Territorial Generating Company №14, Novo-Shirokinsky mine, Kharanorskaya State District Power Plant, Kharanorskiy coal mine.

== Government ==
Ravil Geniatulin, the governor of Chita Oblast, was elected Governor of Zabaykalsky Krai on 5 February 2008, by the majority of the deputies of both Chita Oblast Duma and Agin-Buryat Autonomous Okrug Duma. He assumed the post on 1 March 2008. United Russia candidate Natalia Zhdanova was elected governor with 54% of the vote on 18 September 2016.

== Demographics ==
Historical population
Year	Pop.	±%
1926	2,934,000	—
1959	1,036,387	−64.7%
1970	1,144,918	+10.5%
1979	1,233,435	+7.7%
1989	1,377,975	+11.7%
2002	1,155,346	−16.2%
2010	1,107,107	−4.2%
2021	1,004,125	−9.3%
Source: Census data

Population: 1,004,125 (2021 census); 1,107,107 (2010 census); 1,155,346 (2002 census); 1,377,975 (1989 Soviet census).

According to the 2021 Census, Russians made up 89.2% of the population while Buryats were 7.4%. Other significant groups were Armenians (0.3%), Tatars (0.3%), Ukrainians (0.2%), Kyrgyz (0.2%) and Uzbeks (0.2%). 118,477 people were registered from administrative databases, and could not declare an ethnicity. It is estimated that the proportion of ethnicities in this group is the same as that of the declared group.

Ethnicity	2002 census		2010 census		2021 census	
Ethnicity	Number	%	Number	%	Number	%
Russians	1,037,502	90.0%	977,499	89.9%	790,207	89.2%
Buryats	70,457	6.1%	73,941	6.8%	65,590	7.4%
Armenians	3,594	0.3%	3,943	0.4%	2,651	0.3%
Tatars	8,159	0.7%	5,857	0.5%	2,489	0.3%
Others	32,941	2.9%	25,886	2.4%	24,711	2.8%
Ethnicity not stated	2,693	–	19,981	–	118,477	–

=== Settlements ===
Largest cities or towns in Zabaykalsky Krai 2010 Russian Census
Rank		Administrative Division	Pop.
1	Chita	Chitinsky District	324,444
2	Krasnokamensk	Krasnokamensky District	55,666
3	Borzya	Borzinsky District	31,379
4	Petrovsk-Zabaykalsky	Petrovsk-Zabaykalsky District	18,549
5	Nerchinsk	Nerchinsky District	14,959
6	Shilka	Shilkinsky District	13,947
7	Chernyshevsk	Chernyshevsky District	13,359
8	Mogocha	Mogochinsky District	13,258
9	Karymskoye	Karymsky District	13,037
10	Baley	Baleysky District	12,533

Vital statistics for 2024:

- Births: 9,972 (10.2 per 1,000)
- Deaths: 14,073 (14.3 per 1,000)

Total fertility rate (2024):
1.58 children per woman

Life expectancy (2021):
Total — 66.82 years (male — 62.28, female — 71.54)

== Religion ==
Religion in Zabaykalsky Krai as of 2012 (Sreda Arena Atlas)
Spiritual but not religious	28%
Russian Orthodoxy	24.6%
Atheism and irreligion	17.1%
Other and undeclared	16.8%
Buddhism	6.3%
Other Christians	5.6%
Other Orthodox	1.6%

As of a 2012 survey, 25% of the population of Zabaykalsky Krai adheres to the Russian Orthodox Church, 6.25% to Buddhism, 6% declares to be generically unaffiliated Christian (excluding Protestant churches), 2% is an Orthodox Christian believer without belonging to any church or being member of other (non-Russian) Orthodox churches. In addition, 28% of the population declares to be "spiritual but not religious", 17% to be atheist, and 16.15% follows other religion or did not give an answer to the survey.

== See also ==
- List of Chairmen of the Legislative Assembly of Zabaikalsky Krai
- Pallas Mountain
