= List of Moscow State Institute of International Relations alumni =

This is a list of Moscow State Institute of International Relations (MGIMO-University) alumni.

== Alumni ==
=== Heads of state or government ===
- Petar Mladenov, former President of Bulgaria
- Ilham Aliyev, President of Azerbaijan
- Kassym-Jomart Tokayev, President of Kazakhstan
- Kirsan Ilyumzhinov, President of Kalmykia (a region of Russia)
- Andrey Lukanov, former Prime Minister of Bulgaria
- Zhan Videnov, former Prime Minister of Bulgaria

=== Ministers, diplomats and politicians ===
- Irina Bokova, former Ambassador of Bulgaria to France, Director-General of UNESCO
- Sergei Lavrov, minister of Foreign Affairs of Russia, former Russia's ambassador to the United Nations
- Andrei Kozyrev, minister of foreign affairs of Russia
- Maroš Šefčovič, Vice-President of the European Commission and European Commissioner for Inter-Institutional Relations and Administration (2009 - ), former Slovak Permanent Representative to the European Union (2004-2009)
- Georgiy Mamedov, Ambassador of Russia to Canada
- Pulat Abdullayev, former Ambassador of Russia to Cameroon
- Anatoly Adamishin, former Ambassador to Italy, first deputy Foreign Minister
- Nikolay Afanasevsky, former Ambassador to Belgium and France
- Aleksandr Avdeyev, former Ambassador of Russia to France, Minister for Culture of Russia
- Alexei Bogaturov, International Trends founder and first editor-in-chief, Distinguished Scholar of Russia
- Valentin Bogomazov, former Ambassador to Ecuador, Peru
- Roza Chemeris, member of the State Duma
- Aleksandr Churilin, Ambassador to Romania (2006-2011)
- Vitaly Churkin, former Permanent Representative of the Russian Federation to the United Nations
- Vyacheslav Dolgov, former Ambassador to Australia, Belarus
- Anatoly Dryukov, former Ambassador to Singapore, India, Armenia
- Yuri Fedotov, former Ambassador of Russia to the United Kingdom, Executive Director of the UNODC
- Štefan Füle, European Commissioner for Enlargement and European Neighbourhood Policy, former Czech Minister of European Affairs and Czech Ambassador to the NATO
- Oleg Gordievsky, KGB officer and defector
- Vladimir Grinin, Ambassador to Germany, Switzerland
- Olga Ivanova, Ambassador to Mauritius
- Nikolai Kozyrev, Ambassador to Ireland (1991-1998)
- Miroslav Jenča, Slovakian diplomat
- Sergei Kirpichenko, Ambassador to United Arab Emirates (1998-2000), Libya (2000-2004), Syria (2006-2011), Egypt (2011-2019)
- Oleg Krivonogov, Ambassador to Luxembourg (1997-2001)
- Ján Kubiš, former minister of foreign affairs of Slovakia (2006-2009), former Organization for Security and Co-operation in Europe secretary general
- Eduard Kukan, Member of European Parliament (2009-), former minister of foreign affairs of Slovakia (1994, 1998-2006)
- Yuri Kuplyakov, former Ambassador to Nigeria
- Miroslav Lajčák, Minister of Foreign and European Affairs of Slovak Republic (2009-2010, 2012- ), former President of the United Nations General Assembly (2017), former Managing Director for Russia, Eastern Neighbourhood and the Western Balkans in the EU's External Action Service (2010-2012), High Representative for Bosnia and Herzegovina
- Iurie Leancă, diplomat and Foreign Minister of Moldova
- Nikolai Leonov, politician, KGB
- Alexander Losyukov, former Ambassador to New Zealand
- Vladimir Malygin, Ambassador to Malta
- Sergei Martynov, minister of foreign affairs of Belarus
- Hang Chuon Naron, Cambodian minister of education
- Yuri Nosenko, KGB officer and defector
- Alexei Obukhov, politician, diplomat and Deputy Foreign Minister of USSR
- Atanas Paparizov, member of the European Parliament from Bulgaria, former minister
- Lukáš Parízek, State Secretary of the Ministry of Foreign and European Affairs of the Slovak Republic and Special Representative for the Slovak OSCE Chairmanship
- Sergei M. Plekhanov, political scientist, former deputy director of the Institute of the US and Canada at the Russian Academy of Sciences
- Alexey Podberezkin, politician, professor, candidate for president in 2000 Russian presidential election
- Andrei Polyakov, Ambassador to Tunisia (2006-2011), Rwanda (2013-2017)
- Konstantin Provalov, Ambassador to Estonia (2000-2006)
- Mircea Răceanu, Romanian diplomat
- Leonid Shebarshin, KGB officer
- Vasily Sidorov, diplomat, Deputy Foreign Minister of Russia, Permanent Representative of Russia to the UN Office and other International Organizations in Geneva
- Filipp Sidorsky, Ambassador to Uzbekistan (1992-1997), and Bosnia and Herzegovina (1998-2000)
- Kassym-Jomart Tokayev, Chairman of the Senate of Kazakhstan
- Nikolay N. Udovichenko, Ambassador of Russia to Nigeria
- Grigol Vashadze, minister of foreign affairs of Georgia
- Sergey Yastrzhembsky, former Russian envoy to the EU
- Boris Titov, presidential commissioner for entrepreneurs' rights

=== Business ===
- Alisher Usmanov, Uzbek-born billionaire and Chairman of Gazprominvestholding, alleged to have bribed Prime Minister Dmitry Medvedev
- Patokh Chodiev, Belgian-Uzbek billionaire oligarch
- Vladimir Potanin, billionaire and president of Interros holding
- Alexander Lebedev, billionaire and Russian oligarch
- Nikolai N. Inozemtsev, deputy director of Gosplan
- Felix Vulis, Chief Executive of Eurasian Natural Resources Corporation plc (ENRC)

=== Journalism ===
- Bilkisu Yusuf, Nigerian journalist, columnist and editor, Muslim, feminist, and advocate for interfaith society
- Ksenia Sobchak, Russian TV anchor, journalist, politician, socialite and actress
- Vladimir R. Legoyda, Chairman of the Department for Church's Society and Mass Mediа Relations (Russian Orthodox Church) and Head of the Press Service of the Patriarch of Moscow and all Rus'.

=== Arts and literature ===
- Luba Sterlikova, artist, author
- Sergo Mikoyan, Soviet and Armenian historian

=== Academics ===
- Anatoly Torkunov, rector of the Institute
- Alexandru Şoltoianu, lecturer Moldova State University, a founder of the National Patriotic Front and political prisoner
- Alexei Bogaturov, international relations scholar
- Victor Sumsky, Russian orientalist

=== Cinema ===
- Nadezhda Mikhalkova, actress
