= Alexey Shebarshin =

Russian diplomat (born 1959)

- Алексей Шебаршин

Ambassador of Russia to Nigeria
- In office 20 April 2018 – 27 December 2024
- President: Vladimir Putin
- Preceded by: Nikolay Udovichenko
- Succeeded by: Andrey Podyolyshev

Ambassador of Russia to Sri Lanka and the Maldives
- In office 19 January 2005 – 27 August 2008
- Preceded by: Mikhail Karpov
- Succeeded by: Vladimir Mikhailov

Personal details
- Born: Alexey Leonidovich Shebarshin; 9 July 1959 (age 66) Moscow, RSFSR, Soviet Union
- Education: Moscow State Institute of International Relations
- Occupation: Politician; diplomat

Alexey Leonidovich Shebarshin (Russian: Алексей Леонидович Шебаршин; born 9 July 1959) is a Russian politician and diplomat. He served as the Russian Ambassador to Sri Lanka and the Maldives between 2005 and 2008, and Russian Ambassador to the Federal Republic of Nigeria between 2018 and 2024. He was appointed by President Vladimir Putin to the latter post in 2018.

== Education and career ==
Shebarshin attended the Moscow State Institute of International Relations, a diplomatic school of the Ministry of Foreign Affairs where he graduated to be an Ambassador in 1982. In 1982 he began his diplomatic career in the Russia's Foreign Affairs Ministry. In 2001, he was appointed the Russian governments and International Relations top manager for Gazprom.

In 2005, while still serving as International relations manager, he was appointed Russian Ambassador to Sri Lanka and concurrently to the Maldives. He served as ambassador to Sri Lanka and Maldives until 2008.

On 20 April 2018, Shebarshin was appointed Russian Ambassador to Nigeria by President Vladimir Putin. He stepped down as ambassador on 27 December 2024.
