= List of ambassadors of Russia to Cameroon =

Ambassador of the Russian Federation to the Republic of Cameroon
- Emblem of the Russian Foreign Ministry
- Incumbent; Georgy Todua since 14 November 2023
- Ministry of Foreign Affairs; Embassy of Russia in Yaoundé
- Style: His Excellency; The Honourable
- Reports to: Minister of Foreign Affairs
- Seat: Yaoundé
- Appointer: President of Russia
- Term length: At the pleasure of the president
- Website: Embassy of Russia in Cameroon

The ambassador of Russia to Cameroon is the official representative of the president and the government of the Russian Federation to the president and the government of Cameroon.

The ambassador and his staff work at large in the Russian embassy in Yaoundé. The current Russian ambassador to Cameroon is Georgy Todua, incumbent since 14 November 2023.

== History of diplomatic relations ==
Diplomatic relations between the Soviet Union and Cameroon were established on 20 February 1964. The first ambassador, Vladimir Snegiryov, was appointed on 4 July 1964. Between 1980 and 1990, during the Chadian–Libyan War, the Soviet embassy in Chad was closed, and the ambassador to Cameroon had dual accreditation as ambassador to Chad during this period.

With the dissolution of the Soviet Union in 1991, Cameroon recognised the Russian Federation as its successor state. The Russian embassy in Equatorial Guinea was closed in 1992, and since 7 August 1992, the Russian ambassador to Cameroon had dual accreditation as ambassador to Equatorial Guinea. This practice continued until 14 June 2024, when Karen Chalyan was appointed the first ambassador solely accredited to Equatorial Guinea since 1992.

== List of representatives of Russia to Cameroon (1964–present) ==
=== Ambassadors of the Soviet Union to Cameroon (1964–1991) ===
Name	Title	Appointment	Termination	Notes
Vladimir Snegiryov	Ambassador	4 July 1964	15 June 1968	Credentials presented on 14 August 1964
Ivan Melnik	Ambassador	15 June 1968	19 July 1972	Credentials presented on 5 September 1968
Aleksandr Malyshev	Ambassador	19 July 1972	28 August 1978	Credentials presented on 30 September 1972
Vadim Tikunov	Ambassador	28 August 1978	16 July 1980	Credentials presented on 4 November 1978
Spartak Zykov	Ambassador	9 November 1980	8 June 1986	Credentials presented on 10 January 1981
Vladimir Fyodorov	Ambassador	8 June 1986	18 March 1991	
Vitaly Litvin	Ambassador	18 March 1991	25 December 1991	

=== Ambassadors of the Russian Federation to Cameroon (1991–present) ===
Name	Title	Appointment	Termination	Notes
Vitaly Litvin	Ambassador	25 December 1991	6 February 1996	
Yevgeny Utkin	Ambassador	6 February 1996	6 May 2000	
Pulat Abdullayev	Ambassador	6 May 2000	24 March 2006	
Stanislav Akhmedov	Ambassador	24 March 2006	28 February 2011	
Nikolai Ratsiborinsky	Ambassador	28 February 2011	18 September 2017	
Anatoly Bashkin	Ambassador	18 September 2017	14 November 2023	Credentials presented on 22 December 2017
Georgy Todua	Ambassador	14 November 2023		Credentials presented on 29 November 2024
