= List of ambassadors of Russia to Kyrgyzstan =

Ambassador of the Russian Federation to the Kyrgyz Republic
- Emblem of the Russian Foreign Ministry
- Incumbent; Sergey Vakunov since 18 June 2024
- Ministry of Foreign Affairs; Embassy of Russia in Bishkek
- Style: His Excellency; The Honourable
- Reports to: Minister of Foreign Affairs
- Seat: Bishkek
- Appointer: President of Russia
- Term length: At the pleasure of the president
- Website: Embassy of Russia in Kyrgyzstan

The ambassador extraordinary and plenipotentiary of the Russian Federation to Kyrgyzstan is the official representative of the president and the government of the Russian Federation to the president and the government of Kyrgyzstan.

The ambassador and his staff work at large in the Embassy of Russia in Bishkek. There is a consulate general in Osh. The post of Russian ambassador to Kyrgyzstan is currently held by Sergey Vakunov, incumbent since 18 June 2024.

== History of diplomatic relations ==
With the dissolution of the Soviet Union in 1991, diplomatic relations between the Russian Federation and the Kyrgyz Republic were first established on 20 March 1992.

== Representatives of the Russian Federation to Kyrgyzstan (1992–present) ==
Name	Title	Appointment	Termination	Notes
Mikhail Romanov	Ambassador	22 April 1992	25 November 1996	
Georgiy Rudov	Ambassador	14 January 1997	14 August 2002	
Yevgeny Shmagin	Ambassador	14 August 2002	6 December 2006	
Valentin Vlasov	Ambassador	6 December 2006	30 July 2012	
Andrey Krutko	Ambassador	30 July 2012	30 January 2019	Credentials presented on 10 October 2012
Nikolay Udovichenko	Ambassador	30 January 2019	18 June 2024	Credentials presented on 13 March 2019
Sergey Vakunov	Ambassador	18 June 2024		Credentials presented on 10 September 2024
