= List of ambassadors of Russia to Nigeria =

Chief of Russian diplomatic mission to Nigeria

Ambassador of the Russian Federation to the Federal Republic of Nigeria
- Emblem of the Russian Foreign Ministry
- Incumbent; Andrey Podyolyshev since 27 December 2024
- Ministry of Foreign Affairs; Embassy of Russia in Abuja
- Style: His Excellency
- Reports to: Minister of Foreign Affairs
- Seat: Abuja
- Appointer: President of Russia
- Term length: At the pleasure of the president
- Website: Embassy of Russia in Nigeria

The ambassador extraordinary and plenipotentiary of the Russian Federation to the Federal Republic of Nigeria is the official representative of the president and the government of the Russian Federation to the president and the government of Nigeria.

The ambassador and his staff work at large in the Embassy of Russia in Abuja. The post of Russian ambassador to Nigeria is currently held by Andrey Podyolyshev, incumbent since 27 December 2024.

== History of diplomatic relations ==
Diplomatic relations between the Soviet Union and Nigeria were established at the mission level on 12 January 1961. The first ambassador, Fyodor Dolya, was appointed on 21 November 1961. With the dissolution of the Soviet Union in 1991, representatives continued to be exchanged between the Russian Federation and Nigeria.

== List of representatives (1961–present) ==
=== Soviet Union to Nigeria (1961–1991) ===
Name	Title	Appointment	Termination	Notes
Fyodor Dolya	Ambassador	21 November 1961	7 April 1964	
Aleksandr Romanov	Ambassador	7 April 1964	20 August 1970	
Boris Vorobyov	Ambassador	20 August 1970	9 October 1974	
Aleksandr Teterin	Ambassador	9 October 1974	5 June 1978	
Vladimir Snegiryov	Ambassador	5 June 1978	8 October 1985	
Yuri Kuplyakov	Ambassador	8 October 1985	23 March 1990	
Oleg Bocharov	Ambassador	23 March 1990	1991	

=== Russian Federation to Nigeria (1991–present) ===
Name	Title	Appointment	Termination	Notes
Lev Parshin	Ambassador	19 June 1993	17 December 1997	
Gennady Ilyichev	Ambassador	11 December 1998	12 March 2004	
Igor Melikhov	Ambassador	12 March 2004	10 June 2008	
Alexander Polyakov	Ambassador	10 June 2008	1 April 2013	
Nikolay Udovichenko	Ambassador	1 April 2013	20 April 2018	
Alexey Shebarshin	Ambassador	20 April 2018	27 December 2024	
Andrey Podyolyshev	Ambassador	27 December 2024		

== See also ==
- Foreign relations of Russia
- Foreign relations of Nigeria
- Ambassadors of Russia
