= Electoral history of Vladimir Zhirinovsky =

Elections featuring Russian politician

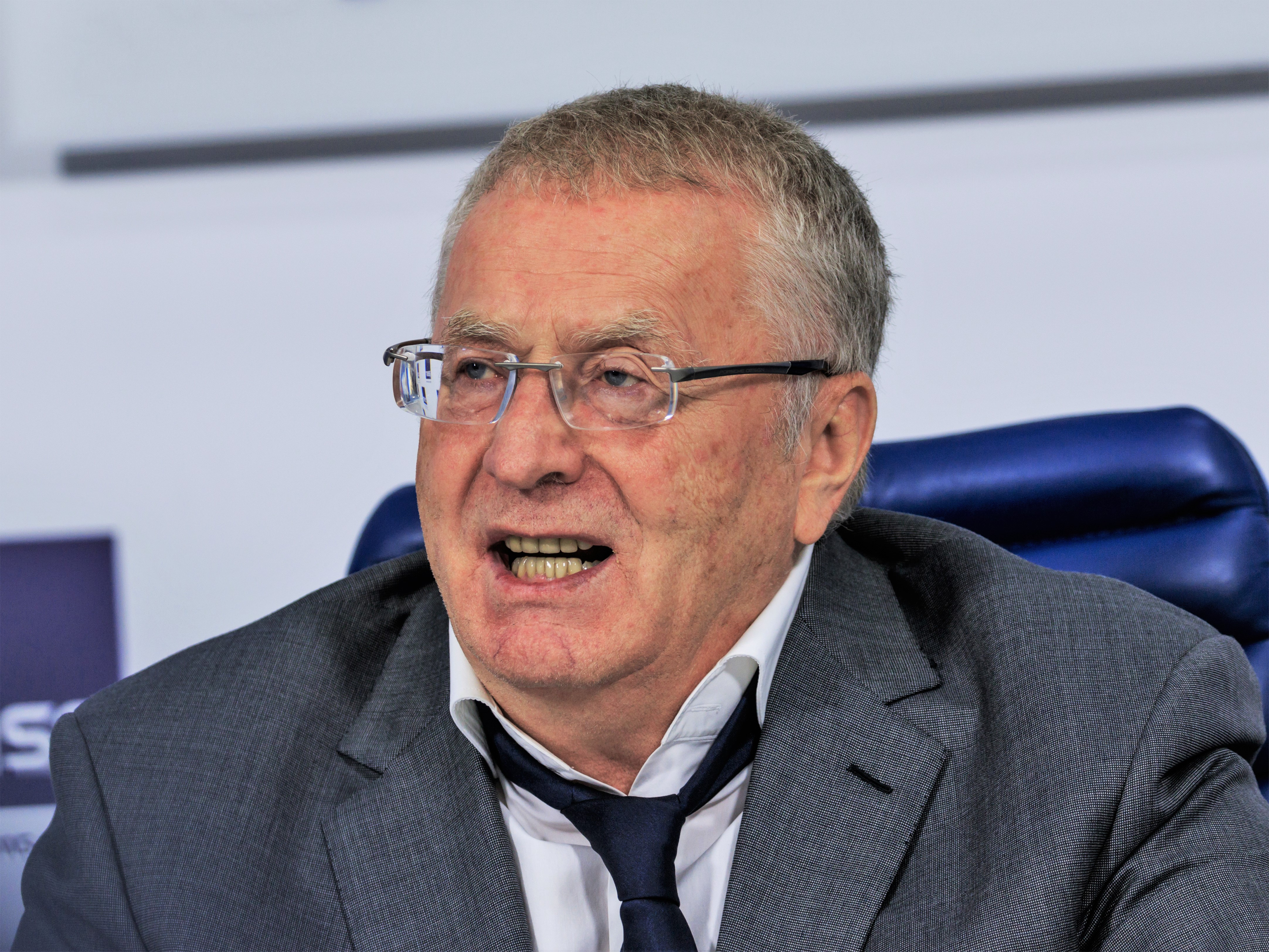
Vladimir Zhirinovsky

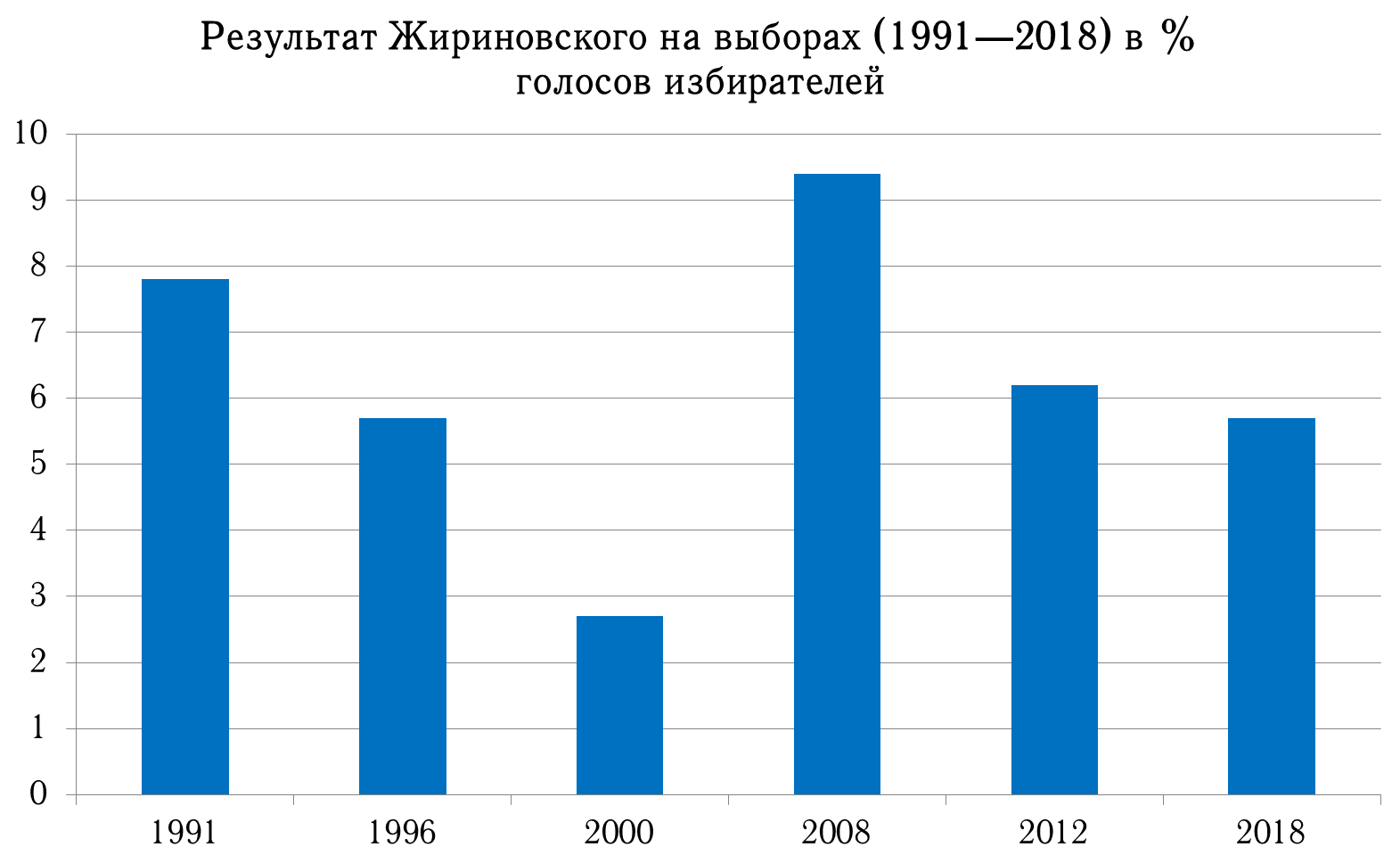
Vladimir Zhirinovsky's results in the presidential elections from 1991 to 2018

Electoral history of Vladimir Zhirinovsky, Member of the State Duma (1993–2022), Deputy Chairman of the State Duma (2000–2011) and Leader of Liberal Democratic Party (1991–2022). Liberal Democratic presidential candidate 1991, 1996, 2000, 2008, 2012 and 2018.

== Presidential elections ==
=== 1991 ===
1991 presidential election
Presidential candidate	Vice Presidential candidate	Party	Votes	%
Boris Yeltsin	Alexander Rutskoy	Independent	45,552,041	58.6
Nikolai Ryzhkov	Boris Gromov	Communist Party	13,395,335	17.2
Vladimir Zhirinovsky	Andrey Zavidiya	Liberal Democratic Party	6,211,007	8.0
Aman Tuleyev	Viktor Bocharov	Independent	5,417,464	7.0
Albert Makashov	Aleksei Sergeyev	Independent	2,969,511	3.8
Vadim Bakatin	Ramazan Abdulatipov	Independent	2,719,757	3.5
Against all			1,525,410	2.0
Source: Nohlen & Stöver, University of Essex, Voice of Russia

=== 1996 ===
First round of 1996 presidential election
Candidate	Party	Votes	%
Boris Yeltsin	Independent	26,665,495	35.8
Gennady Zyuganov	Communist Party	24,211,686	32.5
Alexander Lebed	Congress of Russian Communities	10,974,736	14.7
Grigory Yavlinsky	Yabloko	5,505,752	7.4
Vladimir Zhirinovsky	Liberal Democratic Party	4,311,479	5.8
Svyatoslav Fyodorov	Party of Workers' Self-Government	699,158	0.9
Mikhail Gorbachev	Independent	386,069	0.5
Martin Shakkum	Independent	277,068	0.4
Yury Vlasov	Independent	151,282	0.2
Vladimir Bryntsalov	Russian Socialist Party	123,065	0.2
Aman Tuleyev	Independent	308	0.0
Against all		1,163,921	1.6
Source: Nohlen & Stöver, Colton

=== 2000 ===
2000 presidential election
Candidate	Party	Votes	%
Vladimir Putin	Independent	29,740,467	39,5
Gennady Zyuganov	Communist Party	21,928,468	29.5
Grigory Yavlinsky	Yabloko	4,351,450	5.9
Aman Tuleyev	Independent	2,217,364	3.0
Vladimir Zhirinovsky	Liberal Democratic Party	2,026,509	2.7
Konstantin Titov	Independent	1,107,269	1.5
Ella Pamfilova	For Civic Dignity	758,967	1.0
Stanislav Govorukhin	Independent	328,723	0.4
Yury Skuratov	Independent	319,189	0.4
Alexey Podberezkin	Spiritual Heritage	98,177	0.1
Umar Dzhabrailov	Independent	78,498	0.1
Against all		1,414,673	1.9
Source: Nohlen & Stöver, University of Essex

=== 2008 ===
2008 presidential election
Candidates	Party	Votes	%
Dmitry Medvedev	United Russia	52,530,712	71.2
Gennady Zyuganov	Communist Party	13,243,550	18.0
Vladimir Zhirinovsky	Liberal Democratic Party	6,988,510	9.5
Andrei Bogdanov	Democratic Party	968,344	1.3
Source: Nohlen & Stöver

=== 2012 ===
2012 presidential election
Candidates	Party	Votes	%
Vladimir Putin	United Russia	45,602,075	63.60
Gennady Zyuganov	Communist Party	12,318,353	17.18
Mikhail Prokhorov	Independent	5,722,508	7.98
Vladimir Zhirinovsky	Liberal Democratic Party	4,458,103	6.22
Sergey Mironov	A Just Russia	2,763,935	3.85
Source: Central Election Commission of the Russian Federation

=== 2018 ===
2018 presidential election
Candidates	Party	Votes	%
Vladimir Putin	Independent	56,430,712	76.69
Pavel Grudinin	Communist Party	8,659,206	11.77
Vladimir Zhirinovsky	Liberal Democratic Party	4,154,985	5.65
Ksenia Sobchak	Civic Initiative	1,238,031	1.68
Grigory Yavlinsky	Yabloko	769,644	1.05
Boris Titov	Party of Growth	556,801	0.76
Maxim Suraykin	Communists of Russia	499,342	0.68
Sergey Baburin	Russian All-People's Union	479,013	0.65
Source: CEC

== State Duma elections ==
=== 1993 ===
In 1993, Vladimir Zhirinovsky ran for the State Duma from Shchyolkovo single-member constituency, in all subsequent elections, he ran on the party list.

Shchyolkovsky single-member constituency
Candidates	Party	Votes	%
Vladimir Zhirinovsky	Liberal Democratic Party	104,874	34.51%
Nikolay Pashin	Independent	39,329	12.94%
Oleg Novikov	Choice of Russia	35,320	11.62%
Aleksey Adrov	Civic Union	31,820	10.47%
Vladimir Kulbida	Independent	16,688	5.49%
Vladimir Solodovnikov	Yavlinsky–Boldyrev–Lukin	12,829	4.22%
against all		45,676	15.03%
Total		303,936	100%

== State Duma Chairman elections ==
=== 2003 ===
Candidate	Party	For	
Boris Gryzlov	United Russia	352	78.2%
Sergey Baburin	Rodina	79	17.6%
Ivan Melnikov	Communist Party	69	15.3%
Vladimir Zhirinovsky	Liberal Democratic Party	51	11.3%
Source: Спикером Госдумы избран Борис Грызлов

=== 2011 ===
Candidate	Party	For	
Sergey Naryshkin	United Russia	238	52.9%
Ivan Melnikov	Communist Party	208	46.2%
Vladimir Zhirinovsky	Liberal Democratic Party	204	45.3%
Sergey Mironov	A Just Russia	203	45.1%
Source: Госдума избрала своим спикером Сергея Нарышкина

== Belgorod Oblast gubernatorial election, 1999 ==
Candidates	Party	Votes	%
Yevgeny Savchenko	Our Home – Russia	431,168	53.46
Mikhail Beskhmelnitsyn	Communist Party	158,931	19.71
Vladimir Zhirinovsky	Liberal Democratic Party	142,864	17.72
Vladimir Bezymyanny	Independent	14,330	1.78
Vladimir Naboka	Independent	2,192	0.27
against all		31,132	3.86
Total		806,450	100
Source: Сводная таблица результатов выборов главы администрации Белгородской области

== Commissioner for human rights election, 2004 ==
In 2004, Zhirinovsky was nominated by his party for office of the commissioner for human rights in Russia. To qualify for the second round, a candidate needed to win 300 votes in the State Duma. Of five candidates only Vladimir Lukin was able to cross the threshold and was later confirmed with 333 votes in favor.

Results of the 13 February 2004 Russian commissioner for human rights election
Candidates	Nominator	For		Against	Abstain	No vote
Vladimir Lukin	President of Russia	335	74.4%	1	0	114
Vladimir Zhirinovsky	Liberal Democratic Party	187	41.6%	33	5	225
Natalya Yakovleva	Members of the Duma	38	8.4%	45	9	358
Georgiy Rudov	Members of the Duma	18	4.0%	41	9	382
Aleksandr Lagutin	Members of the Duma	10	2.2%	61	2	377
Source: ХРОНИКА заседания Государственной Думы 13 февраля 2004 года
