= List of ambassadors of Russia to Rwanda =

Ambassador of the Russian Federation to the Republic of Rwanda
- Emblem of the Russian Foreign Ministry
- Incumbent; Alexander Polyakov since 14 June 2024
- Ministry of Foreign Affairs; Embassy of Russia in Kigali
- Style: Her Excellency; The Honourable
- Reports to: Minister of Foreign Affairs
- Seat: Kigali
- Appointer: President of Russia
- Term length: At the pleasure of the president
- Website: Embassy of Russia in Kigali

The ambassador of Russia to Rwanda is the official representative of the president and the government of the Russian Federation to the president and the government of Rwanda.

The ambassador and his staff work at large in the Russian embassy in Kigali. The current Russian ambassador to Rwanda is Alexander Polyakov, incumbent since 14 June 2024.

== History of diplomatic relations ==
Following a series of events, including the Rwandan Revolution in 1959 and the 1961 Rwandan monarchy referendum, culminating in a Rwandan declaration of independence in 1962, the Soviet Union moved to establish relations with the new state. The two countries agreed to exchange ambassadors on 17 October 1963, and the first Soviet ambassador to Rwanda, Yevgeny Afanasenko, was appointed on 1 November 1966, and presented his credentials on 4 January 1967. With the dissolution of the Soviet Union in 1991, the incumbent Soviet ambassador, Pyotr Komendant, continued as a representative of the Russian Federation until 1994.

== List of representatives (1966- present) ==
=== Soviet Union to Rwanda (1966-1991) ===
Name	Title	Appointment	Termination	Notes
Yevgeny Afanasenko	Ambassador	1 November 1966	24 May 1972	Presented credentials on 4 January 1967
Grigory Zhilyakov	Ambassador	2 June 1972	19 May 1978	Presented credentials on 21 July 1972
Gennady Rykov	Ambassador	19 May 1978	17 November 1984	Presented credentials on 7 June 1978
Gennady Sokolov	Ambassador	17 November 1984	23 August 1990	Presented credentials on 8 January 1985
Pyotr Komendant	Ambassador	23 August 1990	25 December 1991	

=== Russian Federation to Rwanda (1991-present) ===
Name	Title	Appointment	Termination	Notes
Pyotr Komendant	Ambassador	25 December 1991	11 January 1994	
Anatoly Smirnov	Ambassador	11 January 1994	28 July 1998	
Stanislav Akhmedov	Ambassador	28 July 1998	17 September 2002	
Aleksei Dulyan	Ambassador	17 September 2002	20 December 2006	
Mirgayas Shirinsky	Ambassador	20 December 2006	22 May 2013	
Andrei Polyakov	Ambassador	22 May 2013	31 October 2017	
Karen Chalyan	Ambassador	14 March 2018	14 June 2024	
Alexander Polyakov	Ambassador	14 June 2024		
