= Yuri Kuplyakov =

Soviet diplomat (1930–2020)

- Юрий Викторович Купляков

Ambassador of the Soviet Union to Nigeria
- In office 8 October 1985 – 23 March 1990
- Preceded by: Vladimir Snegiryov
- Succeeded by: Oleg Bocharov

Personal details
- Born: 8 September 1930
- Died: 25 February 2020 (aged 89)
- Education: Moscow State Institute of International Relations
- Awards: Order of Friendship of Peoples; Jubilee Medal "In Commemoration of the 100th Anniversary of the Birth of Vladimir Ilyich Lenin"; Medal "Veteran of Labour"

Yuri Viktorovich Kuplyakov (Russian: Юрий Викторович Купляков, 8 September 1930 – 25 February 2020) was a Soviet diplomat. He served in various embassies over a career spanning 35 years, culminating in the position of Ambassador of the Soviet Union to Nigeria between 1985 and 1990.

== Career ==
Kuplyakov was born on 8 September 1930, and attended the Moscow State Institute of International Relations. Graduating in 1955, he began a 35-year long career in the Soviet diplomatic service. His initial service was in the Middle East, serving in the Soviet embassies in Israel and Iraq, after which he was sent to North America as counsellor in the Soviet embassy in Mexico. He also spent time working in African countries, in the embassies in Uganda and Ethiopia. His posting to the newly opened embassy in Uganda was a significant milestone. The first Soviet ambassador to the country, Dmitry Safonov, recalled "[After establishing the embassy] it was possible to take up visits to Ugandan officials and ambassadors of other countries — and by that time there had already been about two dozen of them, counting charge d'affaires — which I did, accompanied by the second secretary of the embassy, Yuri Viktorovich Kuplyakov, who had already managed to settle down in a couple of weeks in Uganda, so much that in my eyes he looked like an old-timer - he seemed to know everything here and willingly shared this knowledge with me." Kuplyakov's African career culminated in the position of Soviet ambassador to Nigeria between 1985 and 23 March 1990.

Kuplyakov's service abroad was interspersed with positions in the Central Office of the Ministry of Foreign Affairs, initially in the Middle Eastern department, then the second European department, and finally the third African department. After completing his ambassadorship in 1990, Kuplyakov returned once more to the Central Office, and worked in the Ministry's Office for Union Republics, which became the Department of Commonwealth of Independent States of the Ministry of Foreign Affairs of the Russian Federation after the dissolution of the Soviet Union.

Kuplyakov received a number of awards over his career, including the Order of Friendship of Peoples, Jubilee Medal "In Commemoration of the 100th Anniversary of the Birth of Vladimir Ilyich Lenin" the Medal "Veteran of Labour", and the Certificate of Honour of the Presidium of the Supreme Soviet of the Russian Soviet Federative Socialist Republic. Kuplyakov died on 25 February 2020 at the age of 89. The Russian Ministry of Foreign Affairs offered its condolences, describing Kuplyakov as "a talented diplomat who devoted his whole life to the service of the Motherland and its national interests [who] has always been distinguished by high professionalism, a versatile and wide range of knowledge, hard work, and an attentive attitude to colleagues and subordinates."
