= List of ambassadors of Russia to Somalia =

Ambassador of the Russian Federation to the Federal Republic of Somalia
- Emblem of the Russian Foreign Ministry
- Incumbent; Mikhail Golovanov since 24 April 2019
- Ministry of Foreign Affairs; Embassy of Russia in Djibouti City
- Style: His Excellency; The Honourable
- Reports to: Minister of Foreign Affairs
- Seat: Djibouti City
- Appointer: President of Russia
- Term length: At the pleasure of the president
- Website: Embassy of Russia in Djibouti

The ambassador of Russia to Somalia is the official representative of the president and the government of the Russian Federation to the president and the government of Somalia.

The ambassador and his staff work at large in the Russian embassy in Djibouti City. The current Russian ambassador to Somalia is Mikhail Golovanov, incumbent since 24 April 2019. The Russian ambassador to Somalia is a non-resident ambassador who has dual accreditation as the ambassador to Djibouti.

== History of diplomatic relations ==
Formal diplomatic relations between Somalia and the Soviet Union were established in 1960. Gennady Fomin was appointed as the first ambassador on 25 November 1960. Exchange of ambassadors continued throughout the following years. With the Somali Civil War resulting in a collapse of centralised government, the Soviet embassy was evacuated in 1991. Diplomatic relations remained broken off until being restored with the Federal Government of Somalia in 2013. Since then, the Russian ambassador to Djibouti has had dual accreditation as the non-resident ambassador to Somalia.

== List of representatives of Russia to Somalia (1960–present) ==
=== Soviet Union to Somalia (1960–1991) ===
Name	Title	Appointment	Termination	Notes
Gennady Fomin	Ambassador	25 November 1960	9 October 1964	Credentials presented on 30 December 1960
Semyon Dyukarev	Ambassador	9 October 1964	19 July 1969	Credentials presented on 31 October 1964
Aleksey Pasyutin	Ambassador	19 July 1969	3 October 1974	Credentials presented on 26 August 1969
Georgy Samsonov	Ambassador	3 October 1974	14 December 1978	Credentials presented on 20 October 1974
Vladimir Aldoshin	Ambassador	14 December 1978	28 May 1983	Credentials presented on 11 January 1979
Boris Ilichyov	Ambassador	28 May 1983	24 December 1985	Credentials presented on 28 July 1983
Bakhadyr Abdurazakov	Ambassador	24 December 1985	8 February 1989	
Vladimir Korneyev	Ambassador	8 February 1989	18 March 1991	
Somali Civil War - Diplomatic relations interrupted (1991-2013)

=== Russian Federation to Somalia (2013–present) ===
Name	Title	Appointment	Termination	Notes
Valery Orlov	Ambassador	25 July 2013	27 November 2015	Concurrently ambassador to Djibouti
Sergey Kuznetsov	Ambassador	27 November 2015	4 April 2019	Credentials presented on 14 March 2016 Concurrently ambassador to Djibouti
Mikhail Golovanov	Ambassador	24 April 2019		Credentials presented on 10 July 2019; Concurrently ambassador to Djibouti
