= List of ambassadors of Russia to Chad =

Ambassador of the Russian Federation to the Republic of Chad
- Emblem of the Russian Foreign Ministry
- Incumbent; Vladimir Sokolenko since 26 October 2022
- Ministry of Foreign Affairs; Embassy of Russia in N'Djamena
- Style: His Excellency; The Honourable
- Reports to: Minister of Foreign Affairs
- Seat: N'Djamena
- Appointer: President of Russia
- Term length: At the pleasure of the president
- Website: Embassy of Russia in Chad

The ambassador of Russia to Chad is the official representative of the president and the government of the Russian Federation to the president and the government of Chad.

The ambassador and his staff work at large in the Russian embassy in N'Djamena. The current Russian ambassador to Chad is Vladimir Sokolenko, incumbent since 26 October 2022.

== History of diplomatic relations ==
Diplomatic relations between the Soviet Union and Chad were established on 24 November 1964. The first ambassador, Valentin Vdovin, was appointed on 21 May 1965. Between 1980 and 1990, during the Chadian–Libyan War, the Soviet embassy in Chad was closed, and the ambassador to Cameroon had dual accreditation as ambassador to Chad during this period.

With the dissolution of the Soviet Union in 1991, Chad recognised the Russian Federation as its successor state. The incumbent ambassador, Vladimir Filatov, continued as the ambassador from Russia until 1992.

== List of representatives of Russia to Chad (1965–present) ==
=== Ambassadors of the Soviet Union to Chad (1965–1991) ===
| Name | Title | Appointment | Termination | Notes |
|---|---|---|---|---|
| Valentin Vdovin | Ambassador | 21 May 1965 | 29 July 1969 | Credentials presented on 28 August 1965 |
| Yevgeny Nersesov | Ambassador | 29 July 1969 | 18 September 1974 | Credentials presented on 25 October 1969 |
| Arkady Sokolov | Ambassador | 18 September 1974 | 24 November 1977 | Credentials presented on 28 October 1974 |
| Ivan Marchuk | Ambassador | 24 November 1977 | 24 September 1979 | Credentials presented on 13 December 1977 |
| Spartak Zykov | Ambassador | 29 October 1979 | 1986 | Credentials presented on 29 January 1980; Concurrently ambassador to Cameroon after 3 November 1980 |
| Vladimir Fyodorov | Ambassador | 1986 | 18 October 1990 | Concurrently ambassador to Cameroon |
| Vladimir Filatov | Ambassador | 24 September 1990 | 25 December 1991 | |

=== Ambassadors of the Russian Federation to Chad (1991–present) ===
| Name | Title | Appointment | Termination | Notes |
|---|---|---|---|---|
| Vladimir Filatov | Ambassador | 25 December 1991 | 22 April 1992 | |
| Gennady Gumenyuk | Ambassador | 31 December 1992 | 21 April 1997 | |
| Valery Vorobyov | Ambassador | 21 April 1997 | 22 August 2000 | |
| Boris Pankratov | Ambassador | 22 August 2000 | 2 April 2003 | Died in post |
| Vladimir Martynov | Ambassador | 27 January 2004 | 7 August 2009 | |
| Vladimir Prygin | Ambassador | 14 January 2010 | 17 December 2015 | Credentials presented on 20 April 2010 |
| Aleksandr Chvykov | Ambassador | 17 December 2015 | 26 October 2022 | Credentials presented on 19 April 2016 |
| Vladimir Sokolenko | Ambassador | 26 October 2022 | | Credentials presented on 13 January 2023 |
