= List of ambassadors of Russia to Laos =

Ambassador of the Russian Federation to the Lao People's Democratic Republic
- ສະຖານທູດຂອງສະຫະພັນລັດເຊຍປະຈຳສາທາລະນະລັດປະຊາທິປະໄຕປະຊາຊົນລາວ
- Emblem of the Russian Foreign Ministry
- Incumbent; Sergey Zhyostky since 22 October 2025
- Ministry of Foreign Affairs; Embassy of Russia in Vientiane
- Style: His Excellency; The Honourable
- Reports to: Minister of Foreign Affairs
- Seat: Vientiane
- Appointer: President of Russia
- Term length: At the pleasure of the president
- Website: Embassy of Russia in Vientiane

The ambassador of Russia to Laos is the official representative of the president and the government of the Russian Federation to the president and the government of Laos.

The ambassador and his staff work at large in the Russian Embassy in Vientiane. The current Russian ambassador to Laos is Sergey Zhyostky, incumbent since 22 October 2025.

== History of diplomatic relations ==
Negotiations over diplomatic relations took place between the Soviet Union and the Kingdom of Laos, newly independent from the French Union in 1953. A nominal agreement to exchange diplomatic representatives was worked out between 23 October 1956 and 26 July 1957, but was ultimately not implemented. A subsequent agreement was concluded on 7 October 1960, during which period the Laotian Civil War was being fought. The incumbent Soviet ambassador to Cambodia, Aleksandr Abramov, was dually accredited to Laos from 8 October. By 1962, the embassy in Laos had been prepared, and on 31 August 1962 Sergey Afanasyev took over from Abramov as the first ambassador accredited solely to Laos. Representation continued after the Laotian Civil War came to an end in 1975, with the overthrow of the Kingdom of Laos and the establishment of the Lao People's Democratic Republic. With the dissolution of the Soviet Union in 1991, Laos recognised the Russian Federation as its successor state on 31 December 1991. The incumbent Soviet ambassador, Georgiy Rudov, continued as the Russian ambassador until 1993. Diplomatic representatives have since continued to be exchanged between the two nations.

== List of representatives (1960–present) ==
=== Soviet Union to the Kingdom of Laos (1960–1975) ===
Name	Title	Appointment	Termination	Notes
Aleksandr Abramov	Ambassador	8 October 1960	31 August 1962	Concurrently ambassador to Cambodia; Credentials presented on 26 October 1960
Sergey Afanasyev	Ambassador	31 August 1962	21 October 1964	Credentials presented on 9 November 1962
Boris Kirnasovsky	Ambassador	21 October 1964	21 June 1968	Credentials presented on 5 November 1964
Viktor Minin	Ambassador	21 June 1968	14 October 1972	Credentials presented on 3 September 1968
Valentin Vdovin	Ambassador	14 October 1972	2 December 1975	Credentials presented on 4 November 1972

=== Soviet Union to the Lao People's Democratic Republic (1975–1991) ===
Name	Title	Appointment	Termination	Notes
Valentin Vdovin	Ambassador	2 December 1975	4 December 1976	
Mitrofan Podolsky	Ambassador	4 December 1976	9 October 1980	Credentials presented on 28 December 1976
Vladimir Sobchenko	Ambassador	9 October 1980	3 October 1986	Credentials presented on 16 October 1980
Yury Mikheyev	Ambassador	3 October 1986	9 October 1990	
Georgiy Rudov	Ambassador	9 October 1990	25 December 1991	

=== Russian Federation to the Lao People's Democratic Republic (1991–present) ===
Name	Title	Appointment	Termination	Notes
Georgiy Rudov	Ambassador	25 December 1991	6 April 1993	
Vladimir Fedotov	Ambassador	6 April 1993	30 April 1997	
Valentin Yeremchenko	Ambassador	30 April 1997	17 June 2002	
Yury Raykov	Ambassador	17 June 2002	17 January 2007	
Vladimir Plotnikov	Ambassador	17 January 2007	3 February 2010	
Oleg Kabanov	Ambassador	3 February 2010	27 June 2014	
Mikhail Baranov	Ambassador	27 June 2014	6 September 2019	
Vladimir Kalinin	Ambassador	6 September 2019	22 October 2025	Credentials presented on 21 November 2019
Sergey Zhyostky	Ambassador	22 October 2025		
