= List of ambassadors of Russia to Mauritius =

Ambassador of the Russian Federation to the Republic of Mauritius
- Emblem of the Russian Foreign Ministry

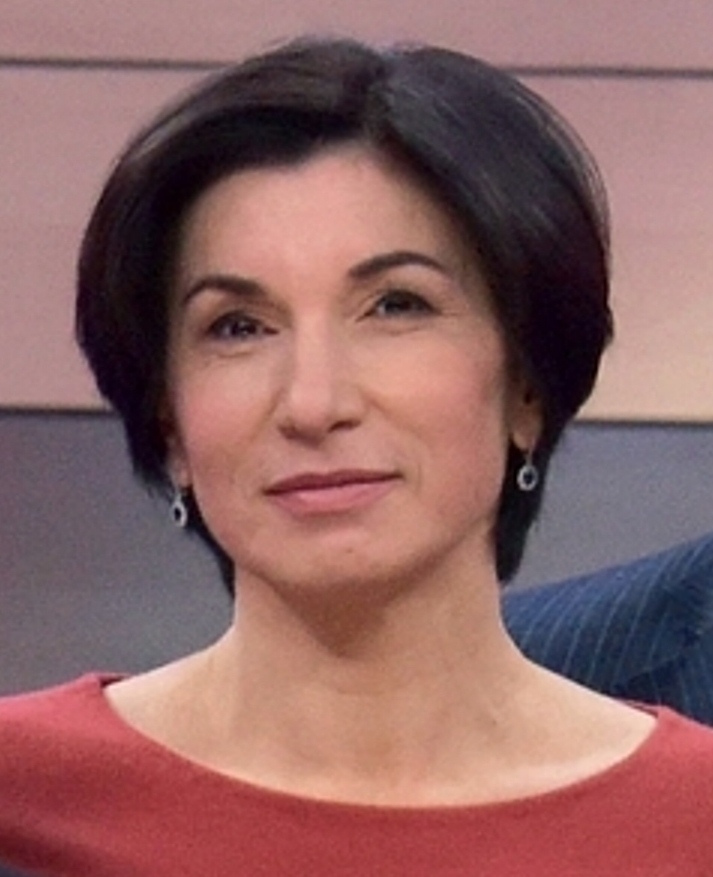
- Incumbent; Irada Zeynalova since 13 September 2024
- Ministry of Foreign Affairs; Embassy of Russia in Floréal
- Style: Her Excellency; The Honourable
- Reports to: Minister of Foreign Affairs
- Seat: Floréal
- Appointer: President of Russia
- Term length: At the pleasure of the president
- Website: Embassy of Russia in Mauritius

The ambassador of Russia to Mauritius is the official representative of the president and the government of the Russian Federation to the president and the government of Mauritius.

The ambassador and her staff work at large in the Russian embassy in Floréal. The current Russian ambassador to Mauritius is Irada Zeynalova, incumbent since 13 September 2024.

== History of diplomatic relations ==
Diplomatic relations between the Soviet Union and Mauritius were established on 17 March 1968. The first ambassador, Vasily Roslavtsev, was appointed on 27 November 1968. With the dissolution of the Soviet Union in 1991, Mauritius recognised the Russian Federation as its successor state. The incumbent Soviet ambassador, Viktor Trifonov, continued as the Russian ambassador until 1994.

== List of representatives of Russia to Mauritius (1968–present) ==
=== Ambassadors of the Soviet Union to Mauritius (1968–1991) ===
Name	Title	Appointment	Termination	Notes
Vasily Roslavtsev	Ambassador	27 November 1968	5 July 1973	Credentials presented on 12 February 1969
Nikolai Bandura	Ambassador	5 July 1973	15 January 1976	Credentials presented on 25 July 1973
Ilya Safronov	Ambassador	15 January 1976	10 July 1981	Credentials presented on 4 March 1976
Nikolai Pankov	Ambassador	10 July 1981	28 October 1986	Credentials presented on 18 August 1981
Yuri Kirichenko	Ambassador	28 October 1986	6 December 1990	
Viktor Trifonov	Ambassador	6 December 1990	25 December 1991	

=== Ambassadors of the Russian Federation to Mauritius (1991–present) ===
Name	Title	Appointment	Termination	Notes
Viktor Trifonov	Ambassador	25 December 1991	13 September 1994	
Agaron Asatur	Ambassador	13 September 1994	5 May 1999	
Valery Nesterushkin	Ambassador	5 May 1999	12 February 2004	
Olga Ivanova	Ambassador	12 February 2004	20 April 2011	
Vyacheslav Nikiforov	Ambassador	20 April 2011	18 September 2017	Credentials presented on 28 July 2011
Konstantin Klimovsky	Ambassador	18 September 2017	13 September 2024	Credentials presented on 9 November 2017
Irada Zeynalova	Ambassador	13 September 2024		Credentials presented on 15 October 2024
