= List of ambassadors of Russia to Tunisia =

Ambassador of the Russian Federation to the Republic of Tunisia
- Emblem of the Russian Foreign Ministry
- Incumbent; Aleksandr Zolotov since 11 January 2022
- Ministry of Foreign Affairs; Embassy of Russia in Tunis
- Style: His Excellency; The Honourable
- Reports to: Minister of Foreign Affairs
- Seat: Tunis
- Appointer: President of Russia
- Term length: At the pleasure of the president
- Website: Embassy of Russia in Tunis

The ambassador of Russia to Tunisia is the official representative of the president and the government of the Russian Federation to the president and the government of Tunisia.

The ambassador and his staff work at large in the Russian embassy in Tunis. The current Russian ambassador to Tunisia is Aleksandr Zolotov, incumbent since 11 January 2022.

== History of diplomatic relations ==
Diplomatic relations between the USSR and Tunisia were established on 11 July 1956. The embassy in Tunis was opened on 4 May 1960, with the first ambassador, Klych Kuliev, appointed on 30 August 1960 and presenting his credentials on 7 September 1960. After the dissolution of the Soviet Union, Tunisia announced the recognition of Russia as its legal successor on 25 December 1991. The incumbent Soviet ambassador, Boris Shchiborin, continued as a representative of the Russian Federation until 1996.

== List of representatives (1960–present) ==
=== Soviet Union to Tunisia (1960–1991) ===
Name	Title	Appointment	Termination	Notes
Klych Kuliev	Ambassador	30 August 1960	21 September 1962	Presented credentials on 7 September 1960
Anatoly Kulazhenkov	Ambassador	21 September 1962	21 October 1964	Presented credentials on 19 December 1962
Aleksandr Malyshev	Ambassador	21 October 1964	9 September 1969	Presented credentials on 11 November 1964
Sergei Afanasyev	Ambassador	9 September 1969	17 November 1973	Presented credentials on 16 November 1969
Boris Kolokolov	Ambassador	17 November 1973	28 March 1981	Presented credentials on 17 December 1973
Vsevolod Kizichenko	Ambassador	28 March 1981	3 October 1986	Presented credentials on 19 May 1981
Vladimir Sobchenko	Ambassador	3 October 1986	15 February 1991	
Boris Shchiborin	Ambassador	15 February 1991	25 December 1991	

=== Russian Federation to Tunisia (1991–present) ===
Name	Title	Appointment	Termination	Notes
Boris Shchiborin	Ambassador	25 December 1991	23 August 1996	
Veniamin Popov	Ambassador	23 August 1996	22 July 2000	
Aleksei Podtserov	Ambassador	22 July 2000	11 April 2006	
Andrei Polyakov	Ambassador	11 April 2006	14 January 2011	
Aleksandr Shein	Ambassador	14 January 2011	10 July 2015	
Sergei Nikolayev	Ambassador	10 July 2015	11 January 2022	
Aleksandr Zolotov	Ambassador	11 January 2022		
