= List of ambassadors of Russia to Sri Lanka =

Ambassador of the Russian Federation to the Democratic Socialist Republic of Sri Lanka
- Emblem of the Russian Foreign Ministry

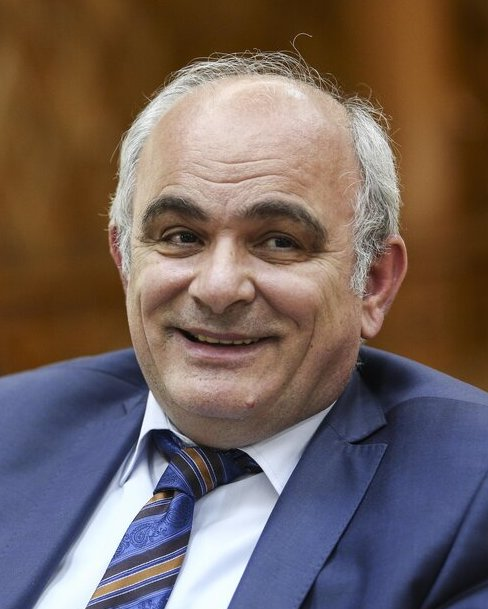
- Incumbent; Levan Dzhagaryan since 8 September 2022
- Ministry of Foreign Affairs; Embassy of Russia in Colombo
- Style: His Excellency; The Honourable
- Reports to: Minister of Foreign Affairs
- Seat: Colombo
- Appointer: President of Russia
- Term length: At the pleasure of the president
- Website: Embassy of Russia in Colombo

The ambassador of Russia to Sri Lanka is the official representative of the president and the government of the Russian Federation to the president and the government of Sri Lanka.

The ambassador and his staff work at large in the Russian Embassy in Colombo. The current Russian ambassador to Sri Lanka is Levan Dzhagaryan, incumbent since 8 September 2022. The ambassador to Sri Lanka has dual accreditation as the non-resident ambassador to the Maldives since 1966. There is a consulate-general in Malé, Maldives.

== History of diplomatic relations ==
Diplomatic relations between the Soviet Union and what was then Ceylon were formally established in December 1956, with the appointment of the first ambassador, Vladimir Yakovlev, appointed on 19 February 1957. Representatives were thereafter exchanged between the two nations, and after the renaming to Sri Lanka in 1972. With the dissolution of the Soviet Union in 1991, Sri Lanka recognised the Russian Federation as its successor state, and exchange of ambassadors have continued.

Diplomatic relations between the Soviet Union and the Republic of Maldives were established on 14 September 1966, with the incumbent Soviet ambassador to Sri Lanka, Leonid Korobin, concurrently accredited to the Maldives. The Maldives recognised the Russian Federation on 31 December 1991, and there was an honorary consul based in the Maldives from at least 2000. Diplomatic relations continued to develop, and in February 2019 the Maldives decided in principle to establish an embassy in Russia, with Russia agreeing in July 2021 to establish a consulate-general in Malé. The first consul-general was appointed in December 2024.

== List of representatives (1957–present) ==
=== Soviet Union to Ceylon (1957–1972) ===
Name	Title	Appointment	Termination	Notes
Vladimir Yakovlev	Ambassador	19 February 1957	8 September 1960	Credentials presented on 4 May 1957
Nikolai Tarakanov	Ambassador	8 September 1960	27 March 1965	Credentials presented on 1 November 1960
Leonid Korobin	Ambassador	27 March 1965	26 July 1968	Credentials presented on 8 June 1965
Valentin Stepanov	Ambassador	26 July 1968	30 August 1970	Credentials presented on 9 September 1968
Rafiq Nishonov	Ambassador	30 August 1970	22 May 1972	Credentials presented on 12 October 1970

=== Soviet Union to Sri Lanka (1972–1991) ===
Name	Title	Appointment	Termination	Notes
Rafiq Nishonov	Ambassador	22 May 1972	8 June 1978	
Aleksey Pasyutin	Ambassador	5 September 1978	18 December 1981	Credentials presented on 9 October 1978
Boris Kirnasovsky	Ambassador	18 December 1981	19 November 1985	
Kenesh Kulmatov	Ambassador	19 November 1985	21 July 1988	
Yury Kotov	Ambassador	21 July 1988	17 August 1991	
Yury Vinogradov	Ambassador	17 August 1991	25 December 1991	

=== Russian Federation to Sri Lanka (1991–present) ===
Name	Title	Appointment	Termination	Notes
Yury Vinogradov	Ambassador	25 December 1991	25 May 1993	
Oleg Kabanov	Ambassador	25 May 1993	22 January 1998	
Viktor Zotin	Ambassador	22 January 1998	21 March 2001	
Mikhail Konarovsky	Ambassador	21 March 2001	21 February 2002	
Mikhail Karpov	Ambassador	19 June 2002	24 June 2004	
Alexey Shebarshin	Ambassador	19 January 2005	27 August 2008	
Vladimir Mikhailov	Ambassador	27 August 2008	24 August 2012	
Aleksandr Karchava	Ambassador	24 August 2012	21 August 2017	
Yury Matery	Ambassador	21 August 2017	8 September 2022	Credentials presented on 23 October 2017
Levan Dzhagaryan	Ambassador	8 September 2022		Credentials presented on 11 November 2022
