= Andrey Baykov =

Russian historian (born 1984)

- Born: Cherepovets, Russian SFSR, Soviet Union
- Education: Moscow State Institute of International Relations
- Scientific career
- Fields: International relations, political science
- Workplaces: Moscow State Institute of International Relations

Andrey Anatolievich Baykov (Russian: Андрей Анатольевич Байков; born 1984) is a Russian international relations scholar, Vice-Rector of Moscow State University of International Relations (MGIMO), editor-in-chief of the International Trends, Director of the Academic Forum on International Relations.

== Biography ==
Andrey Baykov was born in 1984 in Cherepovets and graduated from Moscow State University of International Relations in 2007, receiving Master's degree in international relations. In 2009 he was awarded the Candidate of Sciences degree (Russian PhD equivalent degree) for researching comparative regional integration in East Asia and Europe. Having developed this study, in 2012 he published his major work, Comparative Integration. He has been a Docent (Associate Professor) at MGIMO since 2013, also heading its Master's Programmes Office.

== Academic career ==
- Vice-Rector for masters and international programmes, MGIMO-University (since 2016)
- Editor-in-chief, International Trends (since 2012)
- Head, Master's Programmes Office at MGIMO (2012 - 2016)
- Director, Academic Forum on International Relations (since 2011)
- Deputy Head, Master's Programmes Office at MGIMO (2009 - 2012)
- Deputy editor-in-chief, International Trends (2008 - 2012)

Andrey Baykov worked as a visiting scholar at the George Washington University and the Free University of Berlin.

== Publications ==
Andrey Baykov has published over 80 works, including a monograph and over 10 chapters in collective monographs. These publications have included:

- Comparative Integration: Experience and Patterns of Integration in the United Europe and Asia Pacific (2012)
- Megatrends of Contemporary International Developments (2013, editor, with T. Shakleina)

He also has several publications in Literaturnaya Gazeta, Nezavisimaya Gazeta and Rossiyskaya Gazeta.

== Awards ==
- Honorary Professor of Jilin University (2016)
- Robert H. Donaldson Award, International Studies Association (2013)
- Russian Academy of Sciences Award for young scholars (2013)
- Second Prize, Russian Association of Political Science (2013)
- First Prize, Russian Association of Political Science (2009, with other authors of Contemporary World Politics)

== Private life ==
Andrey Baykov is married with three children: two daughters and a son.
