= List of ambassadors of Russia to Equatorial Guinea =

Ambassador of the Russian Federation to the Republic of Equatorial Guinea
- Emblem of the Russian Foreign Ministry
- Incumbent; Karen Chalyan since 14 June 2024
- Ministry of Foreign Affairs; Embassy of Russia in Malabo
- Style: His Excellency; The Honourable
- Reports to: Minister of Foreign Affairs
- Seat: Malabo
- Appointer: President of Russia
- Term length: At the pleasure of the president
- Website: Embassy of Russia in Equatorial Guinea

The ambassador of Russia to Equatorial Guinea is the official representative of the president and the government of the Russian Federation to the president and the government of Equatorial Guinea.

The ambassador and his staff work at large in the Russian embassy in Malabo. The current Russian ambassador to Equatorial Guinea is Karen Chalyan, incumbent since 14 June 2024.

== History of diplomatic relations ==
Diplomatic relations between the Soviet Union and Equatorial Guinea were established on 6 December 1968, shortly after the country's independence from Spain. The first ambassador, Vasily Yakubovsky, was appointed on 25 June 1969. With the dissolution of the Soviet Union in 1991, Equatorial Guinea recognised the Russian Federation as its successor state. The Russian embassy in Equatorial Guinea was closed in 1992, and since 7 August 1992, the Russian ambassador to Cameroon had dual accreditation to Equatorial Guinea. This practice continued until 14 June 2024, when Karen Chalyan was appointed the first ambassador solely accredited to Equatorial Guinea since 1992.

== List of representatives of Russia to Equatorial Guinea (1969–present) ==
=== Ambassadors of the Soviet Union to Equatorial Guinea (1969–1991) ===
Name	Title	Appointment	Termination	Notes
Vasily Yakubovsky	Ambassador	25 June 1969	3 March 1972	Credentials presented on 23 July 1969
Arkady Kazansky	Ambassador	3 March 1972	23 October 1975	Credentials presented on 8 April 1972
Vladimir Gnedykh	Ambassador	23 October 1975	23 March 1977	Credentials presented on 2 December 1975
Nikolai Belous	Ambassador	23 March 1977	15 September 1980	Credentials presented on 27 April 1977
Boris Krasnikov	Ambassador	15 September 1980	11 August 1989	Credentials presented on 9 October 1980
Lev Vakhrameyev	Ambassador	11 August 1989	25 December 1991	

=== Ambassadors of the Russian Federation to Equatorial Guinea (1991–present) ===
Name	Title	Appointment	Termination	Notes
Lev Vakhrameyev	Ambassador	25 December 1991	7 August 1992	
Vitaly Litvin	Ambassador	7 August 1992	6 February 1996	Concurrently ambassador to Cameroon
Yevgeny Utkin	Ambassador	6 February 1996	6 May 2000	Concurrently ambassador to Cameroon
Pulat Abdullayev	Ambassador	6 May 2000	24 March 2006	Concurrently ambassador to Cameroon
Stanislav Akhmedov	Ambassador	24 March 2006	28 February 2011	Concurrently ambassador to Cameroon
Nikolai Ratsiborinsky	Ambassador	28 February 2011	18 September 2017	Concurrently ambassador to Cameroon
Anatoly Bashkin	Ambassador	29 January 2018	14 November 2023	Concurrently ambassador to Cameroon; Credentials presented on 19 April 2018
Georgy Todua	Ambassador	14 December 2023	14 June 2024	Concurrently ambassador to Cameroon
Karen Chalyan	Ambassador	14 June 2024		Credentials presented on 24 October 2024
