= Petru Comendant =

Soviet-Moldovan diplomat (born 1932)

- Пётр Комендант

Soviet/Russian Ambassador to Rwanda
- In office 23 August 1990 – 11 January 1994
- President: Mikhail Gorbachev (USSR); Boris Yeltsin (Russia)
- Prime Minister: Nikolai Ryzhkov (USSR); Valentin Pavlov (USSR); Ivan Silayev (USSR); Boris Yeltsin (Russia); Viktor Chernomyrdin (Russia)
- Preceded by: Gennady Sokolov
- Succeeded by: Anatoly Smirnov

Minister of Foreign Affairs of the Moldavian SSR
- In office 29 December 1981 – 24 May 1990
- Premier: Ion Ustian; Ivan Calin; Petru Pascari
- Preceded by: Ion Ustian
- Succeeded by: Nicolae Țîu (as Minister of Foreign Affairs of SSR Moldova)

Personal details
- Born: 18 June 1932 (age 94) Chișinău, Kingdom of Romania (now Moldova)

Petru Comendant (born 18 June 1932) is a Moldovan and Soviet retired politician and diplomat. He served as the last Minister of Foreign Affairs of the Moldavian SSR.
