= Center for Global Politics =

The Center for Global Politics is an academic institute that offers several international programs and certificates at the Department of Political and Social Sciences of Freie Universität Berlin. It was founded in 2007 and is directed by Prof. Dr. Klaus Segbers. The Center for Global Politics offers the blended learning Master of Arts programs International Relations Online and East European Studies Online, the German-Chinese Graduate School of Global Politics, the one-year supplementary diploma course German Studies Russia, various Seasonal Schools and professional training certificates.

== Academic programs ==
- International Relations Online (M.A.)

International Relations (IR) Online at Freie Universität Berlin is a master’s degree for professionals wanting to pursue their studies whilst staying on the job. The program endorses a blended learning method, combining online study (90%) with in-house intensive seminar weeks in Berlin (10%). IR Online is taught exclusively in English by international academics and professionals from politics, NGOs, and businesses. The program can be studied in a full-time option (2 years) and a part-time option (4 years). It qualifies students for higher positions in governmental agencies, multinational corporations, NGOs, and international organizations.

- East European Studies Online (M.A.)

East European Studies (EES) Online is the only online Master’s program in the field of Eastern Europe. It has won the E-learning-award of the Free University of Berlin and has been ranked under the Top 10 international Masters programs in Germany by the German Academic Exchange Service and the Stifterverband für die Deutsche Wissenschaft. East European Studies online combines online study (90%) with in-house intensive seminar weeks in Berlin (10%). The program is taught exclusively in English. It can be studied in a full-time option (2 years) and a part-time option (4 years).

- Graduate School of Global Politics (PhD)

The Graduate School of Global Politics (GSGP) is the first joint doctoral program between China and Germany in the Social Sciences. It invites students to pursue their PhD in a three-year program. GSGP is offered by Freie Universität Berlin (FUB) in cooperation with four Chinese partners: Fudan University, Jinan University, Renmin University and the Shanghai Academy of Social Sciences (SASS). PhD candidates of the Graduate School of Global Politics work on dissertation topics in International Relations (IR) with an emphasis on European-Chinese relations.

- Seasonal Schools

The Global Politics Seasonal Schools are certificate programs lasting up to two weeks for students with a background in the political and social sciences. In cooperation with universities in the respective countries, Seasonal Schools in 2013are conducted in Shanghai (China), Amman (Jordan), Rhodes (Greece), Phnom Penh (Cambodia), and Teheran (Iran). The schools' curricula integrate different teaching methods – from theory-based seminars to interactive working groups, simulation games and online discussions.

- German Studies Russia

German Studies Russia is a one-year supplementary program taught in German at MGIMO (U). The program aims to provide expertise on Russia and Germany.

== Advisory board ==
Members of the Center for Global Politics advisory board are:

- Prof. Dr. Gesine Schwan, former candidate for President of the Federal Republic of Germany
- Justas Vincas Paleckis, Member of the European Parliament, Vice Chairman of the Subcommittee on Security and Defence
- Reinhard Bütikofer, Member of the European Parliament and Vice Chairman of the Alliance‘90/The Greens in the European Parliament
- Dr. Hans-Friedrich von Ploetz, Ambassador Emeritus
- Prof. Dr. Alexei Bogaturov, First Vice Rector of the Moscow State Institute of International relations
- Michael Harms, Executive Director of the German-Russian Chamber of Commerce (AHK), Moscow
- Hans-Ulrich Klose, Member of the Bundestag, SPD parliamentary group and Vice Chairman of the Committee on Foreign Affairs
- Robert Legvold, Marshall Shulman Professor Emeritus, Boston
- Hildegard Müller, General Executive Manager of the German Energy and Water Association (BDEW)
- Oliver Wieck, The Federation of German Industries (BDI), Head of the Division for International Trade and Development
- Prof. Dr. Chen Zhimin, Dean of the School of International Relations and Public Affairs (SIRPA) at Fudan University, Shanghai
- Ruprecht Polenz, Member of the Bundestag, CDU/CSU parliamentary group, Chairman of the Committee on Foreign Affairs.
