= List of ambassadors of Russia to Djibouti =

Ambassador of the Russian Federation to the Republic of Djibouti
- Emblem of the Russian Foreign Ministry
- Incumbent; Mikhail Golovanov since 24 April 2019
- Ministry of Foreign Affairs; Embassy of Russia in Djibouti City
- Style: His Excellency; The Honourable
- Reports to: Minister of Foreign Affairs
- Seat: Djibouti City
- Appointer: President of Russia
- Term length: At the pleasure of the president
- Website: Embassy of Russia in Djibouti

The ambassador of Russia to Djibouti is the official representative of the president and the government of the Russian Federation to the president and the government of Djibouti.

The ambassador and his staff work at large in the Russian embassy in Djibouti City. The current Russian ambassador to Djibouti is Mikhail Golovanov, incumbent since 24 April 2019. The Russian ambassador to Djibouti has dual accreditation as the non-resident ambassador to Somalia.

== History of diplomatic relations ==
Formal diplomatic relations between Djibouti and the Soviet Union were established on 3 April 1978. Viktor Pyoryshkin was appointed as the first ambassador on 23 November 1978. Exchange of ambassadors continued throughout the following years. With the dissolution of the Soviet Union in 1991, the incumbent Soviet ambassador, Pulat Abdullayev, continued in post as the Russian ambassador until 1995.

The Soviet Union had established diplomatic relations with Somalia in 1960, with ambassadors appointed from that year onwards. With the Somali Civil War resulting in a collapse of centralised government, the Soviet embassy was evacuated in 1991. Diplomatic relations remained broken off until being restored with the Federal Government of Somalia in 2013. Since then, the Russian ambassador to Djibouti has had dual accreditation as the non-resident ambassador to Somalia.

== List of representatives of Russia to Djibouti (1978–present) ==
=== Soviet Union to Djibouti (1978–1991) ===
Name	Title	Appointment	Termination	Notes
Viktor Pyoryshkin	Ambassador	23 November 1978	13 May 1986	Credentials presented on 19 December 1978
Viktor Zhuravlyov	Ambassador	13 May 1986	21 March 1991	
Pulat Abdullayev	Ambassador	21 March 1991	25 December 1991	

=== Russian Federation to Djibouti (1991–present) ===
Name	Title	Appointment	Termination	Notes
Pulat Abdullayev	Ambassador	25 December 1991	26 May 1995	
Mikhail Tsvigun	Ambassador	26 May 1995	5 May 1999	
Gennady Fedosov	Ambassador	19 July 1999	27 October 2003	
Aleksandr Bregadze	Ambassador	27 October 2003	20 January 2009	
Valery Orlov	Ambassador	20 January 2009	27 November 2015	Concurrently ambassador to Somalia
Sergey Kuznetsov	Ambassador	27 November 2015	4 April 2019	Credentials presented on 14 March 2016 Concurrently ambassador to Somalia
Mikhail Golovanov	Ambassador	24 April 2019		Credentials presented on 10 July 2019 Concurrently ambassador to Somalia
