= Klaus Segbers =

German political scientist

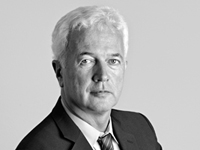
Klaus Segbers

Klaus Segbers (born 1954 in Dortmund, West Germany) is a German political scientist and professor for International Relations and East European Studies at Freie Universität Berlin. He is also the founder and director of the Center for Global Politics at Freie Universität Berlin, which offers four distinct graduate study programs designed for professionals and young leaders. His research interests include theories of international relations, transformations in the former Soviet Union, international political economy, and globalization.

== Biography ==
From 1974-1979, Segbers studied history, Slavic languages, political science, and philosophy at Ruhr University Bochum and University of Konstanz, completing his studies with both a master's degree and Staatsexamen (government-recognized exam for future teachers). In 1984, he obtained his PhD (Dr. phil.) from Bremen University with a study on the USSR during the Second World War. Segbers worked as research fellow at a project on Soviet reform politics at the University of Bremen and later as research fellow at JWG University in Frankfurt am Main. From 1990-1995, he joined Germany´s leading think tank on politics, the German Institute for International and Security Affairs at Ebenhausen and in 1992 qualified as professor with a book on systemic change in the Soviet Union. After working as professor for international relations at the University of Konstanz in 1995, Segbers became professor for political science and East European politics at the Institute for East European Studies and the Otto-Suhr-Institut at Freie Universität Berlin. He has conducted several research projects – among others one on post-Soviet puzzles (on spaces, territories, elites and interests in the FSU; published 1994/95) and one on explaining post-Soviet patchworks (1998–2000) – and has implemented as well as supervised different study projects which since 2007 are integrated in the center for global politics. Segbers is a member of several scientific boards of organizations of international repute including the German Council on Foreign Relations the Gulf Research Center, and the Institute for European Politics. As visiting scholar he has worked, amongst others, at Stanford University, George Washington University, Harvard University, Columbia University and Fudan University. He is also a member of the governing board of the European Humanities University.

== Fields of activity ==
As both Chair for Political Science at the Institute for East European Studies at Freie Universität Berlin and Professor for International Relations, Segbers' research interests cover a broad range of topics. He directed research projects on the political and societal transformations in East Europe and in the Former Soviet Union ("Post-Soviet Puzzles"; "Explaining Post Soviet Patchworks") and headed a research project "Global City Regions" (2002–2004) exploring the role of city regions as sub-state political entities within the context of contemporary globalization processes.

According to Segbers, globalization and global flows of capital, trades and services, information and people are dramatically altering the nature of politics and the opportunities for nation-states to control or influence events. "Politics can no more be masterminded, engineered, implemented, executed, organized and controlled. Politics, rather, is happening, as the result of thousands of moves by a multitude of actors on different levels of action." Segbers suggests that politicians should reduce expectations and not try to function as engineers but as moderators, or as navigators. Another proposal is to shift decision-making processes from the nation-state to the local and supranational level.

Presently, Segbers is engaged in advancing blended learning study courses as well as in fostering international academic cooperation. He is founder and director of the Center for Global Politics which unites four graduate study programs: the M.A. programs East European Studies Online (EES Online) and International Relations Online (IR Online), the Global Politics Seasonal Schools, and German Studies Russia, in cooperation with the Moscow Institute for International Relations, Moscow.

== Selected bibliography ==
- Vom Ende der Politik. Sechs Gründe warum Debatten und Beratung immer schwieriger werden. In: Internationale Politik, Februar 2013, S. 54-63.
- Debating Flinders. In: Democratic Politics, Vol. 18.1 2012, S. 28-32.
- Cities and Global Governance. New Sites for International Relations (with Mark Amen, Noah J. Toly, Patricia L. McCarney). Surrey: Ashagate, 2011.
- "Das Ende der Politik. Ein Debattenbeitrag". Spiegel Online. November 18, 2011.
- Alles fliesst – Ansätze für ein neues Politikverständnis. In: Josef Braml, Thomas Risse, Eberhard Sandschneider (Ed.). Einsatz für den Frieden. Sicherheit und Entwicklung in Räumen begrenzter Staatlichkeit. Jahrbuch Internationale Politik, Band 28, 2010, München: Oldenbourg, S. 30-34.
- Global Politics and the Collapse of the Political West Divide: The Emerging New Global Landscape. In: 20 Years After the Fall of the Berlin Wall. Singapore: KAS, 2009, S. 61 – 73.
- Riesenstädte – neue Beziehungsspiele. In: fundiert. Das Wissenschaftsmagazin der Freien Universität Berlin. 2009/01, S. 56-62.
- The making of Global City Regions. Johannesburg, Mumbai/ Bombay, São Paulo, and Shanghai (ed.), Baltimore: Johns Hopkins University Press, 2007.
- Deutsche Außenpolitik gegenüber Osteuropa: Die wichtigste Nebensache? In: Stephan Böckenförder, Chancen der deutschen Außenpolitik. Analyse – Perspektiven – Empfehlungen. Dresden: TUDpress, 2005, 150-159.
- Public Problems, Private Solutions? Globalizing Cities in the South (with Simon Raiser, Krister Volkmann – eds.), Aldershot, Burlington/VT: Ashgate, 2005.
- Resistance to Globalization. Political Struggle and Cultural Resilience in the Middle East, Russia, and Latin America (with Harald Barrios, Martin Beck, Andreas Boeckh – eds.), Hamburg, London: LIT, 2003.
- Gullivers Bindungen. Aussenpolitiken der Bundesrepublik Deutschland in den neunziger Jahren: Die innere Dimension. In: Werner Süss (Hg.), Deutschland in den neunziger Jahren. Politik und Gesellschaft zwischen Widervereinigung und Globalisierung. Opladen: Leske und Budrich, 2002, 349 – 361.
- Explaining Post-Soviet Patchworks (Ed.). Volumes 1 – 3, Aldershot: Ashgate, 2001
- Vom (großen) Nutzen und (kleinen) Elend der Komparatistik in der Transformationsforschung. In: Ulrich Menzel (Hg.), Vom Ewigen Frieden und vom Wohlstand der Nationen. Dieter Senghaas zum 60. Geburtstag. Frankfurt am Main: Suhrkamp, 2000, 493–518
- The Globalization of Eastern Europe. Teaching International Relations Without Borders (with Kersin Imbusch – eds.), Münster, Hamburg, London: Lit Verlag, 2000 (i.E.)
- Post-Soviet Puzzles. Mapping the Political Economy of the Former Soviet Union (with Stephan De Spiegeleire – eds.), 4 vls., Baden-Baden 1995.
- “The European Peace Movements, The Soviet Union and the American Left”. Telos 54 (Winter 1982-3). New York: Telos Press.
