= International Trends =

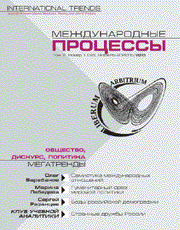
- Discipline: International relations
- Language: Russian
- Edited by: Andrey Baykov

Publication details
- History: 2002–present
- Publisher: Academic Educational Forum on International Relations (Russia)
- Frequency: Triannual

Standard abbreviations
- ISO 4: Int. Trends

Indexing
- ISSN: 1728-2756 (print); 1811-2773 (web)

Links
- Journal homepage

International Trends (Russian: Международные процессы, Mezhdunarodnye Protsessy) is a Russian peer-reviewed academic journal covering international relations theory and research methods in world politics. Founded in 2002, it is published three times a year by the Academic Educational Forum on International Relations. In 2002–2012, its edition was supported by the John D. and Catherine T. MacArthur Foundation, and since 2012 by the State Club Foundation. According to Russian Science Citation Index, the journal had a 2013 impact factor of 0.808.

The founder of the journal Alexei Bogaturov was its first editor-in-chief (2002–2012) and currently chairs the editorial board. Andrey Baykov is the current editor-in-chief.

The journal is included in the list of the Higher Attestation Commission of Russia. International Trends provides online access to its articles. According to the Higher School of Economics, International Trends was ranked in 2015 among the top-5 Russian journals in political science and had an A2 rating. According to the research published in World Economy and International Relations in 2014, 95% of the scholars polled argued that International Trends was of special importance for the progress of the Russian theory of international relations.
