= Luba Sterlikova =

Russian artist, author, and art curator

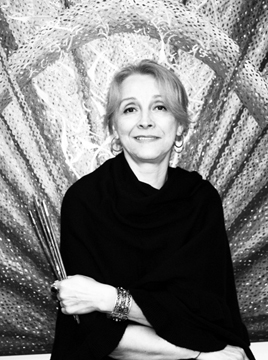
- Born: 1956 (age 69–70); Moscow, Russia, USSR
- Occupations: Artist; Author; Art Curator

Luba Sterlikova (Russian: Люба Стерликова; born 1956) is an artist, author and art curator. She is best known for her cosmic art works and poster art research. She was born in Moscow, Russia, USSR.

== Artist ==
Luba Sterlikova works in a range of mediums (oils, oil pastels, acrylics, installations, video installations) and a variety of subject matter.

"Luba Sterlikova art creates a unique model of the Universe in which time and space are not opposites as they become the inner and outer vision. The compositions of the artist, built on spiral structures, consider the reality of a multi-layer fabric. In her creative method, Luba Sterlikova uses universal optics on micro and macro space. The cosmos is energy as the plasma state of matter naturally appears in the works of the artist through stable modules that encode the matrix of life. In her artistic system, Sterlikova addresses issues of the universal understanding of the world integrity under the influence of modern theories of random processes, the development of quantum cosmology, and, in particular, a theory of Inflationary Multiverse by Andrei Linde, professor at Stanford University. At the same time, its "matrix" visual design goes to the classical traditions of avant-garde culture and to the fundamental ideas shaped by the theories of Cosmic Consciousness."

Professor Linde noted that no images could fully convey what was happening in the Universe but "the computer graphics used by physicists and the artist’s imagination, as in the works of Luba Sterlikova, could illustrate different parts of the process and make more clear the difference between a new picture of the world and what was generally accepted relatively recently".

In her work, Sterlikova has been exploring the relationship between art and science. In 2015, she created a video project What’s in Common Between Art and Science? with interviews of the scientists and artists. Among the interviewees were professors of physics and mathematics of the University of Maryland, Johns Hopkins University, Russian Academy of Sciences, art curators of the American University Museum, the National Air and Space Museum, and the Kreeger Museum. The video project was presented in the National Museum of Fine Arts of Tatarstan, Kazan, Russia (2015) and the Kazakhstan State Museum of Fine Arts, Astana, Kazakhstan.(2017)

Sterlikova's other subject matters include floral, figurative, abstract compositions, and posters.

Her floral works are often compared to those of American icon Georgia O'Keeffe.

West-Eleven magazine wrote, "A sensual energy pervades all her compositions, demanding attention and holding the viewer in thrall. While frequently compared to the work of Georgia O'Keeffe, Luba Sterlikova’s oeuvre exhibits a stylized manner completely her own and speaks of her fecund artistry."

Since 2009, Sterlikova has been collaborating with art critic and curator Vitaly Patsykov of the National Center for Contemporary Art who is best known as the co-author of the book “Forbidden Art: The Postwar Russian Avant-Garde“. He was a big influence on the artist's path to cosmic art.

Sterlikova's works are in the art collections of the National Air and Space Museum, Washington, D.C.; the National Museum of the Republic of Kazakhstan, Astana, Kazakhstan; Bakhrushin Museum, Moscow, Russia; the National Museum of Fine Arts of Tatarstan, Kazan, Russia; the Copelouzos Family Art Museum, Athens, Greece; the State Art Museum, Khanty-Mansiysk, Russia; and the Russian State Library, as well as in private collections in the US, UK, Russia, France, Germany, and China.

Sterlikova exhibited in galleries and museums in the United States, Great Britain, China, France, Italy, India, Egypt, Spain, and Russia, including a collective exhibit Poster: Artist and Time at the Tretyakov Gallery, Moscow, Russia, solo exhibitions Multidimensions at the All-Russian Museum of Decorative Arts, Moscow, Russia, Genetic Code of the Universe at the State Museum of Fine Arts of the Republic of Tatarstan, Kazan, Russia, and Universe: Genetic Code at the National Museum of the Republic of Kazakhstan, Astana, Kazakhstan.

== Author ==
Sterlikova is the author of Street Artist. Century of the Entertainment Poster, a comprehensive research that "explores the evolution of the entertainment poster starting with the birth of the artistic affiches at the end of the 19th century, and analyzes posters of various genres including operetta, cabaret, dance, drama theater, and circus".

Sterlikova’s book Posters and Their Stories was published by Cultural Initiative East-West in 2026.

Since 2014, she has been writing a column about the history of theatrical posters for The Stage magazine, published by the Bakhrushin Museum.

As a free-lance lecturer, Sterlikova runs programs on poster art history at various venues. Her poster art projects included docent education at the Kreeger Museum and the American University Museum in Washington, DC, National University of Arts, Astana, Kazakhstan, and Embassy of Austria in the US.

In 2017, Sterlikova presented her paper Posters: Constructing Soviet Identity at the International Conference Art Born in the Revolution: Russian Art and the State 1917-1932 . The conference was organized by the Royal Academy of Arts and the Courtauld Institute of Art, London, UK in conjunction with the Revolution exhibition at the Royal Academy of Arts.

Sterlikova was a speaker at the International conference Philosophy and Psychology of the Theatrical Poster at the Russian Academy of Theatre Arts (GITIS), Moscow, Russia in 2015.

Sterlikova wrote a script for a 4-part documentary Poster - Document of History . It was aired in April 2022 on the Kultura TV channel.

== Art curator ==
Among Sterlikova's projects as an art curator are the exhibitions The Posters Come Alive (2016, co-author of the catalogue), The Poster Died. Long Live the Poster! (2019, co-author of the catalogue), and Flight as a Dream (2021, co-author of the catalogue) at the Bakhrushin Museum, Moscow, Russia.

As an advocate of art without borders, in 2008, Sterlikova founded an art project Inspired by Russia which was designed to promote the international artists whose works were influenced by Russian culture. The project held a series of exhibitions in Washington, DC, United States (Embassy of Russia and the Russian Cultural Center, 2008), Moscow, Russia (the Solzhenitsyn Museum of Compatriots, 2009 and the Russian Academy of Arts, 2013); Paris, France (Centennial of Sasson Russe within a week long program Art Without Borders, 2009), London, UK (Pushkin House, London, 2010), and Khanty Mansijsk, Russia (State Museum of Fine Arts, 2011).

In her efforts to promote art as a unifying element in a social context, in 2011, Sterlikova started a social initiative MGIMO-Art that presented works by the university alumni and supported charitable efforts of the MGIMO University. In 2017, the project developed into an Art Festival with exhibitions, short film screenings, a series of lectures, and talks about art.

Since 2018, Sterlikova has been collaborating in the art related programs with the US chapter of the Mentor Foundation founded by Queen Silvia of Sweden with a purpose of "preventing youth substance use and promote health and well-being."

A graduate of the Moscow State Institute of International Relations (MGIMO) (1978), Sterlikova holds PhD in History from the Plekhanov Russian University of Economics (1995).
