= Olga Yakovlevna Ivanova =

Russian diplomat

Olga Ivanova
- Ольга Иванова

Russian Ambassador to Mauritius
- In office 12 February 2004 – 20 April 2011
- President: Vladimir Putin; Dmitry Medvedev
- Preceded by: Valery Nesterushkin
- Succeeded by: Vyacheslav Nikiforov

Personal details
- Born: 6 June 1945 (age 81)
- Education: MGIMO

Olga Yakovlevna Ivanova (Russian: Ольга Яковлевна Иванова; born 1945) is a career diplomat who was the Ambassador Extraordinary and Plenipotentiary of the Russian Federation to the Republic of Mauritius.

Ivanova graduated from the Moscow State Institute of International Relations in 1968, and worked in various diplomatic posts in the central offices of the USSR Ministry of Foreign Affairs and abroad. From 1992 – 1995 Ivanova worked in the Department of International Humanitarian and Cultural Cooperation of the Russian Ministry of Foreign Affairs, and from 1995 – 1999 was an adviser at the Permanent Mission of Russia to UNESCO in Paris, France.

In February 2004, Ivanova was appointed as Ambassador of Russia to Mauritius.

Retired in 2011.

Ivanova speaks Russian, English, and Arabic.
