= Andrei Polyakov =

Soviet and Russian diplomat (1950–2021)

- Андрей Поляков

Ambassador of Russia to Rwanda
- In office 22 May 2013 – 31 October 2017
- Preceded by: Mirgayas Shirinsky
- Succeeded by: Karen Chalyan

Ambassador of Russia to Tunisia
- In office 11 April 2006 – 14 January 2011
- Preceded by: Aleksei Podtserob
- Succeeded by: Aleksandr Shein

Personal details
- Born: 14 October 1950 Moscow, Russian Soviet Federative Socialist Republic, USSR
- Died: 3 March 2021 (aged 70)
- Education: Moscow State Institute of International Relations; Diplomatic Academy of the Ministry of Foreign Affairs of the USSR
- Awards: Order of the Badge of Honour; Decoration For Impeccable Service Thirty Years

Andrei Vladimirovich Polyakov (Russian: Андрей Владимирович Поляков; 14 October 1950 – 3 March 2021) was a Soviet and Russian diplomat. He served in various diplomatic roles from 1973 onwards, and served as Ambassador of Russia to Tunisia and to Rwanda.

== Career ==
Polyakov was born on 14 October 1950 in Moscow, then part of the Russian Soviet Federative Socialist Republic, in the Soviet Union. He studied at Moscow State Institute of International Relations, graduating in 1973, and entered diplomatic service. He undertook further studies later in his career at the Diplomatic Academy of the Ministry of Foreign Affairs of the USSR, graduating in 1987 as a Candidate of Historical Sciences. His early diplomatic service was divided between positions in the central Ministry of Foreign Affairs, and in the embassies of the USSR, and later Russia, in Sudan, Lebanon, and Egypt.

Between 1999 and 2001 Polyakov was Counselor-Minister at the Russian embassy in Lebanon, followed by a return to Russia and a posting between 2002 and 2004 as Senior Adviser, Head of Section in the Department of the Middle East and North Africa at the Russian Foreign Ministry. In 2004 he became the department's deputy director, being appointed to the diplomatic rank of Envoy Extraordinary and Plenipotentiary Second Class on 7 May 2005. He left this post in 2006, and on 11 April 2006 was appointed ambassador of Russia to Tunisia. He presented his credentials on 29 June 2006, and remained ambassador until 14 January 2011. During this time he was promoted to Envoy Extraordinary and Plenipotentiary First Class on 11 March 2009. On 22 May 2013 Polyakov was appointed ambassador of Russia to Rwanda, a post he held until his retirement on 31 October 2017. He had been promoted to Ambassador Extraordinary and Plenipotentiary towards the end of the assignment, on 10 February 2016. During his time as he helped arranged the visit of Rwandan Minister of Foreign Affairs, Louise Mushikiwabo, to Russia. This was the first time a Rwandan Minister of Foreign Affairs had visited the country.

Polyakov died on 3 March 2021. He was married, with two sons. Over his career he had received several awards and honours, including the Order of the Badge of Honour in 1982, and the Decoration For Impeccable Service Thirty Years on 9 February 2011. His obituary by the Russian Ministry of Foreign Affairs described him as "an experienced and highly professional diplomat who made a great contribution to the development of bilateral relations, the implementation of the course pursued by Russia to strengthen diverse ties with the countries of the Middle East and Africa, a reliable comrade and mentor."
