= Georgiy Rudov =

Russian diplomat (1939–2021)

- Георгий Рудов
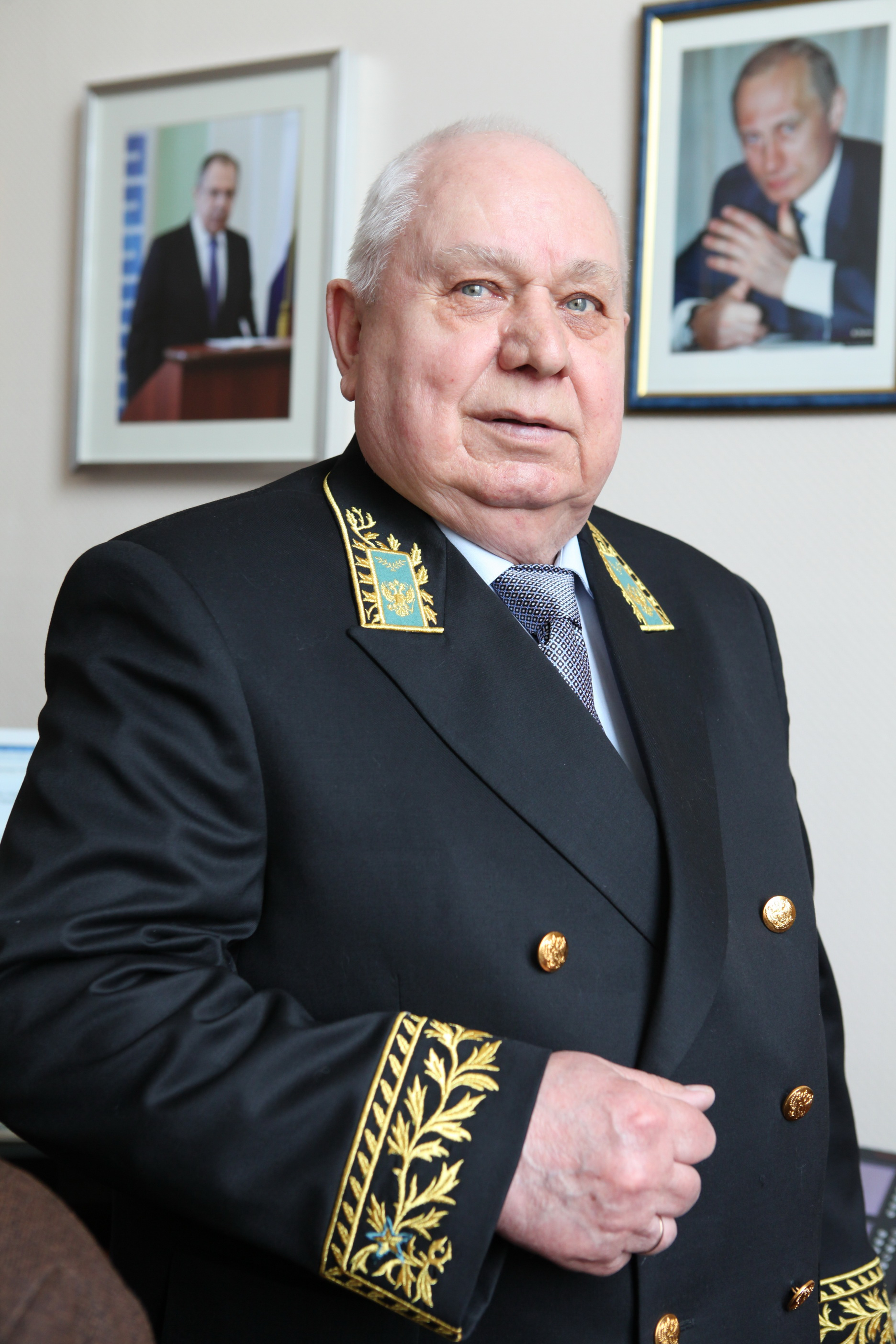
- Rudov in 2016

Soviet Union Ambassador to Laos
- In office 9 October 1990 – 26 December 1991
- President: Mikhail Gorbachev
- Preceded by: Yuri Mikheev
- Succeeded by: Position abolished

Russian Ambassador to Laos
- In office 26 December 1991 – 6 April 1993
- President: Boris Yeltsin
- Preceded by: Position established
- Succeeded by: Vladimir Fedotov

Russian Ambassador to Kyrgyzstan
- In office 14 January 1997 – 14 August 2002
- President: Boris Yeltsin; Vladimir Putin
- Preceded by: Mikhail Romanov
- Succeeded by: Yevgeny Shmagin

Personal details
- Born: 1 May 1939 Sergeyevka, South Kazakhstan Region, Kazakh SSR, Soviet Union
- Died: 14 November 2021 (aged 82)

Georgiy Alekseyevich Rudov (Russian: Гео́ргий Алексе́евич Ру́дов; 1 May 1939 – 14 November 2021) was a Russian diplomat. He served as Ambassador of the Soviet Union and later Russia to Laos from 1990 to 1993 and Ambassador of Russia to Kyrgyzstan from 1997 to 2002.
