= Alexander Polyakov (diplomat) =

Russian diplomat

Alexander Dmitriyevich Polyakov (Russian: Александр Дмитриевич Поляков) (born 19 April 1959) is a Russian diplomat.

Polyakov graduated from the Moscow State Institute of International Relations in 1981 and entered the service of the Soviet Ministry of Foreign Affairs in the same year. He held various positions in the central offices of the Ministry and the Embassy in Budapest, where from 2000—2004 he was Senior Adviser, Minister-Counsellor. From December 2004 to 9 June 2008, he was Deputy Director of the Third European Department at the Russian Ministry of Foreign Affairs.

On 10 June 2008, Polyakov was appointed by Russian president Dmitry Medvedev as Ambassador of Russia to Nigeria, and he presented his Letters of Credence to Nigerian president Umaru Yar'Adua on 4 December 2008. He has 2 children Mary and Vladimir and a wife Marina.
