= Pulat Abdullayev =

Russian career diplomat

- Пулат Абдуллаев
- Born: January 16, 1942 (age 84)
- Education: Moscow State Institute of International Relations
- Occupations: Career diplomat, writer

Pulat Habibovich Abdullayev (Russian: Пулат Хабибович Абдуллаев; born 16 January 1942) is a Russian career diplomat.

Abdullayev graduated from the Moscow State Institute of International Relations in 1966, and went on to work in various diplomatic posts in the central offices of the Ministry of Foreign Affairs and abroad.

From 1991 to 26 May 1995, Abdullayev was the Ambassador of Russia to Djibouti. When the Russian Federation formed in 1993, he was promoted to the rank of Ambassador Extraordinary and Plenipotentiary of the Russian Federation by Boris Yeltsin on October 18, 1993. He left that post on May 26, 1995.

Serving as the lead advisor of the Department of Security and Disarmament of the Russian Ministry of Foreign Affairs (1995–2000), Abdullayev represented the Russian Federation at the Disarmament Commission of the United Nations. He led the team of Russian diplomats responsible for Safeguards, Transparency and Irreversibility talks with the United States on the exchange of information on disarmament. In April 1999, he testified before the Commission that the NATO incursion in the Balkans would be detrimental for the progress of ratifying the 1993 START II arms treaty.

From May 26, 2000, to March 24, 2006, Abdullayev was the Ambassador of Russia to Cameroon, with concurrent accreditation to Equatorial Guinea.

In 2002, Abdullayev was awarded the Order of Honor.

An honorary member of the Belgian Royal Society of Napoleonic Research, under the pseudonym A. Platov, Abdullayev's book So Said Napoleon (Russian: Так говорил Наполеон) was published in 2003.

== Personal life ==
Abdullayev speaks Russian, English and French, and he is married with two children.

== Works ==
- So Said Napoleon (Russian: Так говорил Наполеон) - ISBN 5-03-003548-6
