= Alexei Bogaturov =

Russian international relations scholar (born 1954)

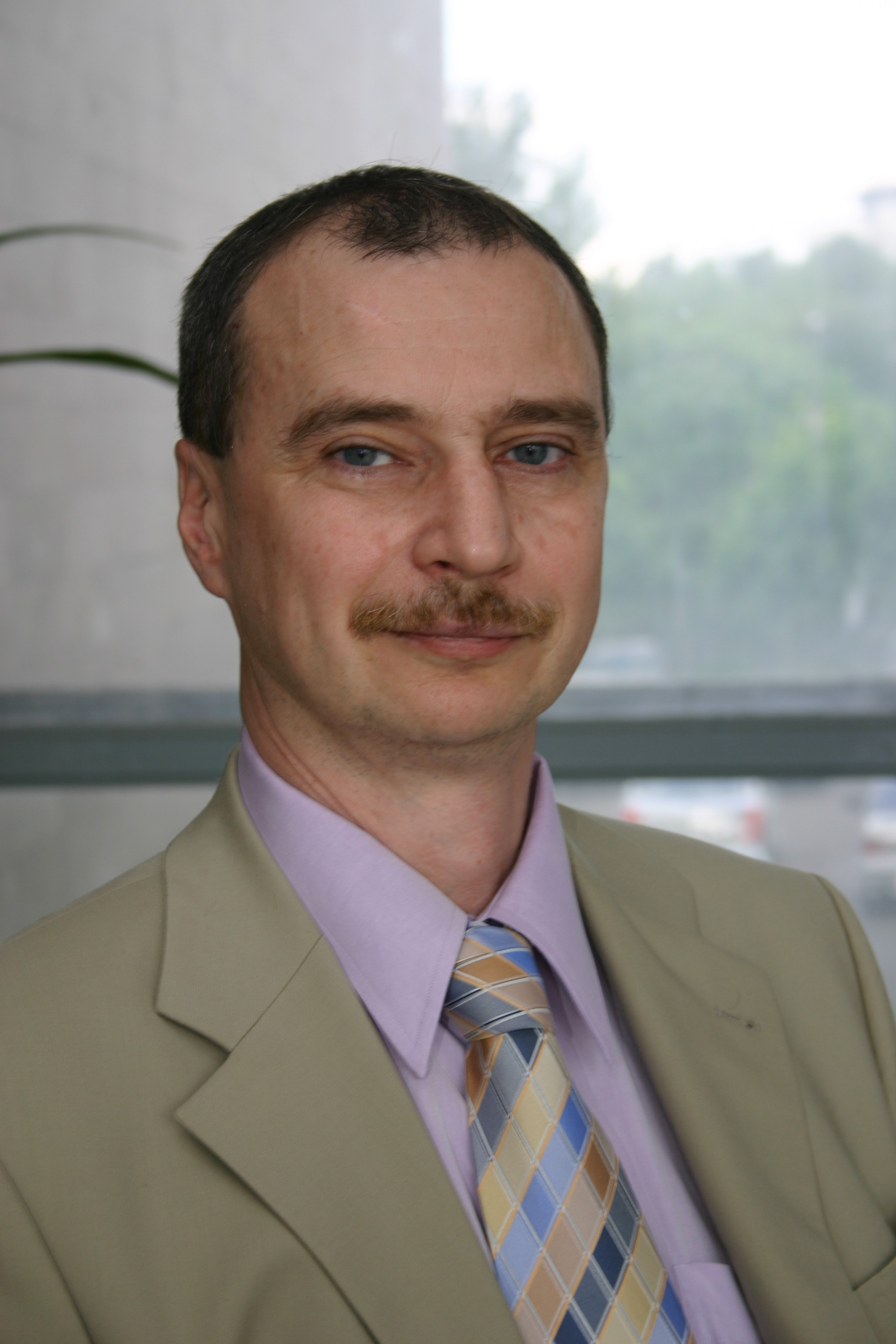
- Born: 24 May 1954 (age 72); Nalchik, Russian SFSR, Soviet Union
- Education: Moscow State Institute of International Relations
- Awards: Distinguished Scholar of Russia
- Scientific career
- Fields: International relations, Political Science
- Workplaces: Moscow State Institute of International Relations

Alexei Demosfenovich Bogaturov (Russian: Алексей Демосфенович Богатуров; born 24 May 1954) is a Russian international relations scholar, chairman of the International Trends editorial board, President of the Academic Forum on International Relations, Distinguished Scholar of Russia. He is an advisory board member of the Center for Global Politics, Berlin, Germany.

He served as Provost of Moscow State Institute of International Relations (2010–2012), editor-in-chief of the International Trends (2002–2012), director of the Academic Educational Forum on International Relations (2000–2011). In 2003 - 2006 he was a Nezavisimaya Gazeta columnist. According to Google Scholar, Alexei Bogaturov has a h-index of 11.

== Biography ==
Alexei Bogaturov was born in 1954 in Nalchik and graduated from Moscow State University of International Relations (MGIMO) in 1976. In 1983 he was awarded the Candidate of Sciences degree for researching the role of energy imports in shaping the foreign policy of Japan. In 1996 he was awarded the Doctor of Sciences degree for a dissertation on USSR - US (Russia - US) relations in East Asia in 1945 - 1995. This research resulted in his major work, The Great Powers at the Pacific Ocean (1945 - 1995), published in 1997. He has been a MGIMO Professor since 1999.

== Academic career ==
- Chairman, International Trends editorial board (since 2012)
- President, Academic Forum on International Relations (since 2011)
- Provost, MGIMO (2010 - 2012)
- Editor-in-chief, International Trends (2002 - 2012)
- Director, Academic Forum on International Relations (2000 - 2011)
- Vice Rector for Educational Program Development, MGIMO (2007 - 2010)
- Associate Director, Institute of International Security Studies (2004 - 2013)
- Associate Director, Institute for US and Canadian Studies (2000 - 2003)
- Dean, MGIMO Faculty of Political Science (2006 - 2007)
- Department Head, MGIMO Academic Department of International Problems' Applied Analysis (2006 - 2007)

Alexei Bogaturov also worked at Moscow State University, Institute of World Economy and International Relations, Institute of Far Eastern Studies.

He also held teaching and research positions at Columbia University, Princeton University and Brookings Institution.

== Selected publications ==
As of 2013, Alexei Bogaturov has published more than 200 works with over 500 citations in peer-reviewed journals and books. Among these publications, there are 4 monographs and 20 chapters in collective monographs published in Russia, US, Japan, Germany, France, South Korea and Italy. His publications have included:

- The Great Powers at the Pacific Ocean (1945 - 1995) (1997)
- Essays on the Theory and Political Analysis of International Relations (2002, together with N. Kosolapov and M. Khrustalev)
- Systemic History of International Relations. 1918 - 2003, in 4 vol. (2000 - 2003, editor)
- Economy and Politics in Contemporary International Conflicts (2008, editor)
- Contemporary World Politics (2009, editor)
- International Relations in Central Asia (2011, editor)
- International Relations and Russian Foreign Policy (2017)

== Awards ==
- Decoration of Honour of the Security Council of Russia (2012)
- Russian Government Prize in Education (2011)
- Distinguished Scholar of Russia (2009)
- First Prize for Academic Research, Russian Association of Political Science (2008)
- Eugene Tarle Prize, Russian Academy of Sciences (2006)
- Annual Prize, International Affairs (1996)
- Honorary Prize of the USSR Ministry of Foreign Affairs (1991)

== Personal life ==
Alexei Bogaturov is married.
