= Nikolay Udovichenko =

Russian diplomat

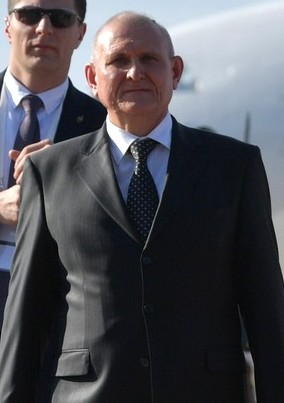
Udovichenko in 2019

Nikolay Nikolayevich Udovichenko (born 1962) is a Russian diplomat and was the former Ambassador of the Russian Federation to the Federal Republic of Nigeria.

== Education ==
Udovichenko attended the Moscow State Institute of International Relations (MGIMO). He graduated in 1984 and was subsequently recruited by the Ministry of Foreign Affairs.

== Career ==
Between 2005 and 2013, he held the position of Deputy Head of the 2nd CIS Department of the MFA of Russia. On 1 April 2013, he became the Ambassador Extraordinary and Plenipotentiary of the Russian Federation to the Federal Republic of Nigeria.

== Personal life ==
Udovichenko speaks English and Hungarian fluently. He is married with two children, an adult son and daughter.

== See also ==
- Nigeria–Russia relations
- List of ambassadors of Russia to Nigeria
