= Vladimir Snegiryov =

Russian physician and gynecologist

- Владимир Снегирёв
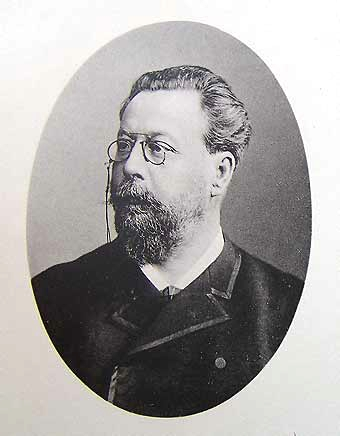
- Born: 9 July 1847; Moscow, Russian Empire
- Died: 19 December 1916 (aged 69); Moscow, Russian Empire
- Education: Moscow Imperial University
- Occupations: Physician, gynecologist, professor
- Known for: Founding father of scientific clinical gynecology in Russia

Vladimir Fedorovich Snegiryov (Russian: Владимир Фёдорович Снегирёв; 9 July [O.S. 27 June] 1847 – 19 December 1916) was a pioneering Russian physician, surgeon, and professor considered one of the founding fathers of scientific clinical gynecology in the Russian Empire. He established specialized gynecological clinics, developed novel surgical techniques, and advanced medical education for women.

== Early life and education ==
Snegiryov was born in Moscow into the family of a civil servant and was orphaned at an early age. He attended school in Moscow and later studied at the Kronstadt Navigation School. With the financial support of the Russian philanthropist Pavel Shelaputin, Snegiryov enrolled in the Medical Faculty of Moscow Imperial University in 1865, graduating with honors in 1870.

== Medical career ==
After completing his studies, Snegiryov worked at the Yauza Hospital and the Moscow Maternity Hospital. In 1871, during an outbreak of cholera in the Podolsk district of Moscow Governorate, he served as a zemstvo physician providing sanitation and relief.

In 1873, Snegiryov defended his doctoral dissertation on pelvic hematocele and the necessity of surgical intervention in gynecological disorders. He joined the faculty of Moscow Imperial University as a docent and delivered the university's first specialized lecture course on ovariotomy. In 1884, he published Uterine Bleeding, Their Etiology, Diagnosis, and Therapy, which became the standard foundational reference on clinical gynecology in Russia. He was appointed full professor at Moscow University in 1885.

In 1887, Snegiryov co-founded and chaired the Moscow Society of Obstetricians and Gynecologists. He oversaw the opening of a model university gynecological clinic in 1889, which was notable for admitting women doctors to train and practice, and founded the Institute for Advanced Training of Gynecologists in 1896, leading it until his death. Over the course of his career, he performed approximately 5,000 operations, introducing innovations in colpopoiesis, vaginal fixation, and surgical management of uterine fibroids.

Snegiryov also maintained a summer clinic in the town of Aleksin, expanding the local district hospital at his own expense and providing free surgical care to rural residents.

== Death and legacy ==
Snegiryov died of pneumonia on 19 December 1916 in Moscow.

Several medical institutions in Russia are named in his honor:

- V. F. Snegiryov Maternity Hospital No. 6 in Saint Petersburg
- The Clinic of Obstetrics and Gynecology at Sechenov University in Moscow
- The Aleksinskaya District Hospital No. 1 in Tula Oblast
