= 2025 Tambov Oblast head election =

| ← 2022 | 12–14 September 2025 | 2030 → |
- Turnout: 53.94% ▼0.69 pp
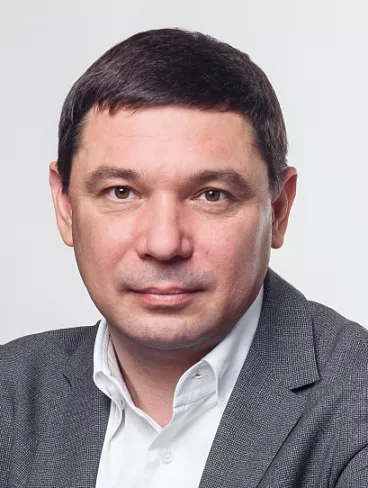
| | | CPRF |
| Candidate | Yevgeny Pervyshov | Andrey Zhidkov |
| Party | United Russia | CPRF |
| Popular vote | 311,028 | 41,826 |
| Percentage | 73.84% | 9.93% |
| | SR–ZP | LDPR |
| Candidate | Pavel Plotnikov | Oleg Morozov |
| Party | SR–ZP | LDPR |
| Popular vote | 22,957 | 22,940 |
| Percentage | 5.45% | 5.45% |
Head before election
Yevgeny Pervyshov (acting)
United Russia
Head-elect
Yevgeny Pervyshov
United Russia

The 2025 Tambov Oblast head election took place on 12–14 September 2025, on common election day. Acting Head of Tambov Oblast Yevgeny Pervyshov was elected for a full term in office.

== Background ==
Deputy Minister of Construction, Housing and Utilities of Russia Maksim Yegorov was appointed acting Head of Administration of Tambov Oblast in October 2021, replacing two-term incumbent Aleksandr Nikitin, who in turn was appointed to the Federation Council by Tambov Oblast Duma. Yegorov overwhelmingly won election for a full term in September 2022 with 84.95% of the vote.

On November 4, 2024, Yegorov unexpectedly announced his resignation as Head of Tambov Oblast with two years of his first term left. Yegorov did not have any complaints about his performance as governor, so it was widely believed that Yegorov would receive a major job offer on the federal level, potentially as United Russia executive committee head, as his former boss Vladimir Yakushev was tapped acting secretary general of United Russia earlier in 2024 (nonetheless, Yegorov did not land any position at the party congress in December 2024). The same day President of Russia Vladimir Putin appointed State Duma member and former Krasnodar mayor Yevgeny Pervyshov as acting Head of Tambov Oblast.

== Candidates ==
In Tambov Oblast candidates for Head of Tambov Oblast can be nominated only by registered political parties. Candidate for Head of Tambov Oblast should be a Russian citizen and at least 30 years old. Candidates for Head of Tambov Oblast should not have a foreign citizenship or residence permit. Each candidate in order to be registered is required to collect at least 7% of signatures of members and heads of municipalities. Also head candidates present 3 candidacies to the Federation Council and election winner later appoints one of the presented candidates.

=== Declared ===
| Candidate name, political party | | Occupation | Status | Ref. |
|---|---|---|---|---|
| Oleg Morozov; Liberal Democratic Party | | Member of Tambov Oblast Duma (2021–present); 2022 head candidate | Registered | |
| Yevgeny Pervyshov; United Russia | Yevgeny Pervyshov | Acting Head of Tambov Oblast (2024–present); Former Member of State Duma (2021–2024) | Registered | |
| Pavel Plotnikov; SR–ZP | | Member of Tambov Oblast Duma (2005–2011, 2016–present); 2020 and 2022 head candidate | Registered | |
| Yelena Semiletova; New People | | Businesswoman | Registered | |
| Andrey Zhidkov; Communist Party | | Member of Tambov Oblast Duma (2016–present); 2015, 2020 and 2022 head candidate | Registered | |

=== Eliminated in the primary ===
- Sergey Khaustov (United Russia), Member of Tambov Oblast Duma (2011–present)

=== Candidates for Federation Council ===
Incumbent Senator Mikhail Belousov (Independent) was not re-nominated.

| Head candidate, political party | Candidates for Federation Council | Status |
|---|---|---|
| Oleg Morozov; Liberal Democratic Party | * Denis Dubovitsky, homemaker * Vladimir Rodin, Member of Rasskazovo City Council of People's Deputies (2020–present) * Konstantin Susakov, aide to State Duma member Sergey Leonov | Registered |
| Yevgeny Pervyshov; United Russia | * Aleksey Kondratyev, Senator from Kursk Oblast (2024–present), former Senator from Tambov Oblast (2015–2020) * Vladimir Repin, Commissioner for Human Rights of Tambov Oblast (2014–present) * Vladimir Romanov, Member of Civic Chamber of the Russian Federation (2017–present), Tambov State University history professor | Registered |
| Pavel Plotnikov; SR–ZP | * Sergey Kunavin * Aleksandr Menshikh, Member of Kotovsk City Council of People's Deputies (2020–present), middle school principal * Irina Zhukova, self-employed | Registered |
| Yelena Semiletova; New People | * Yelena Kuzovleva, individual entrepreneur * Tatyana Yevtina, individual entrepreneur * Igor Yuryev, individual entrepreneur | Registered |
| Andrey Zhidkov; Communist Party | * Yelena Kozodayeva, aide to State Duma member Georgy Kamnev * Larisa Popova, former Member of Komsomolsky Rural Council of People's Deputies (2013–2018), aide to Tambov Oblast Duma member * Anton Veselovsky, Member of Tambov Oblast Duma (2021–present) | Registered |

== Polls ==
| Fieldwork date | Polling firm | Pervyshov | Zhidkov | Plotnikov | Morozov | Semiletova | Lead |
|---|---|---|---|---|---|---|---|
| 14 September 2025 | 2025 election | 73.8 | 9.9 | 5.5 | 5.5 | 4.0 | 63.9 |
| 9–22 August 2025 | FOM | 80.1 | 7.5 | 5.5 | 3.6 | 2.3 | 72.6 |

== Results ==
Summary of the 12–14 September 2025 Tambov Oblast head election results
| Candidate | Party | Votes | % |
|---|---|---|---|
| Yevgeny Pervyshov (incumbent) | United Russia | 311,028 | 73.84 |
| Andrey Zhidkov | Communist Party | 41,826 | 9.93 |
| Pavel Plotnikov | A Just Russia – For Truth | 22,957 | 5.45 |
| Oleg Morozov | Liberal Democratic Party | 22,940 | 5.45 |
| Yelena Semiletova | New People | 16,960 | 4.03 |
| Valid votes | | 415,711 | 98.70 |
| Blank ballots | | 5,492 | 1.30 |
| Total | | 421,203 | 100.00 |
| Turnout | | 421,203 | 53.94 |
| Registered voters | | 780,852 | 100.00 |

Governor Pervyshov appointed outgoing Senator from Kursk Oblast Aleksey Kondratyev (United Russia) to the Federation Council, replacing incumbent Senator Mikhail Belousov (Independent).

== See also ==
- 2025 Russian regional elections
