= 2022 Tambov Oblast gubernatorial election =

| ← 2020 | 9–11 September 2022 | 2025 → |
- Turnout: 57.87%
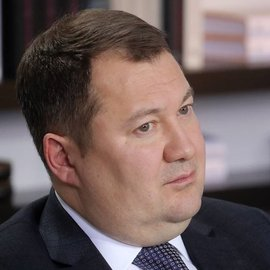
| | | CPRF |
| Nominee | Maksim Yegorov | Andrey Zhidkov |
| Party | United Russia | CPRF |
| Popular vote | 398,054 | 31,737 |
| Percentage | 84.95% | 6.77% |
Head before election
Maksim Yegorov (acting)
United Russia
Elected Head
Maksim Yegorov
United Russia

The 2022 Tambov Oblast gubernatorial election took place on 9–11 September 2022, on common election day. Acting Governor Maksim Yegorov was elected to a full term.

== Background ==
Aleksandr Nikitin served as Head of Administration of Tambov Oblast since 2015, replacing 15-year incumbent Oleg Betin. That year, Nikitin won the election for a full term with 85.47% of the vote. Nikitin won a second term in 2020 with 79.30% of the vote. Despite modest economic achievements, Nikitin's term was marked by poor consolidation of regional elite, which resulted in several setbacks for the administration. One of them was United Russia's defeat in the 2020 Tambov City Duma elections, when Rodina, affiliated with former Tambov Mayor Maksim Kosenkov won 26 seats out of 36. On 4 October 2021 Nikitin resigned just one year into his second term, Deputy Minister of Construction Maksim Yegorov was appointed acting Head of Administration of Tambov Oblast. Nikitin was appointed to the Federation Council by Tambov Oblast Duma on 7 October.

Due to the start of the Russian invasion of Ukraine in February 2022 and subsequent economic sanctions, the cancellation and postponement of direct gubernatorial elections was proposed. The measure was even supported by A Just Russia leader Sergey Mironov. Eventually, on 7 June Tambov Oblast Duma called the gubernatorial election for 11 September 2022.

== Candidates ==
Only political parties can nominate candidates for gubernatorial election in Tambov Oblast, self-nomination is not possible. However, candidates are not obliged to be members of the nominating party. Candidate for Head of Administration of Tambov Oblast should be a Russian citizen and at least 30 years old. Each candidate in order to be registered is required to collect at least 7% of signatures of members and heads of municipalities. Also, gubernatorial candidates present 3 candidacies to the Federation Council and election winner later appoints one of the presented candidates.

=== Registered ===
- Sergey Malinkovich (Communists of Russia), Member of Altai Krai Legislative Assembly, chair of Communists of Russia party, 2014 Nenets AO gubernatorial candidate
- Oleg Morozov (LDPR), Member of Tambov Oblast Duma
- Pavel Plotnikov (SR-ZP), Member of Tambov Oblast Duma, 2020 gubernatorial candidate
- Maksim Yegorov (United Russia), acting Head of Administration of Tambov Oblast, former Deputy Minister of Construction, Housing and Utilities (2018-2021)
- Andrey Zhidkov (CPRF), Member of Tambov Oblast Duma, 2015 and 2020 gubernatorial candidate

== Results ==
Summary of the 9–11 September 2022 Tambov Oblast gubernatorial election results
| Candidate | Party | Votes | % |
|---|---|---|---|
| Maksim Yegorov (incumbent) | United Russia | 398,054 | 84.95 |
| Andrey Zhidkov | Communist Party | 31,737 | 6.77 |
| Pavel Plotnikov | A Just Russia — For Truth | 15,538 | 3.32 |
| Oleg Morozov | Liberal Democratic Party | 11,351 | 2.42 |
| Sergey Malinkovich | Communists of Russia | 7,161 | 1.53 |
| Valid votes | | 463,841 | 98.98 |
| Blank ballots | | 4,760 | 1.02 |
| Total | | 468,601 | 100.00 |
| Turnout | | 468,601 | 57.87 |
| Registered voters | | 809,704 | 100.00 |

Incumbent Senator Mikhail Belousov (Independent) was re-appointed to the Federation Council.

== See also ==
- 2022 Russian gubernatorial elections
