= Alexander Babakov =

Russian politician (born 1963)

Alexander Babakov MP
- Александр Бабаков
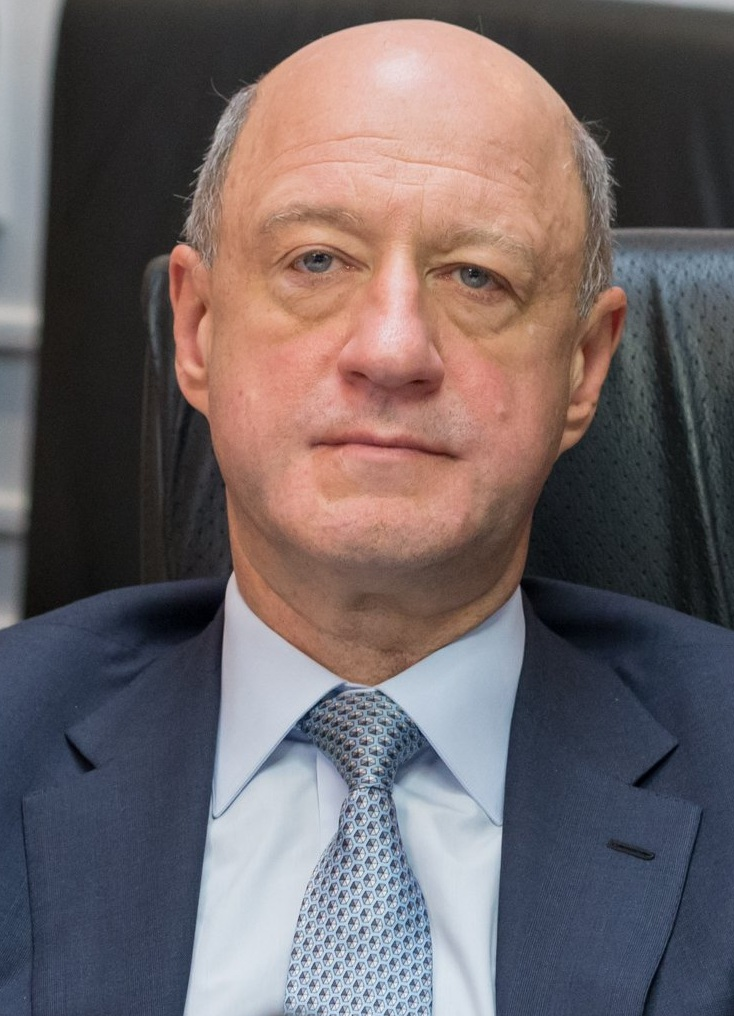
- Babakov in 2019

Member of the State Duma (Party List Seat)
- Incumbent
- Assumed office 12 October 2021
- In office 29 December 2003 – 5 October 2016

Chairman of Sovintern
- Incumbent
- Assumed office April 27 2026
- Preceded by: Position established

Russian Federation Senator for Tambov Oblast
- In office 22 September 2020 – 12 October 2021
- Nominated by: Head of Tambov Oblast
- Preceded by: Aleksey Kondratyev
- Succeeded by: Mikhail Belousov

Russian Federation Senator for Tambov Oblast
- In office 28 September 2016 – 22 September 2020
- Nominated by: Tambov Oblast Duma
- Preceded by: Nikolay Kosarev
- Succeeded by: Svetlana Korostelyova

Vice Chairman of the State Duma
- In office 24 December 2007 – 21 December 2011
- Chairman: Boris Gryzlov

2nd Chairman of Rodina
- In office 24 March 2006 – 28 October 2006
- Preceded by: Dmitry Rogozin
- Succeeded by: Aleksey Zhuravlyov

Personal details
- Born: 8 February 1963 (age 63) Chișinău, Moldavian SSR, Soviet Union
- Party: A Just Russia - For Truth
- Education: Moscow State University

Alexander Mikhailovich Babakov (Russian: Александр Михайлович Бабаков; 8 February 1963) is a Russian politician and member of the State Duma, the Russian parliament. He was appointed Special Presidential Representative to Russians abroad by Vladimir Putin in 2012.

He has been under EU, Canadian and Swiss sanctions since 2014, as well as US sanctions since 2017.

== Political activity ==
He is a member of the Foreign Affairs Committee, Deputy Co-chairman of Inter-Parliamentary Group of the Russian Federation, Head of Delegation of the State Duma in the Inter-Parliamentary Union and Chairman of State Duma Commission on legal support to military and defense industrial complex of the Russian Federation. He was appointed Deputy speaker of the Duma in 2010, a position he held until December 2011.

In June 2012 he was appointed as Presidential Envoy for engaging with Russian organizations abroad by President Putin.

He was the leader of Rodina, a political party in Russia, for several months in 2006 and organised the formation of A Just Russia, a merger between Rodina, the Russian Party of Life and the Russian Pensioners' Party, sitting on its governing committee.

Between 2006 and 2007 he led A Just Russia's faction in the State Duma as the party leader, Sergei Mironov, served as speaker of the Federation Council of Russia.

He was elected to the Russian State Duma in 2003 and became party leader of Rodina in March 2006 following the surprise resignation of Dmitry Rogozin.

== Sanctions and legal action ==
In September 2014, following the Annexation of Crimea by the Russian Federation and the wider Russo-Ukrainian War, Babakov was subjected to sanctions, including an asset freeze, by the European Union.

He was sanctioned by the UK government in 2014 in relation to the Russo-Ukrainian War.

On 14 April 2022 the United States Department of Justice issued an indictment against Babakov for "conspiring to have US citizens act as an unregistered agent for Russia in the United States, conspiring to violate and evade US sanctions, and conspiring to commit visa fraud."

== Financial interests ==
According to anti-corruption investigations, including material published by Alexei Navalny, Babakov owns a heritage-listed estate in Saint-Léger-en-Yvelines, France and an apartment on Rue de l'Université in the wealthy 7th arrondissement of Paris.

He was also reported to own a residential flat in Richmond Court, Knightsbridge, London

In 2011 Babakov passed ownership of his British Virgin Islands registered holding company AED International to his daughter.

== Personal life ==
He is married and has three children.

== Awards and Titles ==
- Order "For Merit to the Fatherland," 4th class (November 23, 2020) — for significant contribution to strengthening Russian statehood, the development of parliamentarism, and many years of conscientious service
- Order of Honour (May 18, 2017) — for significant contribution to strengthening Russian statehood, the development of parliamentarism, and active legislative work
- Order of Friendship (May 21, 2008) — for achievements in legislative activity and in strengthening and developing Russian statehood
- Sretenje Order, 2nd class (2013, Serbia)
- Candidate of Economic Sciences
- Jubilee Medal "IPA CIS. 30 Years" (November 16, 2023, Interparliamentary Assembly of the CIS) — for contributions to the development and strengthening of parliamentarism, the improvement of the legal foundations of the Commonwealth of Independent States, and the promotion of international and interparliamentary cooperation
