= 2015 Russian elections =

← 2014	13 September 2015	2016 →
- Gubernatorial Gubernatorial of another subject Legislative Gubernatorial and legislative

The 2015 Russian elections were held in large part, on Sunday, 13 September 2015 (single election day). There were 24 gubernatorial elections (21 direct and three indirectly elected), 11 regional parliamentary elections, and many elections on the municipal level. Direct elections were held in all subjects, except Kabardino-Balkaria and North Ossetia.

Gubernatorial and legislative elections were scheduled during June 4–15, 2015. If regional governor resigned after this period an early gubernatorial election was scheduled for the next single election day in 2016.

== Regional elections ==
=== Gubernatorial direct elections ===
Region	Incumbent	Status	Last race	Results
Chuvashia	Mikhail Ignatyev (UR)	Re-elected	–	▌ ✓ Mikhail Ignatyev (inc.) (UR) 65.54%; ▌ Oleg Nikolayev (SR) 14.73%; ▌ Valentin Shurchanov (CPRF) 12.76%; ▌ Konstantin Subbotin (LDPR) 3.35%
Mari El	Leonid Markelov (UR)	Re-elected	2004: 56.86%	▌ ✓ Leonid Markelov (inc.) (UR) 50.78%; ▌ Sergey Mamayev (CPRF) 32.31%; ▌ Kirill Cherkasov (LDPR) 7.14%; ▌ Andrey Zabolotskikh (SR) 4.72%; ▌ Yury Kondakov (RPPS) 3.06%
Tatarstan	Rustam Minnikhanov (UR)	Re-elected	–	▌ ✓ Rustam Minnikhanov (inc.) (UR) 94.40%; ▌ Khafiz Mirgalimov (CPRF) 2.56%; ▌ Rushania Bilgildeyeva (SR) 1.68%; ▌ Ruslan Yusupov (LDPR) 0.81%
Kamchatka Krai	Vladimir Ilyukhin (UR)	Re-elected	–	▌ ✓ Vladimir Ilyukhin (inc.) (UR) 75.48%; ▌ Mikhail Smagin (CPRF) 9.96%; ▌ Valery Kalashnikov (LDPR) 8.14%; ▌ Aleksandr Ostrikov (PR) 3.49%
Krasnodar Krai	Alexander Tkachyov (UR)	Resigned	2004: 83.98%	▌ ✓ Veniamin Kondratyev (inc.) (UR) 83.64%; ▌ Nikolay Osadchy (CPRF) 7.88%; ▌ Andrey Rudenko (SR) 3.18%; ▌ Sergey Fisyuk (LDPR) 1.89%; ▌ Viktor Ponomaryov (PSZ) 1.66%
Krasnodar Krai	Veniamin Kondratyev (UR)	Acting Governor elected	–	▌ ✓ Veniamin Kondratyev (inc.) (UR) 83.64%; ▌ Nikolay Osadchy (CPRF) 7.88%; ▌ Andrey Rudenko (SR) 3.18%; ▌ Sergey Fisyuk (LDPR) 1.89%; ▌ Viktor Ponomaryov (PSZ) 1.66%
Amur Oblast	Oleg Kozhemyako (UR)	Resigned	2012: 77.28%	▌ ✓ Alexander Kozlov (inc.) (UR) 50.64%; ▌ Ivan Abramov (LDPR) 28.30%; ▌ Roman Kobyzov (CPRF) 14.87%; ▌ Mikhail Dragunov (CPSS) 3.63%
Amur Oblast	Alexander Kozlov (UR)	Acting Governor elected	–	▌ ✓ Alexander Kozlov (inc.) (UR) 50.64%; ▌ Ivan Abramov (LDPR) 28.30%; ▌ Roman Kobyzov (CPRF) 14.87%; ▌ Mikhail Dragunov (CPSS) 3.63%
Arkhangelsk Oblast	Igor Orlov (UR)	Re-elected	–	▌ ✓ Igor Orlov (inc.) (UR) 53.25%; ▌ Olga Ositsyna (LDPR) 19.22%; ▌ Vasily Pavlov (CPRF) 11.59%; ▌ Nadezhda Krayeva (SR) 10.92%; ▌ Vladimir Kertsev (CPCR) 2.83%
Bryansk Oblast	Nikolay Denin (UR)	Removed from office	2012: 65.22%	▌ ✓ Alexander Bogomaz (inc.) (UR) 79.96%; ▌ Mikhail Ivako (PR) 9.61%; ▌ Sergey Kurdenko (SR) 7.91%
Bryansk Oblast	Alexander Bogomaz (UR)	Acting Governor elected	–	▌ ✓ Alexander Bogomaz (inc.) (UR) 79.96%; ▌ Mikhail Ivako (PR) 9.61%; ▌ Sergey Kurdenko (SR) 7.91%
Irkutsk Oblast	Sergey Yeroshchenko (UR)	Lost re-election	–	First round: ▌ Sergey Yeroshchenko (inc.) (UR) 49.60%; ▌ Sergey Levchenko (CPRF) 36.61%; ▌ Larisa Yegorova (SR) 6.76%; ▌ Oleg Kuznetsov (LDPR) 4.15%; Second round: ▌ ✓ Sergey Levchenko (CPRF) 56.39%; ▌ Sergey Yeroshchenko (inc.) (UR) 41.46%
Kaliningrad Oblast	Nikolay Tsukanov (UR)	Re-elected	–	▌ ✓ Nikolay Tsukanov (inc.) (UR) 70.41%; ▌ Igor Revin (CPRF) 10.22%; ▌ Alexander Starovoitov (LDPR) 7.85%; ▌ Pavel Fyodorov (SR) 6.87%; ▌ Vladimir Vukolov (RPPS) 2.31%
Kaluga Oblast	Anatoly Artamonov (UR)	Re-elected	2004: 66.86%	▌ ✓ Anatoly Artamonov (inc.) (UR) 71.43%; ▌ Nikolay Yashkin (CPRF) 12.16%; ▌ Vadim Dengin (LDPR) 8.63%; ▌ Yevgeny Nevezhin (PR) 3.76%
Kemerovo Oblast	Aman Tuleyev (UR)	Re-elected	2001: 93.54%	▌ ✓ Aman Tuleyev (inc.) (UR) 96.69%; ▌ Alexei Didenko (LDPR) 1.78%; ▌ Viktor Shalamanov (CPRF) 0.52%; ▌ Vladimir Volchek (SR) 0.37%; ▌ Yury Skvortsov (PR) 0.31%
Kostroma Oblast	Sergey Sitnikov (UR)	Re-elected	–	▌ ✓ Sergey Sitnikov (inc.) (UR) 65.62%; ▌ Valery Izhitsky (CPRF) 21.43%; ▌ Sergey Petukhov (SR) 4.71%; ▌ Yury Kudryavtsev (LDPR) 4.36%; ▌ Georgy Tashchiyev (GR) 0.80%; ▌ Aleksandr Tarabrin (KaPRF) 0.51%
Leningrad Oblast	Aleksandr Drozdenko (UR)	Re-elected	–	▌ ✓ Aleksandr Drozdenko (inc.) (UR) 82.10%; ▌ Nikolay Kuzmin (CPRF) 6.98%; ▌ Andrey Lebedev (LDPR) 4.17%; ▌ Aleksandr Perminov (SR) 3.02%; ▌ Aleksandr Gabitov (GP) 1.97%
Omsk Oblast	Viktor Nazarov (UR)	Re-elected	–	▌ ✓ Viktor Nazarov (inc.) (UR) 59.99%; ▌ Oleg Denisenko (CPRF) 28.15%; ▌ Yan Zelinsky (LDPR) 3.67%; ▌ Andrey Dvoretsky (Rodina) 3.62%; ▌ Aleksandr Podzorov (CPCR) 2.32%
Penza Oblast	Vasily Bochkaryov (UR)	Not re-appointed	2002: 45.45%	▌ ✓ Ivan Belozertsev (inc.) (UR) 86.04%; ▌ Vladimir Simagin (CPRF) 7.75%; ▌ Zhigansha Tuktarov (LDPR) 2.86%; ▌ Gennady Yeroshin (SR) 1.35%; ▌ Vladimir Popkov (Rodina) 0.97%
Penza Oblast	Ivan Belozertsev (UR)	Acting Governor elected	–	▌ ✓ Ivan Belozertsev (inc.) (UR) 86.04%; ▌ Vladimir Simagin (CPRF) 7.75%; ▌ Zhigansha Tuktarov (LDPR) 2.86%; ▌ Gennady Yeroshin (SR) 1.35%; ▌ Vladimir Popkov (Rodina) 0.97%
Rostov Oblast	Vasily Golubev (UR)	Re-elected	–	▌ ✓ Vasily Golubev (inc.) (UR) 78.21%; ▌ Nikolay Kolomeitsev (CPRF) 11.66%; ▌ Mikhail Yemelyanov (SR) 5.03%; ▌ Ivan Novikov (LDPR) 2.37%; ▌ Ivan Kolesnikov (PPR) 1.26%
Sakhalin Oblast	Aleksandr Khoroshavin (UR)	Removed from office	–	▌ ✓ Oleg Kozhemyako (inc.) (UR) 67.80%; ▌ Svetlana Ivanova (CPRF) 20.27%; ▌ Eduard Taran (SR) 4.48%; ▌ Sergey Nechunayev (LDPR) 2.61%; ▌ Vladimir Goppe (Yabloko) 1.86%
Sakhalin Oblast	Oleg Kozhemyako (UR)	Acting Governor elected	–	▌ ✓ Oleg Kozhemyako (inc.) (UR) 67.80%; ▌ Svetlana Ivanova (CPRF) 20.27%; ▌ Eduard Taran (SR) 4.48%; ▌ Sergey Nechunayev (LDPR) 2.61%; ▌ Vladimir Goppe (Yabloko) 1.86%
Smolensk Oblast	Alexey Ostrovsky (LDPR)	Re-elected	–	▌ ✓ Alexey Ostrovsky (inc.) (LDPR) 65.18%; ▌ Sergey Lebedev (SR) 12.42%; ▌ Nikolay Kuznetsov (CPRF) 11.62%; ▌ Yelena Lobanova (GP) 5.45%; ▌ Vladimir Zaytsev (PARZAS) 2.03%
Tambov Oblast	Oleg Betin (UR)	Resigned	2003: 71.08%	▌ ✓ Aleksandr Nikitin (inc.) (UR) 85.47%; ▌ Andrey Zhidkov (CPRF) 6.89%; ▌ Roman Khudyakov (LDPR) 4.16%; ▌ Anatoly Safonov (SR) 1.27%; ▌ Aleksandr Kupriyanov (PR) 1.10%
Tambov Oblast	Aleksandr Nikitin (UR)	Acting Governor elected	–	▌ ✓ Aleksandr Nikitin (inc.) (UR) 85.47%; ▌ Andrey Zhidkov (CPRF) 6.89%; ▌ Roman Khudyakov (LDPR) 4.16%; ▌ Anatoly Safonov (SR) 1.27%; ▌ Aleksandr Kupriyanov (PR) 1.10%
Jewish Autonomous Oblast	Alexander Vinnikov (UR)	Not re-appointed	–	▌ ✓ Alexander Levintal (inc.) (UR) 74.42%; ▌ Konstantin Lazarev (CPRF) 15.37%; ▌ Pavel Malyshev (LDPR) 3.90%; ▌ Vladimir Dudin (SR) 2.14%; ▌ Tatyana Odyry (PPR) 1.63%
Jewish Autonomous Oblast	Alexander Levintal (UR)	Acting Governor elected	–	▌ ✓ Alexander Levintal (inc.) (UR) 74.42%; ▌ Konstantin Lazarev (CPRF) 15.37%; ▌ Pavel Malyshev (LDPR) 3.90%; ▌ Vladimir Dudin (SR) 2.14%; ▌ Tatyana Odyry (PPR) 1.63%

=== Gubernatorial indirect elections ===
Initially direct elections of Head of the Republic of North Ossetia–Alania were scheduled for September 2015, however, in November 2013 Parliament of the Republic of North Ossetia–Alania amended the electoral code abolishing direct head elections. According to the new law, political parties, represented in the republican Parliament or State Duma, propose their candidates to the President of Russia, the President then selects three candidates among the proposed and sends them to the Parliament of North Ossetia. The Parliament elects one of the nominated candidate as head of the republic by a simple majority.

Direct gubernatorial elections in 2015 were also slated to be held in the Khanty-Mansi Autonomous Okrug and Yamalo-Nenets Autonomous Okrug, which are simultaneously administrative subordinate to Tyumen Oblast, though, a November 2014 federal law permitted only indirect gubernatorial elections in Russian regions that constitute another federal subject. Under the new procedure Governor of Tyumen Oblast proposes five candidates for each autonomous okrug to the President of Russia, who selects three among them and sends for election by okra legislative assemblies.

Region	Incumbent	Status	Last race	Result
North Ossetia	Taymuraz Mamsurov (UR)	Not re-appointed	2010: 61/66	–
North Ossetia	Tamerlan Aguzarov (UR)	Acting Head elected	–	Tamerlan Aguzarov 66 / 68
Khanty-Mansi Autonomous Okrug	Natalya Komarova (UR)	Re-elected	2010: 28/28	Natalya Komarova 28 / 35
Yamalo-Nenets Autonomous Okrug	Dmitry Kobylkin (UR)	Re-elected	2010: 22/22	Dmitry Kobylkin 21 / 22

=== Legislative elections ===
Legislature	Seats	Voting system	Majority in last election		Majority after election	
State Council of the Komi Republic	30	Parallel (15 party list + 15 SMC)	United Russia	25 / 30	United Russia	26 / 30
Belgorod Oblast Duma	50	Parallel (25 party list + 25 SMC)	United Russia	29 / 35	United Russia	42 / 50
Legislative Assembly of Chelyabinsk Oblast	60	Parallel (30 party list + 30 SMC)	United Russia	49 / 60	United Russia	47 / 60
Legislative Assembly of Kaluga Oblast	40	Parallel (20 party list + 20 SMC)	United Russia	22 / 40	United Russia	31 / 40
Kostroma Oblast Duma	36	Parallel (18 party list + 18 SMC)	United Russia	26 / 36	United Russia	28 / 36
Kurgan Oblast Duma	34	Parallel (17 party list + 17 SMC)	United Russia	22 / 34	United Russia	28 / 34
Magadan Oblast Duma	21	Parallel (11 party list + 10 SMC)	United Russia	17 / 21	United Russia	17 / 21
Legislative Assembly of Novosibirsk Oblast	76	Parallel (38 party list + 38 SMC)	United Russia	48 / 76	United Russia	51 / 76
Ryazan Oblast Duma	36	Parallel (18 party list + 18 SMC)	United Russia	25 / 36	United Russia	32 / 36
Voronezh Oblast Duma	56	Parallel (28 party list + 28 SMC)	United Russia	48 / 56	United Russia	51 / 56
Legislative Assembly of Yamalo-Nenets Autonomous Okrug	22	Parallel (11 party list + 11 SMC)	United Russia	17 / 22	United Russia	18 / 22

=== Legislative by-elections ===
Territories that are internationally recognised as part of Ukraine are highlighted with beige.

Constituency		Incumbent		This Race	
Legislature	No	Former member	Party	Results	Candidates
Legislative Assembly of Kirov Oblast	19	Sergey Luzyanin	United Russia	Incumbent expelled June 26, 2014, after being indicted for tax fraud New member elected March 22, 2015; United Russia hold	▌ ✓ Irina Morozova (UR) 53.63%; ▌ Valery Arkhipov (CPRF) 25.48%; ▌ Timur Gusev (LDPR) 18.28%
Duma of Astrakhan Oblast	8	Vasily Sukhorukov	United Russia	Incumbent resigned September 14, 2014, to become Head of Kamyzyaksky District; New member elected September 13, 2015; United Russia hold	▌ ✓ Mikhail Derbasov (UR) 66.61%; ▌ Khamza Ismukhanov (SR) 18.39%; ▌ Pavel Medvedev (CPRF) 8.95%; ▌ Andrey Grebenshchikov (LDPR) 2.07%
State Council of Crimea	9	Sergey Pisarev	United Russia	Incumbent resigned September 29, 2014, to become acting Mayor of Kerch; New member elected September 13, 2015; United Russia hold	▌ ✓ Vladimir Podlipentsev (UR) 55.25%; ▌ Marina Milyutina (CPRF) 14.44%; ▌ Vladimir Malitsky (SR) 10.93%; ▌ Valery Alekseyev (CPCR) 9.86%; ▌ Gennady Petrenko (LDPR) 6.59%
State Assembly of the Altai Republic	19	Tatyana Gigel	United Russia	Incumbent resigned September 30, 2014, to become Member of the Federation Council; New member elected September 13, 2015; United Russia hold	▌ ✓ Svetlana Popova (UR) 54.20%; ▌ Yevgeny Shtanov (PARZAS) 28.34%; ▌ Aleksey Almadakov (Independent) 12.02%; ▌ Dmitry Dumnov (Yabloko) 1.26%; ▌ Dmitry Sofronov (LDPR) 0.96%; ▌ Denis Safiyanov (Independent) 0.35%
Bryansk Oblast Duma	9	Yakov Takvarov (Note: Never officially seated)	United Russia	Election results were annulled on September 30, 2014, after it was discovered that member-elect lacked Russian citizenship New member elected September 13, 2015; United Russia hold	▌ ✓ Georgy Abushenko (UR) 72.67%; ▌ Aleksandr Kupriyanov (CPRF) 14.37%; ▌ Andrey Mikhaylov (Independent) 5.08%
People's Khural of the Republic of Buryatia	5	Innokenty Yegorov	United Russia	Incumbent resigned October 1, 2014; New member elected September 13, 2015; Independent gain	▌ ✓ Sergey Tsydypov (Independent) 43.73%; ▌ Naydan Chimbeyev (UR) 38.72%; ▌ Boris Tsyrenov (CPRF) 11.44%; ▌ Yury Nikitin (GP) 3.20%
Pskov Oblast Assembly of Deputies	15	Yelena Bibikova	United Russia	Incumbent resigned October 2, 2014, to become Member of the Federation Council; New member elected September 13, 2015; United Russia hold	▌ ✓ Igor Dietrich (UR) 60.59%; ▌ Dmitry Bogdanov (CPRF) 16.45%; ▌ Andrey Garusov (Independent) 10.95%; ▌ Igor Ivanov (LDPR) 9.61%
Moscow Oblast Duma	2	Sergey Koshman	United Russia	Member-elect declined to take seat on October 3, 2014; New member elected September 13, 2015; United Russia hold	▌ ✓ Marina Shevchenko (UR) 64.68%; ▌ Aleksandr Kornev (CPRF) 14.15%; ▌ Vyacheslav Belousov (SR) 9.26%; ▌ Ilya Rodkin (LDPR) 4.09%; ▌ Dmitry Trunin (Yabloko) 3.06%; ▌ Oleg Solsky (AGSD) 2.49%
State Council of Crimea	19	Vitaly Polishchuk	United Russia	Incumbent resigned October 15, 2014, to become Minister of Agriculture of Crimea; New member elected September 13, 2015; United Russia hold	▌ ✓ Igor Polishchuk (UR) 49.10%; ▌ Ildar Rezyapov (PVR) 21.93%; ▌ Igor Kiyko (LDPR) 9.02%; ▌ Mikhail Semayev (CPRF) 7.71%; ▌ Aleksandr Yuryev (SR) 5.40%; ▌ Tair Abduvaliyev (CPCR) 4.01%
Legislative Assembly of Krasnodar Krai	39	Sergey Zirinov	United Russia	Incumbent expelled October 23, 2014, after being charged with attempted murder and racketeering New member elected September 13, 2015; United Russia hold	▌ ✓ Fyodor Yanishoglo (UR) 74.55%; ▌ Viktor Tyurin (CPRF) 10.42%; ▌ Vladimir Yenin (SR) 6.37%; ▌ Kristina Papoyan (LDPR) 6.30%
Duma of Astrakhan Oblast	4	Aleksey Galkin	United Russia	Incumbent resigned October 23, 2014, to become Minister of Agriculture and Fisheries of Astrakhan Oblast; New member elected September 13, 2015; United Russia hold	▌ ✓ Aleksandr Khodayev (UR) 72.46%; ▌ Mikhail Manoshkin (CPRF) 11.29%; ▌ Andrey Stukalov (LDPR) 6.67%; ▌ Yelena Tulupova (SR) 3.60%; ▌ Farkhad Dzhanaliyev (Yabloko) 3.08%
State Assembly of the Altai Republic	14	Vladimir Chelchushev	United Russia	Incumbent resigned November 18, 2014, to become Chairman of the Altai Republic Committee on Youth Policy, Physical Culture and Sports; New member elected September 13, 2015; A Just Russia gain	▌ ✓ Aydar Tazrashev (SR) 54.73%; ▌ Ivan Kuyukov (UR) 39.08%; ▌ Oleg Tolpygo (Independent) 2.78%; ▌ Yury Sakhilyanov (LDPR) 1.14%
Legislative Assembly of Kirov Oblast	11	Mikhail Likhachev	United Russia	Incumbent died January 11, 2015; New member elected September 13, 2015; United Russia hold	▌ ✓ Andrey Luchinin (UR) 46.52%; ▌ Aleksey Maltsev (SR) 26.73%; ▌ Lyudmila Sharayeva (LDPR) 13.81%; ▌ Aleksandr Boyarintsev (CPRF) 9.19%; ▌ Yevgeny Mezentsev (Independent) 1.85%
State Council of the Udmurt Republic	17	Aleksey Alekseyev	Independent	Incumbent resigned January 13, 2015; New member elected September 13, 2015; United Russia gain	▌ ✓ Aleksey Chulkin (UR) 52.44%; ▌ Elgiz Gadzhiyev (CPRF) 17.86%; ▌ Anton Babin (LDPR) 10.90%; ▌ Anatoly Lomayev (Yabloko) 7.50%; ▌ Mikhail Zagumyonov (SR) 5.59%
State Council of the Udmurt Republic	4	Pavel Titov	United Russia	Incumbent committed suicide February 11, 2015; New member elected September 13, 2015; United Russia hold	▌ ✓ Oleg Karavayev (UR) 52.02%; ▌ Valentin Svyatenko (CPRF) 19.20%; ▌ Anton Gusev (LDPR) 11.88%; ▌ Aleksey Shabala (SR) 8.11%
Tyumen Oblast Duma	3	Sergey Bilkey	United Russia	Incumbent resigned February 12, 2015; New member elected September 13, 2015; United Russia hold	▌ ✓ Nikolay Yashkin (UR) 55.61%; ▌ Aleksandr Chepik (CPRF) 11.18%; ▌ Yevgeny Kalinichenko (LDPR) 10.14%; ▌ Aleksandr Varaksin (SR) 9.73%; ▌ Yana Kuznetsova (Independent) 9.49%
Legislative Duma of Tomsk Oblast	21	Aleksandr Kadesnikov	United Russia	Incumbent resigned March 12, 2015, to work for regional government New member elected September 13, 2015; United Russia hold	▌ ✓ Dmitry Nikulin (UR) 51.97%; ▌ Vasily Petrashov (LDPR) 40.19%
State Council of the Udmurt Republic	35	Sergey Anzhigur	United Russia	Incumbent resigned April 1, 2015; New member elected September 13, 2015; United Russia hold	▌ ✓ Yevgeny Maslennikov (UR) 69.18%; ▌ Aleksandr Kuznetsov (SR) 10.95%; ▌ Nikolay Mukhachyov (CPRF) 10.76%; ▌ Denis Veys (LDPR) 4.76%
People's Khural of the Republic of Buryatia	6	Leonid Blyakher	RPPS	Incumbent died April 15, 2015; New member elected September 13, 2015; United Russia gain	▌ ✓ Valery Tsyrempilov (UR) 60.63%; ▌ Albert Erdyniyev (Independent) 26.23%; ▌ Gennady Marmushev (Independent) 9.33%
Tambov Oblast Duma	15	Vladimir Toporkov	United Russia	Incumbent expelled April 22, 2015, after being indicted for drunk driving and causing a deadly accident New member elected September 13, 2015; United Russia hold	▌ ✓ Vasily Klyuchenok (UR) 84.61%; ▌ Andrey Mishukov (LDPR) 10.02%; ▌ Roman Kharin (Independent) 4.59%
People's Khural of the Republic of Buryatia	31	Khankhay Mongolov	United Russia	Incumbent expelled April 23, 2015, after being indicted for embezzlement New member elected September 13, 2015; United Russia hold	▌ ✓ Aleksandr Lonshakov (UR) 54.01%; ▌ Bator Budayev (Independent) 43.10%
Pskov Oblast Assembly of Deputies	7	Arkady Murylyov	CPRF	Incumbent resigned April 28, 2015, to become Commissioner for Entrepreneurs’ Rights of Pskov Oblast; New member elected September 13, 2015; United Russia gain	▌ ✓ Vsevolod Kozlovsky (UR) 59.97%; ▌ Nikolay Chuvaylov (CPRF) 16.82%; ▌ Artyom Medvedev (Yabloko) 9.37%; ▌ Vladimir Tishevsky (PR) 6.95%; ▌ Yury Pavlinov (LDPR) 4.31%
State Assembly of the Republic of Bashkortostan	50	Konstantin Chistyakov	United Russia	Incumbent resigned May 13, 2015; New member elected September 13, 2015; United Russia hold	▌ ✓ Ramil Bignov (UR) 66.57%; ▌ Yury Biryuzov (CPRF) 9.96%; ▌ Zagit Shafikov (LDPR) 7.49%; ▌ Almas Nuretdinov (PR) 6.11%; ▌ Yegor Nikolayev (SR) 4.77%; ▌ Irshat Minullin (RPPS) 2.91%; ▌ Murad Shafikov (Greens) 1.92%
Tambov Oblast Duma	7	Aleksandr Nikitin	United Russia	Incumbent resigned May 25, 2015, to become acting Head of Administration of Tambov Oblast; New member elected September 13, 2015; United Russia hold	▌ ✓ Aleksandr Sukharev (UR) 67.99%; ▌ Nikolay Zakharov (CPRF) 14.80%; ▌ Irina Misanova (Independent) 7.18%; ▌ Andrey Karavayev (LDPR) 4.93%
Volgograd Oblast Duma	5	Angar Politsimako	United Russia	Incumbent resigned May 26, 2015, after being charged with misappropriation of funds New member elected September 13, 2015; United Russia hold	▌ ✓ Eduard Davydovsky (UR) 52.98%; ▌ Dmitry Krylov (CPRF) 22.44%; ▌ Viktor Krylov (RPPS) 12.53%; ▌ Vitaly Shelmenkov (LDPR) 4.84%; ▌ Aleksey Zibarev (SR) 3.38%
Legislative Assembly of Kirov Oblast	1	Dmitry Osipov	United Russia	Incumbent resigned May 28, 2015; New member elected September 13, 2015; United Russia hold	▌ ✓ Rakhim Azimov (UR) 65.53%; ▌ Dmitry Butorin (LDPR) 14.75%; ▌ Aleksey Votintsev (CPRF) 12.52%; ▌ Andrey Perov (Independent) 4.50%
State Assembly of the Republic of Bashkortostan	15	Andrey Makarov	United Russia	Incumbent resigned June 9, 2015; New member elected September 13, 2015; United Russia hold	▌ ✓ Khaydar Gaysin (UR) 72.29%; ▌ Nikolay Gladilov (CPRF) 13.92%; ▌ Artyom Dyachenko (LDPR) 6.60%; ▌ Maksim Varlamov (PR) 6.14%
Legislative Duma of Khabarovsk Krai	9	Viktor Lemekha	United Russia	Incumbent resigned June 9, 2015, to become Minister of Industry and Transport of Khabarovsk Krai; New member elected September 13, 2015; United Russia hold	▌ ✓ Sergey Sokurenko (UR) 44.04%; ▌ Stanislav Slivko (CPRF) 25.58%; ▌ Igor Glukhov (SR) 13.25%; ▌ Aleksandr Nikulin (Yabloko) 6.11%; ▌ Ivan Pilyayev (LDPR) 5.23%; ▌ Pyotr Kuznetsov (Rodina) 2.78%
Legislative Assembly of Vladimir Oblast	12	Sergey Kuryshev	United Russia	Incumbent expelled August 17, 2015, after being indicted for drunk driving and causing a deadly accident New member elected December 20, 2015; United Russia hold	▌ ✓ Svetlana Mangusheva (UR) 54.01%; ▌ Timur Markov (SR) 26.40%; ▌ Vladimir Khromov (CPRF) 11.58%; ▌ Yegor Fedorov (LDPR) 6.42%

== Municipal elections ==
=== Mayoral elections ===
City	Incumbent	Date	Status	Last race	Results
Ob (Novosibirsk Oblast)	Ilya Sivoyedov (IND) acting mayor	Feb 8, 2015	Retiring	–	▌ ✓ Aleksandr Mozzherin (UR) 40.44%; ▌ Aleksandr Petrov (LDPR) 32.15%; ▌ Igor Popov (CPRF) 7.69%; ▌ Pavel Bukovinin (Independent) 4.89%; ▌ Sergey Nacharov (Rodina) 4.48%; ▌ Vladimir Shkurko (Independent) 3.71%; ▌ Vyacheslav Lepikhin (Independent) 1.74%; ▌ Yelena Kozhevnikova (GR) 0.82%; ▌ Anton Salnik (PARZAS) 0.74%; ▌ Roman Bykov (PVR) 0.43%
Kedrovy (Tomsk Oblast)	Yevgeny Bren (IND) acting mayor	Mar 1, 2015	Lost election for a full term	–	▌ ✓ Nelli Solovyeva (UR) 77.55%; ▌ Yevgeny Bren (inc.) (Independent) 8.55%; ▌ Ivan Yavtishev (Independent) 4.28%; ▌ Velibeg Velibekov (Independent) 3.95%; ▌ Dzhavanshir Veliyev (Independent) 3.70%
Karpinsk (Sverdlovsk Oblast)	Viktor Vekker (IND) acting mayor	Apr 4, 2015	Retiring	–	▌ ✓ Andrey Klopov (UR) 81.21%; ▌ Valery Tarakin (LDPR) 9.01%; ▌ Irina Artamonova (RPPS) 3.23%; ▌ Leonid Duma (SR) 2.94%; ▌ Galina Yeremina (NPZZhR) 0.79%; ▌ Denis Sosnovskikh (Independent) 0.68%
Angarsk (Irkutsk Oblast)	Sergey Borisov (IND) acting mayor	Apr 26, 2015	Retiring	–	▌ ✓ Sergey Petrov (UR) 70.53%; ▌ Sergey Brenyuk (CPRF) 11.34%; ▌ Dmitry Nadymov (PR) 4.51%; ▌ Dmitry Tyutrin (LDPR) 3.61%; ▌ Olga Zhakova (SR) 2.94%; ▌ Leonid Karnaukhov (RPPS) 1.94%; ▌ Nikita Balakin (Yabloko) 1.10%
Tayga (Kemerovo Oblast)	Nikolay Glukhikh (UR) acting mayor	June 7, 2015	Lost election for a full term	–	▌ ✓ Aleksandr Mayer (Independent) 60.74%; ▌ Nikolay Glukhikh (inc.) (UR) 24.50%; ▌ Yevgeny Koshkarev (Independent) 5.54%; ▌ Sergey Volkov (LDPR) 4.12%
Chernogorsk (Khakassia)	Vasily Belonogov (UR)	Sep 13, 2015	Re-elected	64.67%	▌ ✓ Vasily Belonogov (inc.) (UR) 58.82%; ▌ Sergey Serik (Independent) 22.01%; ▌ Oleg Ivanov (Independent) 9.20%; ▌ Ksenia Lukhman (Independent) 4.30%; ▌ Dmitry Bureyev (LDPR) 4.12%
Cheremkhovo (Irkutsk Oblast)	Vadim Semenov (UR)	Sep 13, 2015	Re-elected	91.60%	▌ ✓ Vadim Semenov (inc.) (UR) 91.47%; ▌ Sergey Tuzhilkin (PR) 4.34%; ▌ Yevgeny Shcheglov (Independent) 2.04%
Svirsk (Irkutsk Oblast)	Vladimir Ornoyev (UR)	Sep 13, 2015	Re-elected	85.98%	▌ ✓ Vladimir Ornoyev (inc.) (UR) 85.71%; ▌ Aleksandr Svetlakov (CPRF) 6.89%; ▌ Yury Blazhevich (Independent) 4.19%
Ust-Ilimsk (Irkutsk Oblast)	Lyudmila Bazhanova (UR) acting mayor	Sep 13, 2015	Retiring	–	▌ ✓ Vakil Tulubayev (UR) 44.03%; ▌ Sergey Zatsepin (Independent) 33.12%; ▌ Aleksandr Khvorostinin (Independent) 10.63%; ▌ Yevgeny Matveyev (CPRF) 3.44%; ▌ Aleksandr Yeliseyev (PR) 2.67%; ▌ Aleksandr Sitnikov (SR) 2.21%; ▌ Maria Belezova (Smart Russia) 0.78%
Zima (Irkutsk Oblast)	Vladimir Trubnikov (UR)	Sep 13, 2015	Re-elected	42.65%	▌ ✓ Vladimir Trubnikov (inc.) (UR) 89.31%; ▌ Viktor Matyushin (Smart Russia) 6.60%
Leninsk-Kuznetsky (Kemerovo Oblast)	Vyacheslav Telegin (UR)	Sep 13, 2015	Re-elected	85.20%	▌ ✓ Vyacheslav Telegin (inc.) (UR) 92.66%; ▌ Aleksandr Alutin (Independent) 4.48%; ▌ Svetlana Khusnutdinova (LDPR) 2.77%
Mezhdurechensk (Kemerovo Oblast)	Sergey Kislitsin (UR) acting mayor	Sep 13, 2015	Elected for a full term	–	▌ ✓ Sergey Kislitsin (inc.) (UR) 79.82%; ▌ Vladimir Kotov (Yabloko) 8.10%; ▌ Aleksandr Vasenin (Independent) 6.64%; ▌ Aleksey Koptev (PVO) 4.15%
Buy (Kostroma Oblast)	Valery Katyshev (UR)	Sep 13, 2015	Re-elected	55.60%	▌ ✓ Valery Katyshev (inc.) (UR) 51.97%; ▌ Olga Drobysheva (CPRF) 37.14%; ▌ Vladimir Davydenko (LDPR) 7.72%
Galich (Kostroma Oblast)	Aleksey Belov (UR)	Sep 13, 2015	Retiring	57.86%	▌ ✓ Sergey Sinitsky (UR) 65.63%; ▌ Valery Bobrov (Independent) 20.73%; ▌ Vladimir Nikanorov (LDPR) 7.25%; ▌ Vladimir Timoshchuk (Independent) 2.64%; ▌ Andrey Sakharov (Independent) 1.54%
Sharya (Kostroma Oblast)	Vladimir Klimov (UR)	Sep 13, 2015	Retiring	44.73%	▌ ✓ Ivan Tsaritsyn (UR) 45.14%; ▌ Svetlana Shurygina (PB) 36.49%; ▌ Pavel Rumyantsev (Independent) 13.30%
Volgorechensk (Kostroma Oblast)	Yury Makov (IND)	Sep 13, 2015	Retiring	61.84%	▌ ✓ Vladimir Baldin (Independent) 56.47%; ▌ Vladimir Nagatsky (UR) 34.98%; ▌ Stanislav Prorokov (LDPR) 4.15%
Domodedovo (Moscow Oblast)	Leonid Kovalevsky (UR)	Sep 13, 2015	Re-elected	54.97%	▌ ✓ Leonid Kovalevsky (inc.) (UR) 67.87%; ▌ Aleksandr Rogov (LDPR) 8.59%; ▌ Aleksey Belyayev (SR) 4.86%; ▌ Anna Danilova (AGSD) 4.79%; ▌ Olga Oncheva (PD) 4.71%; ▌ Yevgenia Petukhova (Dignity) 3.40%; ▌ Vitaly Atayev-Troshin (GR) 3.09%
Murom (Vladimir Oblast)	Yevgeny Rychkov (UR)	Sep 13, 2015	Re-elected	51.37%	▌ ✓ Yevgeny Rychkov (inc.) (UR) 86.04%; ▌ Aleksey Motyakov (CPRF) 4.55%; ▌ Aleksey Palchikov (LDPR) 3.08%; ▌ Ivan Belov (Independent) 1.94%; ▌ Yury Tebenikhin (SR) 1.55%

=== District elections ===
District	Incumbent	Date	Status	Last race	Results
Nerchinsko-Zavodsky District (Zabaykalsky Krai)	Sergey Kondakov (IND) acting mayor	Mar 1, 2015	Retiring	–	▌ ✓ Andrey Sarafannikov (Independent) 57.61%; ▌ Viktor Lopatin (UR) 33.11%; ▌ Yury Kostrov (SR) 6.50%
Amginsky District (Sakha Republic)	Vasily Illarionov (IND) acting mayor	Mar 15, 2015	Retiring	–	▌ ✓ Nikolay Arkhipov (Independent) 63.74%; ▌ Mikhail Artemyev (UR) 34.76%; ▌ Vladimir Andreyev (Independent) 0.68%
Khangalassky District (Sakha Republic)	Vasily Afanasyev (IND) acting mayor	Mar 15, 2015	Retiring	–	▌ ✓ Gavril Alekseyev (UR) 84.62%; ▌ Georgy Yemelyanov (Independent) 11.44%; ▌ Vladimir Vasilyev (Independent) 2.09%
Suntarsky District (Sakha Republic)	Andrey Nikitin (IND) acting mayor	Mar 15, 2015	Retiring	–	▌ ✓ Anatoly Grigoryev (UR) 82.70%; ▌ Ivan Nikolayev (Independent) 8.11%; ▌ Aleksandr Gulyayev (Independent) 6.52%
Tyazhinsky District (Kemerovo Oblast)	Sergey Koshkin (UR) acting mayor	Mar 15, 2015	Elected for a full term	–	▌ ✓ Sergey Koshkin (inc.) (UR) 83.84%; ▌ Aleksey Yevteyev (LDPR) 7.56%; ▌ Nikolay Pogorelko (Independent) 6.41%
Kochenyovsky District (Novosibirsk Oblast)	Andrey Novotorzhentsev (UR) acting mayor	Mar 15, 2015	Elected for a full term	–	▌ ✓ Andrey Novotorzhentsev (inc.) (UR) 75.43%; ▌ Sergey Chubarov (CPRF) 18.03%; ▌ Yaroslav Sergiyenko (LDPR) 2.16%; ▌ Aleksandr Kondratyev (SR) 1.73%
Leninsky District (Moscow Oblast)	Oleg Khromov (IND) acting mayor	Apr 26, 2015	Elected for a full term	–	▌ ✓ Oleg Khromov (inc.) (Independent) 65.39%; ▌ Andrey Khromov (LDPR) 15.49%; ▌ Larisa Sablina (Independent) 9.02%; ▌ Pyotr Lozhkovoy (PD) 3.66%; ▌ Feliks Zhamaliyev (Rodina) 2.03%
Pyshchugsky District (Kostroma Oblast)	Valentina Shorokhova (IND) acting mayor	June 7, 2015	Retiring	–	▌ ✓ Volislav Serdyuk (UR) 59.53%; ▌ Lyubov Parfeny (Independent) 19.20%; ▌ Maksim Garin (Independent) 7.16%; ▌ Oleg Ignashov (LDPR) 2.81%; ▌ Sergey Barbanov (Independent) 2.74%
Mogoytuysky District (Zabaykalsky Krai)	Bulat Nimbuyev (UR) acting mayor	Sep 13, 2015	Elected for a full term	–	▌ ✓ Bulat Nimbuyev (inc.) (UR) 64.84%; ▌ Tsyrendorzhi Damdinov (SR) 24.25%; ▌ Balzhinima Batomunkuyev (CPRF) 7.02%
Nerchinsky District (Zabaykalsky Krai)	Viktor Shestakov (IND) acting mayor	Sep 13, 2015	Retiring	–	▌ ✓ Roman Senotrusov (Independent) 41.53%; ▌ Valery Gladyshev (UR) 21.11%; ▌ Sergey Sverkunov (CPRF) 20.03%; ▌ Viktor Yepifantsev (Independent) 8.03%; ▌ Nikolay Didenko (Independent) 4.05%; ▌ Pavel Kurilenko (Independent) 2.16%
Volodarsky District (Astrakhan Oblast)	Batyrshin Mindiyev (UR)	Sep 13, 2015	Re-elected	68.71%	▌ ✓ Batyrshin Mindiyev (inc.) (UR) 80.31%; ▌ Sabir Murzaliyev (SR) 7.89%; ▌ Nikolay Lipilin (LDPR) 5.10%; ▌ Rustam Shakhmanov (Independent) 3.81%
Bratsky District (Irkutsk Oblast)	Aleksandr Starukhin (UR)	Sep 13, 2015	Lost re-election	38.51%	▌ ✓ Aleksey Balovnev (CPRF) 46.15%; ▌ Aleksandr Starukhin (inc.) (UR) 39.13%; ▌ Galina Shekhireva (Independent) 11.69%; ▌ Leonid Karnaukhov (RPPS) 3.90%; ▌ Vasily Muraykin (Smart Russia) 1.84%
Chunsky District (Irkutsk Oblast)	Valery Tyumentsev (UR)	Sep 13, 2015	Re-elected	36.73%	▌ ✓ Valery Tyumentsev (inc.) (UR) 25.45%; ▌ Yury Konovalov (Independent) 23.42%; ▌ Aleksandr Beglyakov (GP) 21.06%; ▌ Tatyana Belousova (CPRF) 18.87%; ▌ Yury Kankov (PNBR) 5.73%; ▌ Dmitry Pugatsevich (Smart Russia) 0.81%
Kachugsky District (Irkutsk Oblast)	Pavel Kozlov (UR)	Sep 13, 2015	Lost re-election	48.92%	▌ ✓ Tatyana Kirillova (Independent) 34.35%; ▌ Pavel Kozlov (inc.) (UR) 33.44%; ▌ Yury Meshkov (PR) 21.48%; ▌ Aleksey Zaytsev (LDPR) 5.12%; ▌ Sergey Alekseyev (Independent) 2.59%
Mamsko-Chuysky District (Irkutsk Oblast)	Aleksandr Sergey (UR)	Sep 13, 2015	Re-elected	49.54%	▌ ✓ Aleksandr Sergey (inc.) (UR) 40.64%; ▌ Valery Klets (SR) 20.96%; ▌ Irina Teymurova (Independent) 17.38%; ▌ Nikolay Turkov (Independent) 12.07%; ▌ Yevgeny Kurgansky (Independent) 4.75%
Nizhneilimsky District (Irkutsk Oblast)	Nikolay Tyukhtyayev (UR)	Sep 13, 2015	Retiring	42.99%	▌ ✓ Maksim Romanov (CPRF) 37.13%; ▌ Boris Alekseyev (UR) 34.50%; ▌ Oleg Kiyanitsa (LDPR) 17.60%; ▌ Nikolay Grishin (Independent) 6.76%
Nizhneudinsky District (Irkutsk Oblast)	Sergey Khudonogov (UR)	Sep 13, 2015	Re-elected	48.35%	▌ ✓ Sergey Khudonogov (inc.) (UR) 52.99%; ▌ Vladimir Bezborodov (CPRF) 25.81%; ▌ Maria Furman (Smart Russia) 8.34%
Ust-Kutsky District (Irkutsk Oblast)	Vladimir Senin (UR)	Sep 13, 2015	Retiring	45.41%	▌ ✓ Tamara Klimina (LDPR) 28.91%; ▌ Yury Kononov (UR) 28.11%; ▌ Maksim Sukhov (CPRF) 20.92%; ▌ Nikolay Teseyko (Independent) 11.66%; ▌ Aleksandr Vysokikh (Independent) 6.07%; ▌ Mikhail Dryagin (Smart Russia) 0.81%
Zalarinsky District (Irkutsk Oblast)	Vladimir Samoylovich (UR)	Sep 13, 2015	Re-elected	31.17%	▌ ✓ Vladimir Samoylovich (inc.) (UR) 79.14%; ▌ Yury Gazhalov (Independent) 10.41%; ▌ Boris Kripak (Independent) 6.14%
Ziminsky District (Irkutsk Oblast)	Natalya Nikitina (UR)	Sep 13, 2015	Re-elected	59.33%	▌ ✓ Natalya Nikitina (inc.) (UR) 52.54%; ▌ Aleksandr Krendelev (SR) 31.32%; ▌ Yevgeny Shubin (PR) 10.68%; ▌ Sergey Yakubov (LDPR) 1.55%; ▌ Vladimir Rusakov (Smart Russia) 1.11%
Guryevsky District (Kemerovo Oblast)	Sergey Malyshev (UR)	Sep 13, 2015	Re-elected	73.87%	▌ ✓ Sergey Malyshev (inc.) (UR) 79.38%; ▌ Valery Retivykh (Independent) 5.60%; ▌ Eduard Tyapikin (LDPR) 4.18%; ▌ Andrey Safonov (Independent) 2.93%
Kemerovsky District (Kemerovo Oblast)	Gleb Orlov (UR) acting mayor	Sep 13, 2015	Elected for a full term	–	▌ ✓ Gleb Orlov (inc.) (UR) 82.81%; ▌ Yulia Kuzmina (Independent) 7.55%; ▌ Sergey Lyakh (LDPR) 4.96%; ▌ Denis Shaykhutdinov (Independent) 3.97%
Krapivinsky District (Kemerovo Oblast)	Takhir Bikkulov (UR) acting mayor	Sep 13, 2015	Elected for a full term	–	▌ ✓ Takhir Bikkulov (inc.) (UR) 95.06%; ▌ Sergey Lyakh (LDPR) 2.59%; ▌ Natalya Titova (Independent) 2.01%
Leninsk-Kuznetsky District (Kemerovo Oblast)	Aleksey Kharitonov (UR)	Sep 13, 2015	Re-elected	86.98%	▌ ✓ Aleksey Kharitonov (inc.) (UR) 90.14%; ▌ Anatoly Titayev (LDPR) 7.16%
Mariinsky District (Kemerovo Oblast)	Aleksandr Krivtsov (UR) acting mayor	Sep 13, 2015	Elected for a full term	–	▌ ✓ Aleksandr Krivtsov (inc.) (UR) 87.94%; ▌ Sergey Filin (Independent) 5.57%; ▌ Konstantin Kodachegov (LDPR) 5.40%
Promyshlennovsky District (Kemerovo Oblast)	Denis Ilyin (UR) acting mayor	Sep 13, 2015	Elected for a full term	–	▌ ✓ Denis Ilyin (inc.) (UR) 93.51%; ▌ Dmitry Boyarsky (Independent) 3.10%; ▌ Roman Kleyster (LDPR) 2.06%
Antropovsky District (Kostroma Oblast)	Yevgeny Novikov (UR)	Sep 13, 2015	Re-elected	41.38%	▌ ✓ Yevgeny Novikov (inc.) (UR) 41.46%; ▌ Mikhail Ivanov (Independent) 28.98%; ▌ Roman Mochalov (Independent) 15.73%; ▌ Andrey Rumyantsev (Independent) 7.00%; ▌ Yury Kupranov (Independent) 4.70%
Buysky District (Kostroma Oblast)	Vyacheslav Yagodin (UR)	Sep 13, 2015	Retiring	59.21%	▌ ✓ Aleksandr Aleksandrov (UR) 49.91%; ▌ Nikolay Omelchenko (Independent) 32.19%; ▌ Vladimir Davydenko (LDPR) 9.32%; ▌ Vladimir Prituzhalov (Independent) 5.35%
Chukhlomsky District (Kostroma Oblast)	Andrey Znamensky (UR)	Sep 13, 2015	Retiring	62.18%	▌ ✓ Vladimir Bakhvalov (UR) 80.87%; ▌ Ilya Ivanovsky (Independent) 10.42%; ▌ Tamara Palekhova (Independent) 5.40%
Galichsky District (Kostroma Oblast)	Aleksandr Potekhin (UR)	Sep 13, 2015	Re-elected	55.12%	▌ ✓ Aleksandr Potekhin (inc.) (UR) 60.83%; ▌ Aleksandr Gulin (SR) 15.74%; ▌ Vladimir Yeryomkin (Independent) 14.20%; ▌ Dmitry Smirnov (LDPR) 6.49%
Kostromskoy District (Kostroma Oblast)	Sergey Chestnov (UR)	Sep 13, 2015	Retiring	55.12%	▌ ✓ Valery Noda (UR) 55.90%; ▌ Anna Vyazigina (LDPR) 19.83%; ▌ Igor Molkov (Independent) 19.23%
Ostrovsky District (Kostroma Oblast)	Galina Polyakova (UR)	Sep 13, 2015	Re-elected	44.58%	▌ ✓ Galina Polyakova (inc.) (UR) 50.65%; ▌ Nikolay Smirnov (CPRF) 34.09%; ▌ Yelena Smirnova (Independent) 12.67%
Ponazyrevsky District (Kostroma Oblast)	Yelena Borkova (IND)	Sep 13, 2015	Failed to qualify	53.91%	▌ ✓ Andrey Kuznetsov (UR) 60.76%; ▌ Aleksey Podshivalov (Independent) 30.38%; ▌ Yevgeny Khomov (Independent) 4.65%
Sharyinsky District (Kostroma Oblast)	Nikolay Glushakov (UR)	Sep 13, 2015	Re-elected	48.34%	▌ ✓ Nikolay Glushakov (inc.) (UR) 46.36%; ▌ Lidia Udalova (Independent) 43.05%; ▌ Nikolay Kuptsov (Independent) 6.56%
Susaninsky District (Kostroma Oblast)	Sergey Zhuravlev (UR)	Sep 13, 2015	Re-elected	71.57%	▌ ✓ Sergey Zhuravlev (inc.) (UR) 72.02%; ▌ Aleksandr Shulkov (Independent) 23.75%
Vokhomsky District (Kostroma Oblast)	Aleksandr Adeyev (UR)	Sep 13, 2015	Re-elected	81.00%	▌ ✓ Aleksandr Adeyev (inc.) (UR) 57.95%; ▌ Valentina Chigareva (Independent) 19.86%; ▌ Galina Lepikhova (Independent) 7.62%; ▌ Andrey Chicherin (Independent) 7.55%; ▌ Lyudmila Stepanova (Independent) 5.53%
Sebezhsky District (Pskov Oblast)	Leonid Kursenkov (UR)	Sep 13, 2015	Re-elected	55.58%	▌ ✓ Leonid Kursenkov (inc.) (UR) 67.62%; ▌ Aleksey Kharlashin (LDPR) 20.77%; ▌ Dmitry Lebedev (CPCR) 5.50%; ▌ Denis Shuvalov (Independent) 3.34%
Alexandrovsky District (Tomsk Oblast)	Aleksandr Zhdanov (UR)	Sep 13, 2015	Retiring	57.11%	▌ ✓ Igor Krylov (Independent) 38.01%; ▌ Aleksandr Fisenko (UR) 35.87%; ▌ Vasily Dubrovin (Independent) 15.32%; ▌ Pavel Yevtushenko (Independent) 7.77%
Bakcharsky District (Tomsk Oblast)	Dmitry Donskoy (UR)	Sep 13, 2015	Retiring	88.23%	▌ ✓ Sergey Revera (Independent) 67.20%; ▌ Andrey Maslovsky (UR) 29.78%; ▌ Pavel Nikolayev (Independent) 1.11%
Chainsky District (Tomsk Oblast)	Vladimir Stolyarov (UR)	Sep 13, 2015	Re-elected	51.01%	▌ ✓ Vladimir Lukyanov (inc.) (UR) 39.90%; ▌ Leonid Nurgaliyev (Independent) 27.33%; ▌ Viktor Orlov (Independent) 17.60%; ▌ Aleksey Barkov (Independent) 7.51%; ▌ Anatoly Gorkunov (Independent) 3.49%
Kozhevnikovsky District (Tomsk Oblast)	Aleksandr Yemelyanov (UR)	Sep 13, 2015	Re-elected	74.34%	▌ ✓ Aleksandr Yemelyanov (inc.) (UR) 60.28%; ▌ Yury Zhuravlev (Independent) 37.15%
Krivosheinsky District (Tomsk Oblast)	Aleksandr Razumnikov (UR)	Sep 13, 2015	Lost re-election	66.99%	▌ ✓ Sergey Taylashev (Independent) 47.78%; ▌ Aleksandr Razumnikov (inc.) (UR) 46.95%; ▌ Kamil Mustafin (Independent) 2.94%
Parabelsky District (Tomsk Oblast)	Aleksandr Karlov (UR)	Sep 13, 2015	Re-elected	80.12%	▌ ✓ Aleksandr Karlov (inc.) (UR) 69.21%; ▌ Kondraty Kozhukhar (Independent) 26.30%
Pervomaysky District (Tomsk Oblast)	Irina Sibert (UR) acting mayor	Sep 13, 2015	Elected for a full term	–	▌ ✓ Irina Sibert (inc.) (UR) 36.35%; ▌ Sergey Lansky (Independent) 14.06%; ▌ Aleksandr Petrashov (Independent) 11.65%; ▌ Vladimir Vyazkov (Independent) 9.84%; ▌ Anatoly Sidorov (Independent) 7.66%; ▌ Nikolay Safronov (Independent) 6.53%; ▌ Vladislav Grechman (Independent) 5.37%; ▌ Andrey Tarakanov (Independent) 1.48%; ▌ Lilia Batalova (Independent) 1.38%
Shegarsky District (Tomsk Oblast)	Vladimir Yemelyanov (UR)	Sep 13, 2015	Retiring	53.53%	▌ ✓ Voldemar Margert (UR) 56.44%; ▌ Viktor Ivanov (Independent) 18.00%; ▌ Yevgeny Bogdanov (Independent) 15.92%; ▌ Andrey Krikov (Independent) 5.25%; ▌ Aleksandr Feofilaktov (Independent) 1.20%
Tomsky District (Tomsk Oblast)	Vladimir Lukyanov (UR)	Sep 13, 2015	Re-elected	47.51%	▌ ✓ Vladimir Lukyanov (inc.) (UR) 52.94%; ▌ Viktor Arkashev (Independent) 16.00%; ▌ Andrey Volkov (CPCR) 11.83%; ▌ Vladimir Gauer (Independent) 8.32%; ▌ Maksim Kulbizhekov (LDPR) 4.67%
Zyryansky District (Tomsk Oblast)	Aleksandr Fliginskikh (UR)	Sep 13, 2015	Lost re-election	58.84%	▌ ✓ Nikolay Pivovarov (Independent) 58.76%; ▌ Aleksandr Fliginskikh (inc.) (UR) 32.94%; ▌ Pavel Nikolayev (Independent) 3.57%
Krasnoselkupsky District (Yamalo-Nenets Autonomous Okrug)	Vasily Parshakov (UR)	Sep 13, 2015	Re-elected	74.54%	▌ ✓ Vasily Parshakov (inc.) (UR) 89.15%; ▌ Andrey Frolov (Independent) 9.58%
Tazovsky District (Yamalo-Nenets Autonomous Okrug)	Aleksandr Ivanov (UR)	Sep 13, 2015	Re-elected	65.23%	▌ ✓ Aleksandr Ivanov (inc.) (UR) 89.19%; ▌ Albert Rechapov (Independent) 8.75%
Irkutsky District (Irkutsk Oblast)	Aleksandr Meng (IND) acting mayor	Dec 6, 2015	Withdrew after registration	–	▌ ✓ Leonid Frolov (Independent) 45.75%; ▌ Andrey Poberezhny (UR) 23.44%; ▌ Aleksandr Kuznetsov (CPRF) 23.23%; ▌ Zhanna Nesterova (LDPR) 1.21%; ▌ Nikolay Grigoryev (Young Russia) 0.63%; ▌ Maksim Yevdokimov (Rodina) 0.38%; ▌ Oleg Mikhaylov (GR) 0.36%; ▌ Sergey Yakubov (Smart Russia) 0.35%; ▌ Ivan Dupenko (Independent) 0.26%; ▌ Mikhail Shipunov (Independent) 0.25%
