= Aleksey Kondratyev =

Russian politician (born 1971)

Alexey Kondratyev
- Алексей Кондратьев
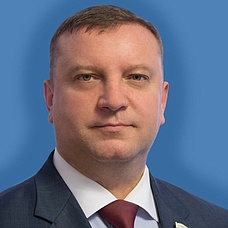

Senator from Tambov Oblast
- Incumbent
- Assumed office 23 September 2025
- Preceded by: Mikhail Belousov

Senator from Kursk Oblast
- In office 17 September 2024 – 22 September 2025
- Preceded by: Grigory Rapota
- Succeeded by: Yevgeniya Lamonova

Mayor of Tambov
- In office 10 October 2010 – 22 September 2015
- Preceded by: Alexey Ilyin
- Succeeded by: Yuri Rogachev

Personal details
- Born: 30 September 1971 (age 55) Pichayevo, RSFSR, Soviet Union
- Party: United Russia
- Education: Penza Artillery Engineering Institute; Combined Arms Academy
- Awards: Order of Courage; Order of Military Merit; Order of Honour; Medal of the Order "For Merit to the Fatherland"

Military service
- Branch/service: Russian Armed Forces
- Rank: Polkovnik
- Unit: VDV; 16th Guards Spetsnaz Brigade
- Battles/wars: First Chechen War; Second Chechen War; Russian Invasion of Ukraine

Alexey Vladimirovich Kondratyev (Russian: Алексей Владимирович Кондратьев; born September 30, 1971, Pichayevo, Pichayevsky District, Tambov Oblast, Soviet Union) is a Russian military officer and a politician. He is a Senator of the Federation Council, representing the executive branch of Tambov Oblast (since September 2025).

He was Mayor of Tambov (2010–2015), and a member of the Federation Council representing the executive branch of Tambov Oblast from 2015 to 2020. He is also a Senator, representing the executive branch of Kursk Oblast (2024–2025). He is a member of the Federation Council Committee on International Affairs and the Federation Council Commission on the Protection of State Sovereignty.

== Biography ==
He was born in the village of Pichayevo, Pichayevsky District, Tambov Oblast. After graduating from secondary school, he studied at the Penza Artillery Engineering Institute (majoring as a mechanical engineer). After graduating from military academy in 1993, he served in the Ulyanovsk Airborne Division. From 1998 to 2010, he served in the Special Forces units of the Main Intelligence Directorate of the General Staff of the Russian Armed Forces.

He served in the Chechnya (participated in both First and Second Chechen wars) and took part in the peacekeeping operation in the autonomous region of Kosovo where he was wounded. From 2001 to 2003, he studied at the Combined Arms Academy of the Armed Forces of the Russian Federation (specializing in management). He served as deputy commander of the 16th Guards Spetsnaz Brigade of the Main Intelligence Directorate of the General Staff of the Russian Armed Forces. He holds the rank of Colonel.

In 2010, Kondratyev topped the United Russia party list in the Tambov City Duma elections. After his election, he was elected Chairman of the City Duma. Since October 2010, he has served as the Mayor of Tambov. Secretary of the Local Political Council of the Tambov Regional Branch of the United Russia Party. Member of the Presidium of the Regional Political Council of the Tambov Regional Branch of the United Russia Party.

On September 22, 2015, by decree of the Head of the Tambov Oblast Administration, he was granted the powers of a member of the Federation Council of the Federal Assembly of the Russian Federation — representative of the executive body of state power of the Tambov Oblast.

In 2022, he returned to the Russian Armed Forces as a volunteer and took part in the Russian invasion of Ukraine. In May 2024, as part of the Time of Heroes personnel program, he completed an internship under the supervision of Pavel Krasheninnikov.

On September 17, 2024, by decree of the Governor of the Kursk Oblast, he was granted the powers of a member of the Federation Council of the Federal Assembly of the Russian Federation — representative of the executive body of state power of the Kursk Oblast. He joined the Federation Council Committee on International Affairs.

On September 23, 2025, he was appointed Senator of the Federation Council - representative of the executive authority of the Tambov Oblast.
