= Pichayevo =

Pichayevo (Russian: Пичаево) is the name of several rural localities in Tambov Oblast, Russia:

- Pichayevo, Pichayevsky District, Tambov Oblast, a selo in Pichayevsky Selsoviet of Pichayevsky District
- Pichayevo, Zherdevsky District, Tambov Oblast, a selo in Pichayevsky Selsoviet of Zherdevsky District
