= Vladimir Babenko =

Ukrainian-born Russian politician

- Владимир Бабенко

1st Head of Tambov Oblast
- In office 11 December 1991 – 24 March 1995
- Succeeded by: Oleg Betin

Personal details
- Born: 20 January 1931 Moshuriv, Talne Raion, Ukrainian Soviet Socialist Republic, Soviet Union
- Died: 24 April 1996 (aged 65) Tambov, Russia

Vladimir Dmitriyevich Babenko (Russian: Владимир Дмитриевич Бабенко; 20 January 1931 – 24 April 1996), was a Ukrainian-born Russian politician who was the first Head of Administration of Tambov Oblast from 1991 to 1995.

Babenko was also a People's Deputy of the RSFSR from 1990 to 1993.

== Biography ==
Vladimir Babenko was born in the family of an employee on 20 January 1931 in the village of Moshuriv, Talne Raion, Cherkasy Oblast, in the Ukrainian Soviet Socialist Republic. In his childhood and youth, he lived in the village of Kanishchevo, in Ryazan Oblast.

In 1965, he graduated from the Ryazan Medical Institute. Upon graduation, Babenko worked as a surgeon at the Ruzaevskaya city hospital in the Mordovian Autonomous Soviet Socialist Republic.

In 1968, he moved to Tambov, and began working as a urologist at the Tambov Regional Hospital. From 1971 to 1977, he was the head of the urological department of the 2nd city hospital. From 1977 to 1991, he was the chief physician of the Tambov Regional Hospital.

For 13 years, as the head physician of the Tambov Regional Hospital, four new buildings and a hostel for medical personnel were built. The departments of therapeutic and surgical nephrology, two cardiology departments were opened.

From 1990 to 1993, Babenko was a People's Deputy of the RSFSR.

On 11 December 1991, Babenko became the first Head of Administration of Tambov Oblast. He left office on 24 March 1995, being replaced by Oleg Betin.

Vladimir Dimitryevich Babenko died on 24 April 1996 in Tambov. He was buried at the Vozdvizhensky cemetery in Tambov.

On 22 November 2013, by the decision of the Tambov Oblast Duma, the regional hospital was named after him.
