= Time of Heroes =

Time of Heroes (Russian: Время героев) is a personnel program for special training, preparation of personnel for civil service and "formation of a new elite" of the Russian Federation among Russian veterans and participants of the Russian invasion of Ukraine. It was launched on March 1, 2024.

== History ==
The program was launched on March 1, 2024. It is implemented on the basis of the Senezh management workshop of the Higher School of Public Administration of the Russian Presidential Academy of National Economy and Public Administration. To study under the program, it is necessary to meet a number of conditions. Among them: Russian citizenship; higher education; experience in personnel management; no criminal record. The program itself is similar to other projects in the field of public administration training, such as "Leaders of Russia" and "School of Governors".

According to the organizers, after the opening of the application period, more than six thousand applications were received in the first three hours, a total of 44,327 applications were accepted. By May 16, 83 program participants had been selected, including four women, 53 senior, 24 junior and two senior officers, as well as three privates. Of these, 20 are Heroes of the Russian Federation.

On May 27, 2024, the training of the first program participants began. On June 2, the program participants set off for the North Pole on board the icebreaker 50 Years of Victory, where they continued their training.

On June 14, Russian president Vladimir Putin met with the program participants. According to the Russian president, program participants can decide for themselves where they will continue their careers - in the army or in the civil service.

On August 26, 2024, the chairman of the lower house of the Russian parliament Vyacheslav Volodin signed an order for the participants of the Time of Heroes program to undergo an internship in the State Duma. According to the document, this internship is part of the program itself and is conducted to develop the necessary knowledge and skills in the field of public administration. Representatives of United Russia, the Liberal Democratic Party of Russia, the Communist Party of the Russian Federation, and A Just Russia expressed their readiness to begin working with the participants of the Time of Heroes. First Deputy Speaker Alexander Zhukov became a mentor for the deputy of the People's Council of the Luhansk People's Republic Yan Leshchenko; Deputy Speaker Irina Yarovaya - for the medic Alexandra Rodionova; the head of the Committee on Ecology, Natural Resources and Environmental Protection Dmitry Kobylkin - for the deputy chairman of the Legislative Assembly of Zabaykalsky Krai Alexander Sapozhnikov.

According to the head of the personnel program Sergey Kiriyenko, the second stream of training within the framework of the Time of Heroes will last from November 15, 2024, to January 15, 2025. The candidates include participants who distinguished themselves during military operations, but at the time of the opening of the first stream of the program they lacked the qualifications and knowledge. In early February 2025, Sergei Kiriyenko announced that among the applicants who applied to participate in the second wave of the "Time of Heroes" program, the share of Heroes of Russia increased by 53% compared to the first wave, and the share of holders of four Orders of Courage increased by 18 times, three - by nine times, two orders - by 47 times. The total number of applications for participation in the project was 65,500.

== Regional analogues of the program ==
In late November 2024, vice-governors for domestic policy were instructed to create analogues of the "Time of Heroes" program in their regions. The Vedomosti publication noted that similar projects have already begun to appear locally, for example, the "School of Heroes" in the Samara Oblast. The launch of a program similar to "Time of Heroes" was previously announced by the acting governor of the Tambov Oblast, Yevgeny Pervyshov. Later, Russian president Vladimir Putin spoke about the need to expand the project to the regions and launch programs similar to those that had already been implemented in the Belgorod, Voronezh, Ryazan, Samara, Tula oblasts Stavropol Krai and the Khanty-Mansi Autonomous Okrug. He also called for attention to the practice of broad and transparent selection, stating that anyone from a private to a commander can apply to participate in the "Time of Heroes".

In December 2024, the governor of the Chelyabinsk Oblast Aleksey Teksler announced that an analogue of the "Time of Heroes" would be launched in the region. Later, he invited Hero of Russia Albert Zainullin to participate in the educational program "Heroes of the Southern Urals".

At the end of January 2025, the acting head of the Jewish Autonomous Oblast announced the launch of an analogue of the "Time of Heroes" platform in the region - "Valor of Khingan". Earlier, the head of Kabardino-Balkaria, Kazbek Kokov, announced the launch of an analogue and continuation of the "Time of Heroes" program in the republic "Heroes of the Kabardino-Balkarian Republic".

In February 2025, the creation of a regional analogue began in the Kirov Oblast, Altai Krai and the Republic of Bashkortostan. On February 7, 2025, an analogue of the "Time of Heroes" "Heroes of YOUR Time. Smolensk" was launched in the Smolensk Oblast.
