= Maksim Yegorov =

Russian politician

- Максим Егоров
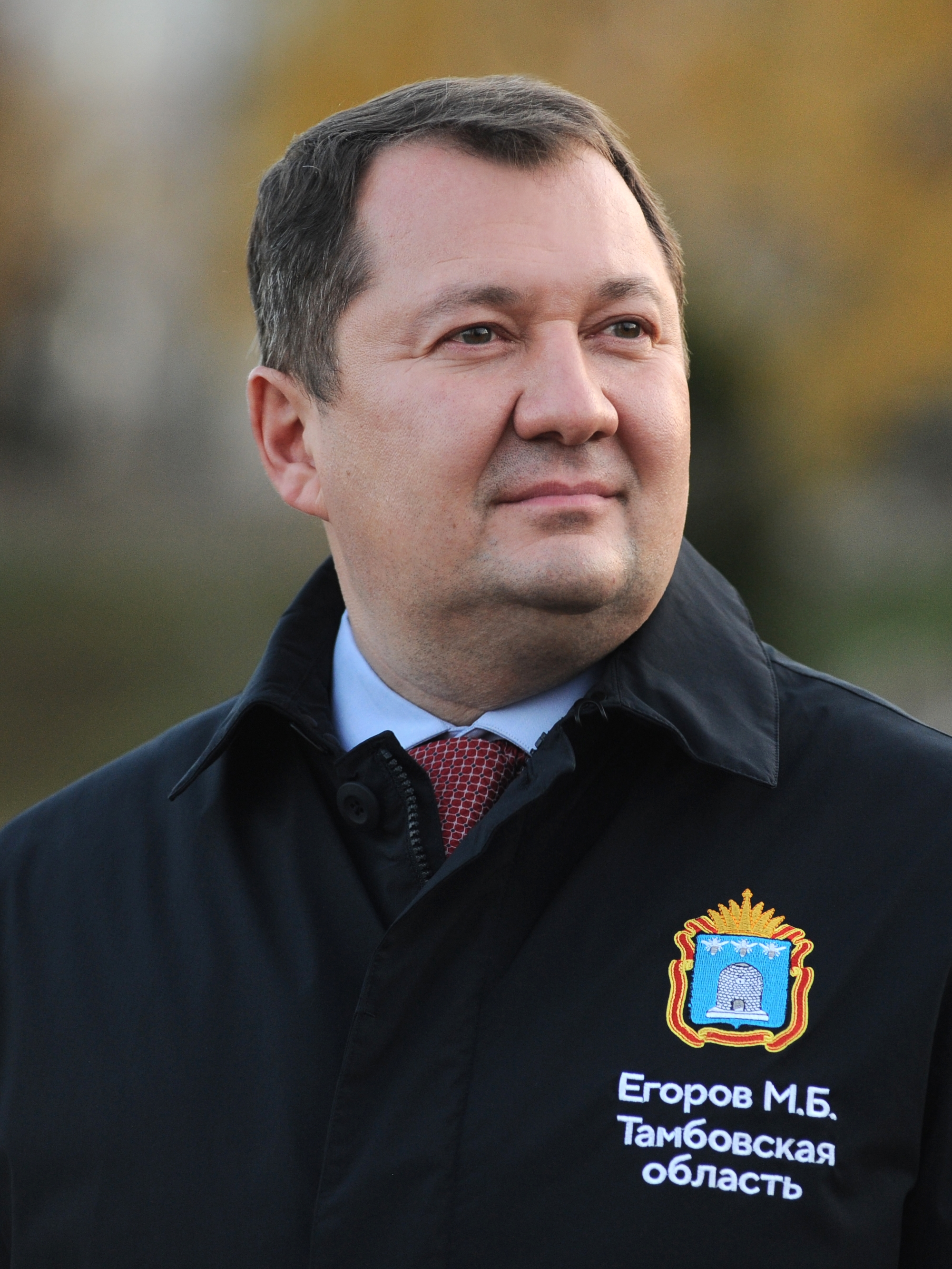
- Yegorov in 2021

Head of Tambov Oblast
- In office 4 October 2021 – 4 November 2024
- Preceded by: Aleksandr Nikitin
- Succeeded by: Yevgeny Pervyshov

Deputy Minister of Construction, Housing and Utilities
- In office 29 December 2018 – 4 October 2021
- Prime Minister: Dmitry Medvedev; Mikhail Mishustin
- Minister: Vladimir Yakushev; Irek Faizullin

Personal details
- Born: Maksim Borisovich Yegorov; 23 May 1977 (age 49) Gorky, Gorky Oblast, Russian SFSR, Soviet Union
- Party: United Russia (since 2021)
- Children: 3
- Education: Volga State Academy of Water Transport

Maksim Borisovich Yegorov (Russian: Максим Борисович Егоров; born 23 May 1977) is a Russian politician. He was the Head of Tambov Oblast from 2021 to 2024.

== Biography ==
Maksim Yegorov was born on 23 May 1977 in Gorky (now Nizhny Novgorod).

In 1999 Yegorov graduated Volga State Academy of Water Transport.

After graduation Maksim Yegorov worked as a specialist I class and leading specialist in the Department of Economy, Industry and Planning at the Administration of Leninsky District of Nizhny Novgorod until 2000. in 2000-2005 Yegorov worked in Nizhnovenergo — main electricity provider in Nizhny Novgorod Oblast — as an economist and deputy director for economy - head of the department of planning and economy.

In 2005 Yegorov transferred to the federal level and joined the Federal Tariff Service's Department of Regulation and Control in Electric Power Industry. He later became head of the Department, Yegorov served in that position until 2015, when the Federal Tariff Service was abolished.

In 2016 Maksim Yegorov started working for the Representative Office of Tyumen Oblast in Moscow and later became counsellor to Tyumen Oblast Governor Vladimir Yakushev.

Yakushev was appointed as Minister of Construction, Housing and Utilities in May 2018 and he was joined by Yegorov as his counsellor. On 29 December 2018 Maksim Yegorov was appointed as Deputy Minister of Construction. In this position Yegorov oversaw regulatory activities in housing and public utilities (ZhKKh), monitoring and analysis in ZhKKh, public-private partnership in ZhKKh, major maintenance and emergency hosing liquidation. Since 11 December 2019 Maksim Yegorov simultaneously served as Chief State Housing Inspector.

On 4 October 2021 the governor of Tambov Oblast, Aleksandr Nikitin asked President Vladimir Putin for permission to resign. Putin accepted the resignation and appointed Maksim Yegorov as acting Head of Tambov Oblast.

On 4 November 2024 Yegorov resigned from office and was replaced by Yevgeny Pervyshov.

On 24 July 2025, Yegorov was arrested on bribery charges.

== Personal life ==
Maksim Yegorov is married. He has three sons.

== Honours ==
- Actual State Advisor I class
- Certificate of Honor of the Government of the Russian Federation
- Russian Federation Presidential Certificate of Honour
- Honorary Worker of Fuel and Energy Complex
- Honorary Worker of Prices and Tariffs Regulation Authorities
