= Head of Tambov Oblast =

Highest-ranking official in Tambov Oblast, Russia

- Глава Тамбовской области
- Coat of arms of Tambov Oblast

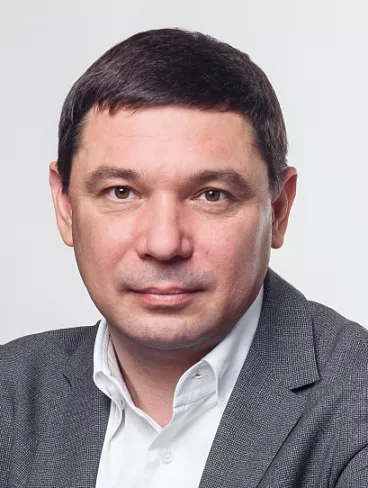
- Incumbent; Yevgeny Pervyshov since 23 September 2025
- Residence: Tambov
- Term length: 5 years
- Formation: 1991
- First holder: Vladimir Babenko
- Website: www.tambov.gov.ru

The Head of Tambov Oblast (Russian: Глава Тамбовской области) is the head of government of that region of Russia.

== History of office ==
In the late 1991, the President of Russia Boris Yeltsin appointed the first heads of the newly established post-Soviet executive authorities in the regions. On 11 December 1991 Vladimir Babenko, chief of Tambov regional hospital and people's deputy of the RSFSR, was appointed head of administration of Tambov Oblast. Later this region refused to rename the office into governor, as most of other oblasts did.

The title of office was changed to head of Tambov Oblast in 2022.

== List ==
#	Portrait	Head	Tenure	Time in office	Party	Election
1		Vladimir Babenko (1931–1996)	11 December 1991 – 24 March 1995 (resigned)	3 years, 103 days	Independent	Appointed
2		Oleg Betin (1950–2023)	24 March 1995 – 29 December 1995 (lost election)	280 days	Our Home – Russia	Appointed
3		Aleksandr Ryabov (1936–2019)	29 December 1995 – 31 December 1999 (lost re-election)	4 years, 2 days	Communist Party	1995
(2)		Oleg Betin (1950–2023)	31 December 1999 – 25 May 2015 (resigned)	15 years, 145 days	Independent	1999; 2003; 2005; 2010
(2)		Oleg Betin (1950–2023)	31 December 1999 – 25 May 2015 (resigned)	15 years, 145 days	United Russia	1999; 2003; 2005; 2010
—		Aleksandr Nikitin (born 1976)	25 May 2015 – 22 September 2015	6 years, 132 days	United Russia	Acting
4		Aleksandr Nikitin (born 1976)	22 September 2015 – 4 October 2021 (resigned)	6 years, 132 days	United Russia	2015; 2020
—		Maksim Yegorov (born 1977)	4 October 2021 – 28 September 2022	3 years, 31 days	United Russia	Acting
5		Maksim Yegorov (born 1977)	28 September 2022 – 4 November 2024 (resigned)	3 years, 31 days	United Russia	2022
—		Yevgeny Pervyshov (born 1976)	4 November 2024 – 23 September 2025	1 year, 307 days	United Russia	Acting
6		Yevgeny Pervyshov (born 1976)	23 September 2025 – present	1 year, 307 days	United Russia	2025
