= Aleksandr Ryabov (politician) =

Russian politician (1936–2019)

- Александр Рябов
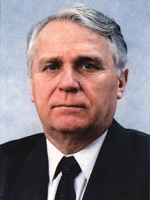

3rd Head of Tambov Oblast
- In office 27 December 1995 – 26 December 1999
- Preceded by: Oleg Betin
- Succeeded by: Oleg Betin

Chairman of the Tambov Oblast Duma
- In office 21 April 1994 – 27 December 1995
- Succeeded by: Vladimir Karev

Chairman of the Tambov Regional Executive Committee of the Council of People's Deputies
- In office June 1985 – 11 December 1991
- Preceded by: Yevgeny Podolsky
- Succeeded by: position abolished

Personal details
- Born: Aleksandr Ivanovich Ryabov; 15 October 1936 Donetsk Oblast, Ukrainian SSR, Soviet Union
- Died: 24 June 2019 (aged 82) Tambov, Russia
- Party: Communist Party of the Russian Federation

Aleksandr Ivanovich Ryabov (Russian: Александр Иванович Рябов; 15 October 1936 – 24 June 2019) was a Russian politician who had served as the 3rd Head of Tambov Oblast from 1995 to 1999. Previously, he was the chairman of the Tambov Oblast Duma.

== Biography ==
Aleksandr Ryabov was born on 15 October 1936 in Donetsk Oblast, Ukrainian SSR.

He graduated from the Michurinsk Fruit and Vegetable Institute, Higher School of Education under the Central Committee of the CPSU, as a Candidate of Philosophical Sciences.

From 1977 to 1982, he was the First Secretary of the Uvarovo City Committee of the CPSU of the Tambov Region. From 1982 to 1985, he was the Secretary of the Tambov Regional Committee of the CPSU.

From 1990 to 1993, he was the People's Deputy of the Russian Federation, as a member of the Communists of Russia faction.

After the August events of 1991, by decree of the President of Russia, he was removed from the post of chairman of the executive committee on charges of supporting the State Emergency Committee, but was immediately elected by the deputies as chairman of the regional Council.

In December 1993, he was elected to the Federation Council of the Russian Federation of the first convocation, was a member of the Committee on Security and Defense. In March 1994 he was elected a member of the Tambov Oblast Duma. On 21 April, he became the chairman of the Tambov Oblast Duma.

In December 1995, Ryabov was elected head of the administration of the Tambov Oblast. From 1996 to December 1999, he was ex officio a member of the Federation Council of the Russian Federation, again headed the Committee on Security and Defense, was a member of the Parliamentary Assembly of the Council of Europe, a member of the Interparliamentary Assembly of the Commonwealth of Independent States countries.

On 19 December 1999, he took second place in the first round of the regular gubernatorial elections in the Tambov Oblast and lost the victory in the second round on 26 December to former governor Oleg Betin.

He died on 25 June 2019 in Tambov. He was buried at the Vozdvizhensky cemetery in Tambov.

== Family ==
His widow has two children.
