= Vladimir Yevlanov =

- Владимир Евланов
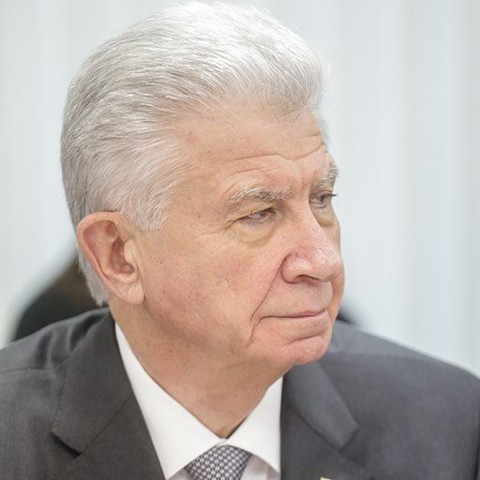

Member of the State Duma
- In office 18 September 2016 – 2021

Mayor of Krasnodar
- In office 22 September 2005 – 8 December 2016
- Preceded by: Nikolay Priz
- Succeeded by: Yevgeny Pervyshov

Personal details
- Born: Vladimir Lazarevich Yevlanov; 3 August 1948 (age 77) Kuybyshev, Russia, Soviet Union
- Party: United Russia

Vladimir Lazarevich Yevlanov (Russian: Владимир Лазаревич Евланов; born on 3 August 1948), is a Russian politician who last served as member of the State Duma of the VII convocation from 2016 to 2021. A member of the United Russia party, he was member of the Committee on Economic Policy, Industry, Innovative Development and Entrepreneurship.

He also served as the head of Krasnodar from 2005 to 2016.

== Biography ==
Vladimir Yevlanov was born in Kuybyshev (present day Samara), on 3 August 1948.

In 1967, he received a secondary and technical education with a degree in Electric Electric Equipment Technical Electric Equipment by graduating from the Kuibyshev Aviation College. In the same year, after graduation, he was drafted for military service in the Soviet Army until 1969.

From 1969 to 1972, then worked as an electrician and an assistant captain on the vessels of the fleet of the Ocean fishing base on Sakhalin, in Korsakov.

Between 1972 and 1984, he worked in various party positions in the Korsakovsky City Executive Committee, was the deputy chairman. In 1979, he graduated from the Khabarovsk Higher Party School, which was engaged in the training of personnel and Soviet workers.

In 1984, Yevlanov, together with his family with Sakhalin, moved to Krasnodar, where he was appointed head of the housing production and operational trust of the Pervomaisky district. In 1985, he was appointed deputy head of the housing and communal services department of the city.

Between 1986 and 1994, he worked as the head of the Gorelhoz production department. In 1991, he received the second higher education graduating from the Faculty of Economics of Kuban State University.

Since 1994, he has worked in the administration of the Central Administrative District of Krasnodar as the head of the district. From 1996 to 2000, he worked as the first deputy administration of Krasnodar.

In 2000, at Kuban State University he defended his thesis on the topic "The economic strategy of the local community on the development of the city’s industry. From 2001 to October 2004, he was the Chairman of the Housing Committee of the Housing and Public Utilities of the Krasnodar Krai.

On 5 October 2004, Yevlanov was appointed first deputy, later acting head of the administration of Krasnodar. On 18 September 2005, he was elected head of Krasnodar., having received 64.75% of the votes as an independent, defeating Aleksandr Kiryushin of the Communist Party of the Russian Federation, with 11.68% of the votes. He officially took office on 22 September.

In 14 March 2010, Yevlanov was reelected the head, with 66.89% of voters voted for him, this time as a United Russia candidate. His nearest rival, candidate from the Communist Party Ivan Chuyev, gained 24.90% of the votes. He officially took office on 22 September.

On 18 September 2016, the State Duma was running for a single -member constituency No. 46, according to the results of the elections, Yevlanov was elected as a member of parliament, a deputy of the State Duma of the VII convocation.

== Legislative activity ==
From 2016 to 2019, during his time as a State Duma member, he acted as a co -author of 33 legislative initiatives and amendments to draft federal laws.

== Criticism ==
In October 2017, the Kuban Voice portal, together with the deputy coordinator of the ecological shift in the North Caucasus, a member of the Association of Ecologists of the Russian Journalists, Dmitry Shevchenko, issued an analytical report on the consequences of Yevlanov as head of Krasnodar from 2004 to 2016. “Evlanov. Results. 2004-2016: History of missed opportunities."

The attention of social activists was the “Foundation for promoting the revival of Orthodox churches”, one of the founders of which is Yvlanov. According to the author of the report, during the construction of the temples there were violations by Yevlanov, a conflict of interests was published, as well as the alienation of municipal land in favor of religious organizations with violation of laws - without trading and without compliance with competitive procedures. The author of the report also indicated many financial violations.

Yevlanov's son led a successful business. His company LLC Group of Companies STM flourished. Shevchenko indicates the reasons for such a success in the business of municipal contracts in Krasnodar and the service of private development projects that depended on the decisions of the city leadership.

Under Yevlanov, according to the author of the report, the Krasnodar public transport system degraded: KTTU MUP was on the verge of bankruptcy and was forced to turn to the new mayor of the city Yevgeny Pervyshov, in July 2017 to help the enterprise get out of the situation.

Shevchenko indicated that the level of wear of city trams for 2017 is about 90%, and trolleybuses - about 80%. And this despite the fact that tariffs for travel in city electric vehicles over 13 years (2004–2017) increased 6 times.

It is also noted that all the large-scale construction sites of transport infrastructure declared by Yevlanov (a 3-hut-out interchange on the Starokuban Ring, a new bridge from Yablonovsky to Krasnodar across the Kuban River, an automobile interchange at the intersection of the Red Partisans and Turgenev, the Krasnodar transit project, southern high-speed bypass) were not implemented)

After Yevlanov left as head of Krasnodar, in December 2016, the city debt to banks amounted to 9 billion rubles, which exceeded 38% of the city's annual income. In 2017, only interest on loans amounted to one and a half billion rubles.
