= Pervomaysky, Pervomaysky District, Tambov Oblast =

Pervomaysky Первомайский
- Urban-type settlement
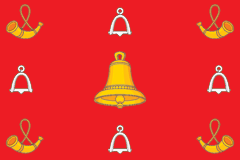
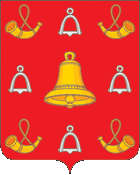
- Flag Coat of arms
- Interactive map of Pervomaysky
- Location of Pervomaysky Pervomaysky (Tambov Oblast)
- Coordinates: 53.2450°N 40.2852°E
- Country: Russia
- Federal subject: Tambov Oblast
- Administrative district: Pervomaysky District

Population (2010 Census)
  - Total: 12,654
  - Estimate (2021): 10,674 (−15.6%)
- Time zone: UTC+3 (MSK)
- Postal code: 393700
- OKTMO ID: 68622151051

Pervomaysky (Russian: Первомайский) is an urban locality (an urban-type settlement) in Pervomaysky District of Tambov Oblast, Russia. Population: 12,654 (2010 census); 13,748 (2002 census); 13,767 (1989 Soviet census).
