= Volga State University of Water Transport =

- Волжский государственный университет водного транспорта
- Other names: VGUVT
- Type: Public
- Established: 1930
- Location: Nizhny Novgorod, Nizhny Novgorod Oblast, Russia

Volga State University of Water Transport (VGUWT) is a Russian educational institution funded by the Federal Agency for Maritime and River Transportation. It is the largest educational institution in the Volga-Vyatka region. At the beginning of 2010, more than 18,000 students and cadets were enrolled. Since its formation, VGUVT (formerly - VGAWT, GIIVT) has prepared more than 46,000 specialists in their areas.

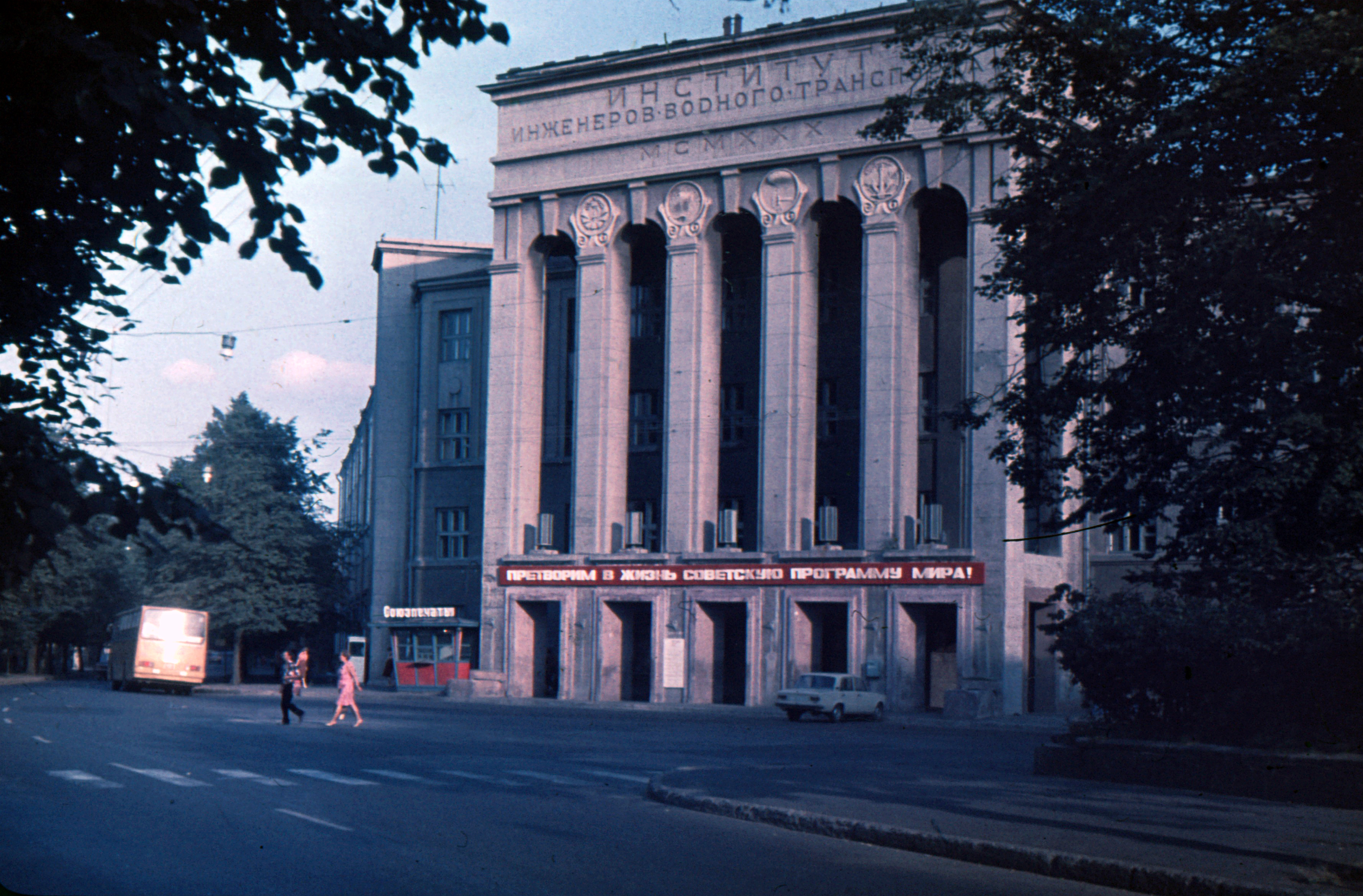
1982

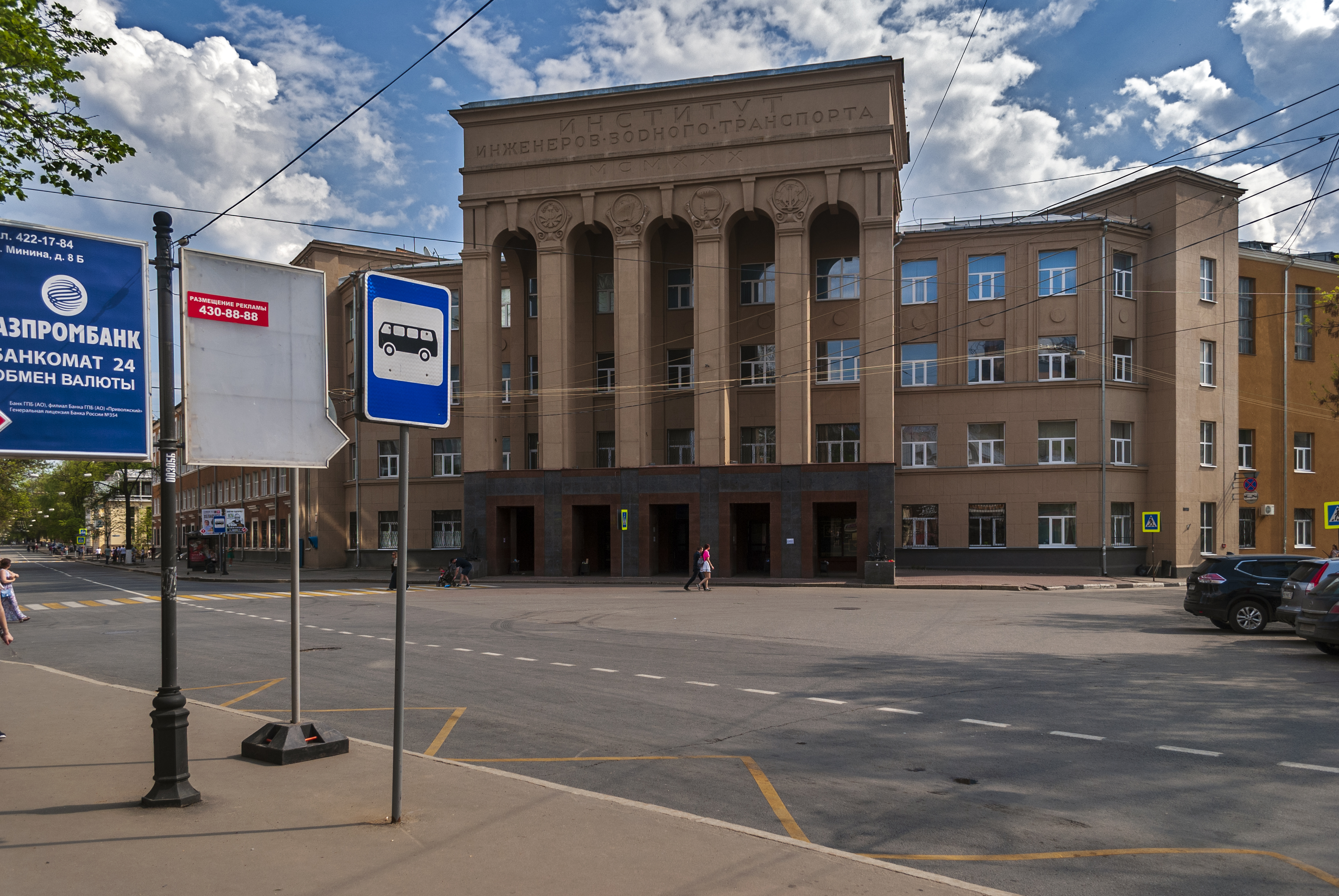
2019

== Programs ==
The university reserves the right to issue documents on the development of a state sample, to award science degrees to candidates of science, as well as to assess doctoral dissertations.

The University consists of three faculties, one Institute (Iefp) and 26 departments.

Two hostels accommodate non-resident students.

The university has a sanatorium-dispensary.

The university newspaper is Aquatoria.

The University hosts a unique museum of the river fleet.

One of the buildings is the former Seraphim Charity House, built for elderly clergy in 1904-1905 with funds from an honorary citizen of Nizhny Novgorod, Alexander Priezzhev. Construction was conducted under the directives of the cathedral archpriest Alexey Porfiryev within the territory of the Makarevskaya almshouse. Since that time the building has been modified: the third floor was added, the belfry and the cupola with the cross of the house church were lost, and the interior has been redeveloped.

For summer holidays, a sports camp, Vodnik, on the coast of the Gorky sea, is made available for staff and students.

== Departments ==
=== Navigation ===
Prepares engineers to navigate for sea and river vessels. The curriculum is includes modern methods and training facilities, including specialized simulators, in compliance with the requirements of the International Convention on the Training and Certification of Seafarers and Watchkeeping. The curriculum meets international and professional requirements, and many graduates become captains.

=== Electromechanical Engineering ===
Prepares engineers to specialize in operation of ship power plants, electrical equipment and automation facilities, operation of port handling equipment and transport terminals and technical operation of transport radio equipment. Graduates work at the Ministry of Transport, in design offices, design organizations, occupy command posts of electromechanical direction at onshore enterprises, in shipping companies and basin management departments.

=== Shipbuilding, Hydraulic Engineering and Environmental Protection ===
Prepares engineers for building ships, construction of waterways, ports, water transport facilities and structures on the sea shelf and engineering environmental protection. Graduates work in design and design organizations, in shipping companies, in river basin departments and in shipbuilding and ship repair.

=== Institute of Economics, Management and Law (IEIiP) ===
Prepares specialists in finance and credit, accounting, analysis and audit, transport company economics and management, organization management, logistics and jurisprudence. Graduates work in shipping companies, ports, basin departments of waterways and shipping, in analytical, audit services, in audit, consulting, marketing firms. Graduate lawyers work in law enforcement agencies and other government institutions.

== Sources ==
1. Official website of university
2. Official website of the Caspian branch
3. Samara Branch Official Website
4. Official site of the Perm branch
5. Official Website Of Volga State University
