= Pichayevo, Pichayevsky District, Tambov Oblast =

Rural locality in Tambov Oblast, Russia

Coordinates: 53°13′59″N 42°12′10″E

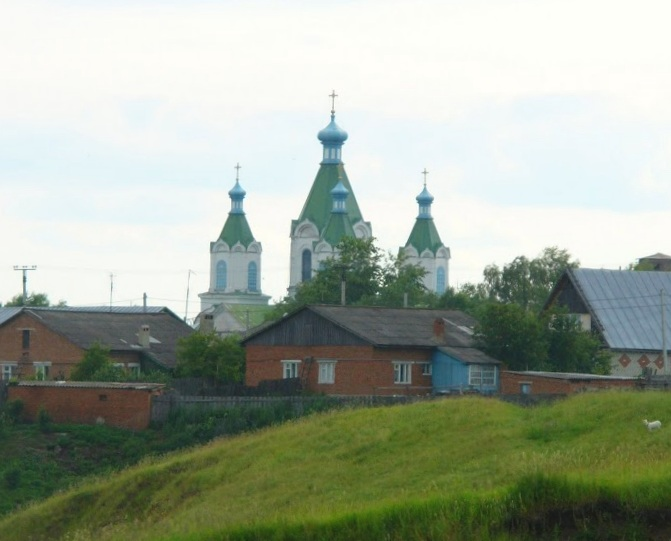
View of Pichaevo

Pichayevo (Russian: Пичаево) is a rural locality (a selo) and the administrative center of Pichayevsky District, Tambov Oblast, Russia. Population: 3,407 (2010 census); 3,568 (2002 census); 3,408 (1989 Soviet census).
