= Oleg Betin =

Russian politician (1950–2023)

- Олег Бетин
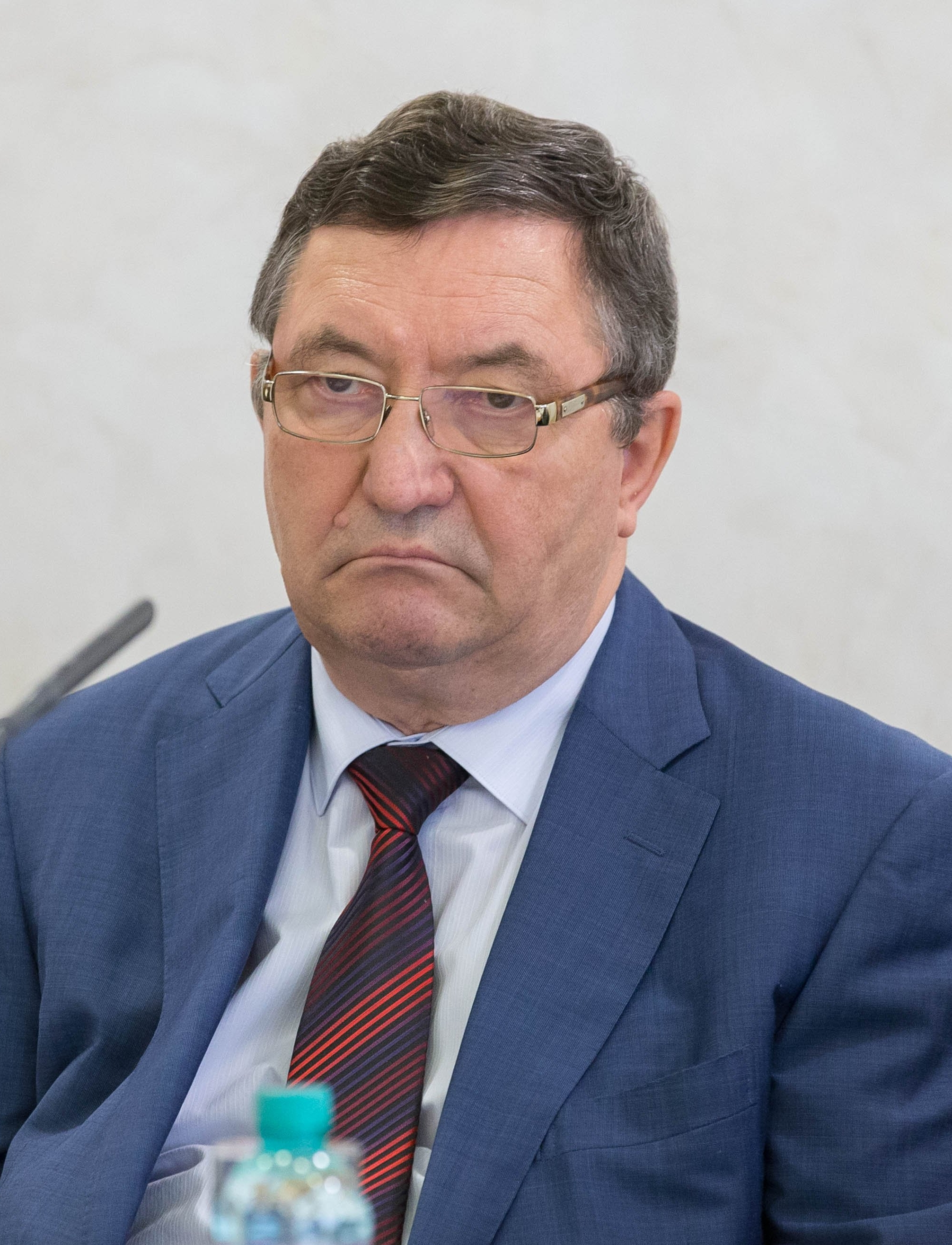
- Betin in 2016

2nd Head of Administration of Tambov Oblast
- In office 24 December 1999 – 25 May 2015
- Preceded by: Aleksandr Ryabov
- Succeeded by: Aleksandr Nikitin
- In office 24 March 1995 – 27 December 1995
- Preceded by: Vladimir Babenko
- Succeeded by: Aleksandr Ryabov

Personal details
- Born: Oleg Ivanovich Betin; 25 August 1950; Tambov, Russian SFSR, USSR
- Died: 17 June 2023 (aged 72)
- Political party: United Russia

Oleg Ivanovich Betin (Russian: Олег Иванович Бетин; 25 August 1950 – 17 June 2023) was a governor of Tambov Oblast in Russia. He was a member of Our Home – Russia party. In 1995 he became governor. He was re-elected on 7 December 2003 with around 70% of the votes cast. Under Betin, Tambov Oblast provided food shipments to war-torn Chechnya in 2000.

Betin died from cancer on 17 June 2023, at the age of 72.

== Family ==
Betin is married, and has two children and three grandchildren. In his free time, he enjoys carpentry and gardening [source not cited for 4198 days].

His wife, Tamara Petrovna Betina, heads the Tambov Regional Public Foundation for the Revival of Orthodox Shrines.

His son, Vyacheslav Olegovich Betin (born 1980), has led several businesses in Tambov (such as City Design Bureau LLC and Real LLC). In 2005, he was elected a deputy of the Tambov City Duma. Since 2006, he has been the majority owner (68% of the charter capital) and CEO of a large construction holding — Tambov Investment Company LLC, which includes Tambov Design Institute LLC, Tambov Construction Company LLC, Tambov Reinforced Concrete Plant LLC, and TKS Center Management Company LLC.

His daughter, Ekaterina Olegovna Betina, graduated from Tambov State University.

== Controversies ==
One episode of the “Special Correspondent” program on the Russia-1 TV channel focused on abuses in the housing and utilities sector of the city of Tambov. The main subjects of this journalistic investigation were the governor of the region Oleg Betin, his son Vyacheslav Betin, deputy Andrey Popov, and ordinary residents of the city.

== Scandals ==
One episode of the program Special Correspondent on the Russia-1 television channel focused on abuses in the housing and utilities sector of the city of Tambov. The main figures featured in the investigative report were the region's governor Oleg Betin, his son Vyacheslav Betin, deputy Andrey Popov, and local residents.

== Awards and honors ==
- Order of Honour (2000)
- Order For Merit to the Fatherland 4th class (2004)
- Order For Merit to the Fatherland 3rd class (2010)
- The Order of Friendship (2023)
- Gratitude of the President of the Russian Federation (1996, 2005)
