= Aleksandr Nikitin (politician, born 1976) =

Russian economist (born 1976)

- Александр Никитин
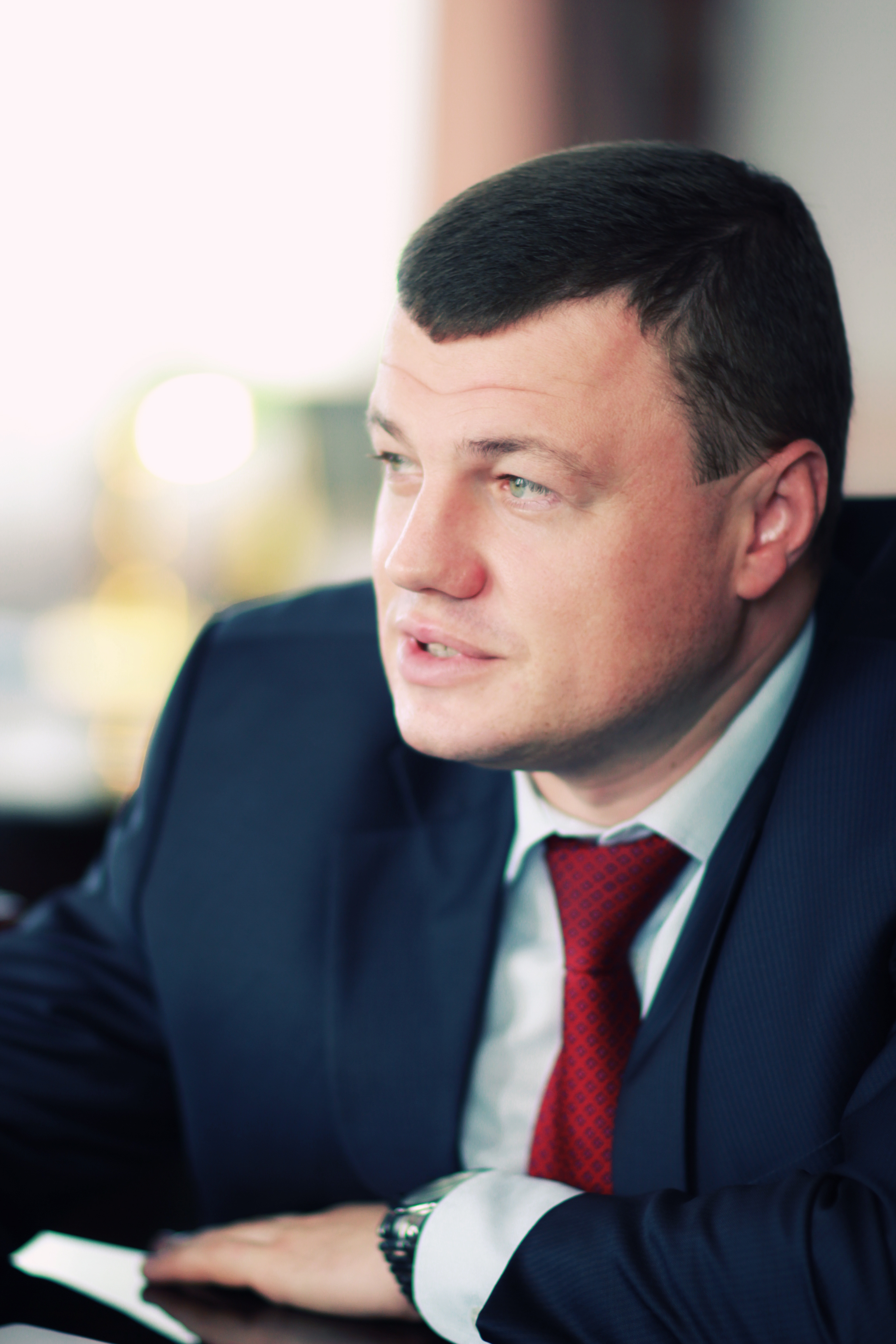
- Nikitin in 2012

Russian Federation Senator from Tambov Oblast
- In office 7 October 2021 – 28 September 2026
- Preceded by: Svetlana Korostelyova
- Succeeded by: Aleksey Puchnin

5th Head of Administration of Tambov Oblast
- In office 22 September 2015 – 4 October 2021
- Preceded by: Oleg Betin
- Succeeded by: Maksim Yegorov

Head of Administration of Tambov Oblast (acting)
- In office 25 May 2015 – 22 September 2015

Chairman of the Tambov Oblast Duma
- In office 30 March 2011 – 25 May 2015
- Preceded by: Vladimir Karyev
- Succeeded by: Vladimir Karyev

Personal details
- Born: Aleksandr Valeryevich Nikitin; 26 April 1976 (age 50) Michurinsk, Tambov Oblast, RSFSR, Soviet Union
- Party: United Russia
- Spouse: Tatyana Nikitina

Aleksandr Valeryevich Nikitin (Russian: Александр Валерьевич Никитин; born 26 April 1976) is a Russian statesman who is currently the Senator from Tambov Oblast since 7 October 2021. He was the 5th Head of Administration of Tambov Oblast since 22 September 2015 to 4 October 2021. He is a member of the Supreme Council of the United Russia party.

Nikitin had served as the Chairman of the Tambov Oblast Duma from 2011 to 2015.

== Early life and education ==
Aleksandr Niktin was born in Michurinsk on 26 April 1976. In his youth, he was engaged in boxing for nine years, was the winner of the boxing tournament of the RSFSR, became a candidate for master of sports.

He graduated from school in Michurinsk with a gold medal. He entered the university (then still the IV Michurin Fruit and Vegetable Institute) with a degree in finance and credit. From the second year, he became interested in financial analytics and began to engage in science: he wrote articles, spoke at conferences. Together with classmates, he took part in the analysis of the financial condition of the educational economy of MichGAU "Grove".

After graduating from the university in 1998, Nikitin entered the postgraduate course of the All-Russian Institute of Agrarian Problems and Informatics named after A. A. Nikonova. He defended his candidate dissertation under the guidance of Academician A. Petrikov a year ahead of schedule in 2000, and was left to work at the institute.

In the same place in 2009, he defended his doctoral dissertation on the topic: "State support for insurance of agricultural risks: theory, methodology and practice.".

== Career ==
In 2000, he began his career as a consultant on financial and economic issues of the Fund for Supporting Agrarian Reform and Rural Development of Russia. In 2003, he was appointed head of the agricultural risks insurance department of the open insurance joint-stock company "Russia".

From 2004 he worked as Vice-Rector for Economics and Innovation, Michurinsky State Agrarian University, and from 2009 to 2011, he was promoted to Rector of Michurinsky State Agrarian University.

He was included in the personnel reserve - the professional team of the country - in the direction of "Social sphere.

The academic degree of Doctor of Economics was awarded by the Higher Attestation Commission of the Ministry of Education and Science of the Russian on 17 July 2009. The academic title of professor in the department of organization and management of production was awarded by order of the Federal Service for Supervision in Education and Science of the Russia of 17 February 2010.

He is the author of over 135 scientific publications, including 25 books and collections of articles, textbooks, 27 monographs, including "Theory and Practice of Agricultural Risk Insurance" in 2008). He is a co-author of a number of educational and scientific publications: "Sustainable development of sugar beet production: a regional aspect" (2010), "Accounting and taxation in farms" (2013), etc.

Nikitin is also a member of the expert council of the journal "Bulletin of Michurinsky State Agrarian University", a member of the board of the all-Russian public organization "Russian Public Association (Association) of Agricultural Economists" and a member of the Board of the Free Economic Society of Russia.

== Political career ==
In 2010, Nikitin was elected a member of the Michurinsky City Council of Deputies of the fourth convocation.

In March 2011, he was elected a member of parliament, a deputy in Michurinsky single-mandate constituency No. 7, and a chairman of the Tambov Oblast Duma of the fifth convocation.

He is a member of the All-Russian political party "United Russia", and a member of the public organization "Russian Public Association (Association) of Agricultural Economists".

In June 2011, he was the Secretary of the Regional Political Council of the Tambov Regional Branch of the All-Russian political party "United Russia".

He was a member of the faction of "United Russia" party in the Tambov Oblast Duma.

According to the version announced in the Kommersant newspaper, Nikitin's political career began after a meeting with Vladimir Putin, who liked Nikitin at the United Russia congress and has since helped him to stay in power.

On 25 May 2015, Nikitin was appointed acting head of Tambov Oblast after the resignation of Oleg Betin. On 13 September 2015, he was elected head of the administration of the Tambov region. According to the results of the elections, Nikitin received 425,316 votes, which is 85.47% of the number of those who took part in the voting. On 22 September 2015, in the Great Hall of the regional administration, a ceremony of Nikitin's inauguration as head of the Tambov Oblast took place. Nikitin took an oath on the unique edition of the Charter of the Tambov Oblast.

In June 2020, he was elected secretary of the regional branch of the "United Russia" At the same time, having enlisted the support of President Putin, Nikitin submits documents for nomination as a candidate for the election of the governor of the Tambov region in the fall of 2020.

During the Single Election Day in September 2020, in the elections for the Governor of the Tambov Oblast, Nikitin, having gained 79.30% of the votes with a turnout of 64.60% of the total number of registered voters, outstripped all his opponents, won his reelection, and continued to work as the head of the region.

=== Criminal prosecution of a journalist ===
On November 2, 2018, a local journalist Stanislav Savonchik was detained at the Michurinsk railway station as part of the investigation of a criminal case of libel (Article 128.1 of the Criminal Code) against Governor Nikitin and his deputy, Oleg Ivanov, due to an interview with political scientist Yury Antsiferov. Later, the Dozhd TV channel published an audio recording of Nikitin's speech at the board of the prosecutor's office of the Tambov Oblast, in which he said: "Please agree that it be submitted to the court, because it is under the control of the internal policy department of the presidential administration." The administration of the Tambov Oblast confirmed the authenticity of the recording, but said that the governor had made a "personal request". Press Secretary of the Russian President Dmitry Peskov said that the Department of Internal Policy was not the initiator of this criminal case. After that, the criminal case was closed due to the lack of corpus delicti; for a year and a half of the investigation, to this day, no one was charged with it.

== Personal life ==
He is married to Tatyana, and has three children.
