= Yevgeny Pervyshov =

Russian politician

- Евгений Первышов
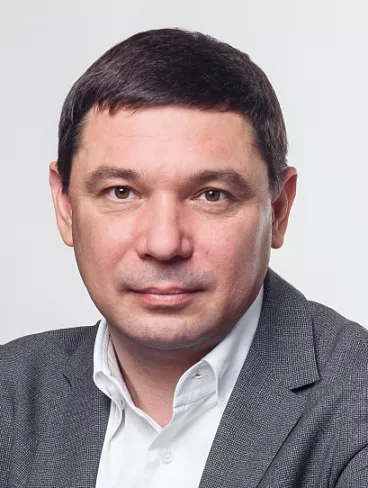

Head of Tambov Oblast
- Incumbent
- Assumed office 23 September 2025; Acting: 4 November 2024 – 23 September 2025
- Preceded by: Maksim Yegorov

Member of the State Duma for Krasnodar Krai
- In office 12 October 2021 – 4 November 2024
- Preceded by: Vladimir Yevlanov
- Constituency: Krasnodar (No. 46)

Mayor of Krasnodar
- In office 8 October 2016 – 23 September 2021
- Preceded by: Vladimir Yevlanov
- Succeeded by: Andrey Alekseyenko

Personal details
- Born: 4 May 1976 (age 50) Krasnodar, Russian SFSR USSR
- Party: United Russia
- Education: Kuban State Technological University

Yevgeny Alexeyevich Pervyshov (Russian: Евгений Алексеевич Первышов, born 4 May 1976 in Krasnodar) is a Russian politician serving as Head of Tambov Oblast since September 2025. He previously served as a deputy of the 8th State Duma and mayor of Krasnodar.

== Career ==
From 2005 to 2010, Pervyshov was a deputy of the City Duma of Krasnodar of the 4th convocation. In 2006, he joined the A Just Russia — For Truth. In 2010-2012, he was the deputy of the City Duma of Krasnodar of the 5th convocation. In 2012, he joined the Rodina party, but the next year he moved to the United Russia. On 8 October 2016 he was appointed the mayor of Krasnodar. He left the post in September 2021 to become deputy of the 8th State Duma. While serving as a legislator, Pervyshov volunteered to serve in the Russian military fighting in Ukraine in 2022 and was selected into the "Time of Heroes" program, which aims to elevate war veterans into influential civil service roles.

On 4 November 2024, Pervyshov was appointed as governor of Tambov Oblast by President Vladimir Putin.

== Sanctions ==
Due to his support for the violation of Ukraine’s territorial integrity during the Russo-Ukrainian war, he is subject to personal international sanctions imposed by multiple countries. Since February 23, 2022, he has been under sanctions by all member states of the European Union.

Since March 11, 2022, he has also been under sanctions by the United Kingdom. On March 24, 2022, he was added to the U.S. sanctions list for “participating in Putin’s war” and “supporting the Kremlin’s efforts to invade Ukraine”.

On February 24, 2022, Canada included him in its sanctions list of “close associates of the regime” for voting in favor of recognizing the independence of the “so-called republics in Donetsk and Luhansk”. He has been under Swiss sanctions since February 25, 2022, under Australian sanctions since February 26, 2022, and under Japanese sanctions since April 12, 2022. On September 7, 2022, he was sanctioned by Ukraine pursuant to a decree signed by President Volodymyr Zelenskyy. On May 3, 2022, New Zealand also imposed sanctions against him.

In October 2022, amid Russia’s invasion of Ukraine, Pervyshov announced that he was heading to the “special operation” zone after undergoing training in Rostov Oblast. On January 31, 2023, he was photographed during a meeting with Governor Veniamin Kondratyev in Krasnodar. He later stated that he had returned to the city “for a few days”.

In 2024, he took part in the leadership development program Time of Heroes. On October 4, 2024, he was appointed acting governor of Tambov Oblast.
