= Mikhail Belousov =

Russian politician (born 1953)

- Михаил Белоусов
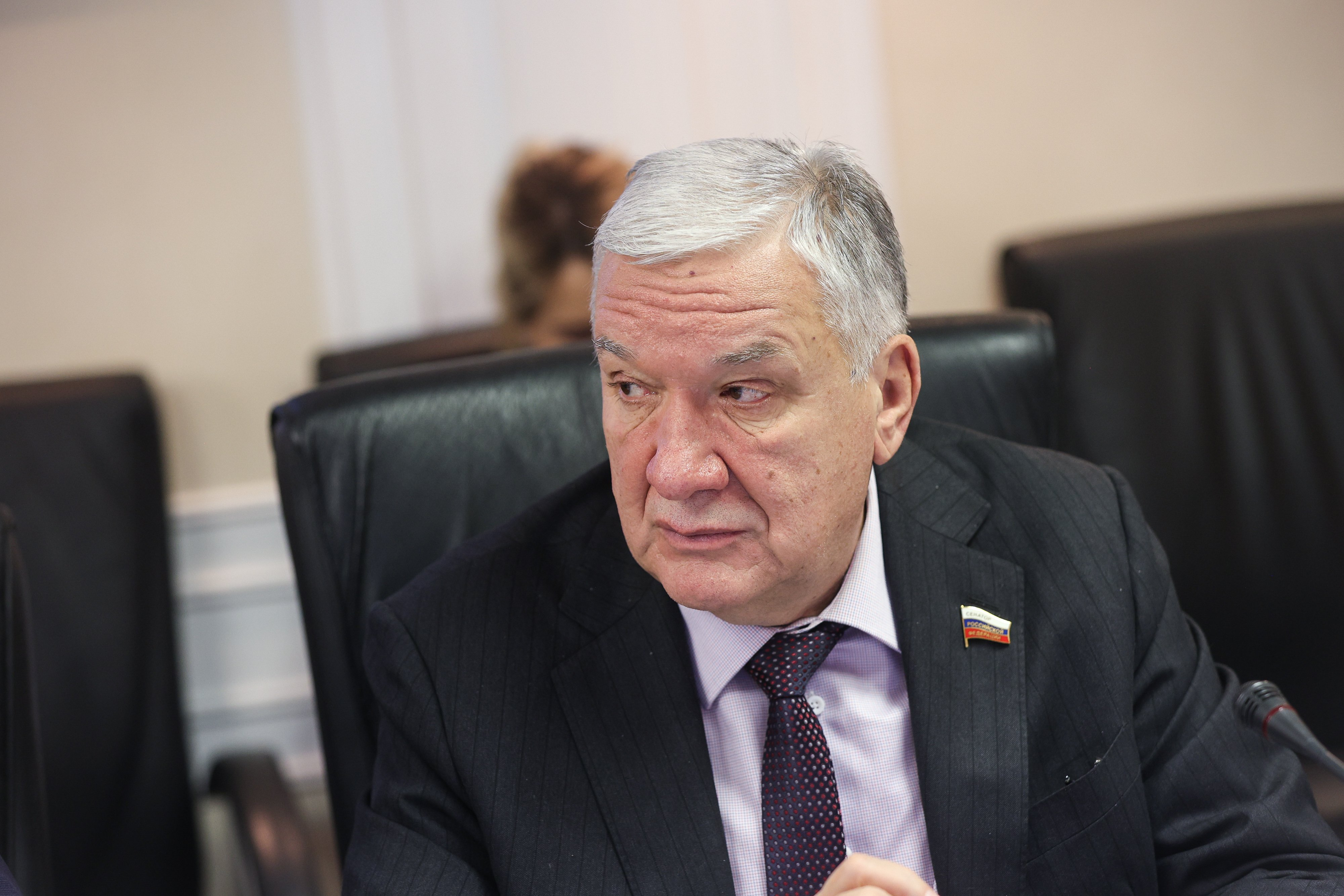
- Belousov in 2023

Senator from Tambov Oblast
- Incumbent
- Assumed office 13 December 2021
- Preceded by: Alexander Babakov

Personal details
- Born: Mikhail Belousov; 11 October 1953 (age 72) Yuzhno-Sakhalinsk, Russian Soviet Federative Socialist Republic, Soviet Union
- Party: United Russia
- Education: Grozny State Oil Technical University

Mikhail Vladimirovich Belousov (Russian: Михаил Владимирович Белоусов; born 11 October 1953) is a Russian politician serving as a senator from Tambov Oblast since 13 December 2021.

== Career ==
Mikhail Belousov was born on 11 October 1953 in Yuzhno-Sakhalinsk. In 1976, he graduated from the Grozny State Oil Technical University. From the beginning of the 1990s, he started to work on the issues of domestic policy in the Presidential Administration of Russia. Afterward, he also served at the Security Council of Russia where he held the leadership positions. In 2012, Belousov was appointed the first deputy head of the service for the protection of the constitutional order and the fight against terrorism of the Federal Security Service. On 13 December 2021, he became the senator from Tambov Oblast.

== Awards ==
2005 - Order of Honour

2008 - Order "For Merit to the Fatherland", IV degree

2018 - Order of Alexander Nevsky

== Sanctions ==
Mikhail Belousov is under personal sanctions introduced by the European Union, the United Kingdom, the United States, Canada, Switzerland, Australia, Ukraine, New Zealand, for ratifying the decisions of the "Treaty of Friendship, Cooperation and Mutual Assistance between the Russian Federation and the Donetsk People's Republic and between the Russian Federation and the Luhansk People's Republic" and providing political and economic support for Russia's annexation of Ukrainian territories.

== Awards ==
- Medal "For the Defence of the Republic of Crimea" (2015)
