= Tambov Oblast Duma =

Regional parliament of Tambov Oblast, Russia

Tambov Oblast Duma Тамбовская областная дума
- 7th legislature

Type
- Type: Unicameral

Leadership
- Chairman: Yevgeny Matushkin, United Russia since 10 December 2015

Structure
- Seats: 50
- Political groups: United Russia (42) CPRF (3); Rodina (3); LDPR (1) SRZP (1)

Elections
- Voting system: Mixed
- Last election: 19 September 2021
- Next election: 2026

Meeting place
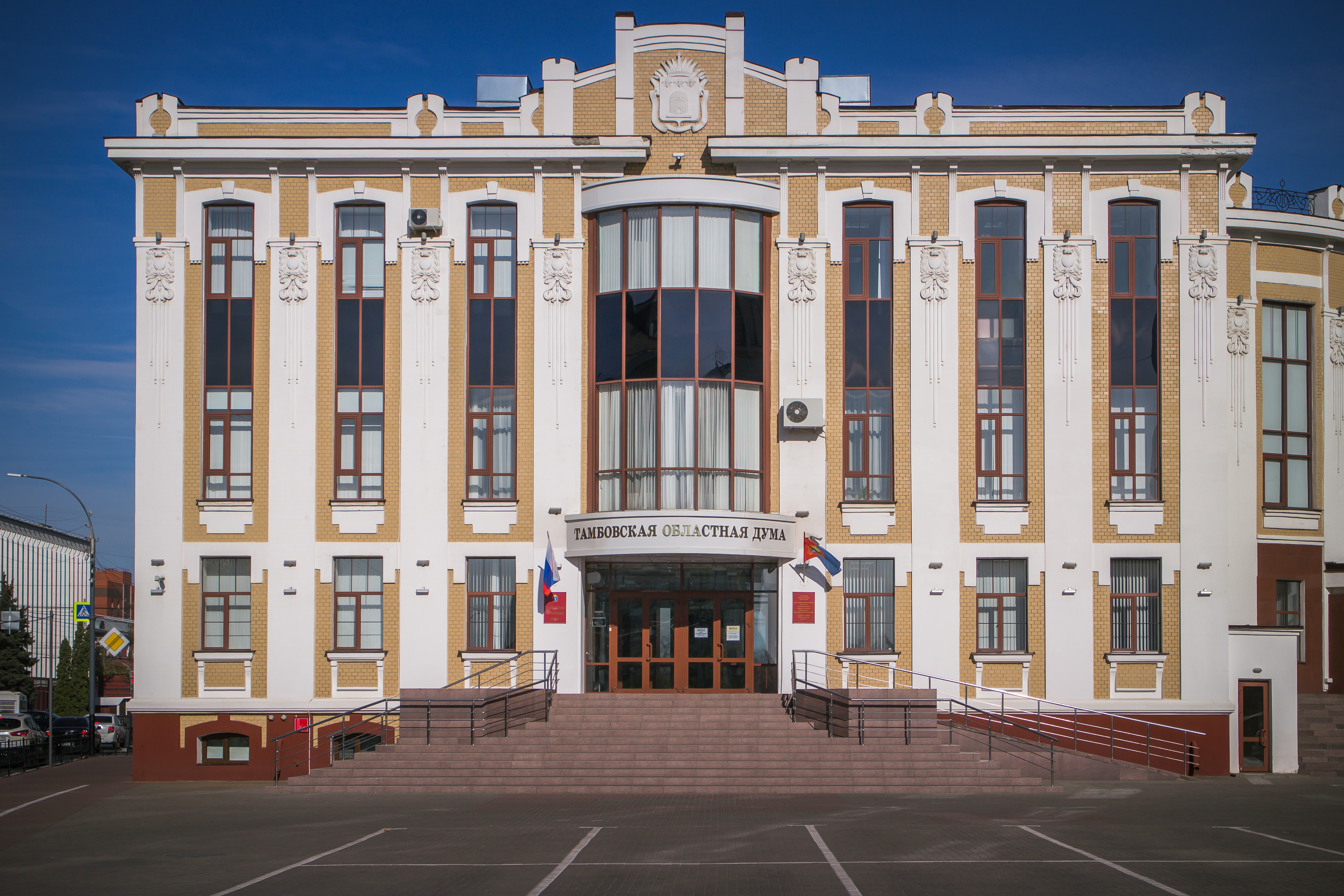
- 143/22 Karl Marx Street, Tambov

Website
- tambovoblduma.ru

The Tambov Oblast Duma (Russian: Тамбовская областная дума, romanized: Tambovskaya oblastnaya duma) is the regional parliament of Tambov Oblast, a federal subject of Russia. A total of 50 deputies are elected for five-year terms. 25 deputies are elected by single-member constituencies and 25 deputies are elected in party lists. The current chairman is Yevgeny Matushkin.

== History ==
Elections to the Tambov Oblast Duma of the first convocation were held on 27 March 1994, with 30 deputies being elected, and its first meeting being held on 22 April 1994. 41% of registered voters took part in the elections. Aleksandr Ryabov was elected chairman of the oblast duma and resigned in December 1995 to become the head of the region, being succeeded by vice-chairman Vladimir Karev.

In 1994, the Charter of Tambov Oblast was adopted, becoming the basis of legislation in the region. The Charter was recognized as constitutional by the Constitutional Court of Russia in 1997.

In 1997, elections to the duma of the second convocation were held, with the number of deputies increased to 50. Only 46 deputies were elected, as the results in four constituencies were declared invalid as they had a turnout of less than 25%. Vladimir Karev was again re-elected as chairman. The duma of the second convocation adopted 241 laws and 1175 resolutions.

== Elections ==
=== 2016 ===
Party	%	Seats
United Russia	62.25	44
Communist Party of the Russian Federation	11.90	3
Rodina	8.82	1
Liberal Democratic Party of Russia	8.55	1
A Just Russia	5.44	1
Yabloko	1.18	0
Registered voters/turnout	49.08	

=== 2021 ===
Party	%	Seats
United Russia	57.91	42
Communist Party of the Russian Federation	15.63	3
Rodina	12.68	3
A Just Russia — For Truth	6.59	1
Liberal Democratic Party of Russia	5.27	1
Registered voters/turnout	58.60	

== List of chairmen ==
Name	Took office	Left office
Aleksandr Ryabov	1994	1995
Vladimir Karev	1996	2011
Aleksandr Nikitin	2011	2015
Vladimir Karev	2015	2016
Yevgeny Matushkin	2016	—
