= Tambov Oblast =

First-level administrative division of Russia

Tambov Oblast Тамбовская область (Russian)
- Oblast
- Flag Coat of arms
- Anthem: "Farewell of Slavianka"
- Coordinates: 52°43′12″N 41°27′11″E
- Country: Russia
- Federal district: Central
- Economic region: Central Black Earth
- Established: September 27, 1937
- Administrative center: Tambov

Government
  - Body: Oblast Duma
  - Head: Yevgeny Pervyshov

Area
  - Total: 34,462 km^{2} (13,306 sq mi)
  - Rank: 63rd

Population (2021 census)
  - Total: 982,991
  - Estimate (2018): 1,033,552
  - Rank: 52nd
  - Density: 28.524/km^{2} (73.877/sq mi)
  - Urban: 58.7%
  - Rural: 41.3%

GDP (nominal, 2024)
  - Total: ₽580 billion (US$6.81 billion)
  - Per capita: ₽609,973 (US$7,157.54)
- Time zone: UTC+3 (MSK)
- ISO 3166 code: RU-TAM
- License plates: 68
- OKTMO ID: 68000000
- Official languages: Russian
- Website: www.tambov.gov.ru

Tambov Oblast (Note: Russian: Тамбовская область, IPA: [tɐmˈbofskəjə ˈobɫəsʲtʲ]) is a federal subject of Russia (an oblast). Its administrative center is the city of Tambov. As of the 2010 Census, its population was 1,091,994.

== Geography ==
Tambov Oblast is situated in a forest steppe. It borders the Ryazan, Penza, Saratov, Voronezh and Lipetsk oblasts.

== History ==
The oldest known population of the Tambov region, the Mordovians-Moksha, formed as a nation of local ethnic groups from the 6th century BC. The first Russian settlers arrived in the pre-Mongol period, but the final settlement occurred in the 17th century. To protect the southern borders of Russia from the raids of the Tatars, and to further develop the Black Soil region, the Russian government built the walled cities of Kozlov (1635) and Tambov (1636). The cities protected the main path of nomad raids on Russian land and paved the way for a quick settlement of the region.

Kozlovsky Uyezd originally existed in the Tambov area. In the course of the administrative reforms of Peter the Great in 1708 and 1719, it became part of Azov Governorate. New administrative divisions established the Tambov Viceroyalty in 1779 and from 1796 Tambov Governorate, with an area of 66.5 thousand km^{2} divided into 12 uyezds. With almost no change to its boundaries, the Governorate remained in existence until 1928.

An attempt to establish Soviet control over the Tambov area led to the defeat and execution of "Red Sonya" (Sofia Nukhimovna Gel'berg) in the spring of 1918.

During the Russian Civil War, an anti-Bolshevik uprising, the Tambov Rebellion, broke out in Tambov Governorate in 1920–1921.

Tambov Oblast was finally created from the Voronezh and Samara Oblasts on September 27, 1937. The oblast attained its present form after the separation of Penza Oblast (formerly part of Kuybyshev before joining Tambov) on February 4, 1939.

== Politics ==
The acting head of the administration of the Tambov Oblast since 4 October 2021 and Head of the Tambov Oblast since 20 September 2022 is Maxim Yegorov.

Elections to the Regional Duma were held from 17 to 19 September 2021. 25 seats were distributed by party lists and 25 by single-member constituencies. The seats at the end of the elections were distributed as follows:

- United Russia — 42
- Rodina — 3
- Communist Party of the Russian Federation — 3
- Liberal Democratic Party of Russia — 1
- A Just Russia — 1

== Demographics ==
Historical population
Year	Pop.	±%
1897	2,684,030	—
1926	2,726,914	+1.6%
1959	1,549,001	−43.2%
1970	1,511,938	−2.4%
1979	1,390,048	−8.1%
1989	1,320,763	−5.0%
2002	1,178,443	−10.8%
2010	1,091,994	−7.3%
2021	982,991	−10.0%
2025	946,010	−3.8%
Source: Census data, estimate

Population: 982,991 (2021 census); 1,091,994 (2010 census); 1,178,443 (2002 census); 1,320,763 (1989 Soviet census).

Vital statistics for 2024:

- Births: 5,854 (6.2 per 1,000)
- Deaths: 15,095 (15.9 per 1,000)

Total fertility rate (2024):
1.16 children per woman

Life expectancy (2021):
Total — 69.88 years (male — 65.41, female — 74.33)

Ethnic composition (2010)

- Russians: 97%
- Ukrainians: 0.7%
- Armenians: 0.4%
- Romani people: 0.4%
- Others: 1.5%
- 22,708 people were registered from administrative databases, and could not declare an ethnicity. It is estimated that the proportion of ethnicities in this group is the same as that of the declared group.

=== Settlements ===
Largest cities or towns in Tambov Oblast 2010 Russian Census
Rank		Administrative Division	Pop.
1	Tambov	Tambovsky District	280,161
2	Michurinsk	Michurinsky District	98,758
3	Rasskazovo	Rasskazovsky District	45,484
4	Morshansk	Morshansky District	41,556
5	Kotovsk	Town of oblast significance of Kotovsk	31,850
6	Uvarovo	Uvarovsky District	26,830
7	Stroitel	Tambovsky District	18,437
8	Kirsanov	Kirsanovsky District	17,224
9	Zherdevka	Zherdevsky District	15,209
10	Pervomaysky	Pervomaysky District	12,654

=== Religion ===
Religion in Tambov Oblast as of 2012 (Sreda Arena Atlas)
Russian Orthodoxy	78.4%
Other Christians	1%
Spiritual but not religious	6.7%
Atheism and irreligion	10%
Other and undeclared	3.9%

According to a 2012 survey, 78.4% of the population of Tambov Oblast adheres to the Russian Orthodox Church, making it the federal subject with the highest percentage of this religion in the whole country. In addition, 1% are unaffiliated generic Christians, 7% of the population declares to be "spiritual but not religious", 10% is atheist, and 3.6% follows other religions or did not give an answer to the question.

== Economy ==
Southeastern Railway passes through Michurinsk and connects the central regions with the southern regions. Breeding cattle, sheep, pig, and chicken is a product of animal husbandry.

== See also ==
- List of Chairmen of the Tambov Oblast Duma
