= 2025 Nenets Autonomous Okrug gubernatorial election =

← 2020	14 September 2025	2030 →
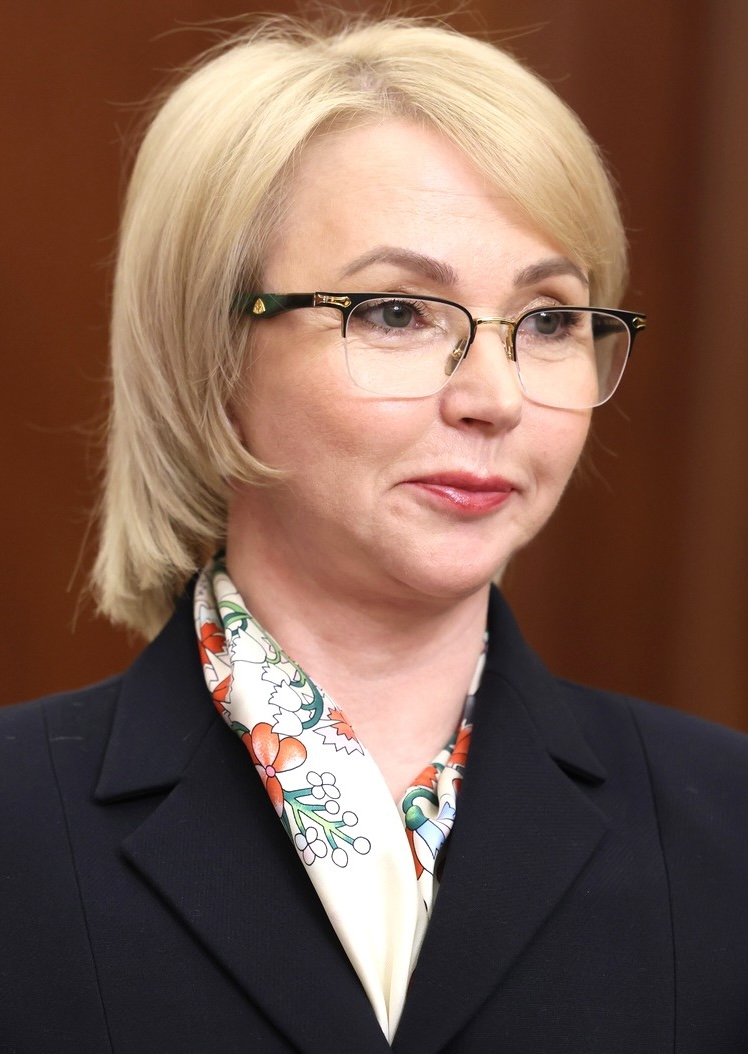

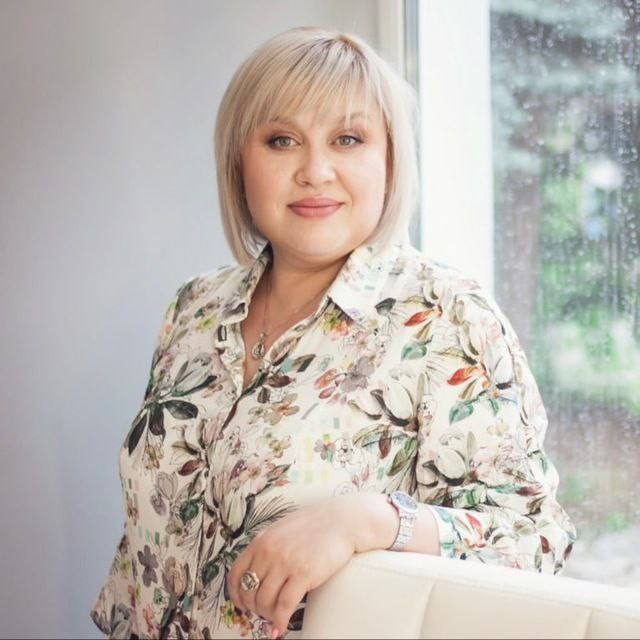
		CPRF
Candidate	Irina Gecht	Mikhail Rayn	Tatyana Antipina
Party	United Russia	CPRF	SR–ZP
Electoral vote	16	3	0
Percentage	84.21%	15.79%	0.00%
Governor before election
Irina Gecht (acting)
United Russia
Governor-elect
Irina Gecht
United Russia

The 2025 Nenets Autonomous Okrug gubernatorial election took place on 14 September 2025, on common election day, coinciding with 2025 Arkhangelsk Oblast gubernatorial election. Acting Governor of Nenets Autonomous Okrug Irina Gecht was elected for a full term in office. Governor of Nenets Autonomous Okrug is elected by the Assembly of Deputies of the Nenets Autonomous Okrug and this was the only indirect gubernatorial election in Russia in 2025.

== Background ==
In April 2020 then-Governor of Nenets Autonomous Okrug Alexander Tsybulsky was appointed acting Governor of Arkhangelsk Oblast, simultaneously his deputy Yury Bezdudny was appointed acting Governor of Nenets Autonomous Okrug. Later, in mid-May 2020 Tsybulsky and Bezdudny signed a joint memorandum of understanding on unifying Arkhangelsk Oblast and Nenets Autonomous Okrug: since Russian Constitution was adopted in 1993 Nenets Autonomous Okrug was a separate federal subject and, at the same time, a part of Arkhangelsk Oblast, however, a potential unification would abolish autonomous okrug completely. The proposed unification sparked a massive outrage in the Nenets Autonomous Okrug, one of the largest oil and gas producing regions of Russia, which was far more wealthier than the rest of Arkhangelsk Oblast, and protests were held in the okrug capital of Naryan-Mar. Overwhelming negative reaction to the unification resulted in the suspension of the memorandum in late May 2020. In July 2020 Nenets Autonomous Okrug became an only region in Russia, where the majority of population voted against amendments to the Constitution of Russia, after which acting Governor Bezdudny publicly renounced the unification with Arkhangelsk Oblast.

Yury Bezdudny suffered a massive blow to his popularity due to the proposed unification, however, the indirect gubernatorial election system completely prevented the acting governor from defeat. In September 2020 Bezdudny was successfully elected to the full term by the Assembly of Deputies of the Nenets Autonomous Okrug, winning 14 votes out of 16 total. Meanwhile, Alexander Tsybulsky lost Nenets Autonomous Okrug in the concurrent Arkhangelsk Oblast gubernatorial election to former State Duma member and A Just Russia nominee Irina Chirkova, who gathered 62.21% in okrug (Tsybulsky won the overall election with 69.63%). Nenets Autonomous Okrug continued its oppositional streak as in the 2021 Russian legislative election CPRF placed first in the region in the party-list voting with 31.98% of the vote. However, in the 2023 Assembly of Deputies election United Russia retained and expanded its majority, winning 43.94% and 13 mandates (out of 19).

On March 18, 2025, Governor Yury Bezdudny announced his intent to resign from the office. Later that day President of Russia Vladimir Putin met with former Prime Minister of Zaporozhye Oblast Irina Gecht and asked her to become acting Governor of Nenets Autonomous Okrug, which she accepted.

== Candidates ==
Governor of Nenets Autonomous Okrug is elected indirectly, by the Assembly of Deputies of the Nenets Autonomous Okrug, for the term of five years. Candidate for Governor of Nenets Autonomous Okrug should be a Russian citizen and at least 30 years old. Candidates for Governor of Nenets Autonomous Okrug should not have a foreign citizenship or residence permit. Candidates for Governor of Nenets Autonomous Okrug are nominated by political parties, which have factions either in the Assembly of Deputies of the Nenets Autonomous Okrug or in the State Duma, and the parties can nominate up to three candidates each. Governor of Arkhangelsk Oblast then selects five nominated candidates and sends them to the President of Russia, who selects three of them and submits to the Assembly of Deputies of the Nenets Autonomous Okrug. The Assembly of Deputies elects Governor of Nenets Autonomous Okrug with a simple majority. Also gubernatorial candidates present 3 candidacies to the Federation Council and election winner later appoints one of the presented candidates.

=== Declared ===
Candidate name, political party	Occupation	Status	Ref.
Tatyana Antipina; SR–ZP	Member of Council of Zapolyarny District (2024–present); Individual entrepreneur	Submitted by the President	
Irina Gecht; United Russia	Acting Governor of Nenets Autonomous Okrug (2025–present); Former Chairwoman of the Government of Zaporozhye Oblast (2024–2025)	Submitted by the President	
Mikhail Rayn; Communist Party	Member of Assembly of Deputies of the Nenets Autonomous Okrug (2018–present); Aide to State Duma member Yury Sinelshchikov; 2020 gubernatorial candidate	Submitted by the President	
Lyudmila Prilutskaya; United Russia	Chairwoman of the Council of Zapolyarny District (2024–present)	Did not advance	
Igor Sokolov; United Russia	Chairman of the Council of Naryan-Mar (2024–present)	Did not advance	

=== Candidates for Federation Council ===
Head candidate, political party	Candidates for Federation Council	Status
Tatyana Antipina; SR–ZP	* Aleksandr Gayevoy, housing utilities executive * Yury Markov, individual entrepreneur * Irina Tereshchenko, pensioner	Registered
Irina Gecht; United Russia	* Denis Gusev, incumbent Senator (2020–present) * Natalya Latysheva, Nes house of culture director * Viktor Vodolatsky, Member of State Duma (2007–2011, 2012–present)	Registered
Mikhail Rayn; Communist Party	* Kirill Anufriyev, Member of Zapolyarny District Council (2024–present) * Mikhail Kushnir, Member of Assembly of Deputies of the Nenets Autonomous Okrug (2023–present) * Aleksandr Kanev, former Member of Kotkinsky Rural Council of Deputies (2017–2022)	Registered

== Results ==
Summary of the 14 September 2025 Nenets Autonomous Okrug gubernatorial election results
Candidate	Party	Votes	%
Irina Gecht (incumbent)	United Russia	16	84.21
Mikhail Rayn	Communist Party	3	15.79
Tatyana Antipina	A Just Russia – For Truth	0	0.00
Valid votes		19	100.00
Blank ballots		0	0.00
Total		19	100.00
Turnout		19	100.00
Registered voters		19	100.00

Governor Gecht re-appointed incumbent Senator Denis Gusev (United Russia) to the Federation Council.

== See also ==
- 2025 Russian regional elections
