= 2025 Arkhangelsk Oblast gubernatorial election =

- 12–14 September 2025
- Turnout: 36.27% ▲3.67 pp
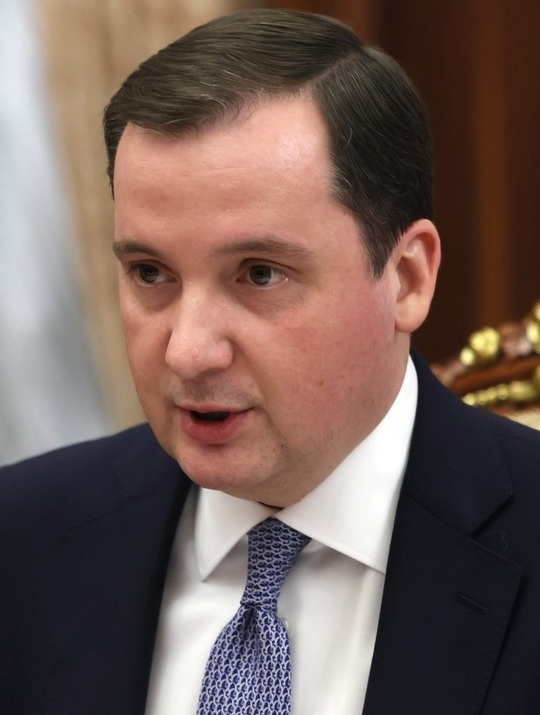

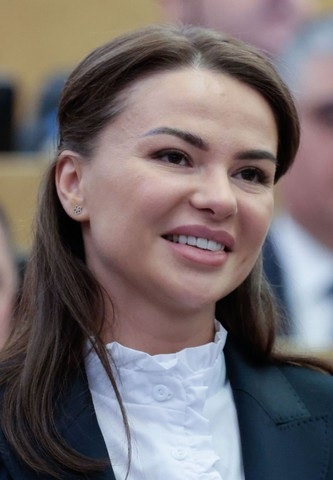
			SR–ZP
Candidate	Alexander Tsybulsky	Maria Kharchenko	Oleg Chernenko
Party	United Russia	LDPR	SR–ZP
Popular vote	216,380	34,025	26,029
Percentage	67.32%	10.59%	8.10%
- Results by raions and cities
Governor before election
Alexander Tsybulsky
United Russia
Governor-elect
Alexander Tsybulsky
United Russia

The 2025 Arkhangelsk Oblast gubernatorial election took place on 12–14 September 2025, on common election day. Incumbent Governor of Arkhangelsk Oblast Alexander Tsybulsky was re-elected a second term in office.

== Background ==
Then-Governor of Nenets Autonomous Okrug Alexander Tsybulsky was appointed acting Governor of Arkhangelsk Oblast in April 2020, replacing two-term incumbent Igor Orlov. Orlov resigned over poor management skills, low ratings and 2018–2020 Shies ecological protests. In May 2020 Tsybulsky and Governor of Nenets Autonomous Okrug Yury Bezdudny signed a memorandum on Arkhangelsk Oblast and Nenets Autonomous Okrug unification, which sparked protests in Nenets Autonomous Okrug and decreasing popularity of both Tsybulsky and Bezdudny. Tsybulsky won the general election with 69.63% of the vote, notably Tsybulsky lost the vote in Nenets Autonomous Okrug to former State Duma member Irina Chirkova (SR–ZP), who won 62% of the vote there.

In March 2025 during a meeting with President Vladimir Putin Governor Tsybulsky announced his intention to run for a second term and received Putin's endorsement.

== Candidates ==
In Arkhangelsk Oblast candidates for Governor of Arkhangelsk Oblast can be nominated only by registered political parties. Candidate for Governor of Arkhangelsk Oblast should be a Russian citizen and at least 30 years old. Candidates for Governor of Arkhangelsk Oblast should not have a foreign citizenship or residence permit. Each candidate in order to be registered is required to collect at least 8% of signatures of members and heads of municipalities. Also gubernatorial candidates present 3 candidacies to the Federation Council and election winner later appoints one of the presented candidates.

=== Declared ===
Candidate name, political party		Occupation	Status	Ref.
Aleksey Buglak; Party of Pensioners		Teaching methodologist	Registered	
Oleg Chernenko; SR–ZP		Member of Arkhangelsk Oblast Assembly of Deputies (2011–2013, 2021–present); Businessman; Husband of former State Duma member Irina Chirkova	Registered	
Maria Kharchenko; Liberal Democratic Party	Maria Kharchenko	Member of Arkhangelsk City Duma (2013–present)	Registered	
Roman Lyabikhov; Communist Party	Roman Lyabikhov	Member of State Duma (2020–present)	Registered	
Natalya Sorokina; Green Alternative		Nonprofit executive	Registered	
Alexander Tsybulsky; United Russia	Alexander Tsybulsky	Incumbent Governor of Arkhangelsk Oblast (2020–present)	Registered	
Larisa Medvedeva; The Greens		Cosmetics professional	Did not file	

=== Declined ===
- Aleksandr Grevtsov (CPRF), Member of Arkhangelsk Oblast Assembly of Deputies (2023–present)

=== Candidates for Federation Council ===
Head candidate, political party	Candidates for Federation Council	Status
Maria Kharchenko; Liberal Democratic Party	* Kirill Aleskerov, Member of Novodvinsk Council of Deputies (2013–present), businessman * Georgy Gubanov, Member of Arkhangelsk Oblast Assembly of Deputies (2018–present) * Lyudmila Taybarey, Member of Council of Zapolyarny District (2024–present), aide to State Duma member Yaroslav Nilov	Registered
Aleksandr Tsybulsky; United Russia	* Aleksey Alsufyev, First Deputy Governor of Arkhangelsk Oblast – Chairman of the Government of Arkhangelsk Oblast (2015–present) * Yury Borisov, incumbent Senator (2025–present) * Yekaterina Prokopyeva, Chairwoman of the Arkhangelsk Oblast Assembly of Deputies (2018–present)	Registered

== Finances ==
All sums are in rubles.

Financial Report	Source	Buglak	Chernenko	Kharchenko	Lyabikhov	Medvedeva	Sorokina	Tsybulsky
First		20,180,000	3,181,100	180,000	180,000	0	180,000	20,750,000
Final		35,180,000	12,040,380	2,330,000	1,980,000	0	40,180,000	55,750,000

== Polls ==
Fieldwork date	Polling firm	Tsybulsky	Kharchenko	Chernenko	Lyabikhov	Sorokina	Buglak	Lead
14 September 2025	2025 election	67.3	10.6	8.1	4.8	3.9	3.9	56.7
9–22 August 2025	FOM	69.6	9.5	8.6	4.5	3.1	3.6	60.1

== Results ==
Summary of the 12–14 September 2025 Arkhangelsk Oblast gubernatorial election results
Candidate	Party	Votes	%
Aleksandr Tsybulsky (incumbent)	United Russia	216,380	67.32
Maria Kharchenko	Liberal Democratic Party	34,025	10.59
Oleg Chernenko	A Just Russia – For Truth	26,029	8.10
Roman Lyabikhov	Communist Party	15,304	4.76
Natalya Sorokina	Green Alternative	12,655	3.94
Aleksey Buglak	Party of Pensioners	12,363	3.85
Valid votes		316,756	98.55
Blank ballots		4,675	1.45
Total		321,431	100.00
Turnout		321,431	36.27
Registered voters		886,148	100.00

Governor Tsybulsky re-appointed incumbent Senator Yury Borisov (Independent) to the Federation Council.

== See also ==
- 2025 Russian regional elections
