= 2004–05 Russian gubernatorial elections =

- 14 March 2004 – 6 February 2005

25 Heads of Federal Subjects from 89
- 2004 Russian regional elections: Gubernatorial Legislative Gubernatorial and legislative Gubernatorial and legislative (both of another subject)

Gubernatorial elections in 2004 and 2005 were held in 25 federal subjects of Russia. In several regions these elections were moved from end of 2004 to March 14 to combine with the 2004 Russian presidential election.

On 12 December 2004, at the initiative of Russian President Vladimir Putin, gubernatorial elections were abolished throughout the country. These were the last gubernatorial elections in Russia until September 2012.

== Race summary ==
Federal subject	Incumbent	Incumbent since	Election day	Candidates	Result
Udmurtia (snap election)	Alexander Volkov	2000	14 March	✓ Alexander Volkov (UR) 54.26%; Yevgeny Odiyankov 18.89%; Against all 14.97%	Incumbent re-elected.
Altai Krai	Aleksandr Surikov	1996	14 March (first round)	Aleksandr Surikov (backed by UR, CPRF) 47.46%; Mikhail Yevdokimov 39.46%	Incumbent lost re-election. New governor elected.
Altai Krai	Aleksandr Surikov	1996	4 April (runoff)	✓ Mikhail Yevdokimov 49.53%; Aleksandr Surikov (UR) 46.29%	Incumbent lost re-election. New governor elected.
Krasnodar Krai (snap election)	Alexander Tkachov	2000	14 March	✓ Alexander Tkachov (UR, CPRF, APR support) 83.98%; Against all 7.62%	Incumbent re-elected.
Arkhangelsk Oblast (snap election)	Anatoly Yefremov	1996	14 March (first round)	Nikolay Kiselyov 44.99%; Anatoly Yefremov (UR) 26.47%; Against all 14.80%	Incumbent lost re-election. New governor elected.
Arkhangelsk Oblast (snap election)	Anatoly Yefremov	1996	28 March (runoff)	✓ Nikolay Kiselyov 75.04%; Anatoly Yefremov (UR) 17.54%; Against all 6.86%	Incumbent lost re-election. New governor elected.
Chita Oblast (snap election)	Ravil Geniatulin	1996	14 March	✓ Ravil Geniatulin (backed by UR, CPRF) 68.18%; Oleg Yesaulov 14.17%; Viktor Shchursky 6.67%; Against all 9.53%	Incumbent re-elected.
Kaluga Oblast (snap election)	Anatoly Artamonov	2000	14 March	✓ Anatoly Artamonov 66.86%; Aleksandr Safronov 9.13%; Against all 12.83%	Incumbent re-elected.
Murmansk Oblast	Yury Yevdokimov	1996	14 March	✓ Yury Yevdokimov (supported by UR) 76.99%; Against all 10.57%	Incumbent re-elected.
Ryazan Oblast (snap election)	Vyacheslav Lyubimov	1996	14 March (first round)	Igor Morozov (UR) 28.94%; Georgy Shpak (Rodina) 23.79%; Vyacheslav Lyubimov (CPRF) 21.08%; Pavel Mamatov 10.66%; Viktor Milekhin 5.55%; Against all 6.14%	Incumbent lost re-election. New governor elected.
Ryazan Oblast (snap election)	Vyacheslav Lyubimov	1996	28 March (runoff)	✓ Georgy Shpak 53.51%; Igor Morozov 40.32%; Against all 5.31%	Incumbent lost re-election. New governor elected.
Voronezh Oblast (snap election)	Vladimir Kulakov	2000	14 March	✓ Vladimir Kulakov (supported by UR) 52.49%; Sergey Rudakov (CPRF) 20.13%; Galina Kudryavtseva 14.55%; Against all 7.65%	Incumbent re-elected.
Koryak AO (snap election)	Vladimir Loginov	2000	14 March (first round)	Vladimir Loginov (backed by UR) 37.43%; Boris Chuyev 17.92%; Andrey Petrov (UR dissident) 16.75%; Baurzhan Belbayev 10.65%; Nina Solodyakova 7.35%; Against all 6.24%	Incumbent re-elected.
Koryak AO (snap election)	Vladimir Loginov	2000	4 April (runoff)	✓ Vladimir Loginov 50.88%; Boris Chuyev 39.29%; Against all 7.16%	Incumbent re-elected.
Chechnya (snap election)	Akhmad Kadyrov (died in office); Sergey Abramov (acting)	2003	29 August	✓ Alu Alkhanov (UR) 73.67%; Movsur Khamidov 8.95%	New president elected to a vacant position.
Pskov Oblast	Yevgeny Mikhailov	1996	14 November (first round)	Yevgeny Mikhailov (UR) 29.71%; Mikhail Kuznetsov 18.34%; Mikhail Bryachak (RPZh) 8.78%; Igor Provkin 8.29%; Aleksey Mitrofanov (LDPR) 8.24%; Against all 17.43%	Incumbent lost re-election. New governor elected.
Pskov Oblast	Yevgeny Mikhailov	1996	5 December (runoff)	✓ Mikhail Kuznetsov 48.83%; Yevgeny Mikhailov (UR) 41.40%; Against all 8.98%	Incumbent lost re-election. New governor elected.
Ust-Orda Buryat AO	Valery Maleyev	1996	14 November	✓ Valery Maleyev (UR) 55.83%; Pyotr Khakhalov 37.41%	Incumbent re-elected.
Kurgan Oblast	Oleg Bogomolov	1996	28 November (first round)	Oleg Bogomolov (UR) 35.08%; Yevgeny Sobakin (SPS) 23.78%; Pyotr Nazarov (UR dissident) 23.61%; Against all 10.46%	Incumbent re-elected.
Kurgan Oblast	Oleg Bogomolov	1996	19 December (runoff)	✓ Oleg Bogomolov (UR) 49.15%; Yevgeny Sobakin (SPS) 40.13%; Against all 9.51%	Incumbent re-elected.
Astrakhan Oblast	Anatoly Guzhvin (died in office); Aleksandr Glazkov (acting)	1991	5 December	✓ Alexander Zhilkin (UR) 65.34%; Igor Negerev (CPRF) 14.31%; Against all 8.31%	New governor elected to a vacant position.
Bryansk Oblast	Yury Lodkin	1996	5 December (first round)	Nikolay Denin (UR) 44.75%; Yevgeny Zelenko (SPS) 12.53%; Nikolay Rudenok (SDPR) 6.31%; Georgy Abushenko (RPZh) 5.87%; Against all 20.57%	Incumbent disqualified. New governor elected.
Bryansk Oblast	Yury Lodkin	1996	19 December (runoff)	✓ Nikolay Denin (UR) 77.83%; Yevgeny Zelenko (SPS) 10.32%; Against all 10.62%	Incumbent disqualified. New governor elected.
Kamchatka Oblast	Mikhail Mashkovtsev	2000	5 December (first round)	Mikhail Mashkovtsev (CPRF) 38.37%; Boris Nevzorov 23.66%; Oleg Kozhemyako 14.27%; Aleksandr Dudnikov (UR) 10.44%; Against all 7.41%	Incumbent re-elected.
Kamchatka Oblast	Mikhail Mashkovtsev	2000	19 December (runoff)	✓ Mikhail Mashkovtsev (CPRF) 49.58%; Boris Nevzorov 37.66%; Against all 12.12%	Incumbent re-elected.
Ulyanovsk Oblast	Vladimir Shamanov (resigned); Maria Bolshakova (acting)	2000	5 December (first round)	Sergey Morozov (backed by UR) 27.75%; Sergey Gerasimov (SPS) 20.87%; Margarita Barzhanova (UR dissident) 14.63%; Mikhail Shkanov 9.69%; Yury Goryachev 8.51%; Against all 11.05%	Incumbent resigned from office. New governor elected.
Ulyanovsk Oblast	Vladimir Shamanov (resigned); Maria Bolshakova (acting)	2000	26 December (runoff)	✓ Sergey Morozov 52.81%; Margarita Barzhanova (Note: Replacing Sergey Gerasimov, who was removed from ballot by a court decision.) 20.61%; Against all 25.16%	Incumbent resigned from office. New governor elected.
Volgograd Oblast	Nikolay Maksyuta	1996	5 December (first round)	Nikolay Maksyuta (CPRF) 41.42%; Nikolay Volkov (SPS) 13.18%; Oleg Savchenko (UR dissident) 12.93%; Yevgeny Golubyatnikov (LDPR) 7.22%; Vladimir Goryunov (backed by UR) 7.08%; Against all 12.98%	Incumbent re-elected.
Volgograd Oblast	Nikolay Maksyuta	1996	26 December (runoff)	✓ Nikolay Maksyuta (CPRF) 51.13%; Nikolay Volkov (SPS) 38.63%; Against all 9.14%	Incumbent re-elected.
Mari El	Leonid Markelov	2000	19 December	✓ Leonid Markelov (backed by UR, APR, LDPR, RPZh) 56.96%; Mikhail Dolgov 18.69%; Aleksandr Korotkov 10.53%; Against all 9.94%	Incumbent re-elected.
Khabarovsk Krai	Viktor Ishayev	1991	19 December	✓ Viktor Ishayev 85.34%; Against all 5.69%	Incumbent re-elected.
Khakassia	Aleksey Lebed	1996	26 December	✓ Aleksey Lebed (backed by UR, PVR, Free Russia) 59.15%; Vladimir Kerzhentsev (CPRF) 11.97%; Sergey Yerbyagin 8.55%; Against all 10.85%	Incumbent re-elected.
↑ 2004 · 2005 ↓
Nenets AO	Vladimir Butov	1996	23 January (first round)	Alexey Barinov 22.41%; Igor Koshin (UR dissident) 20.69%; Leonid Sablin (CPRF) 18.06%; Aleksandr Shmakov (UR support) 16.22%; Against all 8.04%	Incumbent term-limited. New governor elected.
Nenets AO	Vladimir Butov	1996	6 February (runoff)	✓ Alexey Barinov (Rodina support) 48.45%; Igor Koshin 30.47%; Against all 20.21%	Incumbent term-limited. New governor elected.

== Bryansk Oblast ==
Governor of Bryansk Oblast Yury Lodkin was going on his third term in 2004 (fourth if 1993–96 tenure as Head of Administration counted), but was removed from registration "for abuse of office". The application to the regional court was submitted by the candidate from the People's Party Alexander Zhdanov. Lodkin, considered one of the favorites of the campaign, linked his removing from ballot with his Communist Party membership. He accused the United Russia party of “unwillingness to win legally”.

== Samara Oblast ==
The elections were set up by the regional court on 19 September 2004, after the court recognized that the 5-year term limit, introduced into the Samara Oblast Charter during the 2000 elections, can come into force only after next elections and that Konstantin Titov's term expired on July 2. However, the elections were later canceled by the Supreme Court at the suit of the Central Election Commission.

== Nenets Autonomous Okrug ==
2005 Nenets gubernatorial election
- January 23, 2005 (first round); February 6, 2005 (runoff)

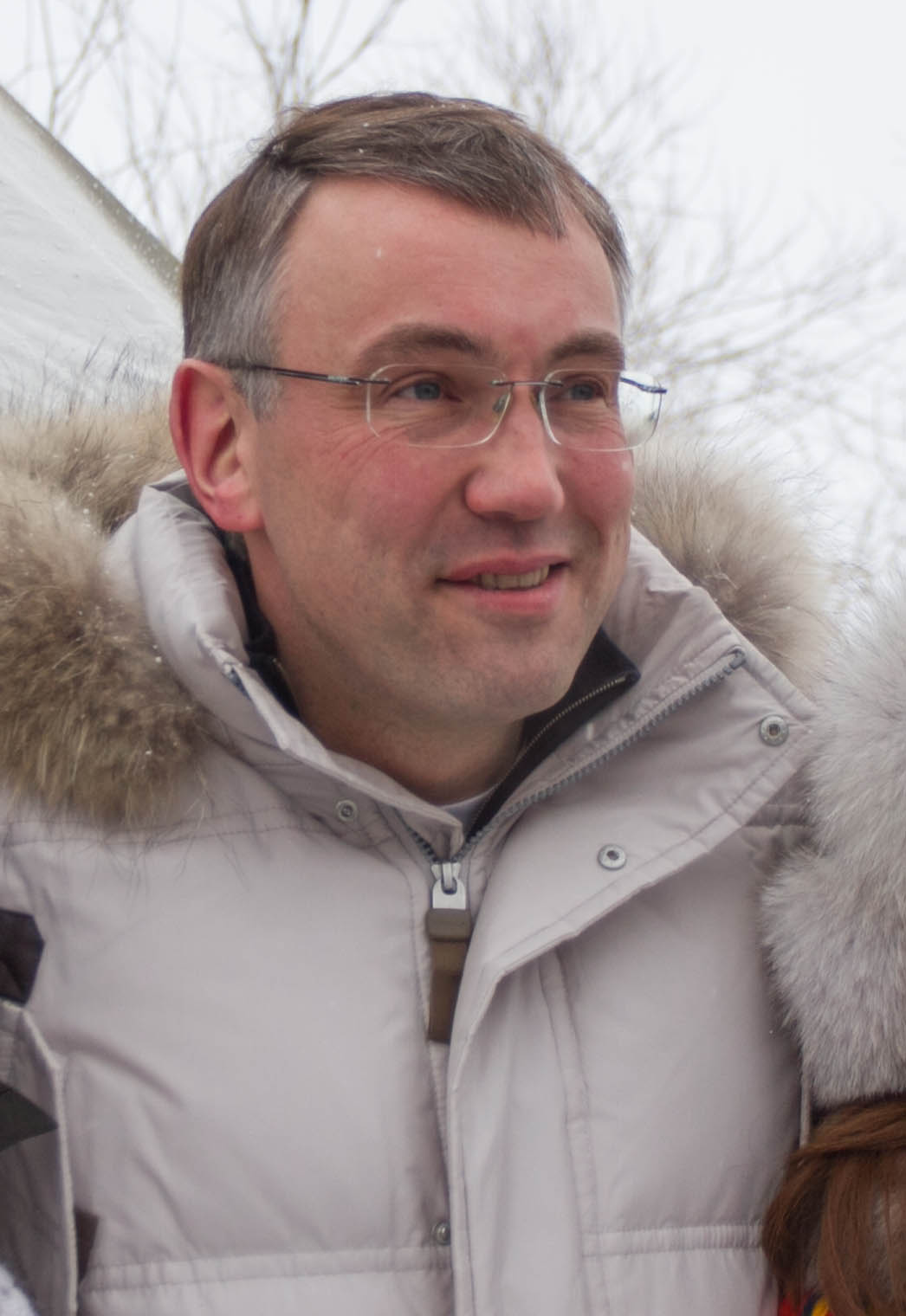
Candidate	Alexey Barinov	Igor Koshin
Popular vote	9,005	5,663
Percentage	48.45%	30.47%
Governor before election
Vladimir Butov
Independent
Elected Governor
Alexey Barinov
Independent

Gubernatorial elections in the Nenets Autonomous Okrug were held on 23 January 2005, the second round was held on February 6. Incumbent governor Vladimir Butov, in office from 1996, could not be nominated due to the two-term limit (the Supreme Court of Russia overturned regional act passed shortly before the elections that allowed Butov to run for a third term). In addition he was convicted for beating a traffic police officer.

Candidates included:

- Alexey Barinov, President of a charitable foundation, former chief federal inspector for Nenets AO, ex-employee of LUKoil
- Viktoria Bobrova, assistant of Nenets AO Regional Prosecutor
- Vladimir Butov, relative and namesake of incumbent governor
- Igor Koshin, member of Nenets AO legislature; former secretary of the political council of United Russia's regional branch, expelled from the party after self-nominating for governorship
- Leonid Sablin, member of Nenets AO legislature, chairman of regional executive committee (1985–90)
- Aleksandr Shmakov, entrepreneur, 2001 gubernatorial candidate

=== Results ===
Candidate	Party	First round		Second round	
Candidate	Party	Votes	%	Votes	%
Alexey Barinov	Independent	4,362	22.74	9,005	48.87
Igor Koshin	Independent	4,028	20.99	5,663	30.74
Leonid Sablin	Communist Party	3,515	18.32		
Aleksandr Shmakov	United Russia	3,157	16.45		
Vladimir Butov		1,091	5.69		
Alexander Bebenin		593	3.09		
Viktoria Bobrova		497	2.59		
Leonid Bogachuk		88	0.46		
Nikolay Kalchishkov		72	0.38		
Vladimir Kislyakov		66	0.34		
Stanislav Bestuzhev		63	0.33		
Nikolay Kirikov		24	0.13		
Alexander Kolesnikov		24	0.13		
Mikhail Nikitsin		23	0.12		
Nikolay Yablokov		17	0.09		
Against all		1,566	8.16	3,757	20.39
Total		19,186	100.00	18,425	100.00
Valid votes		19,186	98.55	18,425	99.12
Invalid/blank votes		282	1.45	163	0.88
Total votes		19,468	100.00	18,588	100.00
Registered voters/turnout		30,939	62.92	30,933	60.09
Source: Election Commission of Nenets Autonomous Okrug

=== Aftermath ===
On 18 February 2005, Alexey Barinov officially took office. In May 2006 he was arrested on charges of committing fraud. On June 2 of the same year, President Vladimir Putin removed Barinov from the governorship and appointed the chief federal inspector for the region, Valery Potapenko as the interim governor of NAO. Later, in 2007, Barinov was acquitted.

== Sources ==
- Ivanov, Vitaly (2020). Глава субъекта Российской Федерации. История губернаторов. Том I. История. Книга II [Head of the subject of the Russian Federation. History of governors. Volume I: History. Book II] (in Russian). pp. 250–252.
