= 2025 Russian elections =

- 14 September 2025
- 2025 Russian regional elections: Gubernatorial Gubernatorial (of another subject) Gubernatorial and legislative Legislative

The 2025 Russian elections were held in Russia, in large part, on 14 September 2025, with several regions. There were 21 gubernatorial elections (20 direct and one indirectly elected), 11 regional parliamentary elections, and many elections on the municipal level.

In several regions, REV — Remote Electronic Voting was used via the federal platform vybory.gov.ru. To take part, voters were required to apply in advance through the Gosuslugi portal, within the official application window; online voting ran on the same dates, 12–14 September 2025. Paper voting remained available in parallel, and participation in REV was voluntary and limited to regions connected to the system

== Federal elections ==
=== State Duma by-elections ===
Nine State Duma constituencies that became vacant in late 2024 – early 2025 were initially scheduled to hold by-elections on September 14, 2025, however, in February 2025 a group of senators and deputies led by Andrey Klishas introduced a bill banning all by-elections to federal, regional and municipal legislatures during two years prior to the regular election (current law prevents holding by-elections only during the last year of the convocation). On May 20, 2025, State Duma adopted amendments to the electoral law, including the banning of by-elections two years prior to the regular election by a 327–54 vote. On May 21 Federation Council approved the amendments and on May 23 President Vladimir Putin signed the bill into law. Following the bill passage all 2025 State Duma by-elections were cancelled and the seats would remain vacant until 2026 Russian legislative election.

Constituency	Former MP	Party	Elected MP	Party
Biysk	Aleksandr Prokopyev until 25 June 2024	United Russia	By-election cancelled	
Skopin	Dmitry Khubezov until 8 October 2024	United Russia	By-election cancelled	
Krasnodar	Yevgeny Pervyshov until 4 November 2024	United Russia	By-election cancelled	
Samara	Alexander Khinshtein until 5 December 2024	United Russia	By-election cancelled	
Magadan	Anton Basansky until 4 March 2025	United Russia	By-election cancelled	
Prokopyevsk	Dmitry Islamov until 10 March 2025	United Russia	By-election cancelled	
Ufa	Pavel Kachkayev until 5 May 2025	United Russia	By-election cancelled	
Engels	Alexander Strelyukhin until 19 May 2025	United Russia	By-election cancelled	
Volzhsky	Oleg Savchenko until 20 May 2025	United Russia	By-election cancelled	

== Regional elections ==
=== Gubernatorial direct elections ===
Territories that are internationally recognised as part of Ukraine are highlighted with beige.

Region	Incumbent	Status	Last race	Result
Chuvashia	Oleg Nikolayev (IND)	Re-elected	2020: 75.61%	▌ ✓ Oleg Nikolayev (inc.) (Independent) 67.06%; ▌ Konstantin Stepanov (LDPR) 14.23%; ▌ Maksim Morozov (New People) 8.37%; ▌ Vladimir Ilyin (RPPSS) 5.56%; ▌ Vladimir Savinov (The Greens) 3.15%
Komi Republic	Vladimir Uyba (UR)	Resigned	2020: 73.18% (Note: elected as Independent candidate)	▌ ✓ Rostislav Goldstein (inc.) (UR) 70.04%; ▌ Tatyana Saladina (SR–ZP) 11.01%; ▌ Aleksandr Kasyanenko (CPCR) 8.60%; ▌ Sergey Karginov (LDPR) 5.36%; ▌ Stepan Solovyov (ZA!) 2.28%
Komi Republic	Rostislav Goldstein (UR)	Acting Head elected	–	▌ ✓ Rostislav Goldstein (inc.) (UR) 70.04%; ▌ Tatyana Saladina (SR–ZP) 11.01%; ▌ Aleksandr Kasyanenko (CPCR) 8.60%; ▌ Sergey Karginov (LDPR) 5.36%; ▌ Stepan Solovyov (ZA!) 2.28%
Tatarstan	Rustam Minnikhanov (UR)	Re-elected	2020: 83.27%	▌ ✓ Rustam Minnikhanov (inc.) (UR) 88.09%; ▌ Khafiz Mirgalimov (CPRF) 4.97%; ▌ Ruslan Yusupov (LDPR) 4.20%; ▌ Vitaly Smirnov (RPPSS) 1.90%
Kamchatka Krai	Vladimir Solodov (UR)	Re-elected	2020: 80.51%	▌ ✓ Vladimir Solodov (inc.) (UR) 62.97%; ▌ Vasilina Kuliyeva (LDPR) 13.82%; ▌ Roman Litvinov (CPRF) 13.30%; ▌ Dmitry Tyurin (CPCR) 5.13%
Krasnodar Krai	Veniamin Kondratyev (UR)	Re-elected	2020: 82.97%	▌ ✓ Veniamin Kondratyev (inc.) (UR) 83.17%; ▌ Aleksandr Safronov (CPRF) 8.56%; ▌ Ivan Tutushkin (LDPR) 4.51%; ▌ Denis Khmelevskoy (SR–ZP) 3.01%
Perm Krai	Dmitry Makhonin (UR)	Re-elected	2020: 75.69%	▌ ✓ Dmitry Makhonin (inc.) (UR) 70.94%; ▌ Ksenia Aytakova (CPRF) 10.30%; ▌ Oleg Postnikov (LDPR) 7.89%; ▌ Denis Shitov (New People) 5.87%; ▌ Lyudmila Karavayeva (RPPSS) 3.26%
Arkhangelsk Oblast	Aleksandr Tsybulsky (UR)	Re-elected	2020: 69.63%	▌ ✓ Alexander Tsybulsky (inc.) (UR) 67.32%; ▌ Maria Kharchenko (LDPR) 10.59%; ▌ Oleg Chernenko (SR–ZP) 8.10%; ▌ Roman Lyabikhov (CPRF) 4.76%; ▌ Natalya Sorokina (ZA!) 3.94%; ▌ Aleksey Buglak (RPPSS) 3.85%
Bryansk Oblast	Aleksandr Bogomaz (UR)	Re-elected	2020: 71.70%	▌ ✓ Alexander Bogomaz (inc.) (UR) 78.78%; ▌ Andrey Arkhitsky (CPRF) 10.72%; ▌ Aleksey Timoshkov (SR–ZP) 5.52%; ▌ Gennady Selebin (Rodina) 3.56%
Irkutsk Oblast	Igor Kobzev (UR)	Re-elected	2020: 60.79%	▌ ✓ Igor Kobzev (inc.) (UR) 60.79%; ▌ Sergey Levchenko (CPRF) 22.65%; ▌ Larisa Yegorova (SR–ZP) 8.08%; ▌ Viktor Galitskov (LDPR) 5.82%
Kaluga Oblast	Vladislav Shapsha (UR)	Re-elected	2020: 71.19%	▌ ✓ Vladislav Shapsha (inc.) (UR) 72.24%; ▌ Nadezhda Yefremova (SR–ZP) 8.97%; ▌ Nikolay Yashkin (CPRF) 6.52%; ▌ Stepan Oparyshev (LDPR) 4.76%; ▌ Ivan Rodin (RPPSS) 4.37%
Kostroma Oblast	Sergey Sitnikov (UR)	Re-elected	2020: 64.65%	▌ ✓ Sergey Sitnikov (inc.) (UR) 67.63%; ▌ Sergey Shpotin (CPRF) 11.05%; ▌ Nikolay Tsvil (SR–ZP) 6.57%; ▌ Yury Kudryavtsev (RPPSS) 6.32%; ▌ Yury Mindolin (LDPR) 6.15%
Kursk Oblast	Aleksey Smirnov (UR)	Resigned	2024: 65.28%	▌ ✓ Alexander Khinshtein (inc.) (UR) 86.92%; ▌ Aleksey Bobovnikov (CPRF) 5.09%; ▌ Aleksey Tomanov (LDPR) 4.07%; ▌ Gennady Bayev (SR–ZP) 2.60%
Kursk Oblast	Alexander Khinshtein (UR)	Acting Governor elected	–	▌ ✓ Alexander Khinshtein (inc.) (UR) 86.92%; ▌ Aleksey Bobovnikov (CPRF) 5.09%; ▌ Aleksey Tomanov (LDPR) 4.07%; ▌ Gennady Bayev (SR–ZP) 2.60%
Leningrad Oblast	Aleksandr Drozdenko (UR)	Re-elected	2020: 83.61%	▌ ✓ Aleksandr Drozdenko (inc.) (UR) 84.21%; ▌ Andrey Lebedev (LDPR) 6.69%; ▌ Igor Novikov (SR–ZP) 3.02%; ▌ Sergey Malinkovich (CPCR) 2.65%; ▌ Sergey Lisovsky (The Greens) 2.20%
Novgorod Oblast	Andrey Nikitin (UR)	Resigned	2022: 77.03%	▌ ✓ Aleksandr Dronov (inc.) (UR) 62.19%; ▌ Olga Yefimova (CPRF) 14.40%; ▌ Aleksey Chursinov (LDPR) 9.53%; ▌ Nikolay Shvabovich (SR–ZP) 6.04%; ▌ Nikolay Zakharov (RPPSS) 5.27%
Novgorod Oblast	Aleksandr Dronov (UR)	Acting Governor elected	–	▌ ✓ Aleksandr Dronov (inc.) (UR) 62.19%; ▌ Olga Yefimova (CPRF) 14.40%; ▌ Aleksey Chursinov (LDPR) 9.53%; ▌ Nikolay Shvabovich (SR–ZP) 6.04%; ▌ Nikolay Zakharov (RPPSS) 5.27%
Orenburg Oblast	Denis Pasler (UR)	Resigned	2024: 78.14%	▌ ✓ Yevgeny Solntsev (inc.) (UR) 83.85%; ▌ Denis Baturin (CPRF) 5.93%; ▌ Ramil Gafarov (CPCR) 3.29%; ▌ Oksana Nabatchikova (SR–ZP) 2.99%; ▌ Karina Salikhova (New People) 2.41%
Orenburg Oblast	Yevgeny Solntsev (UR)	Acting Governor elected	–	▌ ✓ Yevgeny Solntsev (inc.) (UR) 83.85%; ▌ Denis Baturin (CPRF) 5.93%; ▌ Ramil Gafarov (CPCR) 3.29%; ▌ Oksana Nabatchikova (SR–ZP) 2.99%; ▌ Karina Salikhova (New People) 2.41%
Rostov Oblast	Vasily Golubev (UR)	Resigned	2020: 65.53%	▌ ✓ Yury Slyusar (inc.) (UR) 81.25%; ▌ Yevgeny Bessonov (CPRF) 9.17%; ▌ Denis Frash (LDPR) 3.47%; ▌ Sergey Kosinov (SR–ZP) 2.88%; ▌ Yury Klimchenko (RPPSS) 2.55%
Rostov Oblast	Yury Slyusar (UR)	Acting Governor elected	–	▌ ✓ Yury Slyusar (inc.) (UR) 81.25%; ▌ Yevgeny Bessonov (CPRF) 9.17%; ▌ Denis Frash (LDPR) 3.47%; ▌ Sergey Kosinov (SR–ZP) 2.88%; ▌ Yury Klimchenko (RPPSS) 2.55%
Sverdlovsk Oblast	Yevgeny Kuyvashev (UR)	Resigned	2022: 65.78%	▌ ✓ Denis Pasler (inc.) (UR) 61.30%; ▌ Aleksandr Ivachyov (CPRF) 15.25%; ▌ Andrey Kuznetsov (SR–ZP) 12.66%; ▌ Aleksandr Kaptyug (LDPR) 6.09%; ▌ Rant Krayev (New People) 2.72%
Sverdlovsk Oblast	Denis Pasler (UR)	Acting Governor elected	–	▌ ✓ Denis Pasler (inc.) (UR) 61.30%; ▌ Aleksandr Ivachyov (CPRF) 15.25%; ▌ Andrey Kuznetsov (SR–ZP) 12.66%; ▌ Aleksandr Kaptyug (LDPR) 6.09%; ▌ Rant Krayev (New People) 2.72%
Tambov Oblast	Maksim Yegorov (UR)	Resigned	2022: 84.95%	▌ ✓ Yevgeny Pervyshov (inc.) (UR) 73.84%; ▌ Andrey Zhidkov (CPRF) 9.93%; ▌ Pavel Plotnikov (SR–ZP) 5.45%; ▌ Oleg Morozov (LDPR) 5.45%; ▌ Yelena Semiletova (New People) 4.03%
Tambov Oblast	Yevgeny Pervyshov (UR)	Acting Head elected	–	▌ ✓ Yevgeny Pervyshov (inc.) (UR) 73.84%; ▌ Andrey Zhidkov (CPRF) 9.93%; ▌ Pavel Plotnikov (SR–ZP) 5.45%; ▌ Oleg Morozov (LDPR) 5.45%; ▌ Yelena Semiletova (New People) 4.03%
Sevastopol	Mikhail Razvozhayev (UR)	Re-elected	2020: 85.72%	▌ ✓ Mikhail Razvozhayev (inc.) (UR) 81.73%; ▌ Ilya Zhuravlyov (LDPR) 5.75%; ▌ Irina Salina (New People) 3.54%; ▌ Gennady Kushnir (CPRF) 3.90%; ▌ Sergey Kruglov (SR–ZP) 3.29%
Jewish Autonomous Oblast	Rostislav Goldstein (UR)	Resigned	2020: 82.50%	▌ ✓ Maria Kostyuk (inc.) (UR) 83.02%; ▌ Vasily Gladkikh (LDPR) 7.33%; ▌ Aleksandr Shcherbina (CPRF) 4.91%; ▌ Aleksandr Krupsky (CPCR) 3.01%
Jewish Autonomous Oblast	Maria Kostyuk (UR)	Acting Governor elected	–	▌ ✓ Maria Kostyuk (inc.) (UR) 83.02%; ▌ Vasily Gladkikh (LDPR) 7.33%; ▌ Aleksandr Shcherbina (CPRF) 4.91%; ▌ Aleksandr Krupsky (CPCR) 3.01%

=== Gubernatorial indirect elections ===
Region	Incumbent	Status	Last race	Result
Nenets Autonomous Okrug	Yury Bezdudny (UR)	Resigned	2020: 14/16	—
Nenets Autonomous Okrug	Irina Gecht (UR)	Acting Governor	—	Irina Gecht 16 / 19

=== Legislative elections ===
Legislature	Seats	Voting system	Majority in last election		Majority after election	
Komi Republic	30	Parallel (15 party list + 15 SMC)	United Russia	20 / 30	United Russia	25 / 30
Belgorod Oblast	50	Parallel (25 party list + 25 SMC)	United Russia	44 / 50	United Russia	46 / 50
Chelyabinsk Oblast	60	Parallel (30 party list + 30 SMC)	United Russia	43 / 60	United Russia	45 / 60
Kaluga Oblast	40	Parallel (20 party list + 20 SMC)	United Russia	29 / 40	United Russia	32 / 40
Kostroma Oblast	35	Parallel (10 party list + 25 SMC)	United Russia	24 / 35	United Russia	26 / 35
Kurgan Oblast	34	Parallel (17 party list + 17 SMC)	United Russia	27 / 34	United Russia	29 / 34
Magadan Oblast	21	Parallel (11 party list + 10 SMC)	United Russia	16 / 21	United Russia	17 / 21
Novosibirsk Oblast	76	Parallel (38 party list + 38 SMC)	United Russia	45 / 76	United Russia	51 / 76
Ryazan Oblast	40	Parallel (20 party list + 20 SMC)	United Russia	29 / 40	United Russia	37 / 40
Voronezh Oblast	56	Parallel (28 party list + 28 SMC)	United Russia	48 / 56	United Russia	51 / 56
Yamalo-Nenets Autonomous Okrug	22	Parallel (11 party list + 11 SMC)	United Russia	18 / 22	United Russia	18 / 22

=== Legislative by-elections ===
Constituency		Incumbent		This Race	
Legislature	No	Former member	Party	Results	Candidates
Saratov Oblast Duma	4	Mikhail Isayev	United Russia	Incumbent resigned August 14, 2024, to become Head of Engelssky District; New member elected September 14, 2025; United Russia hold	▌ ✓ Dmitry Lygin (UR) 58.90%; ▌ Sergey Podsevalov (CPRF) 17.04%; ▌ Yegor Lesnoy (LDPR) 11.87%; ▌ Aleksey Silkin (Independent) 6.07%; ▌ Angelina Revina (SR–ZP) 5.30%
Tula Oblast Duma	9	Nikolay Vorobyov	United Russia	Incumbent resigned September 13, 2024, to become Senator of the Federation Council; New member elected September 14, 2025; United Russia hold	▌ ✓ Yury Lyubarsky (UR) 65.12%; ▌ Anastasia Soboleva (CPRF) 14.30%; ▌ Aleksandr Marinkov (LDPR) 11.40%; ▌ Kirill Tarasenko (SR–ZP) 7.01%
State Council of the Republic of Tatarstan	18	Gennady Yemelyanov	United Russia	Incumbent resigned September 20, 2024, to become Senator of the Federation Council; New member elected September 14, 2025; Independent gain	▌ ✓ Andrey Fomichyov (Independent) 67.27%; ▌ Rail Minegaliyev (New People) 19.18%; ▌ Tatyana Mukhina (CPRF) 8.11%; ▌ Diana Poleva (LDPR) 4.43%
Bryansk Oblast Duma	26	Vasily Popadaylo	United Russia	Incumbent resigned September 24, 2024, to become Senator of the Federation Council; New member elected September 14, 2025; United Russia hold	▌ ✓ Yevgeny Vyltsan (UR) 57.68%; ▌ Igor Firsov (CPRF) 15.89%; ▌ Nikita Kobzev (LDPR) 13.35%; ▌ Dmitry Stalmakhovich (SR–ZP) 7.12%
Legislative Duma of Khabarovsk Krai	16	Viktor Kalashnikov	United Russia	Incumbent resigned September 25, 2024, to become Senator of the Federation Council; New member elected September 14, 2025; United Russia hold	▌ ✓ Valery Samokhin (UR) 49.40%; ▌ Nadezhda Veremyeva (SR–ZP) 13.00%; ▌ Valentin Kvyatkovsky (LDPR) 12.40%; ▌ Andrey Zhila (CPRF) 10.74%; ▌ Veniamin Stelmakh (New People) 8.72%
State Assembly of the Altai Republic	2	Artur Kokhoyev	United Russia	Incumbent resigned September 26, 2024, to become Senator of the Federation Council; New member elected September 14, 2025; United Russia hold	▌ ✓ Valentin Dekenov (UR) 47.19%; ▌ Askar Tulebayev (CPRF) 22.05%; ▌ Vasily Kudirmekov (Independent) 19.35%; ▌ Vyacheslav Kharin (Independent) 5.17%; ▌ Vera Shchukina (LDPR) 3.94%
Saratov Oblast Duma	25	Ivan Baboshkin	United Russia	Incumbent resigned October 2, 2024, to become Head of Zavodskoy District of Saratov; New member elected September 14, 2025; United Russia hold	▌ ✓ Antonina Galyashkina (UR) 54.40%; ▌ Olga Kalugina (CPRF) 17.75%; ▌ Dmitry Lyalin (LDPR) 16.31%; ▌ Natalya Sapozhnikova (Independent) 10.81%
Arkhangelsk Oblast Assembly of Deputies	21	Sergey Emmanuilov	United Russia	Incumbent died October 19, 2024; New member elected September 14, 2025; United Russia hold	▌ ✓ Aleksey Kruptsov (UR) 61.91%; ▌ Aleksey Burylin (CPRF) 13.59%; ▌ Vladislav Smelov (SR–ZP) 12.72%; ▌ Ivan Sadula (LDPR) 8.49%
People's Khural of Kalmykia	11	Valery Boldyrev	United Russia	Incumbent resigned December 4, 2024, to become acting Head of Chernozemelsky District; New member elected September 14, 2025; United Russia hold	▌ ✓ Sanal Bembeyev (UR) 80.38%; ▌ Yekaterina Shakhanova (LDPR) 9.56%; ▌ Boris Khamayev (SR–ZP) 9.08%
Legislative Assembly of Zabaykalsky Krai	16	Denis Kosyan	United Russia	Incumbent died December 25, 2024; New member elected September 14, 2025; United Russia hold	▌ ✓ Roman Sitnikov (UR) 63.34%; ▌ Sergey Antonovsky (LDPR) 22.83%; ▌ Viktoria Sherstyankina (Independent) 5.00%; ▌ Kirill Yakimov (New People) 4.12%
Legislative Assembly of Rostov Oblast	13	Vladimir Revenko	United Russia	Incumbent resigned February 20, 2025, to become Deputy Governor of Rostov Oblast; New member elected September 14, 2025; United Russia hold	▌ ✓ Zinaida Neyarokhina (UR) 63.38%; ▌ Aleksandr Dedovich (CPRF) 25.07%; ▌ Galina Zhukova (LDPR) 10.18%
State Council of the Udmurt Republic	35	Aleksey Vershinin	United Russia	Incumbent expelled February 25, 2025, after being indicted for bribery New member elected September 14, 2025; United Russia hold	▌ ✓ Ivan Semakin (UR) 68.86%; ▌ Ruslan Kolbasyuk (CPRF) 11.93%; ▌ Ilya Gilyazov (LDPR) 8.34%; ▌ Sergey Gromov (SR–ZP) 8.03%
State Council of the Udmurt Republic	6	Viktor Dyakov	United Russia	Incumbent died March 8, 2025, after suicide attempt New member elected September 14, 2025; United Russia hold	▌ ✓ Andrey Fefilov (UR) 52.27%; ▌ Andrey Blinov (SR–ZP); ▌ Angelina Vorobyeva (CPRF); ▌ Ksenia Zavoyskikh (LDPR)
Saratov Oblast Duma	9	Aleksandr Burmak	United Russia	Incumbent resigned March 14, 2025, to become Deputy Mayor of Saratov; New member elected September 14, 2025; United Russia hold	▌ ✓ Sergey Ovsyannikov (UR) 56.48%; ▌ Andrey Bazhenov (CPRF) 16.50%; ▌ Yekaterina Melnikova (LDPR) 11.92%; ▌ Artyom Tsarev (Independent) 8.85%; ▌ Armen Ktoyan (SR–ZP) 5.81%
People's Khural of the Republic of Buryatia	15	Denis Garmayev	United Russia	Incumbent resigned April 24, 2025, to become Minister of Industry, Trade, and Investments of Buryatia; New member elected September 14, 2025; United Russia hold	▌ ✓ Pavel Fedorov (UR) 60.56%; ▌ Leontiy Krasovsky (CPRF) 24.86%; ▌ Shirap Khaludorov (New People) 8.19%; ▌ Vasily Sayapin (LDPR) 4.35%

== Municipal elections ==
=== Mayoral elections ===
City	Incumbent	Date	Status	Last race	Results
Tayshet (Irkutsk Oblast)	Valery Zakharich (IND) acting mayor	Feb 2, 2025	Retiring	–	▌ ✓ Ruslan Leonenko (UR) 51.10%; ▌ Edita Kanunik (CPRF) 22.75%; ▌ Anton Afonin (Independent) 18.62%; ▌ Ilya Golovnya (New People) 3.55%; ▌ Marina Pantyushina (LDPR) 1.18%; ▌ Yulia Lazarevich (GP) 0.70%
Aldan (Sakha Republic)	Vladimir Shedko (UR) acting mayor	Sep 14, 2025	Elected	–	▌ ✓ Vladimir Shedko (inc.) (UR) 51.13%; ▌ Oleg Sarafannikov (SR–ZP) 34.18%; ▌ Andrey Purdyshov (Independent) 5.23%; ▌ Pavel Radin (CPRF) 3.34%; ▌ Anna Yemelyanova (LDPR) 2.89%
Pokrovsk (Sakha Republic)	Pyotr Germogenov (UR)	Sep 14, 2025	Retiring	74.60%	▌ ✓ Viktor Konstantinov (New People) 54.25%; ▌ Yegor Petrov (UR) 20.93%; ▌ Sergey Andreyev (Independent) 15.59%; ▌ N'yykap Dalyn (Independent) 2.99%; ▌ Semyon Struchkov (LDPR) 1.06%
Verkhoyansk (Sakha Republic)	Mikhail Sadovnikov (UR)	Sep 14, 2025	Re-elected	44.66% (Note: elected as A Just Russia candidate)	▌ ✓ Mikhail Sadovnikov (inc.) (UR) 80.94%; ▌ Yegor Popov (Independent) 16.25%
Chernogorsk (Khakassia)	Vasily Belonogov (UR)	Sep 14, 2025	Retiring	28.22%	▌ ✓ Yelena Gopina (CPRF) 29.20%; ▌ Vyacheslav Finogenov (UR) 27.56%; ▌ Denis Kakayev (PARZAS) 16.40%; ▌ Aleksey Ruzaykin (New People) 10.70%; ▌ Ruslan Popovich (Independent) 10.36%; ▌ Svetlana Bulatova (CPCR) 2.23%; ▌ Aleksey Khabarov (Rodina) 1.14%
Vyazemsky (Khabarovsk Krai)	Sergey Khotinets (UR)	Sep 14, 2025	Re-elected	59.45%	▌ ✓ Sergey Khotinets (inc.) (UR) 39.45%; ▌ Vladimir Tezikov (Independent) 34.39%; ▌ Dmitry Utkin (LDPR) 22.06%
Angarsk (Irkutsk Oblast)	Sergey Petrov (UR)	Sep 14, 2025	Re-elected	65.47%	▌ ✓ Sergey Petrov (inc.) (UR) 55.03%; ▌ Andrey Bolgov (SR–ZP) 25.04%; ▌ Dmitry Lobanov (CPRF) 5.66%; ▌ Dmitry Tyutrin (LDPR) 5.25%; ▌ Mark Ananchenkov (New People) 2.02%; ▌ Vyacheslav Belousov (GP) 1.32%; ▌ Aleksey Shodonov (RPSS) 1.18%; ▌ Pavel Dobrodeyev (Rodina) 1.16%
Cheremkhovo (Irkutsk Oblast)	Vadim Semyonov (UR)	Sep 14, 2025	Re-elected	86.99%	▌ ✓ Vadim Semyonov (inc.) (UR) 84.62%; ▌ Darya Sivtseva (New People) 7.81%; ▌ Yaroslav Yevdokimov (GP) 4.19%
Svirsk (Irkutsk Oblast)	Vladimir Ornoyev (UR)	Sep 14, 2025	Re-elected	90.03%	▌ ✓ Vladimir Ornoyev (inc.) (UR) 78.92%; ▌ Tatyana Reichert (LDPR) 8.14%; ▌ Aleksandr Kustov (CPRF) 5.30%; ▌ Sergey Yermakov (New People) 4.29%
Sovetsky (Khanty-Mansi Autonomous Okrug)	Aleksandr Kulagin (UR)	Sep 14, 2025	Re-elected	42.40%	▌ ✓ Aleksandr Kulagin (inc.) (UR) 45.29%; ▌ Yury Sukhitsky (New People) 16.45%; ▌ Artyom Aminov (CPRF) 15.13%; ▌ Anna Kalugina (SR–ZP) 10.78%; ▌ Aleksandr Babikov (LDPR) 4.43%; ▌ Aleksandr Blinov (Independent) 2.79%; ▌ Maksim Logachev (CPCR) 2.55%

=== District elections ===
District	Incumbent	Date	Status	Last race	Results
Bratsky District (Irkutsk Oblast)	Oksana Korotkova (UR) acting mayor	Feb 2, 2025	Retiring	–	▌ ✓ Nikolay Druzhinin (UR) 50.32%; ▌ Olga Bashkova (LDPR) 27.85%; ▌ Aleksey Balovnev (CPRF) 11.76%; ▌ Larisa Pavlova (Independent) 6.64%; ▌ Sergey Pavlov (ROS) 1.02%
Khangalassky District (Sakha Republic)	Oleg Irineyev (UR)	Sep 14, 2025	Lost re-nomination	55.95%	▌ ✓ Sergey Grebnev (Independent) 51.55%; ▌ Aytalina Vasilyeva (UR) 44.27%; ▌ Nadezhda Ammosova (SR–ZP) 1.28%; ▌ Pyotr Tretyakov (LDPR) 0.63%; ▌ Aleksey Gorbulin (CPCR) 0.62%; ▌ Vladimir Ionin (Rodina) 0.28%
Olenyoksky District (Sakha Republic)	Lena Ivanova (UR)	Sep 14, 2025	Retiring	79.16%	▌ ✓ Ivan Savvinov (Independent) 45.47%; ▌ Khristofor Vasilyev (UR) 39.70%; ▌ Nikan Nikolayev (Independent) 12.99%; ▌ Vladislav Aleksandrov (Independent) 1.46%
Suntarsky District (Sakha Republic)	Anatoly Grigoryev (UR)	Sep 14, 2025	Re-elected	86.83%	▌ ✓ Anatoly Grigoryev (inc.) (UR) 58.21%; ▌ Ivan Alekseyev (New People) 38.28%; ▌ Aleksey Vasilyev (Independent) 2.77%
Ust-Aldansky District (Sakha Republic)	Ilya Artamonov (IND) acting mayor	Sep 14, 2025	Retiring	–	▌ ✓ Vasily Alekseyev (Independent) 54.19%; ▌ Vasily Ammosov (Independent) 43.14%; ▌ Roman Kalininsky (Independent) 1.36%; ▌ Vladimir Maksimov (Independent) 0.16%
Balagansky District (Irkutsk Oblast)	Roman Metlyayev (UR)	Sep 14, 2025	Re-elected	51.48% (Note: elected as LDPR candidate)	▌ ✓ Roman Metlyayev (inc.) (UR) 64.14%; ▌ Mikhail Kibanov (Independent) 31.41%; ▌ Yury Belashov (LDPR) 1.88%
Irkutsky District (Irkutsk Oblast)	Leonid Frolov (UR)	Sep 14, 2025	Re-elected	35.73%	▌ ✓ Leonid Frolov (inc.) (UR) 43.99%; ▌ Yevgeny Fayzulin (New People) 21.86%; ▌ Maksim Artemyev (LDPR) 11.61%; ▌ Yelena Smirnova (GP) 8.60%; ▌ Mikhail Toropov (RPSS) 5.83%
Kachugsky District (Irkutsk Oblast)	Yevgeny Lipatov (UR)	Sep 14, 2025	Re-elected	69.98%	▌ ✓ Yevgeny Lipatov (inc.) (UR) 72.17%; ▌ Pavel Kozlov (SR–ZP) 15.10%; ▌ Aleksandr Antonov (LDPR) 7.88%; ▌ Aleksandr Kozlov (GP) 3.28%
Kirensky District (Irkutsk Oblast)	Kirill Svistelin (UR)	Sep 14, 2025	Re-elected	78.78%	▌ ✓ Kirill Svistelin (inc.) (UR) 61.94%; ▌ Aleksey Mikhaylov (CPRF) 22.01%; ▌ Igor Aleksandrov (New People) 6.47%; ▌ Vinaly Sukhanov (Independent) 3.86%; ▌ Sergey Reznikov (LDPR) 3.61%
Mamsko-Chuysky District (Irkutsk Oblast)	Aleksey Morozov (IND)	Sep 14, 2025	Retiring	32.05%	▌ ✓ Aleksey Ushakov (UR) 54.43%; ▌ Aleksandr Sergey (SR–ZP) 41.98%
Nizhneilimsky District (Irkutsk Oblast)	Maksim Romanov (UR)	Sep 14, 2025	Lost re-nomination	44.46%	▌ ✓ Pavel Berezovsky (UR) 78.54%; ▌ Nikolay Sotnikov (CPRF) 12.19%; ▌ Yevgeny Likhachyov (SR–ZP) 3.89%; ▌ Maria Yankina (Rodina) 1.73%; ▌ Dmitry Perov (LDPR) 1.61%
Nukutsky District (Irkutsk Oblast)	Aleksandr Platokhonov (UR)	Sep 14, 2025	Re-elected	64.14%	▌ ✓ Aleksandr Platokhonov (inc.) (UR) 51.04%; ▌ Viktor Tapkharov (Independent) 39.59%; ▌ Larisa Yegiazaryan (LDPR) 4.19%; ▌ Aleksandr Zherbakov (GP) 3.38%
Tayshetsky District (Irkutsk Oblast)	Aleksandr Kuzin (UR)	Sep 14, 2025	Re-elected	40.51%	▌ ✓ Aleksandr Kuzin (inc.) (UR) 69.94%; ▌ Aleksandr Monichev (RPSS) 9.39%; ▌ Yevgenia Syuzeva (Rodina) 8.06%; ▌ Asia Spiridonova (GP) 6.78%
Ust-Kutsky District (Irkutsk Oblast)	Sergey Anisimov (UR)	Sep 14, 2025	Re-elected	35.76%	▌ ✓ Sergey Anisimov (inc.) (UR) 42.82%; ▌ Svetlana Bazhenova (GP) 31.82%; ▌ Sergey Shelyomin (CPRF) 6.14%; ▌ Yelena Gorinchoy (RPPSS) 5.08%; ▌ Andrey Noskov (New People) 3.80%; ▌ Mikhail Trufanov (SR–ZP) 2.67%; ▌ Yulia Balabanova (RPSS) 1.55%; ▌ Sergey Kulakovsky (Rodina) 1.46%
Zalarinsky District (Irkutsk Oblast)	Vladimir Samoylovich (UR)	Sep 14, 2025	Re-elected	78.47%	▌ ✓ Vladimir Samoylovich (inc.) (UR) 80.28%; ▌ Vasily Davydov (LDPR) 12.04%; ▌ Mikhail Meng (Independent) 5.29%
Zhigalovsky District (Irkutsk Oblast)	Igor Fedorovsky (UR)	Sep 14, 2025	Re-elected	79.51%	▌ ✓ Igor Fedorovsky (inc.) (UR) 77.92%; ▌ Nikita Deyev (Independent) 10.50%; ▌ Maksim Burlakov (Independent) 6.87%
Ziminsky District (Irkutsk Oblast)	Natalya Nikitina (UR)	Sep 14, 2025	Re-elected	37.01%	▌ ✓ Natalya Nikitina (inc.) (UR) 40.89%; ▌ Nikolay Andreyev (Independent) 30.67%; ▌ Anna Ishchenkova (LDPR) 13.09%; ▌ Sergey Rumyantsev (CPRF) 8.85%; ▌ Aleksey Andreyev (GP) 4.32%
Ust-Udinsky District (Irkutsk Oblast)	Sergey Chemezov (UR)	Oct 19, 2025	Re-elected	73.47%	▌ ✓ Sergey Chemezov (inc.) (UR) 57.43%; ▌ Aleksandr Meng (LDPR) 21.56%; ▌ Valery Madasov (Independent) 19.44%

=== Municipal Council elections ===
Municipal body	Seats	Voting system	Majority in last election		Majority after election	
Cheboksary City Council of Deputies (Chuvashia)	43	Parallel (22 party list + 21 SMC)	United Russia	30 / 43	United Russia	29 / 43
Assembly of Deputies of Makhachkala (Note: In 2015 and 2020 Assembly of Deputies of Makhachkala members were proportionally delegated from three city districts, however, the two-tier system of local government was abolished in April 2025 and direct duma elections were scheduled for September 2025) (Dagestan)	45	Party-list proportional representation	United Russia	40 / 45	United Russia	34 / 45
Council of Syktyvkar (Komi Republic)	30	First-past-the-post	United Russia	20 / 30	United Russia	27 / 30
Kazan City Duma (Tatarstan)	50	Parallel (25 party list + 25 SMC)	United Russia	34 / 50	United Russia	36 / 50
City Duma of Izhevsk (Udmurtia)	35	Parallel (10 party list + 25 SMC)	United Russia	24 / 35	United Russia	28 / 35
City Duma of Krasnodar (Krasnodar Krai)	52	Parallel (13 party list + 39 SMC)	United Russia	42 / 52	United Russia	38 / 52
Stavropol City Duma (Note: Original term was set to expire in 2026. Early election was called after the City Duma dissolved itself in April 2025.) (Stavropol Krai)	39	Parallel (13 party list + 26 SMC)	United Russia	27 / 30	United Russia	34 / 39
City Duma of Astrakhan (Astrakhan Oblast)	36	First-past-the-post	United Russia	22 / 36	United Russia	28 / 36
Ivanovo City Duma (Ivanovo Oblast)	30	Parallel (10 party list + 20 SMC)	United Russia	26 / 30	United Russia	27 / 30
City Duma of Kaluga (Kaluga Oblast)	36	Parallel (10 party list + 26 SMC)	United Russia	26 / 35	United Russia	28 / 36
Duma of Kostroma (Kostroma Oblast)	33	First-past-the-post	United Russia	29 / 33	United Russia	31 / 33
Lipetsk City Council of Deputies (Lipetsk Oblast)	36	First-past-the-post	United Russia	34 / 36	United Russia	32 / 36
Magadan City Duma (Magadan Oblast)	21	First-past-the-post	United Russia	19 / 21	United Russia	21 / 21
City Duma of Nizhny Novgorod (Nizhny Novgorod Oblast)	35	First-past-the-post	United Russia	26 / 35	United Russia	24 / 35
Council of Deputies of Novosibirsk (Novosibirsk Oblast)	50	First-past-the-post	United Russia	23 / 50	United Russia	40 / 50
Orenburg City Council (Orenburg Oblast)	40	Parallel (20 party list + 20 SMC)	United Russia	30 / 40	United Russia	32 / 40
Oryol City Council of People's Deputies (Oryol Oblast)	38	Parallel (10 party list + 28 SMC)	United Russia	22 / 38	United Russia	24 / 38
Rostov-on-Don City Duma (Rostov Oblast)	40	Parallel (10 party list + 30 SMC)	United Russia	35 / 40	United Russia	34 / 40
Duma of Samara (Note: In 2015 and 2020 Duma of Samara members were proportionally delegated from nine city districts, however, the two-tier system of local government was abolished in March 2025 and direct duma elections were scheduled for September 2025) (Samara Oblast)	37	First-past-the-post	United Russia	32 / 37	United Russia	31 / 37
Smolensk City Council (Smolensk Oblast)	30	Parallel (10 party list + 20 SMC)	United Russia	23 / 30	United Russia	25 / 30
Tambov City Duma (Tambov Oblast)	36	Parallel (18 party list + 18 SMC)	Rodina	26 / 36	United Russia	27 / 36
Duma of Tomsk (Tomsk Oblast)	37	Parallel (10 party list + 27 SMC)	United Russia	11 / 27	United Russia	31 / 37
Ulyanovsk City Duma (Ulyanovsk Oblast)	40	First-past-the-post	United Russia	36 / 40	United Russia	30 / 40
Council of People's Deputies of Vladimir (Vladimir Oblast)	25	First-past-the-post	United Russia	25 / 25	United Russia	22 / 25
Voronezh City Duma (Voronezh Oblast)	36	Parallel (12 party list + 24 SMC)	United Russia	25 / 36	United Russia	25 / 36

== Results ==
In Kursk Oblast, acting governor Alexander Khinshtein won 86.9% of the vote, while in Bryansk Oblast, Alexander Bogomaz was re-elected governor with 78.8%. Rustam Minnikhanov won a fourth term as head of Tatarstan with 88.1% of the vote, the highest among governors and heads of republics in the election. In Irkutsk Oblast, governor Igor Kobzev was re-elected with 60.8%. In Arkhangelsk Oblast, Alexander Tsybulsky won 67.3% in his reelection for governor. The governor of Kamchatka Krai, Vladimir Solodov, was reelected in a reduced vote share, from 80.5% in 2020 to 63% amid criticism by residents over his handling of the 2025 Kamchatka earthquake in July. Oleg Nikolayev of Chuvashia, an independent, became the only non-United Russia member to be reelected as governor in the election. The party also saw its vote share reach less than 50% of the vote in elections for regional assemblies in Komi Republic and Kostroma Oblast.
