= Vladimir Khabarov =

Russian politician

- Владимир Хабаров
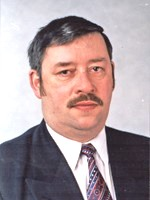

2nd Governor of Nenets Autonomous Okrug
- In office 21 March 1996 – 25 December 1996
- Preceded by: Yury Komarovsky
- Succeeded by: Vladimir Butov

Personal details
- Born: Vladimir Viktorovich Khabarov; 11 February 1951 Andeg, Nenets AO, RSFSR, Soviet Union
- Died: 29 July 2010 (aged 59) Naryan-Mar, Russia
- Party: United Russia

Vladimir Viktorovich Khabarov (Russian: Владимир Викторович Хабаров; 11 February 1951 – 29 July 2010), was a Russian politician who had served as the second Governor of Nenets Autonomous Okrug in 1996.

== Biography ==
Vladimir Khabarov was born on 11 February 1951 in the village of Andeg, Nenets Autonomous Okrug.

His first job was at the accounting department of the Malozemelsky fish cooperative. He graduated from the Arkhangelsk Cooperative College, the Leningrad Higher Party School, the Faculty of Social Work of the Arkhangelsk Medical Institute (specialty - teacher of scientific communism and social science, social work).

He worked as an auditor in the Arkhangelsk fishery-consumer union, a senior accountant of the Nenets regional branch of the Vuktyl directorate for the construction of a gas pipeline and gas production enterprises, a senior auditor of the Control and Auditing Department of the RSFSR Ministry of Finance in the Nenets Autonomous Okrug.

From 1969 to 1971, he had served in the Soviet Army.

In the 1980s, he was the secretary of the party committee of the state farm, instructor of the Nenets district committee of the CPSU.

In 1994, he worked as a manager of the department of the Pension Fund of the Russian Federation in the Nenets Autonomous Okrug, created the unified pension system of the NAO.

From 1994 to 1996 Khabarov was a member of the Assembly of Deputies of the Nenets Autonomous Okrug.

On 21 March 1996, Khabarov was appointed the 2nd Governor (Head) of the Nenets Autonomous Oblast to replace Yury Komarovsky, who ha retired. By Order No. 182 of 27 March 1996, he canceled the title of the post “Governor of the Nenets Autonomous Okrug” introduced by Komarovsky in 1993, as it was not provided for by the Charter of the Nenets Autonomous Okrug. In April 1996, he entered the Federation Council ex officio, and was a member of the Committee on Science, Culture, Education, Healthcare and Ecology.

In December 1996, Khabarov ran for the post of head of the administration of the Nenets Autonomous Okrug. On 1 December, in the first round, he took first place, gaining 40.64% of the votes, in the second round, held on 13 December, he lost to Vladimir Butov, a member of Assembly of Deputies of the Nenets Autonomous Okrug, whom Khabarov the gaining 40.27% of the votes.

Khaborov advocated the independence of the NAO from the Arkhangelsk Oblast.

From 2005 to 2009, Khabarov was a member of the Assembly of Deputies of the Nenets Autonomous Okrug again.

In the last years of his life, he headed the Regional Compulsory Health Insurance Fund.

Vladimir Viktorovich Khabarov died on 29 July 2010 after a long illness.

He was married, and had two children.
