= Gecht (surname) =

Gecht is a surname. Notable people having the surname include:

- Irina Gecht, a Russian politician serving as Governor of Nenets Autonomous Okrug since 2025
- Robin Gecht, member of the Ripper Crew
- Guy Gecht, CEO of Electronics for Imaging
