= Alexander Nekrasov (politician) =

Russian politician

- Александр Некрасов
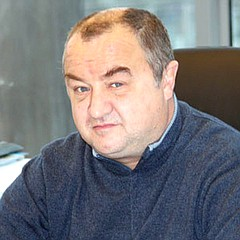

Russian Federation Senator from Arkhangelsk Oblast
- Representing the Executive
- In office 9 October 2020 – 29 January 2025
- Appointed by: Alexander Tsybulsky
- Preceded by: Viktor Pavlenko
- Succeeded by: Yury Borisov

Member of the State Duma (Party List Seat)
- In office 21 December 2011 – 14 October 2020
- Succeeded by: Roman Lyabikhov

Personal details
- Born: Alexander Nekrasov; 20 June 1963 (age 63) Severodvinsk, Arkhangelsk Oblast, RSFSR, USSR
- Party: CPRF
- Education: Saint Petersburg State University

Alexander Nikolayevich Nekrasov (Russian: Александр Николаевич Некрасов; born 20 June 1963) is a Russian politician serving as a senator from Arkhangelsk Oblast since 9 October 2020.

== Career ==
Alexander Nekrasov was born on 20 June 1963 in Severodvinsk, Arkhangelsk Oblast. In 1989, he graduated from the Karelian Pedagogical Institute. In 1999, he received another degree from the Saint Petersburg State University. In 1992, he moved to Saint Petersburg where he became one of the co-founders of holding "Leader Group" that specialized in construction of housing in St. Petersburg, the Leningrad oblast, Moscow and the Moscow oblast. From 2011 to 2020, he served as deputy of the 6th State Duma and 7th State Dumas as a member of the Communist Party of the Russian Federation (CPRF). On 9 October 2020, he was appointed Senator from Arkhangelsk Oblast.

== Sanctions ==
Alexander Nekrasov is under personal sanctions introduced by the European Union, the United Kingdom, the USA, Canada, Switzerland, Australia, Ukraine, New Zealand, for ratifying the decisions of the "Treaty of Friendship, Cooperation and Mutual Assistance between the Russian Federation and the Donetsk People's Republic and between the Russian Federation and the Luhansk People's Republic" and providing political and economic support for Russia's annexation of Ukrainian territories.
