= Valery Potapenko =

- Валерий Потапенко

5th Head of Nenets Autonomous Okrug Administration
- In office 2 June 2006 – 16 February 2009
- Preceded by: Alexey Barinov
- Succeeded by: Igor Fyodorov

Personal details
- Born: 10 June 1958 (age 68) Tajik SSR, Soviet Union
- Education: Tajik State University

Valery Nikolayevich Potapenko (Russian: Валерий Николаевич Потапенко; born on 10 June 1958), is a Tajik-born Russian politician, who had served at the 5th Governor (Head) of Nenets Autonomous Okrug from 2006 to 2009.

== Biography ==
Valery Potapenko was born in Tajikistan, Soviet Union on 10 June 1958.

In 1980, graduated from the Tajik State University. V.I. Lenin.

From 1980 to 1982, he was the Junior Researcher at the Tajik State University.

From 1982 to 1992, he was an employee of the KGB of the Tajik SSR.

From 1992 to 2004, he was an employee of the Office of the Federal Security Service for Saint Petersburg and the Leningrad Oblast.

In August 2004, he was appointed as the chief federal inspector for the Nenets Autonomous Okrug.

In June 2006, Potapenko was appointed the acting head of the Nenets Autonomous Okrug, after which he was approved in this position by the Assembly of Deputies of Nenets Autonomous Okrug on 2 June.

On 16 February 2009, the President of Russia, Dmitry Medvedev, dismissed Potapenko from the post of governor of the Nenets Autonomous Okrug at his own request.

On 2 November 2011, he was appointed Chief Federal Inspector for the Arkhangelsk Oblast.

He eventually became the head of the Department for Internal Policy of the Office of the Plenipotentiary Representative in the North-West Federal District.
