= Alexey Barinov =

Russian businessman and politician

- Алексей Баринов

4th Governor of Nenets Autonomous Okrug
- In office 6 February 2005 – 21 July 2006
- Preceded by: Vladimir Butov
- Succeeded by: Valery Potapenko

Personal details
- Born: 30 December 1951 (age 74) Taboshar, Leninabad Oblast, Tajik SSR, Soviet Union
- Education: Gubkin Institute

Alexey Viktorovich Barinov (Russian: Алексей Викторович Баринов; born December 30, 1951) is a Russian businessman and politician.

In 1974 he graduated from the Tyumen Industrial Institute, and in 1987 from the Moscow Institute of the Petrochemical and Gas Industry. Barinov worked in various oil and gas enterprises of Western Siberia throughout 1990s. From 1999 he was a member of the board of Murmansk Shipping Company.

In June 2000, he was elected a deputy of Arkhangelsk Regional Assembly from Severodvinsk. Layer he resigned as a member of the Assembly moving to the staff of the Envoy in the North Western Federal District. From April 2003 to August 2004 Barinov was federal inspector for Nenets Autonomous Okrug.

In 2005, he was elected governor of Nenets Autonomous Okrug. On May 24, 2006, he was arrested and on July 21 dismissed by President Vladimir Putin from his position. In September 2007, the Oktyabrsky Court of Arkhangelsk acquitted Barinov of all charges except for privatization of an apartment in Arkhangelsk given to him by Lukoil, for which he was sentenced to 3 years of suspended imprisonment.
