= Yury Komarovsky =

Russian politician (born 1952)

- Юрий Комаровский
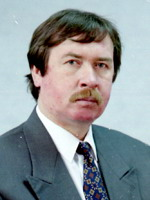

Mayor of Vereya
- In office March 1997 – November 2005

1st Governor of Nenets Autonomous Okrug
- In office 30 November 1991 – 22 February 1996
- Succeeded by: Vladimir Khabarov

Personal details
- Born: Yury Vladimirovich Komarovsky; 18 May 1952 (age 73) Obluchye, RSFSR, Soviet Union

Yury Vladimirovich Komarovsky (Russian: Юрий Владимирович Комаровский; born 18 May 1952) is a Russian politician and former military officer, who served as the 1st Governor of Nenets Autonomous Okrug.

== Biography ==
Komarovsky graduated from the Khabarovsk Institute of Railway Transport Engineers, and from 1974 to 1976 he served in the Soviet Army.

From 1976 to 1990, he worked as an engineer, a flight safety inspector, and a first deputy commander of the Naryan-Mar aviation enterprise for manufacturing.

In March 1990 he was elected a deputy of the Nenets Autonomous Okrug Council. From 1990 to 1991 - deputy chairman of the Naryan-Mar City Executive Committee.

On 30 November 1991, by presidential decree, Komarovsky was appointed head of administration of the Nenets Autonomous Okrug. In April 1993, Yury Komarovsky resigned as head of the administration, which was satisfied with President Boris Yeltsin on April 16, 1993. However, later he was reappointed as Governor of the Nenets Autonomous Okrug, providing for a change in the structure of the district administration, and the emergence of the institution of vice-governors.

In 1994, Komarovsky tried to hold a referendum on secession of NAO from Arkhangelsk Oblast. But then, the decree on the referendum was abolished by the decree of Yeltsin.

Since 1995, Yury Komarrovsky was chairman of the Council of the regional branch of the Movement "Our Home - Russia" in the Nenets Autonomous Okrug.

On 12 December 1993, he was elected along with Leonid Sablin to the Federation Council of Russia.

On the same year, he plagued a scandal with the local newspaper Naryana Vynder, accusing it of spreading false information about what was happening in the region.

On February 22, 1996, he was released by presidential decree from the post of head of the administration of the Nenets Autonomous Okrug at his own request. In December of the same year he ran for the governor of the district, but collected only 15% of the vote, he was not elected.

=== Moscow Oblast ===
From March 1997 to November 2005, Komarovsky was the head of the city administration of Vereya, Naro-Fominsky District, Moscow Oblast. In November 2005 he was elected head of the urban settlement of Vereya. In October 2009, he was elected chairman of the Council of Deputies of the city of Vereya, he is a deputy of the Council of Deputies of the Naro-Fominsk municipal district. Since 2009 - Director of the Verey Museum of History and Local Lore.

== Criminal case ==
In 1997, a criminal case was brought against Yury Komarovsky on the fact of his violation of the law in the distribution of loan funds for delivery to the Far North, and on June 5, 1997, he was taken into custody, being accused of abuse of authority by an official. This time Komarovsky was already the head of the city administration of Vereya. On 23 June 1997, the Naryan-Mar City Court found Komarovsky's preventive measure insufficiently substantiated and motivated, and therefore released him from custody in the courtroom. In May 1998, the criminal case against Yuri Komarovsky was terminated.
