= Andeg =

Village in Nenets Autonomous Okrug, Russia

Andeg Андег
- Interactive map of Andeg
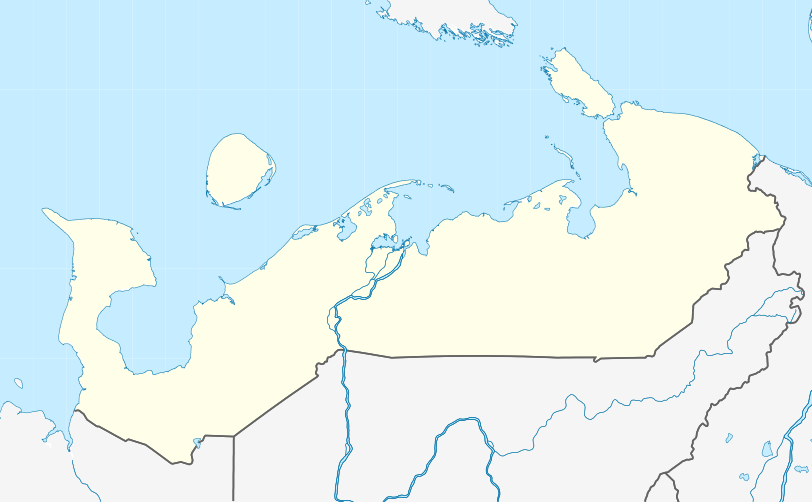
- Location of Andeg Andeg (Nenets Autonomous Okrug)
- Country: Russia
- Federal subject: Nenets Autonomous Okrug
- Founded: 1574

Area
  - Total: 5.167 km^{2} (1.995 sq mi)

Population (2010 Census)
  - Total: 175
  - Estimate (2021): 104 (−40.6%)
  - Density: 33.9/km^{2} (87.7/sq mi)
- Time zone: UTC+3 (MSK)
- Postal code: 166713
- Dialing code: +7 81853
- OKTMO ID: 11811431101
- Website: andeg.ucoz.ru

Andeg is a village in Zapolyarny District, Nenets Autonomous Okrug, Russia. It had a population of 175 as of 2010, a decrease from its population of 215 in 2002. Towards its eastern side, it borders the Pechora River, a long river spanning from the Ural Mountains to the Barents Sea.
