= Igor Koshin =

Russian politician (born 1974)

- Игорь Кошин
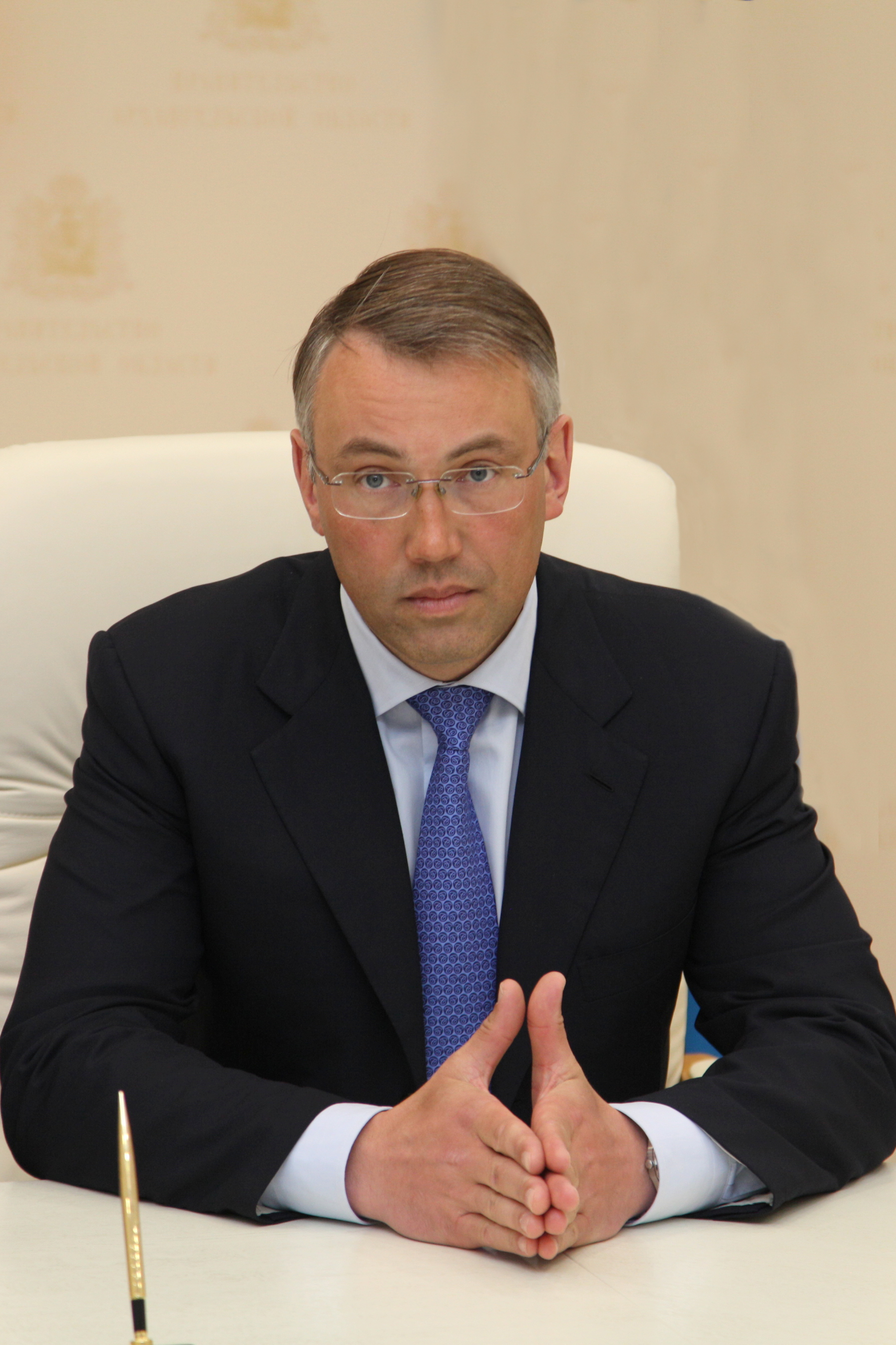
- Koshin in 2015

7th Governor of Nenets Autonomous Okrug
- In office 20 October 2014 – 28 September 2017
- Preceded by: Igor Fyodorov
- Succeeded by: Aleksandr Tsybulsky

Russian Federation Senator from the Nenets Autonomous Okrug
- In office 9 February 2012 – 26 February 2014
- Preceded by: Aleksey Panteleyev
- Succeeded by: Sergey Kotkin

Personal details
- Born: 27 August 1974 (age 51) Usinsk, Komi ASSR, Russian SFSR, Soviet Union
- Party: United Russia
- Profession: Geologist

Igor Viktorovich Koshin (Russian: Игорь Викторович Кошин: born 27 August 1974), is a Russian politician. He served as the Governor of the Nenets Autonomous Okrug, a federal subject of Russia from 2014 until 2017. He was also the Chairman of the Assembly of Deputies of the Nenets Autonomous Okrug from 2005 to 2012.
