= Yury Bezdudny =

Russian statesman

- Юрий Бездудный
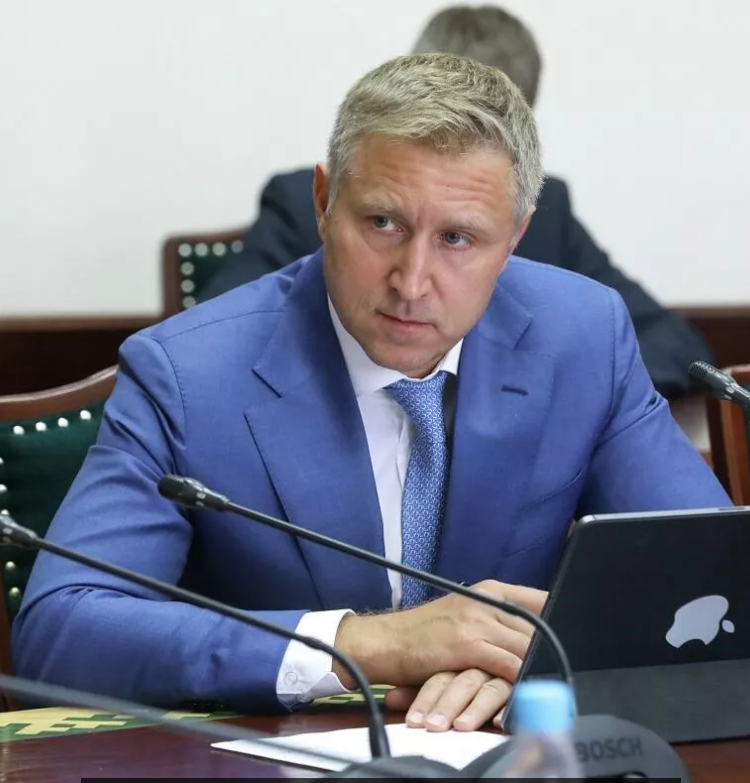
- Bezdudny in 2020

9th Governor of Nenets Autonomous Okrug
- In office 2 April 2020 – 18 March 2025
- Preceded by: Alexander Tsybulsky
- Succeeded by: Irina Gecht

Personal details
- Born: Yury Vasilyevich Bezdudny; 1 May 1969 (age 57) Bryansk Oblast, Russia, Soviet Union
- Party: United Russia

Yury Vasilyevich Bezdudny (Russian: Юрий Васильевич Бездудный; born 1 May 1969), is a Russian politician who has served as the 9th Governor of Nenets Autonomous Okrug from 2020 to 2025.

He is the Acting Secretary of the Nenets Regional Branch of the United Russia Party since 3 December 2021.

== Biography ==
Yury Bezdudny was born on 1 May 1969 in Bryansk Oblast.

Since 1987, he has been in the service of the state security bodies of the Soviet Union and Russia.

In 1991 he graduated from the Oryol Higher Military Command School of Communications named after M. I. Kalinin.

In 2001, he studied at the Oryol Regional Academy of Public Administration, and later, the Moscow Psychological and Social Institute. He has a master's degree in business administration.

In 2007, Bezdudny was appointed deputy head of the Bryansk City Administration. From 2013 to 2014, he was Vice President of Interactive Bank LLC, then he served as Deputy Head of Administration of the Odintsovsky District of the Moscow Region, and from 18 March 2019, Deputy Governor of the Nenets Autonomous Okrug, under Alexander Tsybulsky. His area of responsibility included the activities of the administration of the district, as well as the department of natural resources, ecology and agro-industrial complex, the department of digital development, communications and mass communications, the department of construction, housing and communal services, energy and transport. In addition, the implementation of national projects in the district.

=== Governor of Nenets Autonomous Okrug ===
On 2 April 2020, by decree of Russian President Vladimir Putin, Bezdudny was appointed acting governor of the Nenets Autonomous Okrug for the period until the elections due to the transfer of Tsybulsky, who held this position, to the leadership of the Arkhangelsk Oblast.

On 13 May 2020, the acting governors of Nenets Autonomous Okrug and the Arkhangelsk Oblast signed a memorandum "On the intention to form a new subject of the Russian Federation by combining the Arkhangelsk Oblast and the Nenets Autonomous Okrug."

It was stated that the unification of the “matryoshka” region (NAO, as an independent subject of the federation, is simultaneously part of the Arkhangelsk Oblast) will reduce administrative costs, insure the NAO against falling oil and gas revenues and more evenly distribute budget expenditures (more than 1.1 million people live in the Arkhangelsk Oblast, in the NAO - 44 thousand).

On May 26, Bezdudny said that the document does not automatically start the process of merging the two regions and that, in view of the protests that have begun, it is necessary to study the situation more carefully. Instead of a political unification, the development of a joint program for the economic development of regions with the assistance of the Ministry of Economic Development was announced.

On 16 June 2020, the General Council of the United Russia party announced that it would support the candidacy of Bezdudny in the elections for the governor of the Nenets Autonomous Okrug, scheduled for a single voting day on 13 September 2020.

On 2 July 2020, Bezdudny explained the results of the all-Russian vote on amendments to the Constitution in the NAO, which became the only region that opposed (55.25%), the negative reaction of voters to plans for unification with the Arkhangelsk Oblast.

On 6 July 2020, Bezdudny instructed to convene a working group on the content of a new agreement on cooperation in the exercise of state powers between the Nenets Autonomous Okrug and the Arkhangelsk Oblast. The current contract expires on 31 December 2022.

On 8 July 2020, he declared the issue of unification with the Arkhangelsk Oblast closed.

On 13 September 2020, at the regular session of the deputies of the parliament of the Nenets Autonomous Okrug, Bezdudny was elected governor of the region by 14 votes out of 16 for a term of 5 years. On 14 September, he appointed Naryan-Mar City Council Chairman Denis Gusev as a new senator from the executive body of state power of the district.

On 18 March 2025, Bezdudny announced his resignation due to a transition to another position, and on the same day, by a presidential decree, was relieved of his duties.
