= Governor of Nenets Autonomous Okrug =

Highest-ranking official in the Nenets Autonomous Okrug, Russia

- Coat of arms of NAO

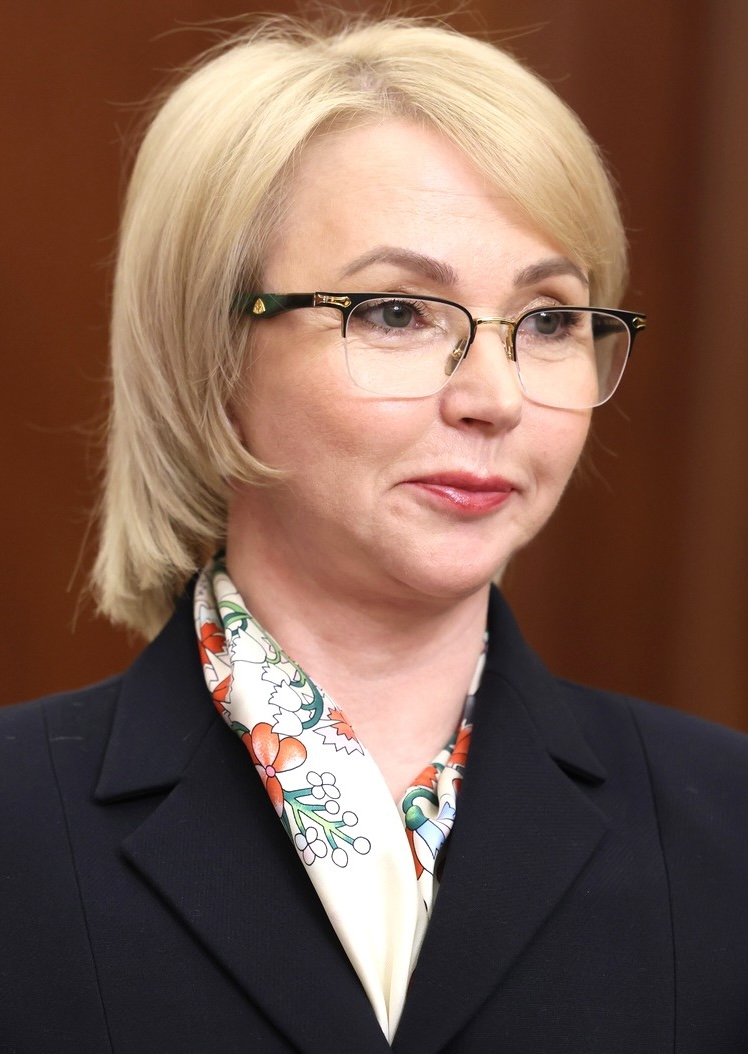
- Incumbent; Irina Gecht since 23 September 2025
- Seat: Naryan-Mar
- Term length: 5 years
- Formation: 1991
- First holder: Yury Komarovsky
- Website: adm-nao.ru

The governor of Nenets Autonomous Okrug (Russian: Губернатор Ненецкого автономного округа) is the head of the executive branch of the Nenets Autonomous Okrug, a federal subject of Russia located in the north-west of the country's European part. The Governor is elected by the Assembly of Deputies of Nenets Autonomous Okrug for a term of five years.

== History of office ==
On 30 November 1991, the first deputy Chairman of Naryan-Mar Executive Committee Yury Komarovsky was appointed Head of Administration of Nenets Autonomous Okrug by the decree of the President of Russia Boris Yeltsin. In February 1996, Komarovsky was removed from his post by a decree of the President of Russia. The resignation was caused by a conflict with the Assembly of Deputies, which accused Komarovsky of misappropriating budget funds.

Member of the Assembly Vladimir Khabarov was appointed new head of administration. In December 1996 he lost the election to entrepreneur Vladimir Butov. Butov was re-elected in 2001. Four years later Alexey Barinov was elected 4th head of administration of NAO. These were the last gubernatorial elections in Russia until October 2012 due to major legislation change imposed by president Vladimir Putin in late 2004.

In September 2014 Nenets AO hold its fourth gubernatorial elections. Igor Koshin, who came second in 2005 race, was elected new governor of the Okrug. Five months later the Assembly of Deputies decided to returh back to 2005–2012 scheme, in which instead of direct elections, the governor is endowed with powers by the Assembly. Deputies choose from three candidates proposed by the President of Russia. But now the governor of Arkhangelsk Oblast also takes participation in the formation of the list of candidates for governor of NAO. As speaker Anatoly Myandin said, "the abolition of direct elections for the governor and the transition to a new system will strengthen relations between the two regions." (Note: Federal legislation allows the Autonomous Okrug to be a subject of the Federation and a constituent part of a larger subject simultaneously. Chukotka Autonomous Okrug seceded from Magadan Oblast in 1992, while Nenets, Khanty-Mansi and Yamalo-Nenets AOs remained to varying degrees dependent on the oblasts they were part of since the Soviet era.)

== List of office-holders ==
No.	Portrait	Governor	Tenure	Time in office	Party	Election
1		Yury Komarovsky (born 1952)	30 November 1991 – 22 February 1996 (resigned)	4 years, 84 days	Independent	Appointed
2		Vladimir Khabarov (1951–2010)	21 March 1996 – 25 December 1996 (lost election)	279 days	Independent	Appointed
3		Vladimir Butov (born 1958)	25 December 1996 – 17 February 2005 (term-limited)	8 years, 54 days	Independent	1996; 2001
4		Alexey Barinov (born 1951)	17 February 2005 – 2 June 2006 (removed)	1 year, 105 days	Independent	2005
—		Aleksandr Sharenkov	23 May 2006 – 2 June 2006	10 days	Independent	Acting for Barinov
—		Valery Potapenko (born 1958)	2 June 2006 – 7 August 2006	2 years, 259 days	Independent	Acting
5		Valery Potapenko (born 1958)	7 August 2006 – 16 February 2009	2 years, 259 days	Independent	2006 (Note: Appointed by the president of Russia with the consent of the Assembly of Deputies)
—		Igor Fyodorov (born 1964)	16 February 2009 – 24 February 2009	5 years, 6 days	United Russia	Acting
6		Igor Fyodorov (born 1964)	24 February 2009 – 22 February 2014 (term end)	5 years, 6 days	United Russia	2009
—		Igor Koshin (born 1974)	22 February 2014 – 20 September 2014	3 years, 218 days	United Russia	Acting
7		Igor Koshin (born 1974)	20 September 2014 – 28 September 2017 (resigned)	3 years, 218 days	United Russia	2014
—		Alexander Tsybulsky (born 1979)	28 September 2017 – 1 October 2018	2 years, 187 days	United Russia	Acting
8		Alexander Tsybulsky (born 1979)	1 October 2018 – 2 April 2020 (resigned)	2 years, 187 days	United Russia	2018 (Note: Indirect election)
—		Yury Bezdudny (born 1969)	2 April 2020 – 13 September 2020	4 years, 350 days	United Russia	Acting
9		Yury Bezdudny (born 1969)	13 September 2020 – 18 March 2025 (resigned)	4 years, 350 days	United Russia	2020
—		Irina Gecht (born 1969)	18 March 2025 – 23 September 2025	1 year, 211 days	United Russia	Acting
10		Irina Gecht (born 1969)	23 September 2025 – present	1 year, 211 days	United Russia	2025
