= Denis Gusev (politician) =

Russian politician (born 1976)

- Денис Гусев
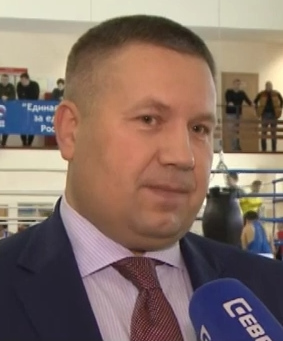
- Gusev in 2018

Russian Federation Senator from the Nenets Autonomous Okrug
- Incumbent
- Assumed office 14 September 2020
- Preceded by: Olga Starostina

Member of the Naryan-Mar City Counci
- In office 8 September 2019 – 14 September 2020

Member of the Arkhangelsk Regional Assembly of Deputies
- In office September 2013 – 8 September 2019

Personal details
- Born: Denis Vladimirovich Gusev; 26 December 1976 (age 48) Arkhangelsk, Russian SFSR, Soviet Union
- Political party: United Russia

Denis Vladimirovich Gusev (Russian: Денис Владимирович Гусев; born on 26 December 1976), is a Russian politician who is currently the senator of the executive authority of the Nenets Autonomous Okrug since 14 September 2020.

He was also the secretary of the Nenets regional branch of the United Russia party from 2016 to 2021.

Since 3 October 2019, he has also been the Chairman of the City Council of Naryan-Mar.

On 9 March 2022, he has been under personal EU sanctions.

== Biography ==
Denis Gusev was born in Arkhangelsk on 26 December 1976.

Gusev has been a boxing champion of the Arkhangelsk Oblast in 1995. In 1999, he graduated from the Pomor State University with a degree in history and socio-political disciplines.

From 1999 to 2000 he served in the Arkhangelsk customs.

Between 2000 and October 2019, he worked in subsidiaries of LUKOIL in Naryan-Mar.

In 2004, Gusev established the Boxing Federation of the Nenets Autonomous Okrug, until 2019 he was its leader.

In 2012, he was vacated after the transfer of Natalia Kardakova to the Assembly of Deputies of the Nenets Autonomous Okrug, the place of the deputy of the Council of the Zapolyarny region of the second convocation.

In September 2013, he was elected a member of the Arkhangelsk Regional Assembly of Deputies of the sixth convocation.

In 2014, he received his second higher education at the Northern (Arctic) Federal University with a degree in engineering.

From 7 October 2015 to 2 February 2016, he was the secretary of the local branch of the United Russia party, the Municipal District City of Naryan-Mar. On 23 December 2016, at the XXII Regional Conference, Gusev was elected secretary of the Nenets regional branch of the United Russia party.

On 8 September 2019, he was elected a member of the Naryan-Mar City Council of the fourth convocation in constituency No. 6 (“Portovy”). On 3 October 2019, at the first organizational session of the City Council, he was elected its chairman.

On 14 September 2020, Gusev became the senator of the executive authority of the Nenets Autonomous Okrug.

== Family ==
He is married, and has three children.
