= Roman Lyabikhov =

Russian politician

Roman Lyabikhov MP
- Роман Лябихов
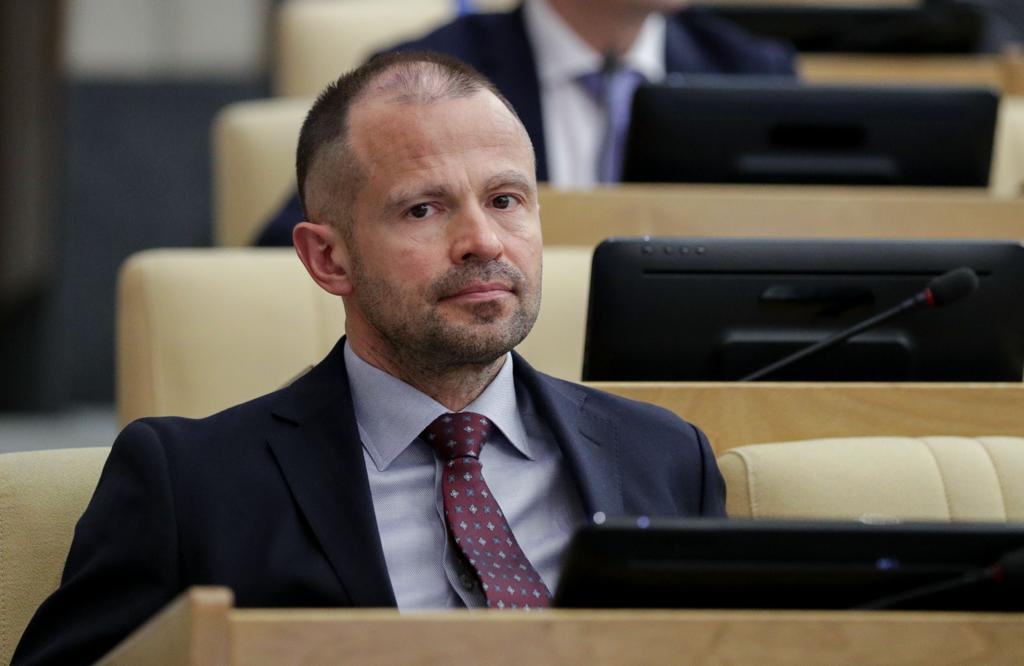
- Lyabikhov in 2021

Member of the State Duma (Party List Seat)
- Incumbent
- Assumed office 5 November 2020
- Preceded by: Alexander Nekrasov

Personal details
- Born: 7 May 1973 (age 53) Severodvinsk, Arkhangelsk Oblast, Russian SFSR, USSR
- Party: Communist Party of the Russian Federation
- Education: Saint Petersburg State Marine Technical University
- Website: lyabikhov.ru (in Russian)

Roman Mikhailovich Lyabikhov (Russian: Роман Михайлович Лябихов; born 7 May 1973, Severodvinsk, Arkhangelsk Oblast) is a Russian political figure and a deputy of the 7th and 8th State Duma.

From 1995 to 2013, Lyabikhov served as a director of several industrial enterprises in Severodvinsk, including Arnika LLC, Arsenal NPF, Plant of Chemical Reagents LLC NPO. From 2013 to 2017, he was the general director of Management Company Leader Group. He ran for the State Duma in 2016, but did not receive a mandate. On 9 October 2020, Deputy Alexander Nekrasov was appointed to the Federation Council, resigning his Duma mandate on 14 October 2020. Lyabikhov replaced him in the State Duma on 5 November 2020. Since September 2021, he has served as a deputy of the 8th State Duma.

== Sanctions ==
He was sanctioned by the UK government in 2022 in relation to the Russo-Ukrainian War.
