= Irina Gecht =

Russian politician

- Ирина Гехт
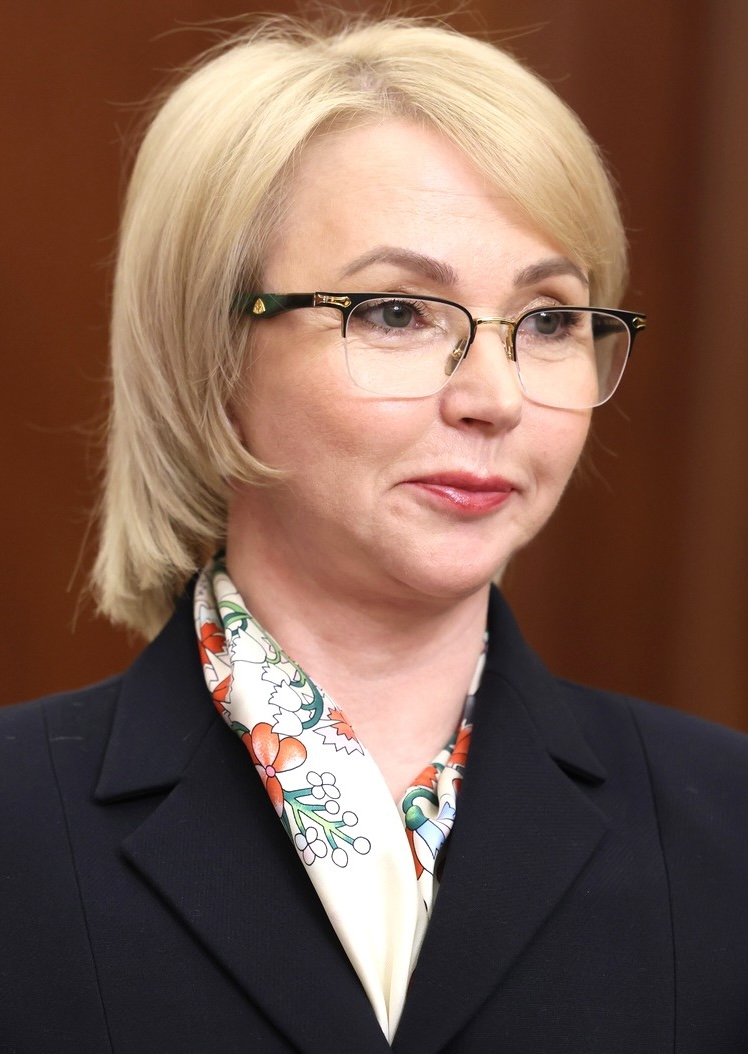
- Gecht in 2025

10th Governor of Nenets Autonomous Okrug
- Incumbent
- Assumed office 25 September 2025; Acting: 18 March – 25 September 2025
- Preceded by: Yury Bezdudny

Chair of Government of Zaporizhzhia Oblast
- In office 8 May 2024 – 15 January 2025
- Governor: Yevgeny Balitsky
- Preceded by: Anton Koltsov
- Succeeded by: Office disestablished

First Deputy Governor of Chelyabinsk Oblast
- In office 11 July 2019 – 8 May 2024
- Governor: Aleksey Teksler
- Preceded by: Yevgeny Redin
- Succeeded by: Ivan Kutsevlyak

Senator from Chelyabinsk Oblast
- In office 24 September 2014 – 10 July 2019
- Preceded by: Ruslan Gattarov
- Succeeded by: Margarita Pavlova

Personal details
- Born: November 30, 1969 (age 56) Shchuchye, Kurgan Oblast, Russian SFSR, Soviet Union
- Party: United Russia
- Children: 2
- Education: Chelyabinsk State University (1992)
- Profession: Educator, historian, politician

Irina Alfredovna Gecht (Russian: Ирина Альфредовна Гехт; born 30 November 1969) is a Russian politician serving as Governor of Nenets Autonomous Okrug since September 2025. A member of the United Russia political party, she has served as First Deputy Governor of Chelyabinsk Oblast from 2019 to 2024 and previously as Russian Federation Senator from Chelyabinsk Oblast from 2014 to 2019.

== Biography ==
Irina Gecht was born in the town of Shchuchye, Shchuchansky District, Kurgan Oblast, to a Volga German family. In the 1980s, the Gecht family moved permanently to the town of Raduzhny, Khanty-Mansi Autonomous Okrug. After school, Gecht entered Chelyabinsk State University, History Department. She specialized in the history of the Communist Party of the Soviet Union. In 1998, she completed postgraduate studies at the same university.

Gecht began her political career in 2005 when she was appointed a member of the Civiс Chamber of the Chelyabinsk Region. In 2009, she was elected as Deputy Chair of the Chamber. At the time, she worked as a senior lecturer at the Social Work Department at Chelyabinsk State University.

In 2009, Gecht ran as a candidate for the A Just Russia party in the Chelyabinsk City Duma (local representative body), but was not elected. At the same year she completed and defended her thesis at South Ural State University and received a doctorate in pedagogy.

After the election of Mikhail Yurevich as Chelyabinsk Governor in 2010, he appointed Gecht as Deputy Minister for Social Relations of the Region. In 2011, he promoted her to Minister for Social Relations. In 2012, the Governor appointed her Deputy Governor for Social Affairs.

In 2014, a newly elected Governor Boris Dubrovsky appointed Gecht Senator from Chelyabinsk Oblast. In the Federation Council she joined the Committee for Agrarian and Food Policy and Environmental Management and became its deputy chair.

In July 2019, Irina Gecht resigned early as Senator. She became First Deputy Governor of Chelyabinsk Oblast under incoming Governor Aleksey Teksler.

From May 2024 to January 2025, she chaired the Government of Zaporizhzhia Oblast. From January to March 2025 she served as Presidential Envoy to the Northwestern Federal District Aleksandr Gutsan's deputy.

On March 18, 2025 President Vladimir Putin appointed Irina Gecht acting Governor of Nenets Autonomous Okrug, following Governor Yury Bezdudny's early resignation.
