= Assembly of Deputies of the Nenets Autonomous Okrug =

Regional parliament of the Nenets Autonomous Okrug, Russia

Assembly of Deputies of the Nenets Autonomous Okrug Собрание депутатов Ненецкого автономного округа (Russian) Ненэцие” харто’ илмда мэта” (автономной) округ’ депутат” Собрания (Nenets)
- 29th legislature

Type
- Type: Unicameral

History
- Founded: 1994

Leadership
- Chairman: Aleksandr Chursinov, United Russia since 2023

Structure
- Seats: 19
- Political groups: United Russia (13); CPRF (3); LDPR (1); CPCR (1); Rodina (1)
- Length of term: 5 years

Elections
- Last election: 2023
- Next election: 2028

Meeting place
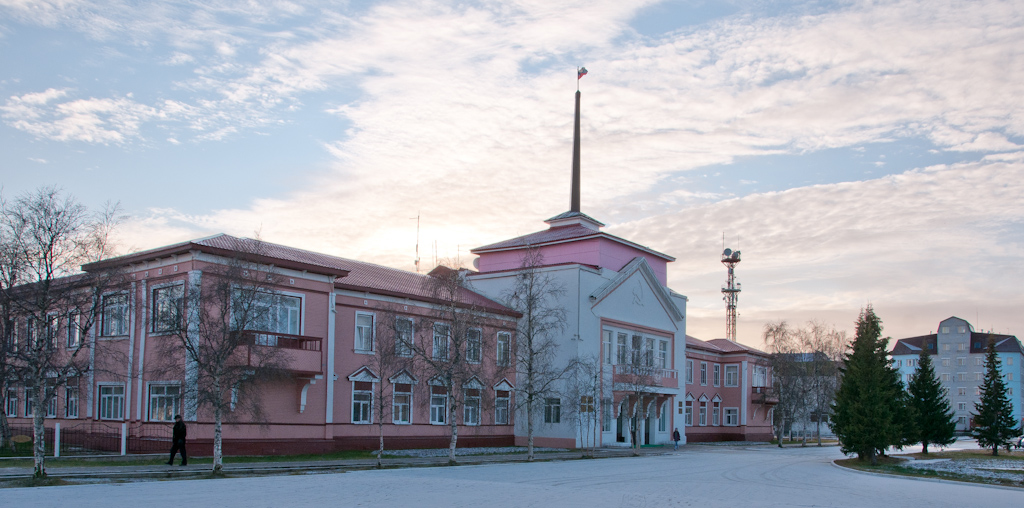
- 20 Smidovich Street, Naryan-Mar

Website
- www.sdnao.ru

The Assembly of Deputies of the Nenets Autonomous Okrug (Russian: Собрание депутатов Ненецкого автономного округа; Nenets: Ненэцие” харто’ илмда мэта” (автономной) округ’ депутат” Собрания) is the regional parliament of the Nenets Autonomous Okrug, a federal subject of Russia. It consists of 19 deputies who are elected for five-year terms.

Unlike other regional parliaments of Russia, the Assembly of Deputies claims succession from the Soviet-era Council of People's Deputies. As a result, the current 8th sitting of the Assembly is known as the 29th Assembly.

== Powers ==
- Adopts and amends the Charter of the Nenets Autonomous Okrug (regional constitution)
- Carries out legislative regulation of subjects of jurisdiction of the Nenets Autonomous Okrug and subjects of joint jurisdiction of the Russian Federation and the Nenets Autonomous Okrug within its powers
- Hears annual reports of the governor about the activities of the administration
- Exercise other powers established by the Constitution, federal laws, the Charter and laws of the Nenets Autonomous Okrug.

== Elections ==
=== 2018 ===
Party	%	Seats
United Russia	38.97	11
Communist Party of the Russian Federation	23.80	3
Liberal Democratic Party of Russia	17.36	2
Rodina	5.54	1
A Just Russia	5.41	1
Communists of Russia	5.29	1
Registered voters/turnout	35.90	

=== 2023 ===
Party	%	Seats
United Russia	43.94	13
Communist Party of the Russian Federation	24.76	3
Liberal Democratic Party of Russia	9.93	1
Rodina	5.67	1
Communists of Russia	5.71	1
A Just Russia	4.51	0
Registered voters/turnout	37.65	
