= Alexander Tsybulsky =

Russian politician

- Александр Цыбульский
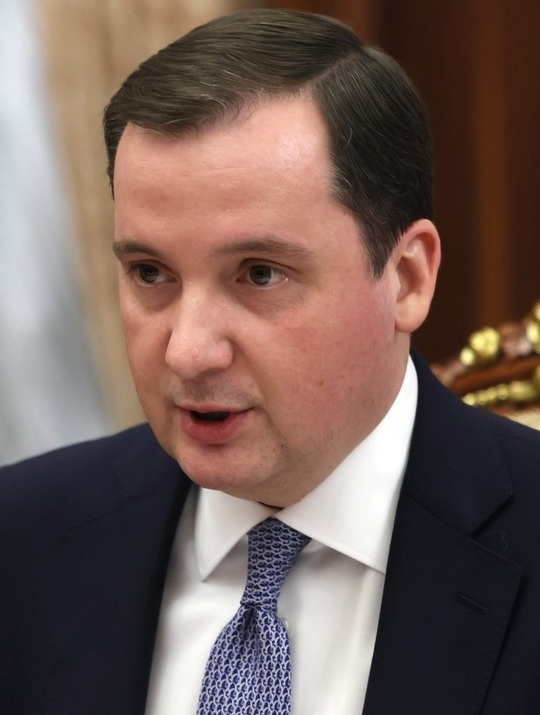
- Tsybulsky in 2025

6th Governor of Arkhangelsk Oblast
- Incumbent
- Assumed office 2 April 2020
- Preceded by: Igor Orlov

8th Governor of Nenets Autonomous Okrug
- In office 1 October 2018 – 2 April 2020 (acting from 29 September 2017)
- President: Vladimir Putin
- Preceded by: Igor Koshin
- Succeeded by: Yury Bezdudny

Personal details
- Born: Alexander Vitalyevich Tsybulsky; 15 July 1979 (age 47) Moscow, Russian SFSR, Soviet Union
- Party: United Russia
- Education: Russian Presidential Academy of National Economy and Public Administration

Alexander Vitalyevich Tsybulsky (Russian: Александр Витальевич Цыбульский; born 15 July 1979) is a Russian politician, economist, and former military officer who is currently the 6th Governor of Arkhangelsk Oblast. From 2017 to 2020, he was the governor of Nenets Autonomous Okrug.

== Biography ==
Alexander Tsybulsky was born in Moscow on 15 July 1979. In 2001 he graduated from the Military University of the Ministry of Defense. From 1996 to 2005, he served in the Russian Armed Forces. In 2006 he graduated from the Moscow Institute of International Business. Since 2006, he worked in the department of foreign economic relations of the Ministry of Economic Development of Russia. In the period from 2008 to 2010 he was an assistant to the Minister of Regional Development, Viktor Basargin. From 2010 to 2011 he was the deputy director, and in 2011–2013, the Director of the Department of International Relations and Development of Cross-Border Cooperation of the Ministry of Regional Development. From January to March 2013, Director of the Department for Coordination of State Sector Programs. In March 2013, he moved to the Ministry of Economic Development, to the post of assistant head of the department, Andrey Belousov. Since June 2013, he became an assistant to the new minister, Alexei Ulyukayev. From September to December 2013, he became the Director of the Department of the activities of the head of the Ministry of Economic Development. On November 19, 2014, Aleksandr Tsybulsky was appointed Deputy Minister of Economic Development for Alexey Ulyukaev. But after the arrest of Ulyukayev and his resignation in connection with the loss of the president's confidence, on November 30, 2016, he was appointed Deputy Head of the Ministry of Economic Development, under Maxim Oreshkin.

In 2014, he studied at the Presidential Academy of National Economy and Public Administration under the Master of Business Administration program. Actual state adviser of the Russian Federation of II class. He speaks English, Greek and French. In 2015 he was awarded the medal "For Merit to the Fatherland" of the second class.

On September 28, 2017, he was appointed acting governor of the Nenets Autonomous Okrug, when Igor Koshin decided to leave the post. He was formally elected as governor on 1 October 2018.

On 2 April 2020, he resigned as governor of the Nenets Autonomous Okrug and was appointed acting governor of Arkhangelsk Oblast by Russian president Vladimir Putin. On 13 September 2020 he was elected governor of Arkhangelsk Oblast and took office on 8 October. He was reelected in 2025.

=== Sanctions ===
He was sanctioned by the UK government in 2022 in relation to the Russo-Ukrainian War.
