= Nenets Autonomous Okrug =

First-level administrative division of Russia

Nenets Autonomous Okrug Ненецкий автономный округ (Russian)
- Autonomous okrug

Other transcription(s)
  - Nenets: Ненэцие" автономной округ’
- Flag Coat of arms
- Anthem: Anthem of Nenets Autonomous Okrug
- Coordinates: 68°50′N 54°50′E
- Country: Russia
- Federal district: Northwestern
- Economic region: Northern
- Established: July 15, 1929
- Capital: Naryan-Mar

Government
  - Body: Assembly of Deputies
  - Governor: Irina Gecht

Area
  - Total: 176,810 km^{2} (68,270 sq mi)
  - Rank: 20th

Population (2021 census)
  - Total: 41,434
  - Estimate (2018): 43,997
  - Rank: 83rd
  - Density: 0.23434/km^{2} (0.60694/sq mi)
  - Urban: 74%
  - Rural: 26%

GDP (nominal, 2024)
  - Total: ₽599 billion (US$7.03 billion)
  - Per capita: ₽14.25 million (US$167,221.95)
- Time zone: UTC+3 (MSK)
- ISO 3166 code: RU-NEN
- License plates: 83
- OKTMO ID: 11800000
- Official languages: Russian
- Recognised languages: Nenets
- Website: http://www.adm-nao.ru/

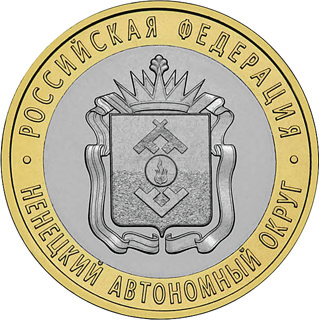
Commemorative coin of the Bank of Russia with a face value of 10 rubles (2010)

The Nenets Autonomous Okrug (Russian: Не́нецкий автоно́мный о́круг; Nenets: Ненэцие" автономной округ’, romanized: Nyeneciye” awtonomnoy okruk’), also known as Nenetsia (Russian: Нене́ция [nʲɪˈnʲet͡sɨjə]), is a federal subject of Russia and an autonomous okrug of Arkhangelsk Oblast. Its administrative center is the town of Naryan-Mar. It has an area of 176,700 square kilometers (68,200 sq mi) and a population of 42,090 as of the 2010 Census, making it the least populous federal subject. It is the only federal subject of Russia that is divided into only one district.

A plan to merge the autonomous okrug with Arkhangelsk Oblast was presented by the governors of both federal subjects on 13 May 2020, with a referendum planned for September, but was met with opposition by locals, leading to the merger process being scrapped completely.

== Geography ==
The arctic ecology of this area has a number of unique features derived from the extreme temperatures and unique geologic province. Polar bears are found in this locale; in fact, the sub-population found here is a genetically distinct taxon associated with the Barents Sea region. The autonomous okrug has a size of approximately 177,000 km^{2}. The district is around 320 km from north to south and around 950 km from east to west, stretching from Mys Bolvansky Nos in the north to the source of the Oma River in the south and Cape Kanin Nos in the west to the banks of the Kara River in the east.

The okrug has a number of peninsulas – from west to east these are: Kanin Peninsula, Svyatoy Nos Peninsula, Russkiy Zavorot Peninsula and the Yugorsky Peninsula. There are a number of islands off the Nenets coast – from west to east the most important are Kolguyev Island, Sengeyskiy Island, Dolgiy Island, the Gulyayevskiye Koshki Islands, Lovetskiy Island, Pesyakov Island, Dolgy Island, Bolshoy Zelenets Island, Vaygach Island, Oleniy Island and Mestnyy Island. Of these, Kolguyev and Vaygach are by far the largest, being the 119th and 156th largest islands in the world.

== Administrative divisions ==
The okrug is administratively divided into one district (Zapolyarny District) and one town of okrug significance (Naryan-Mar). The district is further divided into selsoviets. Municipally, the town of Naryan-Mar is incorporated as Naryan-Mar Urban Okrug, while the district (including the settlement of Kharuta, which geographically is an exclave surrounded by the territory of the Komi Republic) is incorporated as Zapolyarny Municipal District.

== Politics ==
=== Deputies in the State Duma ===
- Artur Chilingarov – Deputy of the State Duma of the Federal Assembly of Russia of the I, II, III, IV, and V convocations (from 1993 to 2011) in the Nenets single-mandate constituency No. 218.
- Vladimir Pekhtin – Deputy of the State Duma of the Federal Assembly of Russia of the VI convocation (from 2011 to 2013), elected on the regional list of the United Russia party. On 20 February 2013, Pekhtin voluntarily resigned as a deputy of the State Duma in connection with allegations of concealing income and real estate.
- Elena Vtorygina – Deputy of the State Duma of the Federal Assembly of Russia of the VI convocation (since April 3, 2013). Elected on the regional list of the United Russia party.
- Irina Chirkova – Deputy of the State Duma of the Federal Assembly of Russia of the VI convocation (in 2011 she was elected on the regional list of Liberal Democratic Party of Russia.
- Sergey Kotkin – Deputy of the State Duma of the Federal Assembly of Russia of the VII convocation in the Nenets single-mandate constituency No. 221.

=== Deputies in the Federal Council ===
- Denis Gusev
- Aleksandr Lutovinov – Serves on the Federation Council Committee on Rules and Parliamentary activities.

== History ==
=== Early history ===
The first recorded mention of the Nenets people is found in the 11th-century Primary Chronicle, a chronicle of Kievan Rus' from about 850 to 1110, originally compiled in Kiev about 1113 by Nestor the Chronicler. At the time, Kievan Rus was under the influence of Novgorod, as was the whole of the North Eastern territories of Kievan Rus'. By the end of the fifteenth century, Novgorod's influence was waning and the area fell under the control of Muscovy and in 1499, they established, Pustozyorsk (Russian: Пустозёрск, literally meaning deserted lakes), and it became a military, commercial, cultural and administrative hub for the area.

By the 18th century, the area was part of Mezensky Uyezd. In 1891, Pechorsky Uyezd was established and in 1896, so was Neskaya Volost. Prior to the formation of the autonomous okrug, this area belonged in part to Mezensky Uyezd in Arkhangelsk Oblast and partly to Izhmo-Pechorsky Uyezd in Komi (Zyriansky) Oblast.

=== Soviet history ===
The area now known as Nenets Autonomous Okrug was officially created on July 15, 1929, and at that time included Kanino-Timansky District, Peshsky and Omsky Selsoviets, Mezenskaya Volost and Mezensky Uyezd, Telvisochno-Samoyedsky District, Pechorsky Uyezd, and Izhmo-Pechorsky Uyezd of Komi-Zyryan Autonomous Oblast. At this time, two administrative districts, Canino-Timansky and Bolshezemelsky were founded. In December 1929, further additions were made to the District's area, namely Pustozyorskaya Volost, Pechora District and a number of offshore islands. In 1934, a number of islands, including Vaygach Island were subsumed into the district. Naryan-Mar was elevated to town status in 1935. In July 1940, a third administrative district was formed, Amderminsky, with its administrative headquarters in Amderma. However, on November 23, 1959, all administrative districts were abolished and a number of areas, including the administrative area for Vorkuta, were transferred to the jurisdiction of the Komi Republic and the region took the shape that it still holds today.

=== Recent history ===
Zapolyarny Municipal District, one of the youngest districts in Russia, was formed in 2006. Zapolyarny translates as "beyond the polar [circle]", and the district was given this name because the vast majority of the district's area lies north of the arctic circle.

== Demographics ==
Historical population
Year	Pop.	±%
1926	12,200	—
1929	13,670	+12.0%
1931	14,983	+9.6%
1939	46,200	+208.3%
1959	40,825	−11.6%
1970	39,119	−4.2%
1979	47,001	+20.1%
1987	54,000	+14.9%
1989	54,840	+1.6%
2002	41,546	−24.2%
2010	42,090	+1.3%
2021	41,434	−1.6%
Source: Census data

Population: 42,090 (2010 census); 41,546 (2002 census); 54,840 (1989 Soviet census).

=== Vital statistics ===
Source: Russian Federal State Statistics Service

	Average population (x 1000)	Live births	Deaths	Natural change	Crude birth rate (per 1000)	Crude death rate (per 1000)	Natural change (per 1000)	Total fertility rate
1970	40	800	295	505	20.0	7.4	12.6	
1975	44	894	389	505	20.3	8.8	11.5	
1980	48	941	387	554	19.6	8.1	11.5	
1985	53	1 049	371	678	19.8	7.0	12.8	
1990	52	917	386	531	17.7	7.4	10.2	
1991	51	852	376	476	16.7	7.4	9.3	
1992	49	725	431	294	14.7	8.8	6.0	
1993	47	588	531	57	12.4	11.2	1.2	
1994	46	653	528	125	14.3	11.6	2.7	
1995	44	602	570	32	13.7	13.0	0.7	
1996	43	536	481	55	12.5	11.2	1.3	
1997	42	546	427	119	13.0	10.1	2.8	
1998	42	567	435	132	13.6	10.4	3.2	
1999	41	518	433	85	12.5	10.5	2.1	
2000	41	541	531	10	13.2	12.9	0.2	
2001	41	598	560	38	14.6	13.7	0.9	
2002	41	606	540	66	14.7	13.1	1.6	
2003	42	665	590	75	15.9	14.1	1.8	
2004	42	595	519	76	14.3	12.4	1.8	1.81
2005	42	607	513	94	14.6	12.3	2.3	1.81
2006	42	587	540	47	14.1	12.9	1.1	1.71
2007	42	653	528	125	15.6	12.7	3.0	1.88
2008	42	691	537	154	16.5	12.8	3.7	2.02
2009	42	695	495	200	16.6	11.8	4.8	2.05
2010	42	699	500	199	16.6	11.9	4.7	2.11

=== Ethnic groups ===
According to the 2021 Census, the ethnic composition was:

- Russians: 69.6%
- Nenets: 18%
- Komi: 6.5%
- Others: 5.9%

Historical figures are given below:

Ethnic group	1939 Census		1959 Census		1970 Census		1979 Census		1989 Census		2002 Census		2010 Census^{1}		2021 Census	
Ethnic group	Number	%	Number	%	Number	%	Number	%	Number	%	Number	%	Number	%	Number	%
Nenets	5,602	11.8%	4,957	10.9%	5,851	15.0%	6,031	12.8%	6,423	11.9%	7,754	18.7%	7,504	18.6%	6,713	18.0%
Komi	6,003	12.6%	5,012	11.0%	5,359	13.7%	5,160	10.9%	5,124	9.5%	4,510	10.9%	3,623	9.0%	2,431	6.5%
Russians	32,146	67.5%	31,312	68.8%	25,225	64.5%	31,067	65.8%	35,489	65.8%	25,942	62.4%	26,648	66.1%	26,021	69.6%
Others	3,866	8.1%	4,253	9.3%	2,684	6.9%	4,960	10.5%	6,876	12.8%	3,340	8.0%	2,524	6.3%	2,238	5.9%
^{1} 1,791 people were registered from administrative databases, and could not declare an ethnicity. It is estimated that the proportion of ethnicities in this group is the same as that of the declared group.

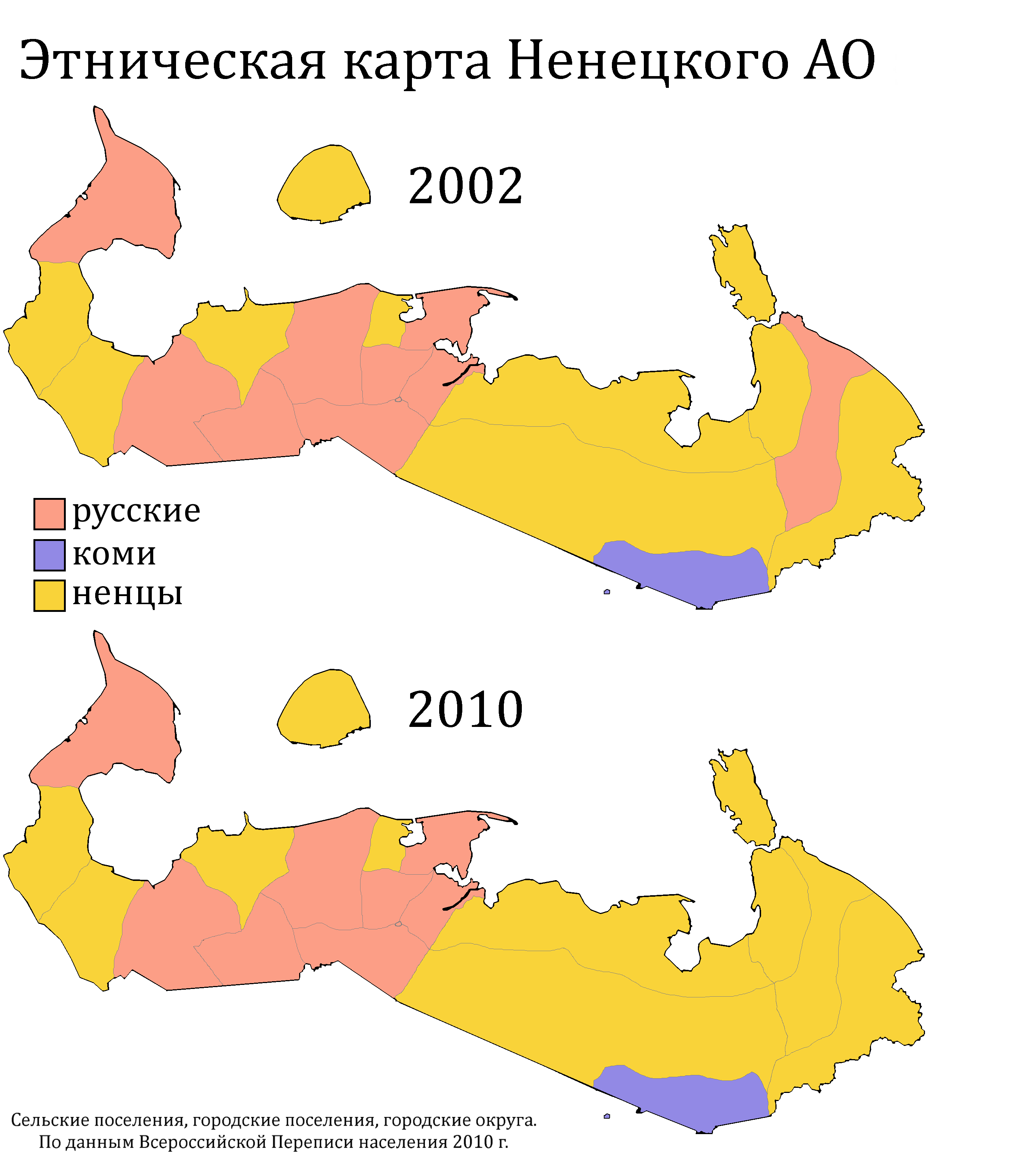
Ethnic map of the Nenets Autonomous Okrug by urban and rural settlements, 2002 and 2010 censuses Russians Komi Nenets

Ethnographic maps shows the Nenets living throughout the Okrug, with the east-central section of the okrug, along the Komi Republic border, showing mixed Nenets-Komi population.

== Economy ==
=== Oil and gas ===
The economy of Zapolyarny district is dominated by oil and gas, constituting around 99% of all industrial activity within the whole Okrug. In 2021, 99.9% of all exports from the Okrug were of crude petroleum, with the remaining 0.01% comprising fresh fish. The dominance of oil and gas exploration within the Okrug has seen associated revenues increase dramatically, with €190 million generated in 2007 compared to only €6.7 million ten years prior, with fuel industry's share of the districts GRP increasing from 65% in 2001 to 80% in 2005. This increase in revenue has resulted from a marked increase in investment in the area by the parent companies of the concerns operating in the District, such as Rosneft, Lukoil, Total, Surgutneftegas and TNK-BP, whose input equates to approximately 90% of the total annual investment in the district. This investment has included the construction of an oil terminal in the Barents Sea at a cost of approximately €700 million by an independent company especially created to oversee the construction and administration of the terminal, a pipeline to connect the terminal to the ZPS Southern Khylchuyu oilfields at a cost of around €250 million, the completion of the Kharyaga-Indiga pipeline and a gas plant near Khumzha. This allows the transportation of oil and gas throughout the region and into the general Russian pipeline network. There are currently more than 80 separate oil and gas sites of exploration, and it is estimated that there is around 5 billion tons of oil and around 500 billion cubic meters of gas in the district.

In the first quarter of 2009, industrial production grew by 34.7% compared with the same period last year However, investments in industrial and housing construction decreased by 60.6% and 90.9% respectively, in the first three months of 2009, oil production totaled 4,419 million tons, an increase of over 35% on the same period in the previous year

=== Infrastructure ===
As a result of the significant and speedy increase in investment in the area, the district is faced with a widespread infrastructure problem meaning that progress at many of the oil and gas exploration sites is hampered by accessibility issues, compounded by the severe arctic climate of the district. The Duma of Nenets Autonomous Okrug has stated their intention to address this issue as a priority, including the construction of the third phase of the Naryan-Mar-Usinsk road, construction of a Naryan-Mar-Telviska-Velikovisochnoye pipeline and a renovation of the wastewater treatment system in Iskateley.

Further plans by Russian railways include the construction of two railways linking settlements in Zapolyarny Municipal District, one, a line running 210 km from Vorkuta, in the Komi Republic, to Ust-Kara in the far east of the district, and another running from Sosnogorsk, also in the Komi Republic, to Indiga in the west of the district. Officials have also proposed that the line to Ust-Kara be extended to Amderma to provide adequate transportation routes to allow the economic extraction of several mineral deposits, with an estimated worth of between €100–135 billion.

Without this investment in infrastructure, the main means of transportation is air, with regular flights to Moscow, Saint Petersburg, Arkangelsk and Usa. In the summer, the main river in the district, the Pechora is used to transport freight.

=== Indigenous economy ===
Reindeer husbandry is considered central to the Nenets' way of life, despite only 14% of Nenets people being involved in herding directly at the end of the twentieth century. There are three types of reindeer in the district: collective, personal and private. The majority of reindeer are owned by collective farms, with Nenets people employed to look after them. Those employed in such a capacity are then permitted to own additional personal reindeer, which do not require registration, nor a permit for grazing. The private reindeer are held by the association of reindeer herders, Erv, but these are very much the minority, with reports in 1997 indicating that over 70% of reindeer were held collectively, over 20% personally and only just over 2% privately.

The reindeer are kept, not only to provide for the families of the herders, but also to produce meat and antlers for sale. This meat is mainly sold within the district, since the price of reindeer meat has traditionally been lower than pork or beef, but there are other markets in the Komi Republic and Arkhangelsk Oblast. These outlets are used mainly by groups such as Erv, which have come into existence since the collapse of the Soviet Union. Those groups that effectively represent a continuity of the old collective farm economy, such as Vyucheiskiy and Kharp, generally continue to provide their reindeer to a slaughterhouse as they have always done, which results in lower profits than are generated through Erv's business plan, causing instability and debt amongst the collective farms though it is recognised that these collective farms do provide employment to those who would otherwise be without jobs.

There has been little significant change in the organisation of the reindeer herding enterprises between Soviet times and today, with little change in the number of businesses and those that continue to exist still practising the same business model, making changes only to the branding of the business.

== Sport ==
Governor Igor Koshin has had talks with the Russian Bandy Federation about developing bandy.

== See also ==
- Music in Nenets Autonomous Okrug
