= 2026 Bryansk Oblast gubernatorial election =

Regional legislative election in Russia

- 18–20 September 2026
- Turnout: 79.24% ▲21.09 pp
| | | CPRF | LDPR |
| Candidate | Yegor Kovalchuk | Andrey Arkhitsky | Ruslan Titov |
| Party | United Russia | CPRF | LDPR |
| Popular vote | 493,890 | 109,079 | 58,852 |
| Percentage | 67.52% | 14.91% | 8.05% |
Governor before election
Yegor Kovalchuk (acting)
United Russia
Governor-elect
Yegor Kovalchuk
United Russia
Senator before election
Vadim Dengin
LDPR
Senator after election
Sergey Melikov
United Russia

The 2026 Bryansk Oblast gubernatorial election took place on 18–20 September 2026, on common election day, to elect the Governor of Bryansk Oblast, coinciding with the 2026 Russian legislative election. Acting Governor Yegor Kovalchuk was elected for a full term in office.

== Background ==
Then-Member of State Duma Alexander Bogomaz was appointed acting Governor of Bryansk Oblast in September 2014, replacing two-term incumbent Nikolay Denin, who was dismissed by President of Russia Vladimir Putin after the governor became subject in a criminal case. Bogomaz easily won his first full term in 2015 with 79.96% of the vote, later getting re-elected with 71.69% (2020) and 78.78% (2025).

During Bogomaz's later terms Bryansk Oblast, which borders Ukraine, suffered from the consequences of the Russo-Ukrainian war, including numerous UAV attacks and missile strikes, Ukrainian incursions and sabotages, like those led to deadly 2025 Russia bridge collapses. In July 2025, just a couple of months before the gubernatorial election, Deputy Governor Nikolay Simonenko was arrested for embezzlement during fortifications construction, becoming the fourth Deputy Governor of Bryansk to be arrested in two years (joining Yelena Yegorova, Tatyana Kuleshova and Aleksandr Petrochenko).

In April 2026 Vedomosti reported that Alexander Bogomaz could resign as Governor of Bryansk Oblast despite easily winning re-election in September 2025. Among reasons for Bogomaz's potential resignation were named ongoing Ukrainian attacks and management crisis in the region. Sources named Aleksandr Sidyakin, State Duma member and United Russia central executive committee chairman, and Mikhail Kuznetsov, All-Russia People's Front executive committee head, as potential replacements for Bogomaz.

On May 13, 2026, President Putin accepted Bogomaz's resignation and appointed Prime Minister of Luhansk People's Republic Yegor Kovalchuk as acting Governor of Bryansk Oblast. The next day Bogomaz became Member of State Duma, receiving the seat of Ayrat Farrakhov on the United Russia party list.

== Candidates ==
In Bryansk Oblast candidates for Governor of Bryansk Oblast can be nominated only by registered political parties. Candidate for Governor of Bryansk Oblast should be a Russian citizen and at least 30 years old. Candidates for Governor of Bryansk Oblast should not have a foreign citizenship or residence permit. Each candidate in order to be registered is required to collect at least 7% of signatures of members and heads of municipalities. Also gubernatorial candidates present 3 candidacies to the Federation Council and election winner later appoints one of the presented candidates.

=== Declared candidates ===
| Candidate name, political party | Occupation | Status | Ref. |
|---|---|---|---|
| Andrey Arkhitsky; Communist Party | Member of Bryansk Oblast Duma (2009–2014, 2019–present); 2020 and 2025 gubernatorial candidate | Registered | |
| Aleksandra Kazachkova; New People | Individual entrepreneur | Registered | |
| Yegor Kovalchuk; United Russia | Acting Governor of Bryansk Oblast (2026–present); Former Prime Minister of Luhansk People's Republic (2024–2026) | Registered | |
| Aleksey Timoshkov; A Just Russia | Member of Bryansk Oblast Duma (2024–present); 2025 gubernatorial candidate | Registered | |
| Ruslan Titov; Liberal Democratic Party | Member of Dyatkovo City Council of People's Deputies (2024–present); Municipal park engineer | Registered | |

=== Candidates for Federation Council ===
Incumbent Senator Vadim Dengin (LDPR) was not renominated and unsuccessfully ran for State Duma.

| Gubernatorial candidate, political party | Candidates for Federation Council | Status |
|---|---|---|
| Andrey Arkhitsky; Communist Party | * Valery Bessmertny, Member of Klintsy City Council of People's Deputies (2014–present) * Yevgeny Luzan, individual entrepreneur * Timofey Sigayev, self-employed | Registered |
| Aleksandra Kazachkova; New People | * Sergey Gorelov, industrial businessman * Sergey Novikov, computer studies associate professor * Tatyana Romanova, manager | Registered |
| Yegor Kovalchuk; United Russia | * Andrey Frolenkov, acting Deputy Governor of Bryansk Oblast (2026–present), Hero of Russia (2022) * Sergey Melikov, former Head of the Republic of Dagestan (2020–2026), former Senator from Stavropol Krai (2019–2020) * Olga Polyakova, Member of Bryansk Oblast Duma (2019–present), oblast federation of unions chairwoman | Registered |
| Aleksey Timoshkov; A Just Russia | * Dmitry Krotov, individual entrepreneur * Yekaterina Milyutina, former Member of Snezhka Rural Council of People's Deputies (2009–2014), accountant * Irina Popova, former Member of Zhukovsky District Council of People's Deputies (2020–2025), accountant | Registered |
| Ruslan Titov; Liberal Democratic Party | * Maksim Ivanchenko, Member of Bryansk Oblast Duma (2019–present), businessman * Sergey Senin, Member of Bryansk City Council of People's Deputies (2019–present), municipal park director * Dmitry Simonov, Member of Bryansk City Council of People's Deputies (2024–present), businessman | Registered |

== Finances ==
All sums are in rubles.

| Financial Report | Source | Arkhitsky | Kazachkova | Kovalchuk | Timoshkov | Titov |
|---|---|---|---|---|---|---|
| First | | 150,000 | 120,000 | 250,000 | 140,000 | 150,000 |
| Final | | TBD | TBD | TBD | TBD | TBD |

== Results ==
Summary of the 18–20 September 2026 Bryansk Oblast gubernatorial election results
| Candidate | Party | Votes | % |
|---|---|---|---|
| Yegor Kovalchuk (incumbent) | United Russia | 493,890 | 67.52 |
| Andrey Arkhitsky | Communist Party | 109,079 | 14.91 |
| Ruslan Titov | Liberal Democratic Party | 58,852 | 8.05 |
| Aleksey Timoshkov | A Just Russia | 34,354 | 4.70 |
| Aleksandra Kazachkova | New People | 27,293 | 3.73 |
| Valid votes | | 723,468 | 98.90 |
| Blank ballots | | 8,030 | 1.10 |
| Total | | 731,498 | 100.00 |
| Turnout | | 731,498 | 79.24 |
| Registered voters | | 923,195 | 100.00 |

Governor Kovalchuk appointed former Head of the Republic of Dagestan Sergey Melikov (United Russia) to the Federation Council, replacing incumbent Senator Vadim Dengin (LDPR).

== See also ==
- 2026 Russian regional elections
