= Klimovo, Russia =

One of several places in Russia

Klimovo (Russian: Климово) is the name of several inhabited localities in Russia.

== Bryansk Oblast ==
As of 2010, one urban locality in Bryansk Oblast bears this name:

- Klimovo, Bryansk Oblast, a work settlement in Klimovsky District

== Chuvash Republic ==
As of 2010, one rural locality in the Chuvash Republic bears this name:

- Klimovo, Chuvash Republic, a selo in Klimovskoye Rural Settlement of Ibresinsky District

== Ivanovo Oblast ==
As of 2010, two rural localities in Ivanovo Oblast bear this name:

- Klimovo, Furmanovsky District, Ivanovo Oblast, a village in Furmanovsky District
- Klimovo, Privolzhsky District, Ivanovo Oblast, a village in Privolzhsky District

== Kostroma Oblast ==
As of 2010, two rural localities in Kostroma Oblast bear this name:

- Klimovo, Ostrovsky District, Kostroma Oblast, a village in Klevantsovskoye Settlement of Ostrovsky District
- Klimovo, Vokhomsky District, Kostroma Oblast, a village in Belkovskoye Settlement of Vokhomsky District

== Leningrad Oblast ==
As of 2010, three rural localities in Leningrad Oblast bear this name:

- Klimovo, Anisimovskoye Settlement Municipal Formation, Boksitogorsky District, Leningrad Oblast, a village in Anisimovskoye Settlement Municipal Formation of Boksitogorsky District
- Klimovo, Klimovskoye Settlement Municipal Formation, Boksitogorsky District, Leningrad Oblast, a village in Klimovskoye Settlement Municipal Formation of Boksitogorsky District
- Klimovo, Vyborgsky District, Leningrad Oblast, a logging depot settlement in Krasnoselskoye Settlement Municipal Formation of Vyborgsky District

== Lipetsk Oblast ==
As of 2010, one rural locality in Lipetsk Oblast bears this name:

- Klimovo, Lipetsk Oblast, a selo in Lomovskoy Selsoviet of Chaplyginsky District

== Moscow Oblast ==
As of 2010, four rural localities in Moscow Oblast bear this name:

- Klimovo, Ozyorsky District, Moscow Oblast, a village in Klishinskoye Rural Settlement of Ozyorsky District
- Klimovo, Sergiyevo-Posadsky District, Moscow Oblast, a village in Selkovskoye Rural Settlement of Sergiyevo-Posadsky District
- Klimovo, Solnechnogorsky District, Moscow Oblast, a village in Krivtsovskoye Rural Settlement of Solnechnogorsky District
- Klimovo, Taldomsky District, Moscow Oblast, a village in Kvashenkovskoye Rural Settlement of Taldomsky District

== Novgorod Oblast ==
As of 2010, two rural localities in Novgorod Oblast bear this name:

- Klimovo, Demyansky District, Novgorod Oblast, a village in Polnovskoye Settlement of Demyansky District
- Klimovo, Pestovsky District, Novgorod Oblast, a village in Pestovskoye Settlement of Pestovsky District

== Oryol Oblast ==
As of 2010, one rural locality in Oryol Oblast bears this name:

- Klimovo, Oryol Oblast, a selo in Gerasimovsky Selsoviet of Shablykinsky District

== Pskov Oblast ==
As of 2010, seven rural localities in Pskov Oblast bear this name:

- Klimovo (Bezhanitskaya Rural Settlement), Bezhanitsky District, Pskov Oblast, a village in Bezhanitsky District; municipally, a part of Bezhanitskaya Rural Settlement of that district
- Klimovo (Chikhachevskaya Rural Settlement), Bezhanitsky District, Pskov Oblast, a village in Bezhanitsky District; municipally, a part of Chikhachevskaya Rural Settlement of that district
- Klimovo, Novorzhevsky District, Pskov Oblast, a village in Novorzhevsky District
- Klimovo, Novosokolnichesky District, Pskov Oblast, a village in Novosokolnichesky District
- Klimovo, Porkhovsky District, Pskov Oblast, a village in Porkhovsky District
- Klimovo (Nosovskaya Rural Settlement), Pytalovsky District, Pskov Oblast, a village in Pytalovsky District; municipally, a part of Nosovskaya Rural Settlement of that district
- Klimovo (Vyshgorodskaya Rural Settlement), Pytalovsky District, Pskov Oblast, a village in Pytalovsky District; municipally, a part of Vyshgorodskaya Rural Settlement of that district

== Smolensk Oblast ==
As of 2010, two rural localities in Smolensk Oblast bear this name:

- Klimovo, Velizhsky District, Smolensk Oblast, a village in Seleznevskoye Rural Settlement of Velizhsky District
- Klimovo, Yartsevsky District, Smolensk Oblast, a village in Repinskoye Rural Settlement of Yartsevsky District

== Tver Oblast ==
As of 2010, nine rural localities in Tver Oblast bear this name:

- Klimovo, Likhoslavlsky District, Tver Oblast, a village in Likhoslavlsky District
- Klimovo (Sholokhovo Rural Settlement), Rzhevsky District, Tver Oblast, a village in Rzhevsky District; municipally, a part of Sholokhovo Rural Settlement of that district
- Klimovo (Itomlya Rural Settlement), Rzhevsky District, Tver Oblast, a village in Rzhevsky District; municipally, a part of Itomlya Rural Settlement of that district
- Klimovo, Spirovsky District, Tver Oblast, a village in Spirovsky District
- Klimovo (Staritskoye Rural Settlement), Staritsky District, Tver Oblast, a village in Staritsky District; municipally, a part of Staritskoye Rural Settlement of that district
- Klimovo (Stepurinskoye Rural Settlement), Staritsky District, Tver Oblast, a village in Staritsky District; municipally, a part of Stepurinskoye Rural Settlement of that district
- Klimovo (Bernovskoye Rural Settlement), Staritsky District, Tver Oblast, a village in Staritsky District; municipally, a part of Bernovskoye Rural Settlement of that district
- Klimovo (Arkhangelskoye Rural Settlement), Staritsky District, Tver Oblast, a village in Staritsky District; municipally, a part of Arkhangelskoye Rural Settlement of that district
- Klimovo, Torzhoksky District, Tver Oblast, a village in Torzhoksky District

== Vladimir Oblast ==
As of 2010, three rural localities in Vladimir Oblast bear this name:

- Klimovo, Kirzhachsky District, Vladimir Oblast, a village in Kirzhachsky District
- Klimovo, Kovrovsky District, Vladimir Oblast, a village in Kovrovsky District
- Klimovo, Muromsky District, Vladimir Oblast, a settlement in Muromsky District

== Vologda Oblast ==
As of 2010, six rural localities in Vologda Oblast bear this name:

- Klimovo, Cherepovetsky District, Vologda Oblast, a village in Malechkinsky Selsoviet of Cherepovetsky District
- Klimovo, Frolovsky Selsoviet, Gryazovetsky District, Vologda Oblast, a village in Frolovsky Selsoviet of Gryazovetsky District
- Klimovo, Pertsevsky Selsoviet, Gryazovetsky District, Vologda Oblast, a village in Pertsevsky Selsoviet of Gryazovetsky District
- Klimovo, Kichmengsko-Gorodetsky District, Vologda Oblast, a village in Sarayevsky Selsoviet of Kichmengsko-Gorodetsky District
- Klimovo, Tarnogsky District, Vologda Oblast, a village in Shevdenitsky Selsoviet of Tarnogsky District
- Klimovo, Velikoustyugsky District, Vologda Oblast, a village in Samotovinsky Selsoviet of Velikoustyugsky District

== Yaroslavl Oblast ==
As of 2010, four rural localities in Yaroslavl Oblast bear this name:

- Klimovo, Bolsheselsky District, Yaroslavl Oblast, a village in Blagoveshchensky Rural Okrug of Bolsheselsky District
- Klimovo, Myshkinsky District, Yaroslavl Oblast, a village in Bogorodsky Rural Okrug of Myshkinsky District
- Klimovo, Pereslavsky District, Yaroslavl Oblast, a village in Glebovsky Rural Okrug of Pereslavsky District
- Klimovo, Pervomaysky District, Yaroslavl Oblast, a village in Kolkinsky Rural Okrug of Pervomaysky District
