= 2024 Bryansk Oblast Duma election =

Regional election in Bryansk Oblast, Russia

- 6–8 September 2024

All 60 seats in the Oblast Duma 31 seats needed for a majority
- Turnout: 57.22% ▼1.23 pp
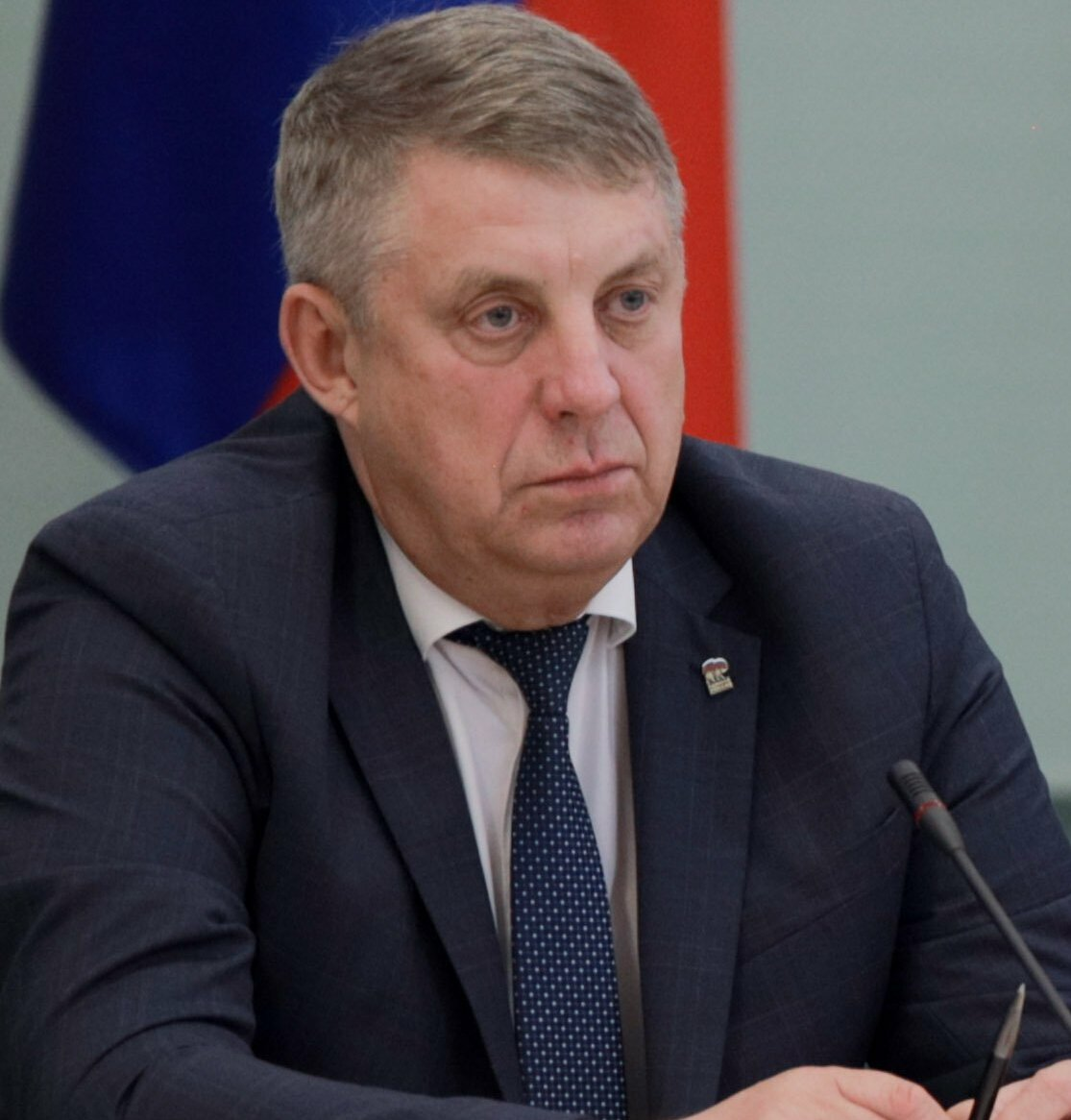

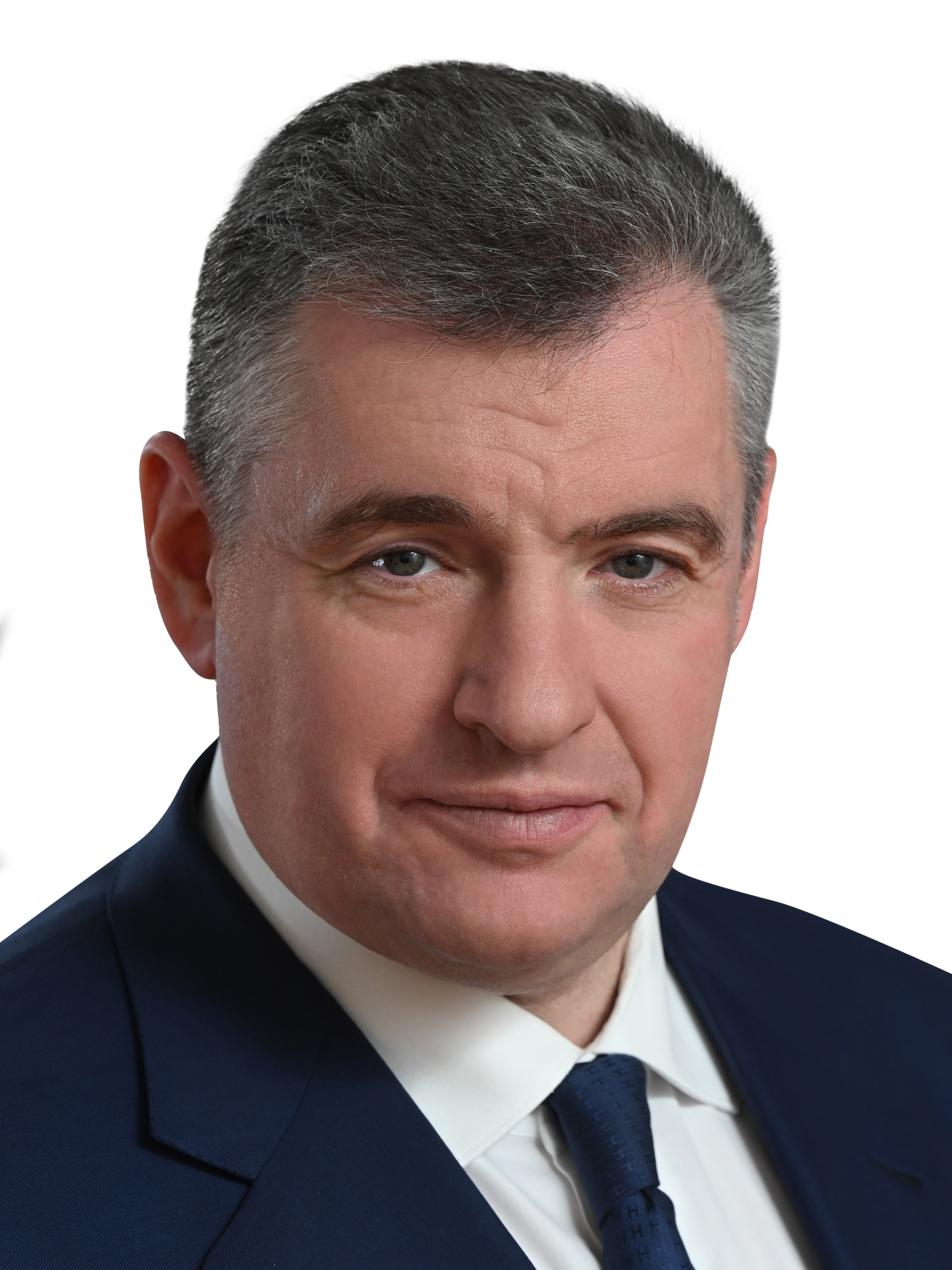
	Majority party	Minority party	Third party
			CPRF
Candidate	Aleksandr Bogomaz	Leonid Slutsky	Andrey Arkhitsky
Party	United Russia	LDPR	CPRF
Last election	63.71%, 48 seats	12.89%, 5 seats	12.27%, 4 seats
Seats won	51	5	2
Seat change	▲3	Steady	▼2
Popular vote	371,245	71,753	45,129
Percentage	68.69%	13.28%	8.35%
Swing	▲4.98 pp	▲0.39 pp	▼3.92 pp
	Fourth party	Fifth party	Sixth party
	SR-ZP	NL	CPCR
Candidate	Aleksey Timoshkov	Sergey Gorelov	Ilya Kleymyonov
Party	SR-ZP	New People	Communists of Russia
Last election	5.12%, 2 seats	Did not exist	Failed to qualify
Seats won	1	0	0
Seat change	▼1	Did not exist	Failed to qualify
Popular vote	18,976	13,298	7,632
Percentage	3.51%	2.46%	1.41%
Swing	▼1.61 pp	Did not exist	Failed to qualify
Chairman before election
Valentin Subbot
United Russia
Elected Chairman
Valentin Subbot
United Russia

The 2024 Bryansk Oblast Duma election took place on 6–8 September 2024, on common election day. All 60 seats in the Oblast Duma were up for reelection.

United Russia retained its overwhelming majority in the Oblast Duma, winning 69% of the vote. A Just Russia – For Truth, which narrowly entered the Duma in 2019, failed to cross the threshold but won one single-mandate constituency.

== Electoral system ==
Under current election laws, the Oblast Duma is elected for a term of five years, with parallel voting. 30 seats are elected by party-list proportional representation with a 5% electoral threshold, with the other half elected in 30 single-member constituencies by first-past-the-post voting. Seats in the proportional part are allocated using the Imperiali quota, modified to ensure that every party list, which passes the threshold, receives at least one mandate.

Due to the ongoing Ukrainian incursion early voting was permitted in districts bordering Ukraine during the period from August 30 to September 5.

== Candidates ==
=== Party lists ===
To register regional lists of candidates, parties need to collect 0.5% of signatures of all registered voters in Bryansk Oblast.

The following parties were relieved from the necessity to collect signatures:

- United Russia
- Communist Party of the Russian Federation
- A Just Russia — Patriots — For Truth
- Liberal Democratic Party of Russia
- New People
- Civic Platform
- Rodina
- Communists of Russia

No.	Party	Oblast-wide list	Candidates	Territorial groups	Status
1	New People	Sergey Gorelov • Nikolay Rogov • Alina Aseyeva	68	30	Registered
2	United Russia	Aleksandr Bogomaz • Marina Sedneva • Valentin Subbot	90	30	Registered
3	Communist Party	Andrey Arkhitsky • Yevgeny Melnik • Igor Firsov	76	30	Registered
4	Liberal Democratic Party	Leonid Slutsky • Vadim Dengin • Sergey Antoshin	78	30	Registered
5	Communists of Russia	Ilya Kleymyonov • Yaroslav Sidorov	64	30	Registered
6	Rodina	Gennady Selebin • Aleksandr Maksimenko • Olga Malkina	53	26	Registered
7	A Just Russia – For Truth	Aleksey Timoshkov • Viktor Khanayev • Yekaterina Chivikova	51	29	Registered

New People took part in Bryansk Oblast legislative election for the first time, while Rodina and Communists of Russia were on the ballot after failing to qualify during the 2019 cycle. Civic Platform, who placed 5th in 2019 with 3.36%, chose not to file a party list and nominated one candidate (party regional leader Dmitry Kornilov) in the single-mandate constituency.

=== Single-mandate constituencies ===
30 single-mandate constituencies were formed in Bryansk Oblast. To register candidates in single-mandate constituencies need to collect 3% of signatures of registered voters in the constituency.

Number of candidates in single-mandate constituencies
Party	Candidates	
Party	Nominated	Registered
United Russia	30	30
Liberal Democratic Party	30	30
Communist Party	30	17
A Just Russia – For Truth	22	19
Rodina	1	1
New People	11	8
Civic Platform	1	1
Independent	1	0
Total	126	106

== Results ==
=== Results by party lists ===
Summary of the 6–8 September 2024 Bryansk Oblast Duma election results
Party	Party list					Constituency		Total	
Party	Votes	%	±pp	Seats	+/–	Seats	+/–	Seats	+/–
United Russia	371,245	68.69	▲4.98	24	▲3	27	Steady	51	▲3
Liberal Democratic Party	71,753	13.28	▲0.39	4	Steady	1	Steady	5	Steady
Communist Party	45,129	8.35	▼3.92	2	▼2	0	Steady	2	▼2
A Just Russia — For Truth	18,976	3.51	▼1.61	0	▼1	1	Steady	1	▼1
New People	13,298	2.46	New	0	New	0	New	0	New
Communists of Russia	7,632	1.41	New	0	New	–	–	0	New
Rodina	4,651	0.86	New	0	New	1	New	1	New
Civic Platform	–	–	–	–	–	0	Steady	0	Steady
Invalid ballots	7,810	1.44	▼0.53	—	—	—	—	—	—
Total	540,494	100.00	—	30	Steady	30	Steady	60	Steady
Turnout	540,494	57.22	▼1.23	—	—	—	—	—	—
Registered voters	944,554	100.00	—	—	—	—	—	—	—

Valentin Subbot (United Russia) was re-elected as Chairman of the Oblast Duma, while Oblast Duma member and notary Vasily Popadaylo (United Russia) was appointed to the Federation Council, replacing incumbent Senator Galina Solodun (United Russia).

=== Results in single-member constituencies ===
==== District 1 ====
Summary of the 6–8 September 2024 Bryansk Oblast Duma election in Bezhitsky constituency No.1
Candidate	Party	Votes	%
Sergey Antoshin	Liberal Democratic Party	14,367	71.72%
Vasily Kulinich	United Russia	3,073	15.34%
Natalya Zaytseva	Communist Party	1,329	6.63%
Maria Timoshkova	A Just Russia – For Truth	1,175	5.87%
Total		20,033	100%

==== District 2 ====
Summary of the 6–8 September 2024 Bryansk Oblast Duma election in Bezhitsky constituency No.2
Candidate	Party	Votes	%
Sergey Chesalin (incumbent)	United Russia	17,607	82.33%
Mikhail Tyurin	Liberal Democratic Party	1,602	7.49%
Viktor Kiselev	New People	1,091	5.10%
Timur Suleymanov	A Just Russia – For Truth	1,004	4.69%
Total		21,385	100%

==== District 3 ====
Summary of the 6–8 September 2024 Bryansk Oblast Duma election in Bezhitsky constituency No.3
Candidate	Party	Votes	%
Yevgeny Kiselev (incumbent)	United Russia	12,430	70.41%
Aleksandr Kurilenko	Liberal Democratic Party	4,924	27.89%
Total		17,654	100%

==== District 4 ====
Summary of the 6–8 September 2024 Bryansk Oblast Duma election in Sovetsky constituency No.4
Candidate	Party	Votes	%
Igor Alyokhin (incumbent)	United Russia	11,483	67.44%
Sergey Ryabikov	Liberal Democratic Party	2,314	13.59%
Sergey Zimakov	Communist Party	1,219	7.16%
Stanislav Loktyushin	New People	895	5.26%
Aleksandr Zherdev	A Just Russia – For Truth	758	4.45%
Total		17,026	100%

==== District 5 ====
Summary of the 6–8 September 2024 Bryansk Oblast Duma election in Sovetsky constituency No.5
Candidate	Party	Votes	%
Andrey Antyukhov (incumbent)	United Russia	9,940	69.81%
Nikita Novoseltsev	Liberal Democratic Party	1,647	11.57%
Igor Firsov	Communist Party	1,241	8.72%
Sergey Kirikov	New People	626	4.40%
Alyona Kiseleva	A Just Russia – For Truth	464	3.26%
Total		14,238	100%

==== District 6 ====
Summary of the 6–8 September 2024 Bryansk Oblast Duma election in Sovetsky constituency No.6
Candidate	Party	Votes	%
Svetlana Khandozhko	United Russia	11,689	68.98%
Igor Lobanov	Liberal Democratic Party	2,590	15.28%
Yevgeny Luzan	Communist Party	1,782	10.52%
Zoya Filatova	A Just Russia – For Truth	622	3.67%
Total		16,945	100%

==== District 7 ====
Summary of the 6–8 September 2024 Bryansk Oblast Duma election in Fokinsky constituency No.7
Candidate	Party	Votes	%
Pavel Miseyuk (incumbent)	United Russia	12,660	75.33%
Nikolay Zarodysh	Liberal Democratic Party	2,601	15.48%
Yekaterina Chivikova	A Just Russia – For Truth	1,380	8.21%
Total		16,805	100%

==== District 8 ====
Summary of the 6–8 September 2024 Bryansk Oblast Duma election in Fokinsky constituency No.8
Candidate	Party	Votes	%
Mukhtar Badyrkhanov (incumbent)	United Russia	13,641	78.42%
Yury Avdeyev	Liberal Democratic Party	2,078	11.95%
Aleksey Suslin	Communist Party	744	4.28%
Ivan Chernomazov	New People	426	2.45%
Sergey Moskalenko	A Just Russia – For Truth	401	2.31%
Total		17,935	100%

==== District 9 ====
Summary of the 6–8 September 2024 Bryansk Oblast Duma election in Volodarsky constituency No.9
Candidate	Party	Votes	%
Dmitry Zubikov (incumbent)	United Russia	11,702	69.64%
Sergey Senin	Liberal Democratic Party	2,468	14.69%
Olga Zhilinskaya	Communist Party	1,104	6.57%
Igor Baburin	A Just Russia – For Truth	868	5.17%
Total		16,804	100%

==== District 10 ====
Summary of the 6–8 September 2024 Bryansk Oblast Duma election in Volodarsky constituency No.10
Candidate	Party	Votes	%
Vladislav Boyko	United Russia	10,630	68.47%
Ruslan Titov	Liberal Democratic Party	2,248	14.48%
Dmitry Dashunin	Communist Party	1,041	6.70%
Dmitry Kornilov	Civic Platform	584	3.76%
Nikolay Rogov	New People	439	2.83%
Total		15,526	100%

==== District 11 ====
Summary of the 6–8 September 2024 Bryansk Oblast Duma election in Klintsovsky constituency No.11
Candidate	Party	Votes	%
Vitaly Belyay	United Russia	13,768	70.72%
Valery Bessmertny	Communist Party	3,381	17.37%
Gennady Shkuratov	Liberal Democratic Party	1,438	7.39%
Yelena Shein	A Just Russia – For Truth	733	3.77%
Total		19,467	100%

==== District 12 ====
Summary of the 6–8 September 2024 Bryansk Oblast Duma election in Klintsovsky constituency No.12
Candidate	Party	Votes	%
Yevgeny Starodubets	United Russia	16,339	69.80%
Denis Poznyakov	Communist Party	2,185	9.33%
Ruslan Senkov	Liberal Democratic Party	1,749	7.47%
Yevgenia Dolbenko	A Just Russia – For Truth	1,705	7.28%
Konstantin Sustav	New People	1,149	4.91%
Total		23,408	100%

==== District 13 ====
Summary of the 6–8 September 2024 Bryansk Oblast Duma election in Novozybkovsky constituency No.13
Candidate	Party	Votes	%
Svyatoslav Los	United Russia	7,890	58.13%
Dmitry Shevtsov	Liberal Democratic Party	1,812	13.35%
Andrey Merenkov	Communist Party	1,700	12.52%
Pyotr Sartakov	New People	1,480	10.90%
Total		13,574	100%

==== District 14 ====
Summary of the 6–8 September 2024 Bryansk Oblast Duma election in Dyatkovsky constituency No.14
Candidate	Party	Votes	%
Aleksandr Semenov	United Russia	9,437	72.28%
Dmitry Shpakov	Liberal Democratic Party	1,557	11.93%
Andrey Rarykin	A Just Russia – For Truth	1,125	8.62%
Sergey Gorelov	New People	810	6.20%
Total		13,056	100%

==== District 15 ====
Summary of the 6–8 September 2024 Bryansk Oblast Duma election in Fokinsky constituency No.15
Candidate	Party	Votes	%
Gennady Selebin	Rodina	9,734	59.51%
Dmitry Shusterov	United Russia	4,238	25.91%
Vladimir Kostaganov	Liberal Democratic Party	2,153	13.16%
Total		16,358	100%

==== District 16 ====
Summary of the 6–8 September 2024 Bryansk Oblast Duma election in Zhukovsky constituency No.16
Candidate	Party	Votes	%
Aleksey Timoshkov	A Just Russia – For Truth	7,835	52.77%
Aleksey Vorobyev (incumbent)	United Russia	4,770	32.13%
Roman Tikhonov	Liberal Democratic Party	1,473	9.92%
Total		14,847	100%

==== District 17 ====
Summary of the 6–8 September 2024 Bryansk Oblast Duma election in Vygonichsky constituency No.17
Candidate	Party	Votes	%
Aleksandr Zhutenkov (incumbent)	United Russia	14,559	71.76%
Roman Merkushin	Liberal Democratic Party	1,847	9.10%
Aleksandr Zimonin	Communist Party	1,820	8.97%
Irina Baburina	A Just Russia – For Truth	1,590	7.84%
Total		20,289	100%

==== District 18 ====
Summary of the 6–8 September 2024 Bryansk Oblast Duma election in Bryansky constituency No.18
Candidate	Party	Votes	%
Yury Tyulenev	United Russia	13,484	67.21%
Viktor Yerokhin	Communist Party	2,500	12.46%
Anna Biryukova	A Just Russia – For Truth	1,868	9.31%
Pavel Rebeko	Liberal Democratic Party	1,621	8.08%
Total		20,062	100%

==== District 19 ====
Summary of the 6–8 September 2024 Bryansk Oblast Duma election in Dubrovsky constituency No.19
Candidate	Party	Votes	%
Vladimir Moskvichev (incumbent)	United Russia	9,783	71.20%
Vasily Tsymbalyuk	Communist Party	1,575	11.46%
Valentina Ivashchenkova	Liberal Democratic Party	1,487	10.82%
Ivan Filimonov	A Just Russia – For Truth	671	4.88%
Total		13,740	100%

==== District 20 ====
Summary of the 6–8 September 2024 Bryansk Oblast Duma election in Karachevsky constituency No.20
Candidate	Party	Votes	%
Roman Mimonov (incumbent)	United Russia	13,267	76.19%
Oksana Kuzheleva	A Just Russia – For Truth	1,944	11.16%
Artyom Litvinov	Liberal Democratic Party	1,916	11.00%
Total		17,414	100%

==== District 21 ====
Summary of the 6–8 September 2024 Bryansk Oblast Duma election in Navlinsky constituency No.21
Candidate	Party	Votes	%
Andrey Bogatikov (incumbent)	United Russia	15,504	80.92%
Svetlana Abrosimova	Liberal Democratic Party	3,258	17.00%
Total		19,160	100%

==== District 22 ====
Summary of the 6–8 September 2024 Bryansk Oblast Duma election in Komarichsky constituency No.22
Candidate	Party	Votes	%
Mikhail Kabanov (incumbent)	United Russia	12,428	72.47%
Nikolay Ageyev	Liberal Democratic Party	2,326	13.56%
Sergey Morozov	Communist Party	2,036	11.87%
Total		17,149	100%

==== District 23 ====
Summary of the 6–8 September 2024 Bryansk Oblast Duma election in Mglinsky constituency No.23
Candidate	Party	Votes	%
Aleksandr Rezunov	United Russia	13,868	81.84%
Irina Druzhkova	Liberal Democratic Party	2,868	16.80%
Total		17,068	100%

==== District 24 ====
Summary of the 6–8 September 2024 Bryansk Oblast Duma election in Pochepsky constituency No.24
Candidate	Party	Votes	%
Aleksandr Graborov	United Russia	11,552	72.41%
Aleksandr Vitovtsov	Communist Party	2,256	14.14%
Anton Zaytsev	Liberal Democratic Party	1,663	10.42%
Total		15,954	100%

==== District 25 ====
Summary of the 6–8 September 2024 Bryansk Oblast Duma election in Pogarsky constituency No.25
Candidate	Party	Votes	%
Aleksandr Postoyalko (incumbent)	United Russia	12,888	74.22%
Vladimir Mikheyev	Liberal Democratic Party	3,648	21.01%
Total		17,365	100%

==== District 26 ====
Summary of the 6–8 September 2024 Bryansk Oblast Duma election in Klimovsky constituency No.26
Candidate	Party	Votes	%
Vasily Popadaylo (incumbent)	United Russia	13,246	70.46%
Sergey Akulov	Communist Party	2,169	11.54%
Maria Shklyar	Liberal Democratic Party	1,838	9.78%
Dmitry Stalmakhovich	A Just Russia – For Truth	1,002	5.33%
Total		18,799	100%

==== District 27 ====
Summary of the 6–8 September 2024 Bryansk Oblast Duma election in Surazhsky constituency No.27
Candidate	Party	Votes	%
Nikolay Kovtunov (incumbent)	United Russia	19,892	87.54%
Aleksandr Kashenok	A Just Russia – For Truth	1,525	6.71%
Andrey Viktorenko	Liberal Democratic Party	1,194	5.25%
Total		22,723	100%

==== District 28 ====
Summary of the 6–8 September 2024 Bryansk Oblast Duma election in Starodubsky constituency No.28
Candidate	Party	Votes	%
Yury Nikiforov (incumbent)	United Russia	21,428	85.14%
Eduard Kovalev	Communist Party	2,531	10.06%
Olga Morozova	Liberal Democratic Party	1,022	4.06%
Total		25,169	100%

==== District 29 ====
Summary of the 6–8 September 2024 Bryansk Oblast Duma election in Trubchevsky constituency No.29
Candidate	Party	Votes	%
Andrey Pikatov	United Russia	15,270	77.21%
Tatyana Strizhnyova	Liberal Democratic Party	4,235	21.41%
Total		19,777	100%

==== District 30 ====
Summary of the 6–8 September 2024 Bryansk Oblast Duma election in Unechsky constituency No.30
Candidate	Party	Votes	%
Svetlana Kudinova (incumbent)	United Russia	11,437	63.90%
Aleksey Ruban	Liberal Democratic Party	3,614	20.19%
Sergey Gomankov	A Just Russia – For Truth	2,481	13.86%
Total		17,898	100%

=== Members ===
Incumbent deputies are highlighted with bold, elected members who declined to take a seat are marked with ~~strikethrough~~.

Constituency
No.	Member	Party
1	Sergey Antoshin	Liberal Democratic Party
2	Sergey Chesalin	United Russia
3	Yevgeny Kiselev	United Russia
4	Igor Alyokhin	United Russia
5	Andrey Antyukhov	United Russia
6	Svetlana Khandozhko	United Russia
7	Pavel Miseyuk	United Russia
8	Mukhtar Badyrkhanov	United Russia
9	Dmitry Zubikov	United Russia
10	Vladislav Boyko	United Russia
11	Vitaly Belyay	United Russia
12	Yevgeny Starodubets	United Russia
13	Svyatoslav Los	United Russia
14	Aleksandr Semyonov	United Russia
15	Gennady Selebin	Rodina
16	Aleksey Timoshkov	A Just Russia – For Truth
17	Aleksandr Zhutenkov	United Russia
18	Yury Tyulenev	United Russia
19	Vladimir Moskvichev	United Russia
20	Roman Mimonov	United Russia
21	Andrey Bogatikov	United Russia
22	Mikhail Kabanov	United Russia
23	Aleksandr Rezunov	United Russia
24	Aleksandr Graborov	United Russia
25	Aleksandr Postoyalko	United Russia
26	Vasily Popadaylo	United Russia
27	Nikolay Kovtunov	United Russia
28	Yury Nikiforov	United Russia
29	Andrey Pikatov	United Russia
30	Svetlana Kudinova	United Russia

Party lists
Member	Party
~~Alexander Bogomaz~~	United Russia
Marina Sedneva	United Russia
Valentin Subbot	United Russia
Denis Fedorichev	United Russia
Sergey Shachnev	United Russia
Aleksandr Gavrichkov	United Russia
Vyacheslav Gubanov	United Russia
Olga Polyakova	United Russia
Natalya Nazarova	United Russia
Nikolay Alexeyenko	United Russia
Fyodor Sushok	United Russia
Nikolay Bardadyn	United Russia
Nikolay Yakushenko	United Russia
Aleksey Krasnikov	United Russia
Lyudmila Zhuravleva	United Russia
Vladimir Pronin	United Russia
Nikolay Patov	United Russia
Mikhail Kasatsky	United Russia
Igor Sukhachev	United Russia
Galina Solodun	United Russia
Nikolay Podolyako	United Russia
Denis Svistunov	United Russia
Dmitry Agapov	United Russia
Mikhail Dovgalev	United Russia
~~Leonid Slutsky~~	Liberal Democratic Party
~~Vadim Dengin~~	Liberal Democratic Party
Maksim Ivanchenko	Liberal Democratic Party
Ruslan Senkov	Liberal Democratic Party
Andrey Arkhitsky	Communist Party
Yevgeny Melnik	Communist Party

== See also ==
- 2024 Russian elections
