= 2025 Bryansk Oblast gubernatorial election =

- 12–14 September 2025
- Turnout: 58.15% ▲7.81 pp
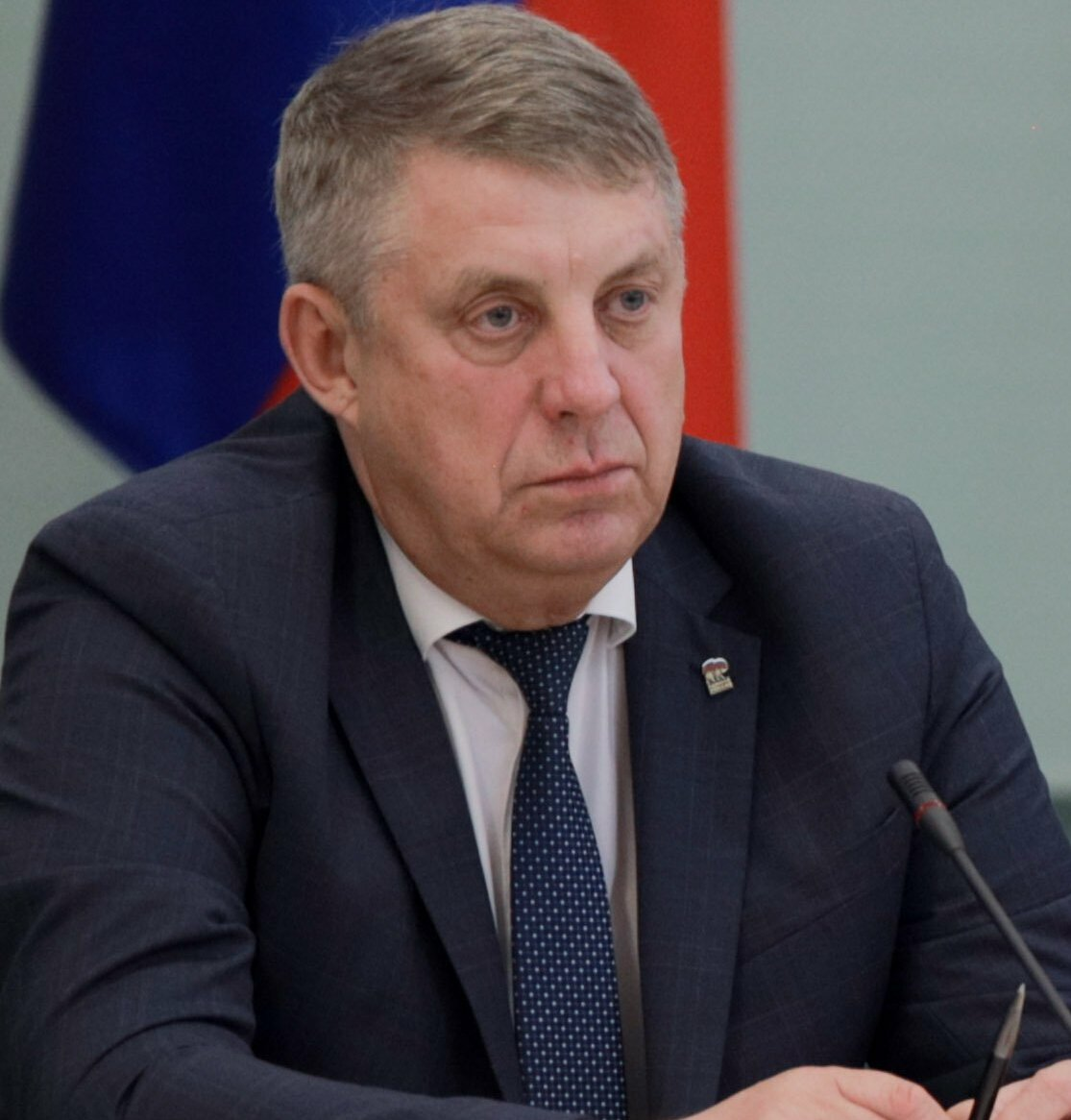
		CPRF	SR–ZP
Candidate	Alexander Bogomaz	Andrey Arkhitsky	Aleksey Timoshkov
Party	United Russia	CPRF	SR–ZP
Popular vote	428,273	58,266	30,018
Percentage	78.78%	10.72%	5.52%
Governor before election
Alexander Bogomaz
United Russia
Governor-elect
Alexander Bogomaz
United Russia

The 2025 Bryansk Oblast gubernatorial election took place on 12–14 September 2025, on common election day. Incumbent governor of Bryansk Oblast Alexander Bogomaz was re-elected to a third term in office.

== Background ==
Member of State Duma Alexander Bogomaz was appointed acting governor of Bryansk Oblast in September 2014 after previous incumbent Nikolay Denin was dismissed after a criminal case was opened against him. Bogomaz ran for a full term in 2015 and overwhelmingly won the election with 79.96% of the vote after CPRF and LDPR declined to field own candidates. Governor Bogomaz won re-election to a second term in 2020 with 71.69% of the vote.

Initially Governor of Bryansk Oblast was limited for just two consecutive terms so Bogomaz would have been term-limited in 2025. However, in December 2021 "On Common Principles of Organisation of Public Authority in the Subjects of the Russian Federation" law was enacted, which lifted term limits for Russian governors. Bryansk Oblast followed suit and lifted the restrictions, which allowed Bogomaz to seek another term in 2025.

Bogomaz was viewed as a potential candidate for replacement as governor prior to the 2025 election. Among reasons for Bogomaz's potential resignation experts cited his long tenure in office, corruption cases involving regional officials (among those arrested were deputy governors Yelena Yegorova and Tatyana Kuleshova in 2023, Aleksandr Petrochenko in 2024) conflicts with Security Council of Russia secretary Sergey Shoigu as well as Ukrainian incursions into Bryansk Oblast.

In February 2025 during a meeting with President Vladimir Putin Governor Bogomaz announced his intention to run for a third term and received Putin's endorsement.

== Candidates ==
In Bryansk Oblast candidates for Governor of Bryansk Oblast can be nominated only by registered political parties. Candidate for Governor of Bryansk Oblast should be a Russian citizen and at least 30 years old. Candidates for Governor of Bryansk Oblast should not have a foreign citizenship or residence permit. Each candidate in order to be registered is required to collect at least 7% of signatures of members and heads of municipalities. Also gubernatorial candidates present 3 candidacies to the Federation Council and election winner later appoints one of the presented candidates.

=== Declared ===
Candidate name, political party		Occupation	Status	Ref.
Andrey Arkhitsky; Communist Party		Member of Bryansk Oblast Duma (2009–2014, 2019–present); 2020 gubernatorial candidate	Registered	
Alexander Bogomaz; United Russia	Alexander Bogomaz	Incumbent Governor of Bryansk Oblast (2014–present)	Registered	
Gennady Selebin; Rodina		Member of Bryansk Oblast Duma (2024–present); Library director	Registered	
Aleksey Timoshkov; SR–ZP		Member of Bryansk Oblast Duma (2024–present)	Registered	

=== Eliminated at the convention ===
- Nikolay Yakushenko (United Russia), Deputy Chairman of the Bryansk Oblast Duma (2024–present)

=== Declined ===
- Sergey Antoshin (LDPR), Member of Bryansk Oblast Duma (2014–2023, 2024–present)

=== Candidates for Federation Council ===
Head candidate, political party	Candidates for Federation Council	Status
Andrey Arkhitsky; Communist Party	* Marina Amiranashvili, lawyer * Vladimir Kravchenko, Member of Pochepsky District Council of People's Deputies (2009–present), former Member of Bryansk Oblast Duma (1996–2009) * Oleg Petrov, former Member of Novozybkov City Council of People's Deputies (2014–2019)	Registered
Alexander Bogomaz; United Russia	* Irina Agafonova, Deputy Governor of Bryansk Oblast (2021–present) * Vadim Dengin (LDPR), incumbent Senator (2020–present) * Yevgeny Vyltsan, Russian Army veteran	Registered
Gennady Selebin; Rodina	* Nina Andreyeva, aide to Gennady Selebin * Aleksandr Maksimenko, library chief custodian * Yelena Zezeka, library deputy director	Registered
Aleksey Timoshkov; SR–ZP	* Dmitry Krotov, individual entrepreneur * Yekaterina Milyutina, former Member of Snezhka Rural Council of People's Deputies (2009–2014), accountant * Irina Popova, Member of Zhukovsky District Council of People's Deputies (2020–present), accountant	Registered

== Finances ==
All sums are in rubles.

Financial Report	Source	Arkhitsky	Bogomaz	Selebin	Timoshkov
First		150,000	130,000	130,000	130,000
Final		TBD	TBD	TBD	TBD

== Polls ==
Fieldwork date	Polling firm	Bogomaz	Arkhitsky	Timoshkov	Selebin	Lead
14 September 2025	2025 election	78.8	10.7	5.5	3.6	68.1
9–22 August 2025	FOM	75.9	10.1	9.7	2.4	65.8

== Results ==
Summary of the 12–14 September 2025 Bryansk Oblast gubernatorial election results
Candidate	Party	Votes	%
Alexander Bogomaz (incumbent)	United Russia	428,273	78.78
Andrey Arkhitsky	Communist Party	58,266	10.72
Aleksey Timoshkov	A Just Russia – For Truth	30,018	5.52
Gennady Selebin	Rodina	19,359	3.56
Valid votes		535,916	98.59
Blank ballots		7,691	1.41
Total		543,607	100.00
Turnout		543,607	58.15
Registered voters		934,817	100.00

Governor Bogomaz re-appointed incumbent Senator Vadim Dengin (LDPR) to the Federation Council.

== See also ==
- 2025 Russian regional elections
