= Governor of Bryansk Oblast =

Highest-ranking official in Bryansk Oblast, Russia

- Coat of arms of Bryansk Oblast

- Incumbent; Yegor Kovalchuk since 13 May 2026
- Seat: Bryansk
- Term length: 5 years
- Inaugural holder: Vladimir Barabanov
- Formation: 1991
- Website: www.bryanskobl.ru

The governor of Bryansk Oblast (Russian: Губернатор Брянской области) is the highest official of Bryansk Oblast, a federal subject of Russia. The governor heads the executive branch in the region and is elected by direct popular vote for the term of five years.

== History of office ==
The first post-Soviet head of Bryansk Oblast was Vladimir Barabanov, people's deputy of the RSFSR, deputy chairman of the Navlinsky District council and presidential representative in the region. On 14 December 1991, he took the position of acting Head of Administration, and he was approved in office a month later.

In April 1993 Barabanov lost the first gubernatorial elections to Communist people's deputy Yury Lodkin. Five months later, during the final stage of the 1993 Russian constitutional crisis Lodkin expressed his support to the Supreme Soviet and anti-Yeltsinist forces. He was sacked by president on 25 September, and governor's office was stormed by the police. For the next three years Yury Lodkin unsuccessfully contested his removal in courts. The next governor-appointee Vladimir Karpov fell in the summer of 1995, as a result of conflict between his alleged patron businessman Oleg Kibalchich and other powerful figures in the region.

Vladimir Barabanov was appointed again, but his second reign did not last long. In May 1996 an address of pro-Yeltsin Bryansk politicians appeared, in which Barabanov was accused of disloyalty to the federal government, close cooperation with the Communists and Lodkin. Barabanov allegedly created "a situation for the defeat of democracy", meaning possible low results of Yeltsin in Bryansk Oblast in the upcoming presidential election. Barabanov's deputy and successor Alexander Semernyov was defeated by Lodkin in December 1996. In 2000, Lodkin's main competitors were businessmen Nikolay Denin and Yury Dyomochkin. Lodkin received 29% of the vote and was declared winner as the first-past-the-post system was used that year.

In 2004 Yury Lodkin was nominated for a third term with support from Communist and Agrarian parties, but he was removed from registration "for abuse of office". Lodkin linked his removing from ballot with his Communist Party membership. He accused the United Russia party of “unwillingness to win legally” and called his supporters to vote against all. Nikolay Denin was elected next governor of Bryansk Oblast.

In 2007, Denin was appointed for a second term, as gubernatorial elections were not held in Russia from 2005 to 2012. After reform of the federal legislature, Bryansk Oblast became one of the five regions to hold elections in 2012. On 5 October Denin was removed from ballot due to invalid signatures of his supporters' submitted to the election commission. Six days later, the decision of the regional court was canceled by the Supreme Court, and United Russia's candidate successfully re-elected on 14 October. In 2014, Denin was dismissed by Vladimir Putin due to the "loss of president's trust."

== List of officeholders ==
No.	Portrait	Governor	Tenure	Time in office	Party	Election
–		Vladimir Barabanov (born 1951)	14 December 1991 – 22 January 1992	1 year, 133 days	Independent	Acting
1		Vladimir Barabanov (born 1951)	22 January 1992 – 26 April 1993 (lost election)	1 year, 133 days	Independent	Appointed
2		Yury Lodkin (born 1938)	26 April 1993 – 25 September 1993 (removed)	152 days	Communist	1993
–		Vladimir Karpov (1948–2015)	25 September 1993 – 18 December 1993	1 year, 325 days	Independent	Acting
3		Vladimir Karpov (1948–2015)	18 December 1993 – 16 August 1995 (resigned)	1 year, 325 days	Independent	Appointed
(1)		Vladimir Barabanov (born 1951)	16 August 1995 – 29 May 1996 (removed)	287 days	Independent	Appointed
4		Aleksandr Semernyov (born 1958)	19 June 1996 – 27 December 1996 (lost election)	191 days	Independent	Appointed
(2)		Yury Lodkin (born 1938)	27 December 1996 – 28 December 2004 (disqualified from election)	8 years, 1 day	Communist	1996; 2000
5		Nikolay Denin (born 1958)	28 December 2004 – 9 September 2014 (removed)	9 years, 255 days	United Russia	2004; 2007 (Note: Appointed by the president of Russia with the consent of the Bryansk Oblast Duma.); 2012
–		Alexander Bogomaz (born 1961)	9 September 2014 – 28 September 2015	11 years, 246 days	United Russia	Acting
6		Alexander Bogomaz (born 1961)	28 September 2015 – 13 May 2026 (resigned)	11 years, 246 days	United Russia	2015; 2020; 2025
–		Yegor Kovalchuk (born 1973)	13 May 2026 – 28 September 2026	182 days	United Russia	Acting
7		Yegor Kovalchuk (born 1973)	28 September 2026 – present	182 days	United Russia	2026

== Sources ==
- Ivanov, Vitaly (2019). Глава субъекта Российской Федерации. История губернаторов. Том I. Книга I [Head of the subject of the Russian Federation. History of governors. Volume I. Book I] (in Russian). ISBN 978-5-907250-14-7.
- Ivanov, Vitaly (2020). Глава субъекта Российской Федерации. История губернаторов. Том I. Книга II [Head of the subject of the Russian Federation. History of governors. Volume I. Book II] (in Russian).
