= Vasily Popadaylo =

- Василий Попадайло
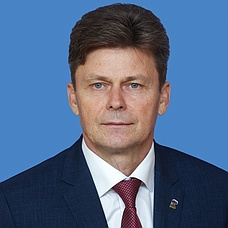

Senator from Bryansk Oblast
- Incumbent
- Assumed office 24 September 2024
- Preceded by: Galina Solodun

Personal details
- Born: 6 July 1963 (age 63) Klimovo, RSFSR, Soviet Union
- Party: United Russia
- Education: MVD Academy of Management; MVD Academy of Belarus
- Awards: Medal "For Battle Merit"

Vasily Vasilyevich Popadaylo (Russian: Василий Васильевич Попадайло; born July 6, 1963, in Klimovo, Bryansk Oblast) is a Russian law enforcement official and a politician. He has been a Senator of the Federation Council and a representative of the Bryansk Oblast Duma since September 24, 2024. He is a member of the Federation Council Committee on Constitutional Legislation and State Building.

== Biography ==
Born in 1963 in Klimovo, Bryansk Oblast.

From 1981 to 1983, he served in the Soviet Armed Forces, performing international duty in Afghanistan. He holds a higher education degree, and from 1984 to 1986, he studied full-time at the Kaliningrad Special Police School.

From 1983 to 1998, he served in the Ministry of Internal Affairs of the Soviet Union and following the dissolution of the Soviet Union, in the Ministry of Internal Affairs of the Russian Federation. From 1986 to 1991, he was the head of the department for combating theft of socialist property at the Klimovsky District Department of Internal Affairs. From 1991 to 1992, he was the head of the organized crime department at the Klintsovsky District Department of Internal Affairs. From 1992 to 1994, he graduated from the Management Academy of the Ministry of Internal Affairs of Russia. From 1994 to 1998, he was the head of the criminal police of the Starodubsky District. In 1996, he participated in the First Chechen War, for which he was nominated for early promotion to the rank of police lieutenant colonel.

In 1998, he retired due to length of service. From 1999 to September 2024, he worked in the justice system as a notary in the Starodubsky Notary District.

On September 24, 2024, he was appointed Senator of the Federation Council from the Bryansk Oblast Duma. On October 9, 2024, he became a member of the Federation Council Committee on Constitutional Legislation and State Building.
