= Galina Solodun =

Russian politician (born 1968)

- Галина Солодун
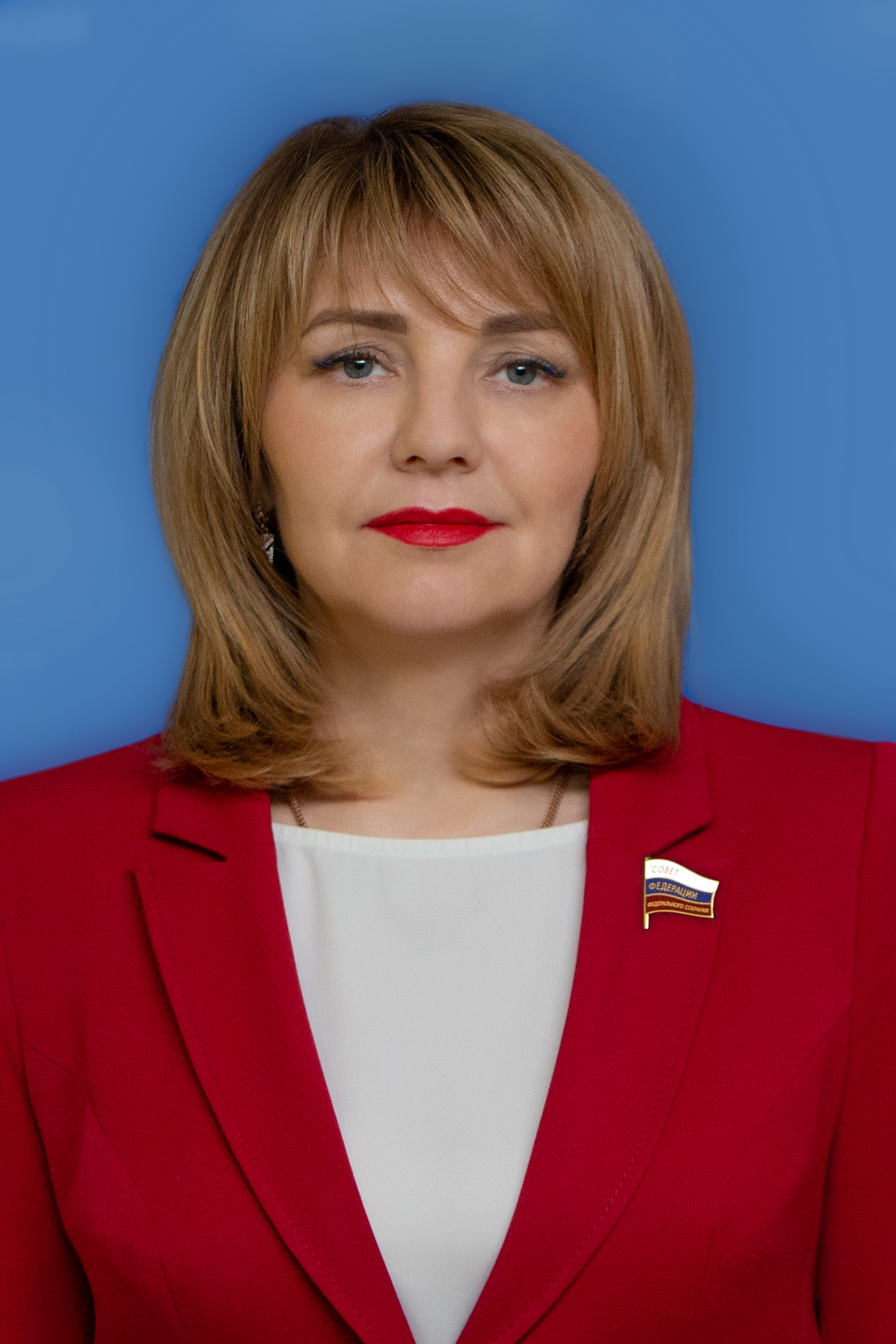
- Solodun Galina Nikolaevna, senator of the Russian Federation from the legislative branch of the Bryansk region

Senator from Bryansk Oblast
- In office 27 September 2019 – 13 September 2024
- Preceded by: Ekaterina Lakhova
- Succeeded by: Vasily Popadaylo

Personal details
- Born: Galina Solodun; 26 January 1968 (age 58) Starodubsky District, Bryansk Oblast, Russian Soviet Federative Socialist Republic, Soviet Union
- Party: United Russia
- Education: Bryansk State Technical University

Galina Nikolayevna Solodun (Russian: Галина Николаевна Солодун; born 26 January 1968) is a Russian politician who served as a senator from Bryansk Oblast from 27 September 2019 to 13 September 2024.

== Biography ==
Galina Solodun was born on 26 January 1968 in Starodubsky District, Bryansk Oblast. In 2010, she graduated from the Bryansk State Technical University. From December 2015 to September 2019, she was the director of the Department of infrastructure and architecture of Bryansk Oblast. On 8 September 2019, Solodun was elected deputy of the Bryansk Oblast Duma of the 7th convocation. On 27 September 2019, she became the senator from the Bryansk Oblast Duma.

Galina Solodun is under personal sanctions introduced by the European Union, the United Kingdom, the USA, Canada, Switzerland, Australia, Ukraine, New Zealand, for ratifying the decisions of the "Treaty of Friendship, Cooperation and Mutual Assistance between the Russian Federation and the Donetsk People's Republic and between the Russian Federation and the Luhansk People's Republic" and providing political and economic support for Russia's annexation of Ukrainian territories.
