= Aleksandr Semernyov =

Russian politician

- Александр Семернёв
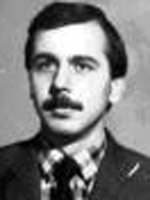

Governor of Bryansk Oblast
- In office 19 June 1996 – 27 December 1996
- Preceded by: Vladimir Barabanov
- Succeeded by: Yury Lodkin

Personal details
- Born: Aleksandr Mikhailovich Semernyov; 7 November 1958 (age 66); Kletnya, Russian SFSR, Soviet Union

Aleksandr Mikhailovich Semernyov (Russian: Александр Михайлович Семернёв; born 7 November 1958), is a Russian politician who served as the governor of Bryansk Oblast in 1996.

== Biography ==
Aleksandr Semernyov was born on 7 November 1958 in the village of Kletnya, Bryansk Oblast. He graduated from the Bryansk Agricultural Institute, and the Higher Komsomol School. He worked as an agronomist at the state farm, and carried out Komsomol work.

From 1993 to 1996, Semernyov was the Deputy Governor of Bryansk Oblast. On 19 June 1996, by decree of the President of the Russia, Boris Yeltsin, Semernyov was appointed the 5th Governor (head) of Bryansk Oblast. While serving as governor, he openly defended Yeltsin's reforms. In the gubernatorial elections in December 1996, he lost the gubernatorial elections to the communist Yury Lodkin, the former head of the regional administration, who was removed in 1993 after the dissolution of the Supreme Soviet of Russia.

From 1996 to 2003, Semernyov was a Trade Representative of Russia in Bulgaria. Since 2003, he was elected a deputy of the Bryansk Oblast Duma, and was the leader of the Patriotic Bryansk movement, and the chairman of the Bryansk branch of the People's Party of the Russian Federation. In December 2004, he again ran for the position of governor of Bryansk Oblast, but placed fifth, receiving 4.87% of the vote.
