= Yury Lodkin =

Russian politician

- Юрий Лодкин
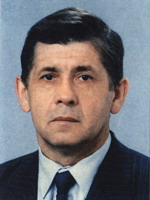

Governor of Bryansk Oblast
- In office 27 December 1996 – 28 December 2004
- Preceded by: Aleksandr Semernyov
- Succeeded by: Nikolay Denin

Member of the State Duma
- In office 17 December 1995 – 27 December 1996

Head of Bryansk Oblast Administration
- In office 23 April 1993 – 25 September 1993
- Preceded by: Vladimir Barabanov
- Succeeded by: Vladimir Karpov

Personal details
- Born: 26 March 1938 (age 88) Dyatkovo, Russian SFSR, Soviet Union
- Party: Communist Party of the Russian Federation

Yury Yevgenyevich Lodkin (Russian: Юрий Евгеньевич Лодкин; born 26 March 1938), is a Russian politician who served two terms as governor of Bryansk Oblast, the first in 1993, and the second from 1996 to 2004.

Lodkin was also a member of the State Duma's second convocation, from 1995 to 1996, as a member of the Communist Party of the Russian Federation.

== Biography ==
Yury Lodkin was born in the city of Dyatkovo, Oryol Oblast, in the Russian Soviet Federative Socialist Republic, Soviet Union, on 26 March 1938. His family were accused of helping Soviet partisans during the Second World War, resulting in the four-year old Yury and his mother spending one and a half years in a concentration camp in Alytus, Lithuania.

In 1958, Lodkin graduated from the Dyatkovo industrial technical school with a degree as a glass technologist, and began working as a shift supervisor at the Slobodsky glass factory in Kirov Oblast. From 1959 to 1961, he served in the Soviet Army. From 1961 to 1963, he was employed as a worker and technologist in an enterprise. From 1963 to 1968, he carried out Komsomol and party work. He was a member of the Communist Party of the Soviet Union from 1964 to August 1991.

From 1967 to 1972, Lodkin studied at the Higher Party School under the Central Committee of the Communist Party of the Soviet Union, majoring in journalism. From 1968 to 1984, he worked as a journalist in district and regional newspapers. In 1984, he was appointed head of the press sector, as an assistant to the first secretary of the regional committee of the CPSU of Bryansk Oblast. From 1987 to 1993, Lodkin was a correspondent for TASS.

=== Political career ===
On 26 April 1993, Lodkin was elected Governor (Head) of Bryansk Oblast, gaining 51.4% of the vote in the second round against 44.9% of the vote cast for the incumbent governor, Vladimir Barabanov. On 25 September 1993, President Boris Yeltsin dismissed Lodkin from office for disobeying Decree No. 1400. That decision was disputed by the Congress of People's Deputies of Russia.

On 12 December 1993, he was elected to the Federation Council, and was a member of the Committee on Social Policy, and a member of the Credentials Commission. From 1995 to 1996, Lodkin became a deputy of the State Duma's second convocation, and was a member of the Communist Party of the Russian Federation faction, and was a member of the committee on veterans' affairs, and a member of the commission of the Interparliamentary Assembly of the CIS member states on social policy and human rights.

On 8 December 1996, Lodkin was reelected head of the regional administration with the support of the Patriotic Bryansk movement. He became a member of the Federation Council, was a member of the Commission on Regulations and Parliamentary Procedures, and Deputy Chairman of the Committee on CIS Affairs. On 27 December 1996, Lodkin resigned from the State Duma in order to take up the office of the Governor of Bryansk Oblast. The mandate was passed to Sergey Sukharev. Since July 1998, Lodkin was a representative of the Federation Council in the Parliamentary Assembly of the Union State of Belarus and Russia. On 10 December 2000, he was reelected, receiving 29.39% of the vote.

On 5 December 2004, a few hours before the start of voting, by the decision of the Supreme Court, Lodkin was suspended from participation in the elections on charges of violations of the law. Lodkin, who was considered one of the campaign's favorites, linked the suspension to his membership in the Communist Party of the Russian Federation and called the candidacy of United Russia representative Nikolay Denin "the worst of all". The day after Lodkin was dismissed, a rally was held in his support, in which from 500 to 1000 people took part. Lodkin accused United Russia representatives of unwillingness to "win the elections fairly" and called them "cowards." Lodkin and Gennady Zyuganov called on supporters to vote against everyone in the elections. After Lodkin's removal, about 20% of voters in the first round voted against all candidates.

=== Activities in the regional duma ===
After being removed from the elections, Lodkin was elected to the Bryansk Oblast Duma. In 2006, he was attacked by an unknown person, he was treated in the intensive care unit of the regional hospital.
