= Vladimir Karpov (politician) =

Russian politician

- Владимир Карпов

Governor of Bryansk Oblast
- In office 25 September 1993 – 16 August 1995
- Preceded by: Yury Lodkin
- Succeeded by: Vladimir Barabanov

Personal details
- Born: Vladimir Aleksandrovich Karpov; 27 October 1948; Turovskaya, Arkhangelsk Oblast, Russian SFSR, Soviet Union
- Died: 19 May 2015 (aged 66); Bryansk, Russia
- Political party: Union of Right Forces

Vladimir Aleksandrovich Karpov (Russian: Владимир Александрович Карпов; 27 October 1948 - 19 May 2015) was a Russian politician, who was the Governor of Bryansk Oblast from 1993 to 1995.

== Biography ==
Vladimir Karpov was born on 27 October 1948 in the village of Turovskaya, Arkhangelsk Oblast, in what was then the Russian Soviet Federative Socialist Republic, in the Soviet Union. He graduated from the Leningrad Financial and Credit College and the Moscow Financial and Economic Institute.

Karpov worked as an inspector of the State Insurance in the village of Krasnaya Gora, in Bryansk Oblast, in the planning and economic department of the Bryansk regional executive committee. From 1992 to 1993, he was the head of the Territorial Committee for State Property Management of the Bryansk Oblast.

On 25 September 1993, after governor Yury Lodkin was removed from his post, Karpov was appointed acting governor, and on 18 December, he was sworn into office. On 16 August 1995, Karpov was also removed from office by decree of the President of the Russia.

From 2000 to 2008, Karpov worked in the office of the Union of Right Forces party in Moscow.

Vladimir Aleksandrovich Karpov died on 19 May 2015 in Bryansk at the age of 66.
