= Alexander Bogomaz =

Russian politician (born 1961)

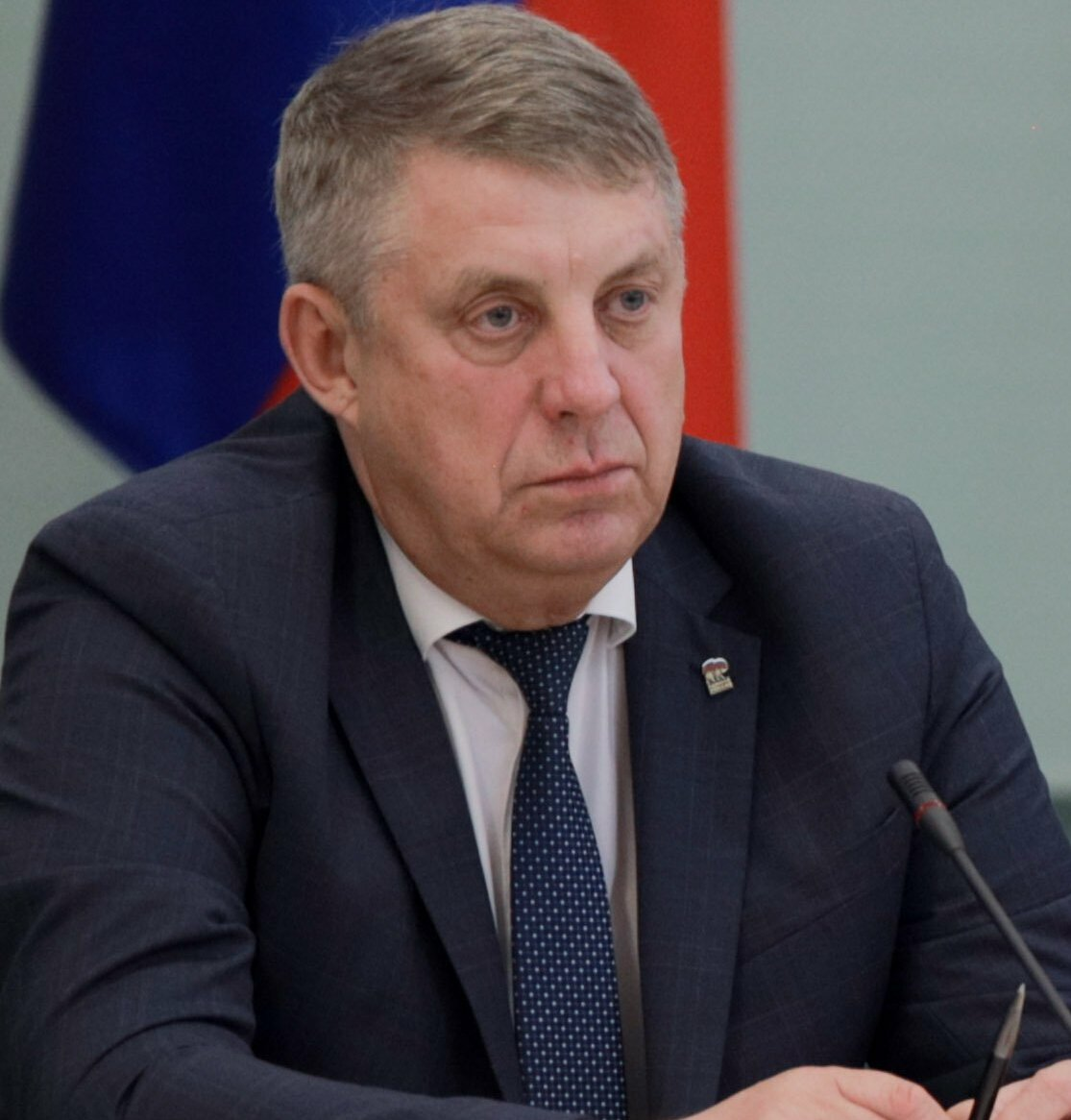

Deputy of the State Duma Russia
- Incumbent
- Assumed office 14 May 2026
- Preceded by: Ayrat Farrakhov

Governor of Bryansk Oblast
- In office 28 September 2015 – 13 May 2026
- President: Vladimir Putin
- Preceded by: Nikolay Denin
- Succeeded by: Egor Kovalchuk (acting)

Personal details
- Born: 23 February 1961 (age 65) Gridenki, Starodubsky District, Russian SFSR, Soviet Union
- Party: United Russia
- Education: Bryansk State University of Engineering and Technology

Alexander Vasilyevich Bogomaz (Russian: Александр Васильевич Богомаз; born 23 February 1961) is a Russian politician. Deputy of the State Duma Russia from 14 May 2026 year.

Who has been serving as the governor of Bryansk Oblast since 28 September 2015 to 13 May 2026.

== Biography ==
He was born on 23 February 1961 in the village of Gridenki, Starodubsky District, Bryansk Oblast. His mother, Nadezhda Filippovna, was a primary school teacher and school principal while his father graduated from the construction college, then the Starodubsky Pedagogical School and participated in World War 2. After army service he graduated from a military school, then a pedagogical institute in Novozybkov. He worked as a teacher at school teaching Russian, literature, drawing, labor and German. He has three older sisters.

He began his career in 1977 as a turner on CNC machine tools at the Bryansk Road Machine Plant. Between 1983 and 1998 he worked at the Burnovichi state farm in the Starodubsky District of Bryansk Oblast, having gone from engineer to deputy director. From 1998 to 2003 he was Chief Engineer of PU Starodubraygaz of JSC Bryanskoblgaz. Between 2009 and 2012 he was head of the Bogomaz Collective farming. From 2003 to 2004 he was First Deputy Head of the Administration of the Starodubsky District of Bryansk Oblast. From 2004 to 2009, he was elected as a deputy of representative bodies of local self-government in the Starodubsky District of Bryansk Oblast in single-member constituencies. He was elected as a deputy of the Melensky rural settlement in the single-mandate constituency No. 1, head of the Melensky rural settlement - the chairman of the Melensky village Council of People's Deputies, deputy of the Starodubsky District Council of People's Deputies in the single-member constituency No. 18. On 1 March 2009, at the elections of deputies of the Bryansk Oblast Duma, he was elected in single-member constituency No. 28 (Starodubsky), gaining 63.1% of the vote.

In July and August 2011, in anticipation of the State Duma elections in Bryansk Oblast, as well as in other regions of the country, the United Russia party and the All-Russian Popular Front conducted primaries to select candidates from the ONF for inclusion in the party's personnel reserve for the purpose of nominations by candidates for deputies of the State Duma on the party list of "United Russia". Alexander Bogomaz and his wife Olga took part in these primaries. Both were nominated by BRO “Farmers of the Bryansk Region” (AKKOR). Alexander was nominated as the chairman of the board of directors of the Potato Alliance LLC, and Olga as the head of the Bogomaz farm in Starodubsky district. According to the results of the primaries, Alexander Bogomaz took 6th place.

=== State Duma deputy ===
In September, United Russia formed an election list, which included Alexander Bogomaz. In Bryansk Oblast group he went at number 3 after the current State Duma deputies Andrei Bocharov and Yekaterina Lakhova.

In the elections to the State Duma of the 6th convocation held on 4 December 2011, United Russia gained 50.12% of the vote in Bryansk Oblast and received 2 deputy mandates. Thus, Bogomaz did not get into the State Duma. However, less than a year later, on 16 October 2012, Andrei Bocharov resigned the deputy's mandate. The vacant mandate was transferred to Alexander Bogomaz on 31 October. In the State Duma, he worked as part of the committee on science and high technology and the committee on agricultural issues. In September 2014, he resigned from the deputy because he became governor of Bryansk Oblast. The vacant mandate was handed over to Viktor Malashenko.

=== Governor of Bryansk Oblast ===
On 9 September 2014 Russian President Vladimir Putin appointed Alexander Bogomaz as interim governor of Bryansk Oblast. On 19 March 2015 Bogomaz submitted all the necessary documents for participating in the gubernatorial elections.

On 4 August he was registered as a candidate for the Bryansk Oblast Election Commission as a candidate for governor of Bryansk Oblast. On 13 September 2015 he was elected governor of Bryansk Oblast, gaining 79.96% of the vote. He officially took office on 28 September 2015. From 2 August 2019 to 27 January 2020 he was a member of the Presidium of the State Council of the Russian Federation.

=== Sanctions ===
He was sanctioned by the UK government in 2022 in relation to the Russo-Ukrainian War.

== Awards ==
- Order of Alexander Nevsky (2026).
- Order of Friendship (2021).
- Certificate of Honor of the President of the Russian Federation (2018).
- Medal of Saint Reverend and Right-Believing Prince Oleg of Bryansk, 1st class (Bryansk Metropolis of the Russian Orthodox Church, 2019).
- Jubilee Medal “85 Years of Gomel Oblast” (Gomel Oblast, Belarus, 2023).
