= Gridenki =

Gridenki Гриденки
- Village
- Location within Bryansk Oblast Location within Russia
- Coordinates: 52°38′N 32°56′E
- Country: Russia
- Region: Bryansk Oblast
- District: Starodubsky District
- Time zone: UTC+3:00

Gridenki (Russian: Гриденки) is a rural locality (a village) in Starodubsky District, Bryansk Oblast, Russia. The population was 128 as of 2010. There are 3 streets.

== Geography ==
Gridenki is located 16 km northeast of Starodub (the district's administrative centre) by road. Melensk is the nearest rural locality.
