= Vladimir Barabanov =

Russian politician

- Владимир Барабанов
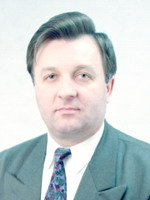

1st & 4th Governor of Bryansk Oblast
- In office 16 August 1995 – 29 May 1996
- Preceded by: Vladimir Karpov
- Succeeded by: Aleksandr Semernyov
- In office 14 December 1991 – 26 April 1993
- Preceded by: Office established
- Succeeded by: Yury Lodkin

Personal details
- Born: Vladimir Aleksandrovich Barabanov; 1 August 1951 (age 75) Zhary, Bryansk Oblast, Russian SFSR, Soviet Union

Vladimir Aleksandrovich Barabanov (Russian: Владимир Александрович Барабанов; born 1 August 1951), is a Russian politician who had served as the first and fourth governor of Bryansk Oblast from 1991 to 1993 during his first term, and from 1995 to 1996 on his second term.

== Biography ==
Vladimir Barabanov was born on 1 August 1951 in the village of Zary, Navlinsky district, Bryansk Oblast, to a large peasant family.

In 1967, he graduated from the Zharovsky eight-year school.

He has higher education. In 1969, he graduated from the Komarichesky school, where he specialized in "tractor operatoring-machinist of a wide profile."

From 1969 to 1970, he worked at the Iskra state farm in the Navlinsky district as a tractor-combine operator.

From 1970 to 1972 he served in the Soviet Army.

In 1976, he worked as a foreman in the Navlinskaya Mobile Mechanized Column 1213.

From 1973 to 1976 he studied at the Bryansk Agricultural College majoring in industrial and civil engineering.

From 1977 to 1979, he was a foreman at the self-supporting construction site of Bryanskstroy.

From 1979 to 1980 - Chief Civil Engineer of the Department of Agriculture of the Navlinsky District Executive Committee.

In the late 1980s, he graduated from the All-Union Agricultural Institute of Correspondence Education with a degree in Organizing Economist.

From 1980 to 1989, he headed the MPMK-2 of Agropromstroy.

From 1989 to 1990, he was deputy chairman of the Navlinsky district executive committee. In 1990, he was elected a people's deputy of the RSFSR and the Navlinsky District Council. At the first session of the Navlinsky district council, he was elected deputy chairman of the district council, at the Congress of People's Deputies he became a member of the Committee of the Russian Armed Forces on the work of the Councils of People's Deputies and the development of self-government, and was a member of the Coalition of Reforms.

From 1990 to 1991, he was Deputy Chairman of the Navlinsky District Council. From October 1991 to February 1992, he was the Representative of the President of Russia in the Bryansk Oblast.

On 14 December 1991, Barabanov was appointed governor (head) of Bryansk Oblast. In January 1992, he was appointed on a formal basis.

In the elections of the head of the Bryansk region in April 1993, Barabanov lost in the second round to Yury Lodkin.

On 26 September 1993, he was reappointed as presidential representative in the Bryansk Oblast. He lost the elections to the Federation Council on 12 December 1993, finishing fourth out of five.

On 16 August 1995, Barabanov was appointed governor again.

On 29 May 1996, by decree of the President of Russia, he was removed from office. He was a member of the Federation Council from the Bryansk Oblast from January to June 1996.

He ran in the elections of the governor of the region in December 1996, took third place, receiving 5.6% of the vote.

In January 1997, he was appointed head of the labor department of the Administration of the Bryansk Oblast.

In December 2000, he again ran for the post of governor of the Bryansk region and took 7th place, gaining 2.96% of the vote.
