= Klimovo, Muromsky District, Vladimir Oblast =

Klimovo Климово
- Selo
- Location within Vladimir Oblast Location within Russia
- Coordinates: 55°44′N 41°46′E
- Country: Russia
- Region: Vladimir Oblast
- District: Muromsky District
- Time zone: UTC+3:00

Klimovo (Russian: Кли́мово) is a rural locality (a selo) in Kovarditskoye Rural Settlement, Muromsky District, Vladimir Oblast, Russia. The population was 42 as of 2010.

== Geography ==
Klimovo is located 33 km northwest of Murom (the district's administrative centre) by road. Selishchi is the nearest rural locality.
