= Ayrat Farrakhov =

Russian politician (born 1968)

Ayrat Farrakhov MP
- Айрат Фаррахов
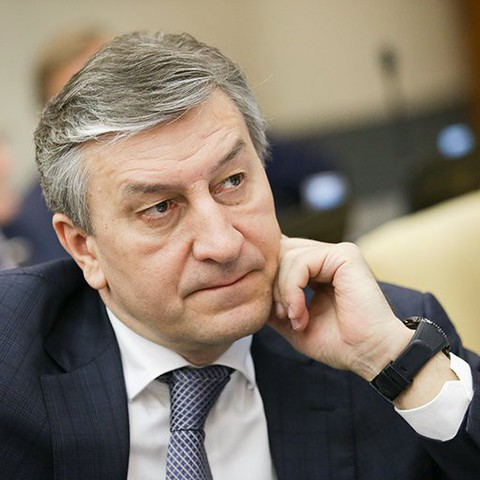

Member of the State Duma (Party List Seat)
- In office 5 October 2016 – 14 April 2026
- Succeeded by: Alexander Bogomaz

Deputy Minister of Finance
- In office 5 June 2014 – 30 September 2016
- Prime Minister: Dmitry Medvedev

Deputy Minister of Health
- In office 4 September 2013 – 5 June 2014
- Prime Minister: Dmitry Medvedev

Personal details
- Born: 17 February 1968 (age 58) Agryz, Tatar ASSR, USSR
- Party: United Russia
- Education: Kazan State Medical Institute; RANEPA; Moscow School of Management SKOLKOVO

Ayrat Zakievich Farrakhov (Russian: Айрат Закиевич Фаррахов; born 17 February 1968, Agryz, Tatar Autonomous Soviet Socialist Republic) is a Russian politician and a deputy of the State Duma (2016-2026).

In 2015 he was awarded a Doctor of Sciences in Medicine. From 1993 to 1995, he was the ward surgeon at the Kazan State Medical University department of surgery. From 1995 to 2006, he worked at the Republican Clinical Hospital of the Ministry of Health of the Republic of Tatarstan. In 2006 he was appointed the head of the Health Department of the executive committee of the city of Kazan. From October 2007 to September 2013, he was the Minister of Health of the Republic of Tatarstan. He left the post to become the Deputy Minister of Health of the Russian Federation. In 2014 he was appointed the Deputy Minister of Finance.

On 18 September 2016 he was elected deputy of the 7th State Duma on the party list of United Russia. He was re-elected in the September 2021 Russian legislative election and has served as a deputy of the 8th State Duma since.

== Sanctions ==
He is one of the members of the State Duma the United States Treasury sanctioned on 24 March 2022 in response to the 2022 Russian invasion of Ukraine.

He was sanctioned by the UK government in 2022 in relation to the Russo-Ukrainian War.

He is included in the sanctions lists of the Switzerland, Australia, Ukraine, Japan, and New Zealand.

== Family and Interests ==
Married, with three children.

Hobbies: sports and travel. In August 2017, he climbed Mount Elbrus (5,642 m) and placed on its summit the flag of the Republic of Tatarstan, as well as the flags of Kazan State Medical University and the Kazan Hospice. In 2018, he ascended the highest peak in Africa — Uhuru Peak (Mount Kilimanjaro, 5,895 m).
