= Klimovo, Cherepovetsky District, Vologda Oblast =

Klimovo Климово
- Village
- Location within Vologda Oblast Location within Russia
- Coordinates: 59°15′N 37°48′E
- Country: Russia
- Region: Vologda Oblast
- District: Cherepovetsky District
- Time zone: UTC+3:00

Klimovo (Russian: Климово) is a rural locality (a village) in Malechkinskoye Rural Settlement, Cherepovetsky District, Vologda Oblast, Russia. The population was 2 as of 2002.

== Geography ==
Klimovo is located 23 km (14 mi) northwest of Cherepovets (the district's administrative centre) by road. Starina is the nearest rural locality.
