= 2012 Russian gubernatorial elections =

← 2005	14 October 2012	2013 →

5 Heads of Federal Subjects from 83
- 2012 Russian regional elections: Gubernatorial Legislative

Russian gubernatorial elections in 2012 took place on 14 October in Amur, Bryansk, Belgorod, Novgorod and Ryazan oblasts.

The ballots in governors’ elections in the Amur, Belgorod and Ryazan regions had four names to choose from. The ballot in the Novgorod region contained three names. In total, 17 candidates from six political parties competed for five governor seats. The parties represented the State Duma's "big four" United Russia, the Communists, the Liberal-Democratic Party and A Just Russia, as well as Right Cause and Patriots of Russia. Candidates from LDPR competed in four regions, those from the Communist Party of the Russian Federation in three, Right Course and Patriots of Russia were represented in two regions, and A Just Russia in one.

== Race summary ==
Federal Subject	Incumbent	Party	Incumbent status	Candidates
Amur Oblast	Oleg Kozhemyako	United Russia	Term-expiring	✓ Oleg Kozhemyako (UR) 77.28%; Roman Kobyzov (CPRF) 9.99%; Ivan Abramov (LDPR) 8.12%
Belgorod Oblast	Yevgeny Savchenko	United Russia	Acting	✓ Yevgeny Savchenko (UR) 77.64%; Irina Gorkova (LDPR) 12.43%
Bryansk Oblast	Nikolay Denin	United Russia	Term-expiring	✓ Nikolay Denin (UR) 65.22%; Vadim Potomsky (CPRF) 30.83%
Novgorod Oblast	Sergey Mitin	United Russia	Acting	✓ Sergey Mitin (UR) 75.95%; Nikolay Zakharov (PR) 10.63%; Viktor Mikhailov (LDPR) 10.43%
Ryazan Oblast	Oleg Kovalyov	United Russia	Acting	✓ Oleg Kovalyov (UR) 64.43%; Vladimir Fedotkin (CPRF) 21.92%; Aleksandr Sherin (LDPR) 9.01%
