= Klimovo, Furmanovsky District, Ivanovo Oblast =

Klimovo Климово
- Village
- Location within Ivanovo Oblast Location within Russia
- Coordinates: 57°10′N 41°05′E
- Country: Russia
- Region: Ivanovo Oblast
- District: Furmanovsky District
- Time zone: UTC+3:00

Klimovo (Russian: Климово) is a rural locality (a village) in Furmanovsky District, Ivanovo Oblast, Russia. Population: 12 (2010 census);

== Geography ==
This rural locality is located 9 kilometres (5.6 mi) from Furmanov (the district's administrative centre), 21 kilometres (13 mi) from Ivanovo (capital of Ivanovo Oblast) and 262 kilometres (163 mi) from Moscow. Vyazovskoye is the nearest rural locality.
