= Bryansk State Technical University =

Public university in Russia

- Брянский государственный технический университет
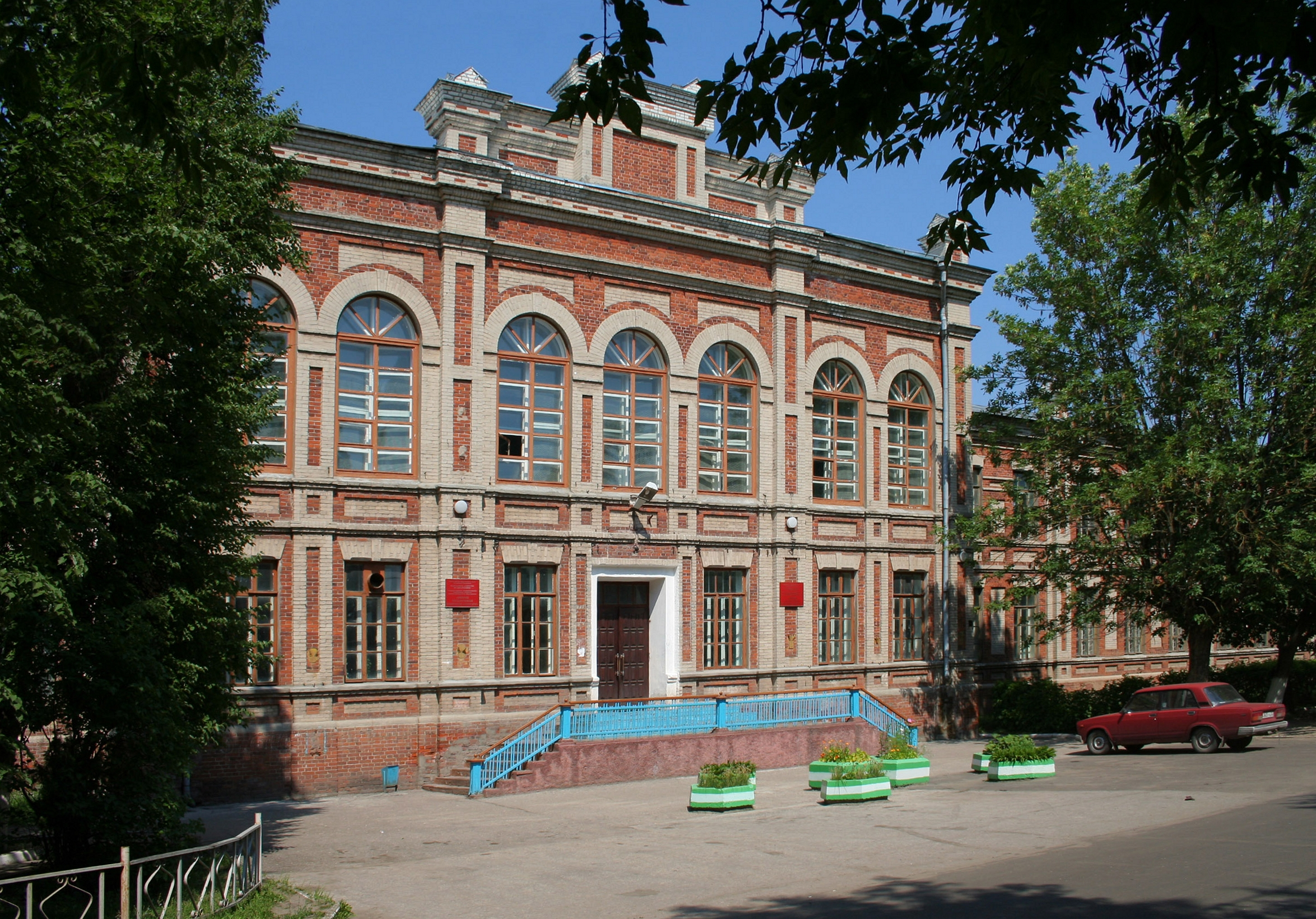
- Type: Public
- Location: Bryansk, Russia; 53°18′19″N 34°18′20″E
- Campus: Urban
- Nickname: BGTU (Russian: БГТУ)
- Website: www.tu-bryansk.ru

Bryansk State Technical University (Russian: Брянский государственный технический университет) is a higher education institution in the city of Bryansk, Russia. Education is provided in 26 departments, 22 of which are graduate departments. The research focus includes 14 areas in 6 fields.

== History ==
In 1922, the Bezhitsky Workers' Faculty was founded at the Krasny Profintern plant.

In 1929 the Bezhitsky Machine-Building Institute was founded was organized by the decree of the Main Directorate of Higher and Secondary Technical Educational Institutions (Russian: ГлавВТУЗ) of the Supreme Council of the National Economy of the USSR on November 23, 1929, and included among the institutions of higher education by Resolution No. 40/237 of the All-Russian Central Executive Committee of the All-Russian Congress of Soviets on July 23, 1930, on the basis of the workers' faculty to train mechanical engineering engineers. Students were recruited in the following specialties: hot and cold metalworking, foundry, locomotive engineering, machine tool building and refrigeration units, lifting and transport units, and railcar building.

On November 5, 1934, the institute was awarded the Red Banner as the "best forge of proletarian cadres".

In 1936 due to the renaming of Bezhitsa to Ordzhonikidzegrad, the institute was renamed the Ordzhonikidzegrad Machine-Building Institute.

On August 24, 1941, an order was issued to evacuate the first echelon of the university to the Urals, to Nizhny Tagil in the Sverdlovsk Oblast.

In 1944 Bezhitsa Mechanical Engineering Institute. In 1945 the Bezhitsa Institute of Transport Engineering was.

By the Decree of the Presidium of the Supreme Soviet of the RSFSR of June 2, 1956 and the Decree of the Minister of Higher Education of the USSR of July 13, 1956, the Bezhitsk Institute of Transport Engineering was renamed the Bryansk Institute of Transport Engineering due to Bezhitsa's incorporation into Bryansk.

In 1967 BITM was first granted the right to accept candidate dissertations for defense and award candidate degrees. The first dissertation council was established.

On November 2, 1979, by Decree of the Presidium of the Supreme Soviet of the USSR, the Bryansk Institute of Transport Engineering was awarded the Order of the Badge of Honor "for its services in training qualified specialists for the national economy and in the development of science and technology."

1992 the Bryansk Regional Center for New Information Technologies was established on the basis of the BITM automated control system.

In 1995 the university passed the certification of the expert commission of the Association of Technical Universities of Russia and, by order of the State Committee for Higher Education of December 28, 1995, was renamed Bryansk State Technical University.

On June 25, 2008, the Federal State Educational Institution of Secondary Professional Education, the Polytechnic College of BSTU was incorporated into Bryansk State Technical University as a structural division.

On June 3, 2010, by order of the Minister of Education and Science, a branch of the Federal State Budgetary Educational Institution of Higher Professional Education "Bryansk State Technical University" was established in Lyudinovo, Kaluga Oblast.

On May 17, 2011, by order of the Minister of Education and Science, the state educational institution of higher professional education "Bryansk State Technical University" was renamed the federal state budgetary educational institution of higher professional education "Bryansk State Technical University".

As of 2024, BSTU has 712 employees and faculty members.
