= Klimovo, Velikoustyugsky District, Vologda Oblast =

Klimovo Климово
- Village
- Location within Vologda Oblast Location within Russia
- Coordinates: 60°40′N 45°55′E
- Country: Russia
- Region: Vologda Oblast
- District: Velikoustyugsky District
- Time zone: UTC+3:00

Klimovo (Russian: Климово) is a rural locality (a village) in Samotovinskoye Rural Settlement, Velikoustyugsky District, Vologda Oblast, Russia. The population was 3 as of 2002.

== Geography ==
Klimovo is located 37 km southwest of Veliky Ustyug (the district's administrative centre) by road. Stepanitsa is the nearest rural locality.
