= Nikolay Denin =

Russian politician (born 1958)

- Николай Денин
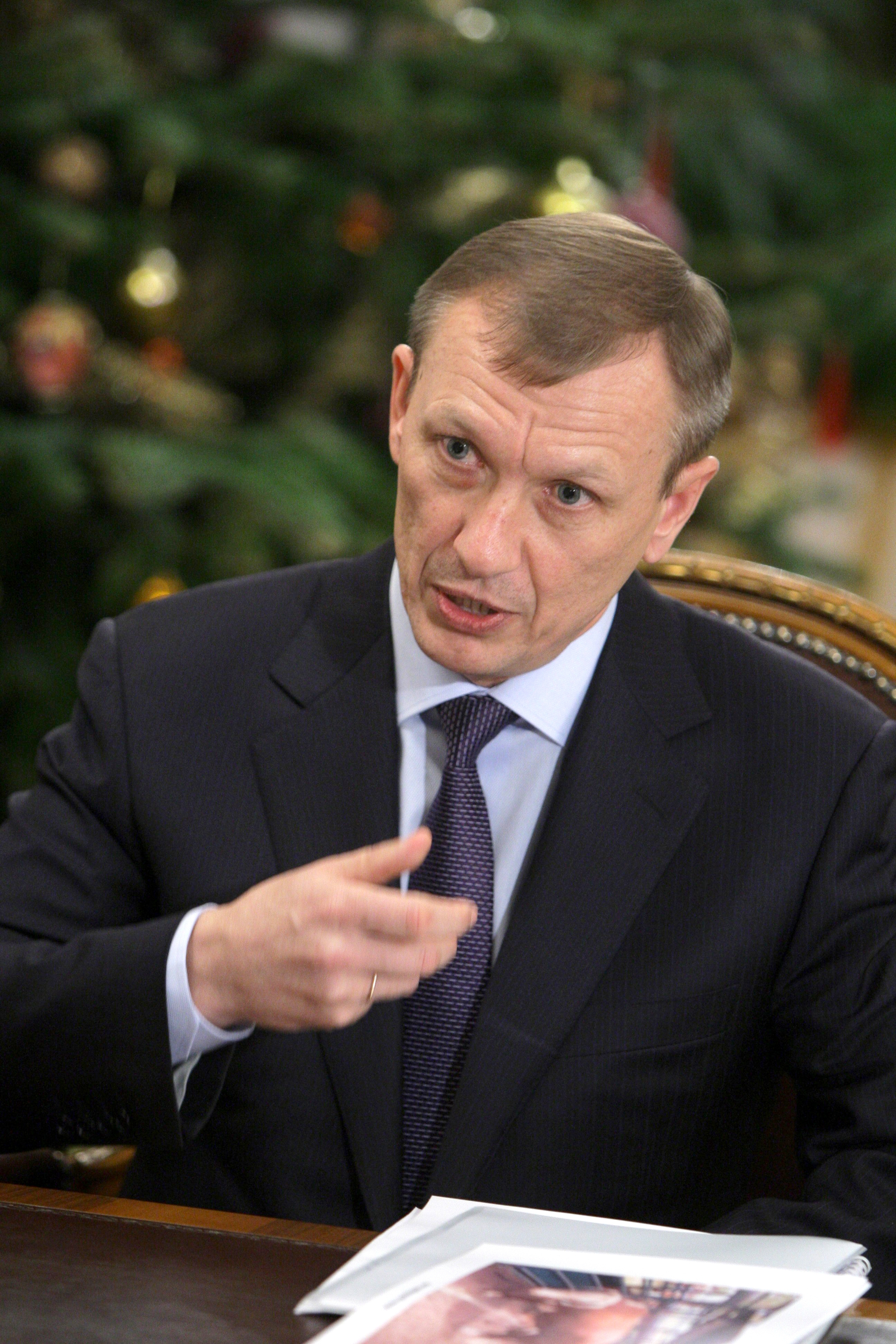
- Denin in 2010

Governor of Bryansk Oblast
- In office December 28, 2004 – September 9, 2014
- Preceded by: Yury Lodkin
- Succeeded by: Alexander Bogomaz

Personal details
- Born: May 15, 1958 (age 68) Domashovo, Bryansk Oblast, RSFSR, Soviet Union
- Party: United Russia
- Spouse: Nadezhda Ivanovna Denina
- Children: Aleksandr; Tatyana
- Education: Russian Presidential Academy of National Economy and Public Administration
- Profession: Farmer

Nikolay Vasilyevich Denin (Russian: Николай Васильевич Денин; born 15 May 1958) is a Russian politician who served as the governor of Bryansk Oblast from 2004 to 2014. He is a member of the United Russia party.

== Career ==
He won his election in 2004 by a wide margin after the incumbent governor, Yury Lodkin was removed from the ballot by a court, just days before the vote. Denin had previously worked as the head of a chicken processing plant and was elected to the State Duma from Bryansk constituency in Bryansk Oblast by the United Russia party in December 2003.

In the 2012 Russian gubernatorial election, he was re-elected to the governor of Bryansk before being succeeded by Alexander Bogomaz as acting governor in 2014.

In 2014 Nikolai Denin was removed from the post of governor of the Bryansk region by decree of Russian President Vladimir Putin due to loss of trust.

== Awards ==
- Order of the Badge of Honour
- Order of Honour
- Order of Friendship
- Honored Worker of Agriculture of the Russian Federation (1994) — for achievements in the field of agriculture and many years of conscientious work
- Laureate of the national award "Russian of the Year" (2004) — for dedicated service to the ideals of a just social order
- Gratitude of the President of the Russian Federation (2011) — for merits in the preparation and holding of events with the participation of the President of the Russian Federation
- Order of St. Sergius of Radonezh, 2nd class (Russian Orthodox Church, 2012) — in recognition of assistance in the construction of the Cathedral of the Holy Trinity in Bryansk
