= Klimovo, Kirzhachsky District, Vladimir Oblast =

Klimovo Климово
- Village
- Location within Vladimir Oblast Location within Russia
- Coordinates: 56°15′N 38°47′E
- Country: Russia
- Region: Vladimir Oblast
- District: Kirzhachsky District
- Time zone: UTC+3:00

Klimovo (Russian: Климово) is a rural locality (a village) in Gorkinskoye Rural Settlement, Kirzhachsky District, Vladimir Oblast, Russia. The population was 68 as of 2010. There are 4 streets.

== Geography ==
Klimovo is located on the Sherna River, 15 km north of Kirzhach (the district's administrative centre) by road. Ryazanki is the nearest rural locality.
