= Vadim Dengin =

Russian politician (born 1980)

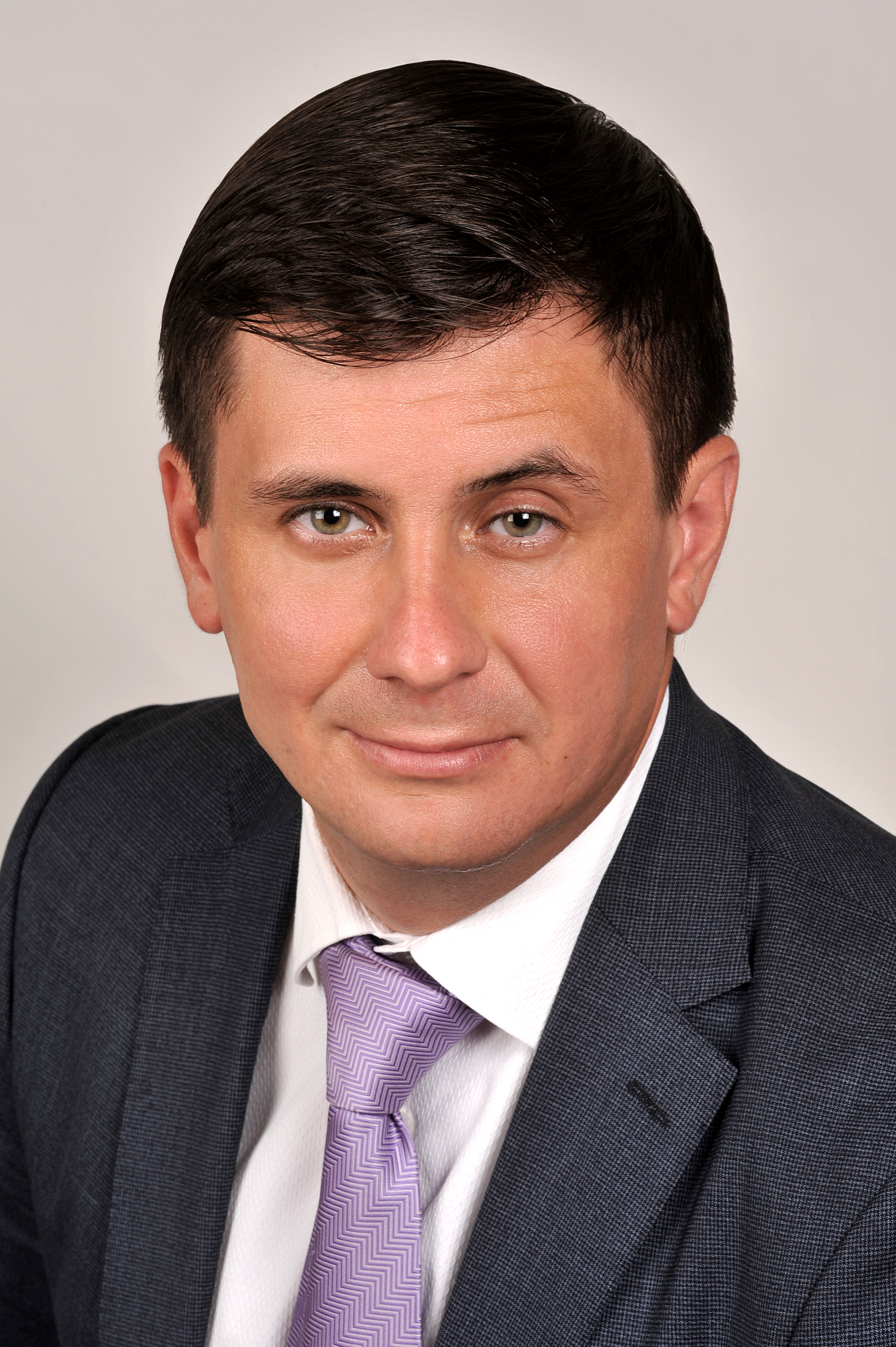
- Dengin in 2015

Russian Federation Senator from Bryansk Oblast
- Incumbent
- Assumed office 23 September 2020
- Preceded by: Sergey Kalashnikov

Personal details
- Born: Vadim Yevgenyevich Dengin; 23 September 1980 (age 45) Obninsk, USSR
- Citizenship: Russian
- Party: Liberal Democratic Party of Russia
- Occupation: Politician

Vadim Yevgenyevich Dengin (Russian: Вадим Евгеньевич Деньгин; born on 23 September 1980) is a Russian politician. He was a deputy of the State Duma of the Russian Federation. He is a member of the Liberal Democratic Party of Russia.

== Early political career ==
Dengin was born in Obninsk, in the Soviet Union. Beginning in 1997, Dengin worked as a teacher at the Obninsk Center of Extracurricular Activities and later in the youth wing of the Liberal Democratic Party of Russia. In 2004, he graduated from the Moscow State University of Economics, Statistics, and Informatics. He was a senior expert of the State Duma Committee on Youth Affairs.

He was a candidate for the Governor of Kaluga Oblast on behalf of the Liberal Democratic Party of Russia on 13 September 2015 gubernatorial election. He came in third place with 8.36 percent of the vote.

== Legislative career ==
Dengin has spoken strongly in favor of expanding the regulative powers of the Federal Service for Supervision in the Sphere of Telecom, Information Technologies and Mass Communications (Roskomnadzor) over the internet. In October 2015, Dengin, and fellow deputies Aleksandr Yushchenko of the Communist Party and Vadim Kharlov of A Just Russia, introduced an amendment to the Administrative Code which would have obliged media organizations to disclose foreign funds to Roskomnadzor within 30 days.

=== Sanctions ===
He was sanctioned by the UK government in 2022 in relation to the Russo-Ukrainian War.

== Personal life ==
He is married and has three daughters.
