= Starodubsky District =

Starodubsky District Стародубский район (Russian)
- District
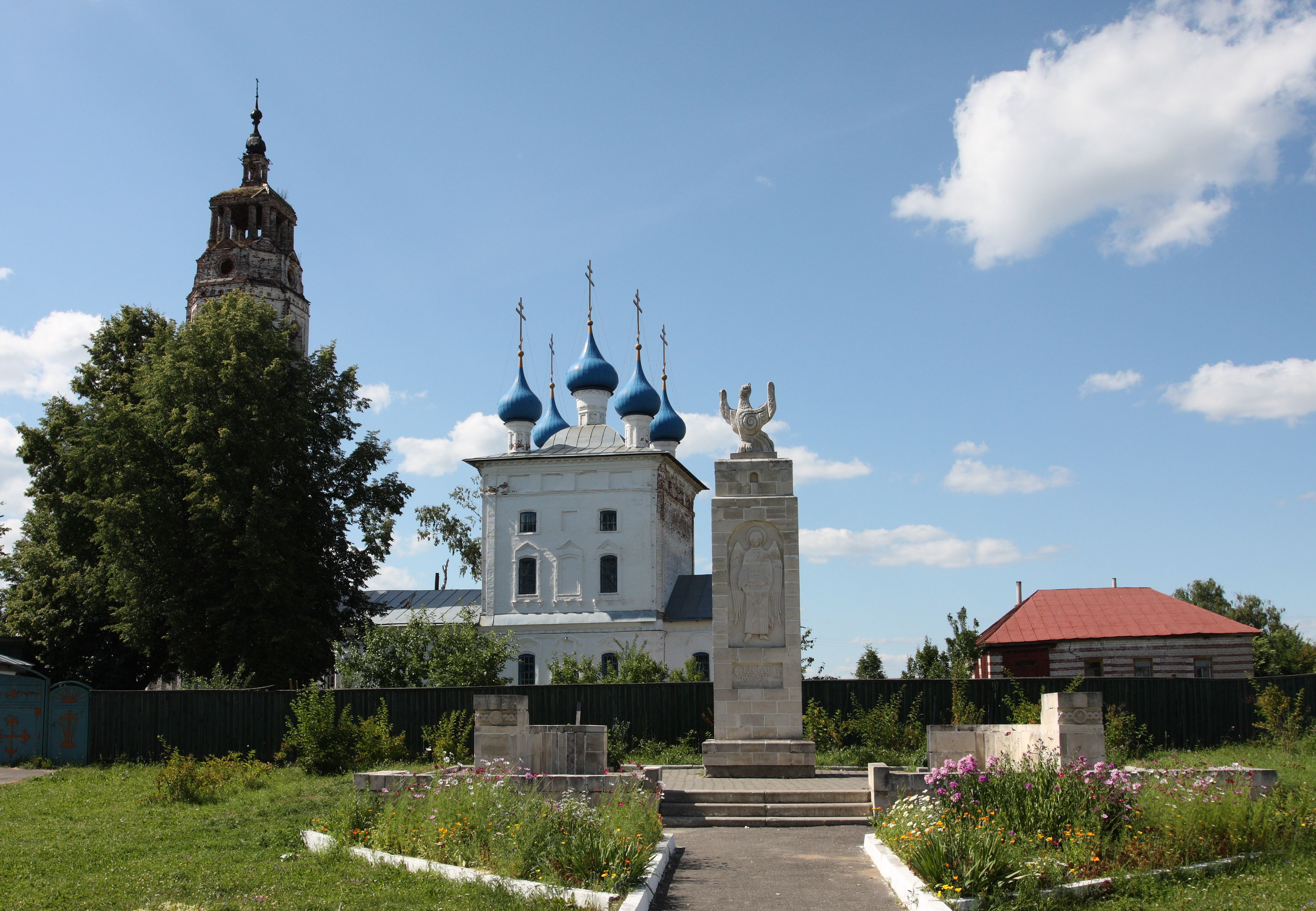
- Starodub

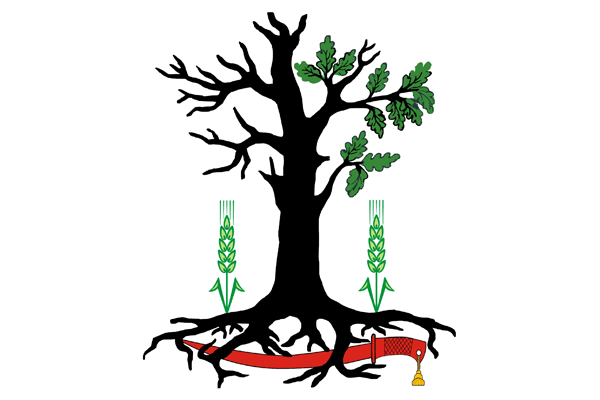
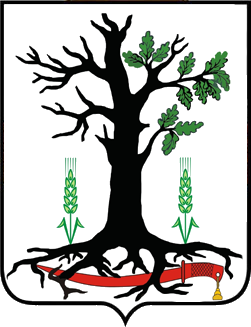
- Flag Coat of arms
- Location of Starodubsky District in Bryansk Oblast
- Coordinates: 52°35′N 32°46′E
- Country: Russia
- Federal subject: Bryansk Oblast
- Established: 1 October 1929
- Administrative center: Starodub

Area
  - Total: 1,760 km^{2} (680 sq mi)

Population (2010 Census)
  - Total: 40,414
  - Density: 23.0/km^{2} (59.5/sq mi)
  - Urban: 47.0%
  - Rural: 53.0%

Administrative structure
  - Administrative divisions: 10 Rural administrative okrugs
  - Inhabited localities: 149 rural localities

Municipal structure
  - Municipally incorporated as: Starodubsky Municipal District
  - Municipal divisions: 0 urban settlements, 10 rural settlements
- Website: http://adminstarrayon.ru/

Starodubsky District (Russian: Староду́бский райо́н) is an administrative and municipal district (raion), one of the twenty-seven in Bryansk Oblast, Russia. It is located in the south of the oblast. The area of the district is 1,760 square kilometers (680 sq mi). Its administrative center is the town of Starodub (which is not administratively a part of the district). Population: 35,404 (2021 census); 40,414 (2010 census); 44,573 (2002 Census); 51,326 (1989 Soviet census). The population of Starodub accounts for 50.0% of the district's total population.

== Administrative and municipal divisions ==
Within the framework of administrative divisions, Starodubsky District is one of the twenty-seven in the oblast. The town of Starodub serves as its administrative center, despite being incorporated separately as an urban administrative okrug—an administrative unit with the status equal to that of the districts.

As a municipal division, the district is incorporated as Starodubsky Municipal District. Starodub Urban Administrative Okrug is incorporated separately from the district as Starodub Urban Okrug.
