= Bryansk Oblast Duma =

Regional parliament of Bryansk Oblast, Russia

Bryansk Oblast Duma Брянская областная дума
- 7th legislature

Type
- Type: Unicameral

Leadership
- Chairman: Valentin Subbott, United Russia since 20 October 2020

Structure
- Seats: 60
- Political groups: United Russia (51) LDPR (5); CPRF (2); SRZP (1) Rodina (1)

Elections
- Voting system: Mixed
- Last election: 6-8 September 2024
- Next election: 2029

Meeting place
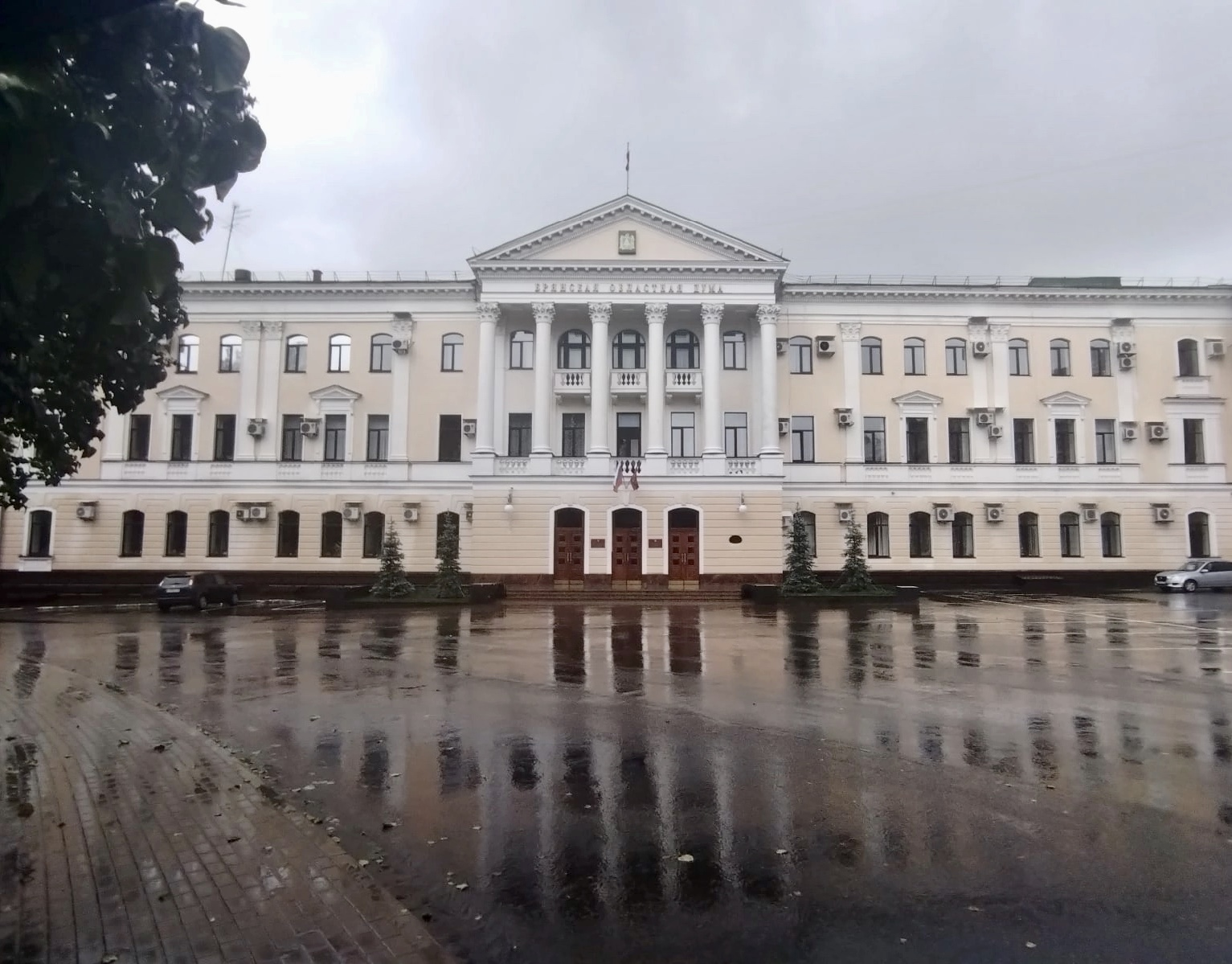
- 2 Karl Marx Square, Bryansk

Website
- duma32.ru

The Bryansk Oblast Duma (Russian: Брянская областная дума, romanized: Bryanskaya oblastnaya duma) is the regional parliament of Bryansk Oblast, a federal subject of Russia. A total of 60 deputies are elected for five-year terms.

== Elections ==
=== 2019 ===
Party	%	Seats
United Russia	63.71	48
Liberal Democratic Party of Russia	12.89	5
Communist Party of the Russian Federation	12.27	4
A Just Russia	5.12	2
Independent	—	1
Civic Platform	4.04	0
Registered voters/turnout	58.45	

=== 2024 ===
Party	%	Seats
United Russia	68.69	51
Liberal Democratic Party of Russia	13.28	5
Communist Party of the Russian Federation	8.35	2
A Just Russia	3.51	1
Registered voters/turnout	57.22	
