= Mikhail Kislyakov =

Russian politician

Mikhail Kislyakov MP
- Михаил Кисляков
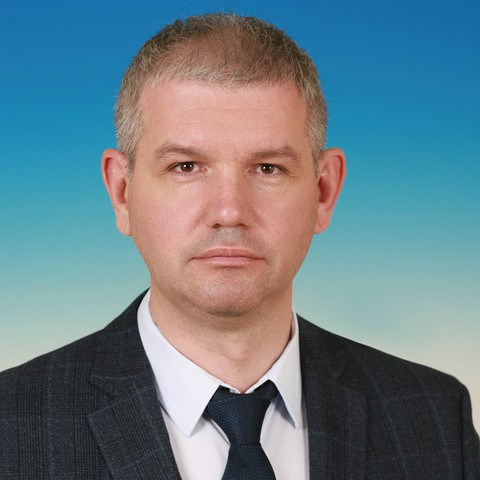
- official portrait, circa 2021

Member of the State Duma
- Incumbent
- Assumed office 12 October 2021
- Preceded by: Multi-member district
- Constituency: Nenets (No.221) (2026-); Party List (2021-2026)

Member of the Arkhangelsk Oblast Assembly of Deputies
- In office 20 September 2018 – 12 October 2021

Personal details
- Born: 18 November 1975 (age 50) Krasnoye, Zapolyarny District, Nenets National Okrug, Russian SFSR, Soviet Union
- Party: United Russia
- Children: 3
- Education: Northern State Medical University; RANEPA
- Occupation: business manager

Mikhail Leonidovich Kislyakov (Russian: Михаил Леонидович Кисляков; born 18 November 1975, Krasnoe, Zapolyarny District) is a Russian politician and businessman. A member of United Russia, he has served as a member of the State Duma since 2021.

== Early life and education ==
Mikhail Kislyakov was born on November 18, 1975, in the settlement of Krasnoye, Zapolyarny District, Nenets Autonomous Okrug. He was engaged in his mandatory military service from 1993 to 1995. Following his demobilization, he enrolled at the Northern State Medical University in Arkhangelsk, graduating in 2000 with a degree in management.

== Business career ==
In 1998, he became the General Director of Argus LLC, and from 2003 to 2021, he served as the chairman of the agricultural production cooperative "Fishery Collective Farm 'Zapolyarye'".

== Political career ==
In 2018, Kislyakov was elected to the Arkhangelsk Oblast Assembly of Deputies as a member of United Russia. He was elected from the party-list seat

Kislyakov would run during the 2021 Russian legislative election, seeking the Arkhangelsk constituency. He was defeated in the United Russia primary by Aleksandr Spiridonov; and failed to win the seat. However; Kislyakov would secure a seat from the at-large electoral district as an alternate for a member of the United Russia party list. In the 8th State Duma, Kiskyalov was a member of the Regional and Local Government committee. On October 30, 2024, he began sitting on the Committee on Health.

In the 2026 Russian legislative election, Kiskyalov would file to run for the Nenets constituency in the Nenets Autonomous Okrug. The regional group of United Russia selected him to be their nominee. In the general election he was successfully elected to the seat with 42.25% of the vote; defeating Mikhail Rayn of the Communist Party of the Russian Federation, Lyudmila Taybarey of the Liberal Democratic Party, and Tatyana Antipina of A Just Russia. He succeeded fellow United Russia member Sergey Kotkin for the seat.

== Sanctions ==
Kislyakov, alongside other State Duma members, has been sanctioned by the United States Treasury since 24 March 2022, in response to the 2022 Russian invasion of Ukraine.

Similarly, the United Kingdom included him in its sanctions list on March 11, 2022, citing his role in the Russo-Ukrainian conflict.

== Personal life ==
Kislyakov is married and has three children.
