= 2023 Arkhangelsk Oblast Assembly of Deputies election =

← 2018	8–10 September 2023	2028 →
- Turnout: 28.02%
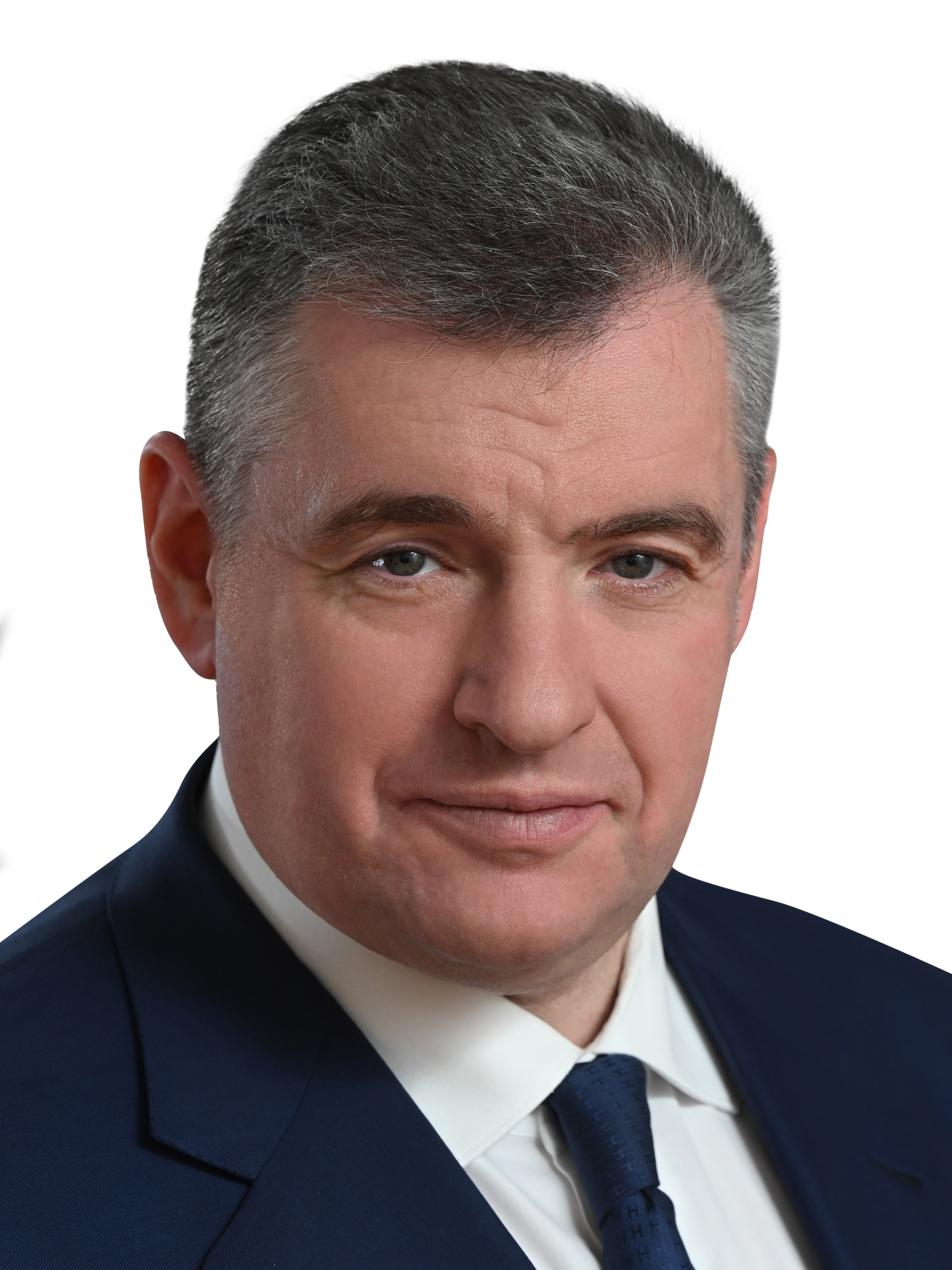

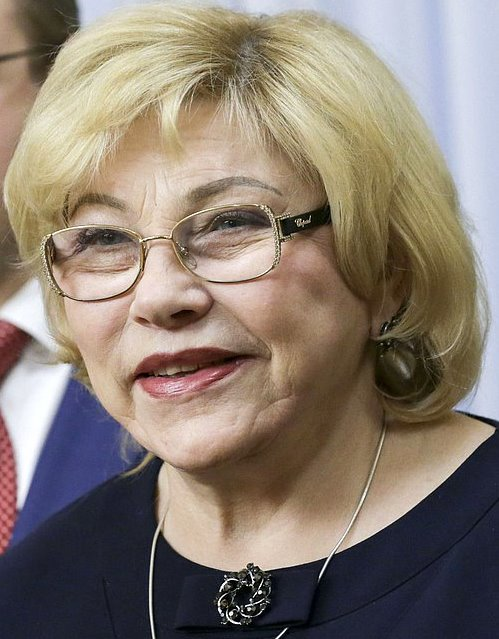

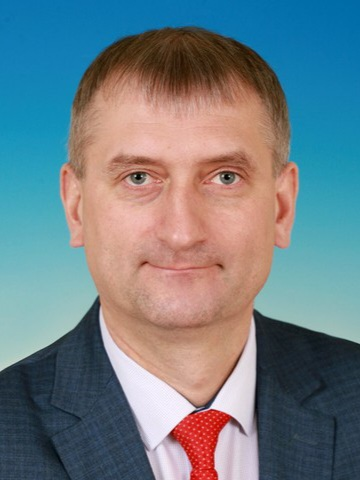
	Majority party	Minority party	Third party
			CPRF
Candidate	Alexander Tsybulsky	Leonid Slutsky	Aleksandr Grevtsov
Leader	Dmitry Medvedev	Leonid Slutsky	Gennady Zyuganov
Party	United Russia	LDPR	CPRF
Last election	25 seats, 31.59%	9 seats, 23.45%	7 seats, 18.82%
Seats won	36	4	3
Seat change	▲11	▼5	▼4
Popular vote	125,451	37,198	27,294
Percentage	50.18%	14.88%	10.92%
Swing	▲18.59%	▼8.57%	▼7.90%
	Fourth party	Fifth party	Sixth party
			CPCR
Candidate	Yelena Drapeko	Grigory Shilkin	Sergey Orekhanov
Leader	Sergey Mironov	Aleksey Nechayev	Sergey Malinkovich
Party	SR-ZP	New People	Communists of Russia
Last election	5 seats, 15.06%	Did not exist	0 seats, 4.03%
Seats won	3	1	0
Seat change	▼2	Did not exist	Steady
Popular vote	22,464	13,017	8,686
Percentage	8.99%	5.21%	3.47%
Swing	▼6.07%	Did not exist	▼0.56%

The 2023 Arkhangelsk Oblast Assembly of Deputies election took place on 8–10 September 2023, on common election day, coinciding with 2023 Nenets Autonomous Okrug Assembly of Deputies election. All 47 seats in the Assembly of Deputies were up for reelection.

== Electoral system ==
Under current election laws, the Assembly of Deputies is elected for a term of five years, with parallel voting. 23 seats are elected by party-list proportional representation with a 5% electoral threshold, with the other half elected in 24 single-member constituencies by first-past-the-post voting. Constituency №1 covers the entirety of the Nenets Autonomous Okrug. Seats in the proportional part are allocated using the Imperiali quota, modified to ensure that every party list, which passes the threshold, receives at least one mandate.

== Candidates ==
=== Party lists ===
To register regional lists of candidates, parties need to collect 0.5% of signatures of all registered voters in Arkhangelsk Oblast.

The following parties were relieved from the necessity to collect signatures:

- United Russia
- Communist Party of the Russian Federation
- A Just Russia — Patriots — For Truth
- Liberal Democratic Party of Russia
- New People
- Communists of Russia
- Rodina

№	Party	Oblast-wide list	Candidates	Territorial groups	Status
1	United Russia	Alexander Tsybulsky	89	24	Registered
2	New People	Grigory Shilkin • Andrey Karakin • Andrey Trusov	29	23	Registered
3	Communists of Russia	Sergey Orekhanov	24	20	Registered
4	Rodina	Vitaly Grishayev • ~~Ilya Azovsky~~ • Aleksey Kryukov	26	22	Registered
5	The Greens	Yelena Ostapenko • Ilya Nasekin • Artyom Smolokurov	26	22	Registered
6	Communist Party	Aleksandr Grevtsov • Nadezhda Vinogradova • Natalya Ivashina	54	21	Registered
7	Liberal Democratic Party	Leonid Slutsky • Aleksandr Fedorkov • Georgy Gubanov	45	24	Registered
8	A Just Russia – For Truth	Yelena Drapeko • Oleg Chernenko	67	24	Registered

New People and Russian Ecological Party "The Greens" will take part in Arkhangelsk Oblast legislative election for the first time since last election.

=== Single-mandate constituencies ===
24 single-mandate constituencies were formed in Arkhangelsk Oblast. To register candidates in single-mandate constituencies need to collect 3% of signatures of registered voters in the constituency.

Number of candidates in single-mandate constituencies
Party	Candidates	
Party	Nominated	Registered
United Russia	24	24
Liberal Democratic Party	22	20
Communist Party	21	20
A Just Russia — For Truth	23	21
Communists of Russia	17	16
Rodina	10	9
New People	15	12
Independent	2	0
Total	134	122

== Results ==
=== Results by party lists ===
Summary of the 8–10 September 2023 Arkhangelsk Oblast Assembly of Deputies election results
Party	Party list					Constituency		Total	
Party	Votes	%	±pp	Seats	+/–	Seats	+/–	Seats	+/–
United Russia	125,451	50.18	▲18.59%	15	▲6	21	▲5	36	▲11
Liberal Democratic Party	37,198	14.88	▼8.57%	3	▼3	1	▼2	4	▼5
Communist Party	27,294	10.92	▼7.90%	2	▼3	1	▼1	3	▼4
A Just Russia — For Truth	22,464	8.99	▼6.07%	2	▼1	1	▼1	3	▼2
New People	13,017	5.21	New	1	New	0	New	1	New
Communists of Russia	8,686	3.47	▼0.56%	0	Steady	0	Steady	0	Steady
The Greens	5,255	2.10	New	0	New	–	–	0	New
Rodina	4,353	1.74	▼1.98%	0	Steady	0	Steady	0	Steady
Invalid ballots	6,269	2.51	▼0.81%	—	—	—	—	—	—
Total	249,992	100.00	—	23	Steady	24	Steady	47	Steady
Turnout	249,992	28.02	▼1.31%	—	—	—	—	—	—
Registered voters	892,224	100.00	—	—	—	—	—	—	—

Yekaterina Prokopyeva (United Russia) was re-elected as Chairwoman of the Assembly of Deputies, while assemblymember Ivan Novikov (United Russia) was appointed to the Federation Council, replacing retiring incumbent Viktor Novozhilov (United Russia).

=== Results in single-member constituencies ===
==== District 1 ====
Summary of the 8–10 September 2023 Arkhangelsk Oblast Assembly of Deputies election in District 1
Candidate	Party	Votes	%
Aleksandr Korol	United Russia	5,363	43.12%
Aleksey Kanyukov	Communist Party	3,100	24.93%
Andrey Ruzhnikov	Rodina	2,511	20.19%
Oleg Breskalenko	A Just Russia — For Truth	699	5.62%
Total		12,437	100%

==== District 2 ====
Summary of the 8–10 September 2023 Arkhangelsk Oblast Assembly of Deputies election in District 2
Candidate	Party	Votes	%
Yevgeny Ukhin (incumbent)	United Russia	3,250	44.29%
Danil Vlasov	New People	983	13.40%
Yury Sazonov	Liberal Democratic Party	954	13.00%
Anatoly Zaytsev	Communist Party	701	9.55%
Viktoria Fedotova	Communists of Russia	482	6.57%
Vitaly Malyshin	Rodina	397	5.41%
Total		7,338	100%

==== District 3 ====
Summary of the 8–10 September 2023 Arkhangelsk Oblast Assembly of Deputies election in District 3
Candidate	Party	Votes	%
Oleg Chernenko (incumbent)	A Just Russia — For Truth	3,281	34.27%
Ilya Ivankin	United Russia	3,219	33.63%
Yelena Sidorova	Liberal Democratic Party	987	10.31%
Rostislav Vasilyev	Communist Party	607	6.34%
Anastasia Komissarova	New People	606	6.33%
Maksim Vasilyev	Communists of Russia	456	4.76%
Total		9,573	100%

==== District 4 ====
Summary of the 8–10 September 2023 Arkhangelsk Oblast Assembly of Deputies election in District 4
Candidate	Party	Votes	%
Aleksandr Frolov (incumbent)	United Russia	5,027	54.08%
Svetlana Alefirenko	A Just Russia — For Truth	1,080	11.62%
Aleksey Kryukov	Rodina	845	9.09%
Anna Mikhaleva	Communists of Russia	834	8.97%
Eldar Ustinov	Communist Party	646	6.95%
Vladislav Virivsky	New People	530	5.70%
Total		9,296	100%

==== District 5 ====
Summary of the 8–10 September 2023 Arkhangelsk Oblast Assembly of Deputies election in District 5
Candidate	Party	Votes	%
Viktor Zarya (incumbent)	United Russia	4,599	45.95%
Inna Plotnikova	New People	1,517	15.16%
Aleksandr Grevtsov	Communist Party	1,299	12.98%
Marina Gruzdeva	Liberal Democratic Party	767	7.66%
Viktoria Kopytova	A Just Russia — For Truth	537	5.37%
Vadim Baranov	Rodina	484	4.84%
Gennady Gnezdov	Communists of Russia	434	4.34%
Total		10,009	100%

==== District 6 ====
Summary of the 8–10 September 2023 Arkhangelsk Oblast Assembly of Deputies election in District 6
Candidate	Party	Votes	%
Nadezhda Vinogradova (incumbent)	Communist Party	3,013	35.02%
Kristina Sablina	United Russia	2,372	27.57%
Ivan Sadula	Liberal Democratic Party	1,384	16.09%
Yury Nesterenko	A Just Russia — For Truth	917	10.66%
Olga Otchenash	Communists of Russia	541	6.29%
Total		8,603	100%

==== District 7 ====
Summary of the 8–10 September 2023 Arkhangelsk Oblast Assembly of Deputies election in District 7
Candidate	Party	Votes	%
Vladimir Samofalov	United Russia	3,607	40.85%
Yevgeny Kornyukh	A Just Russia — For Truth	1,637	18.54%
Polina Borodina	Liberal Democratic Party	1,224	13.86%
Mikhail Derbin	Communist Party	1,005	11.38%
Inna Pushkina	New People	610	6.91%
Vitaly Grishayev	Rodina	272	3.08%
Total		8,830	100%

==== District 8 ====
Summary of the 8–10 September 2023 Arkhangelsk Oblast Assembly of Deputies election in District 8
Candidate	Party	Votes	%
Mikhail Avaliani (incumbent)	United Russia	3,649	39.62%
Olga Novikova	A Just Russia — For Truth	1,972	21.41%
Mikhail Shishov	Communist Party	1,277	13.87%
Mikhail Blokhin	Liberal Democratic Party	1,200	13.03%
Yevgeny Sanotsky	New People	563	6.11%
Total		9,210	100%

==== District 9 ====
Summary of the 8–10 September 2023 Arkhangelsk Oblast Assembly of Deputies election in District 9
Candidate	Party	Votes	%
Vladimir Sukharev (incumbent)	Liberal Democratic Party	3,902	42.10%
Aleksey Kukushkin	United Russia	2,874	31.01%
Artyom Sinitsyn	Communist Party	651	7.02%
Aleksandr Bolotov	New People	601	6.48%
Aleksandr Adayev	A Just Russia — For Truth	535	5.77%
Yelena Chertopolokhova	Communists of Russia	476	5.14%
Total		9,268	100%

==== District 10 ====
Summary of the 8–10 September 2023 Arkhangelsk Oblast Assembly of Deputies election in District 10
Candidate	Party	Votes	%
Igor Godzish	United Russia	2,994	35.47%
Nikolay Zelenovsky (incumbent)	Liberal Democratic Party	2,298	27.22%
Valery Serba	A Just Russia — For Truth	1,633	19.35%
Sergey Klyuyev	Communist Party	1,100	13.03%
Vagif Sheykhov	Communists of Russia	206	2.44%
Total		8,441	100%

==== District 11 ====
Summary of the 8–10 September 2023 Arkhangelsk Oblast Assembly of Deputies election in District 11
Candidate	Party	Votes	%
Oleg Loginov	United Russia	2,865	32.86%
Svetlana Morozova	A Just Russia — For Truth	2,142	24.57%
Aleksey Gashev	Liberal Democratic Party	1,424	16.33%
Anastasia Miklyayeva (incumbent)	Communist Party	1,282	14.71%
Olga Kotyuk	New People	548	6.29%
Sergey Sosnin	Communists of Russia	206	2.36%
Total		8,718	100%

==== District 12 ====
Summary of the 8–10 September 2023 Arkhangelsk Oblast Assembly of Deputies election in District 12
Candidate	Party	Votes	%
Aleksandr Dyatlov (incumbent)	United Russia	6,102	60.35%
Georgy Gubanov	Liberal Democratic Party	1,411	13.96%
Vladimir Kulakov	Communist Party	1,025	10.14%
Leona Patrakeyeva	New People	546	5.40%
Yury Kozlov	A Just Russia — For Truth	523	5.17%
Natalya Lobashova	Communists of Russia	297	2.94%
Total		10,111	100%

==== District 13 ====
Summary of the 8–10 September 2023 Arkhangelsk Oblast Assembly of Deputies election in District 13
Candidate	Party	Votes	%
Leonid Kaporikov	United Russia	3,314	36.53%
Ivan Popov	Communist Party	1,636	18.03%
Tatyana Veryuzhskaya	Liberal Democratic Party	1,546	17.04%
Irina Samoylova	New People	1,211	13.35%
Maria Turlapova	A Just Russia — For Truth	726	8.00%
Alyona Shilovskaya	Communists of Russia	384	4.23%
Total		9,073	100%

==== District 14 ====
Summary of the 8–10 September 2023 Arkhangelsk Oblast Assembly of Deputies election in District 14
Candidate	Party	Votes	%
Dmitry Gvozdev	United Russia	7,699	54.71%
Ilya Lukin	Liberal Democratic Party	2,018	14.34%
Aleksey Shmyrko	Communist Party	1,761	12.51%
Andrey Prokopyev	Rodina	909	6.46%
Yevgeny Pospelov	Communists of Russia	797	5.66%
Mikhail Kozlov	A Just Russia — For Truth	537	3.82%
Total		14,072	100%

==== District 15 ====
Summary of the 8–10 September 2023 Arkhangelsk Oblast Assembly of Deputies election in District 15
Candidate	Party	Votes	%
Oleg Zilberg	United Russia	5,439	46.78%
Natalya Ivashina	Communist Party	2,125	18.28%
Aleksandr Nosarev (incumbent)	A Just Russia — For Truth	1,047	9.01%
Mikhail Parfenychev	New People	993	8.54%
Vitaly Lobanov	Liberal Democratic Party	829	7.13%
Vasily Volkov	Rodina	798	6.86%
Total		11,626	100%

==== District 16 ====
Summary of the 8–10 September 2023 Arkhangelsk Oblast Assembly of Deputies election in District 16
Candidate	Party	Votes	%
Olga Poroshina (incumbent)	United Russia	4,077	45.89%
Yana Zhilina	Communist Party	1,857	20.90%
Aleksandr Kalinin	Liberal Democratic Party	1,617	18.20%
Dmitry Kolosov	Rodina	1,059	11.92%
Total		8,884	100%

==== District 17 ====
Summary of the 8–10 September 2023 Arkhangelsk Oblast Assembly of Deputies election in District 17
Candidate	Party	Votes	%
Oleg Sidorovsky	United Russia	3,965	35.51%
Svetlana Volskaya	Communist Party	2,532	22.68%
Margarita Makarovskaya	Liberal Democratic Party	1,906	17.07%
Ivan Zvezdin	A Just Russia — For Truth	1,813	16.24%
Natalia Gorbunova	Communists of Russia	686	6.14%
Total		11,166	100%

==== District 18 ====
Summary of the 8–10 September 2023 Arkhangelsk Oblast Assembly of Deputies election in District 18
Candidate	Party	Votes	%
Igor Chesnokov (incumbent)	United Russia	8,660	64.74%
Aleksey Karev	Liberal Democratic Party	2,438	18.23%
Oleg Kozachyok	A Just Russia — For Truth	1,943	14.52%
Total		13,377	100%

==== District 19 ====
Summary of the 8–10 September 2023 Arkhangelsk Oblast Assembly of Deputies election in District 19
Candidate	Party	Votes	%
Irina Frolova (incumbent)	United Russia	5,425	46.40%
Oksana Mishina	A Just Russia — For Truth	2,931	25.07%
Sergey Shabunin	Communists of Russia	2,812	24.05%
Total		11,693	100%

==== District 20 ====
Summary of the 8–10 September 2023 Arkhangelsk Oblast Assembly of Deputies election in District 20
Candidate	Party	Votes	%
Sergey Krasilnikov	United Russia	5,848	51.03%
Natalya Sinitskaya	Liberal Democratic Party	3,105	27.10%
Viktor Yudayev	Communists of Russia	1,219	10.64%
Vladislav Smelov	A Just Russia — For Truth	1,006	8.78%
Total		11,459	100%

==== District 21 ====
Summary of the 8–10 September 2023 Arkhangelsk Oblast Assembly of Deputies election in District 21
Candidate	Party	Votes	%
Sergey Emmanuilov (incumbent)	United Russia	6,499	52.53%
Tatyana Sedunova	A Just Russia — For Truth	2,544	20.56%
Aleksey Burylin	Communist Party	1,281	10.35%
Lyubov Kipayeva	Liberal Democratic Party	1,143	9.24%
Igor Korbut	New People	666	5.38%
Total		12,372	100%

==== District 22 ====
Summary of the 8–10 September 2023 Arkhangelsk Oblast Assembly of Deputies election in District 22
Candidate	Party	Votes	%
Mikhail Zavyalov	United Russia	5,780	58.01%
Yelena Ivanova	Communists of Russia	1,967	19.74%
Vadim Brovkin	Liberal Democratic Party	1,917	19.24%
Total		9,964	100%

==== District 23 ====
Summary of the 8–10 September 2023 Arkhangelsk Oblast Assembly of Deputies election in District 23
Candidate	Party	Votes	%
Ivan Novikov (incumbent)	United Russia	4,701	48.74%
Igor Titkov	Communist Party	2,119	21.97%
Sergey Sherstyannikov	A Just Russia — For Truth	1,663	17.24%
Anton Burkov	Communists of Russia	931	9.65%
Total		9,646	100%

==== District 24 ====
Summary of the 8–10 September 2023 Arkhangelsk Oblast Assembly of Deputies election in District 24
Candidate	Party	Votes	%
Yekaterina Prokopyeva (incumbent)	United Russia	6,127	58.69%
Vladimir Kulinka	Rodina	1,530	14.66%
Mikhail Zhigulevich	Communist Party	1,138	10.90%
Nikolay Parkhomenko	A Just Russia — For Truth	748	7.16%
Nikita Sidorov	Liberal Democratic Party	641	6.14%
Total		10,440	100%

== See also ==
- 2023 Russian regional elections
