= 2023 Nenets Autonomous Okrug Assembly of Deputies election =

- 8–10 September 2023
- Turnout: 37.65%
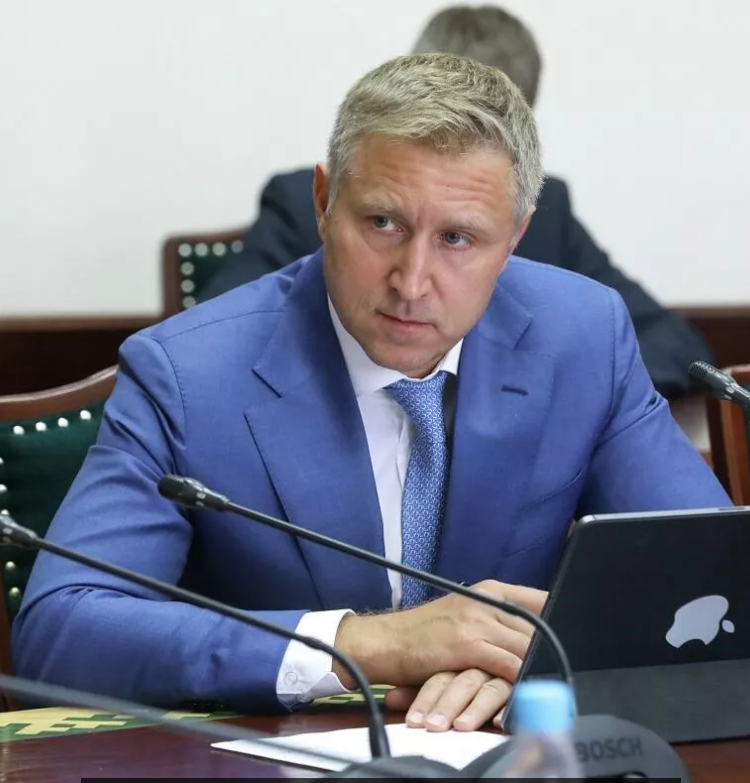

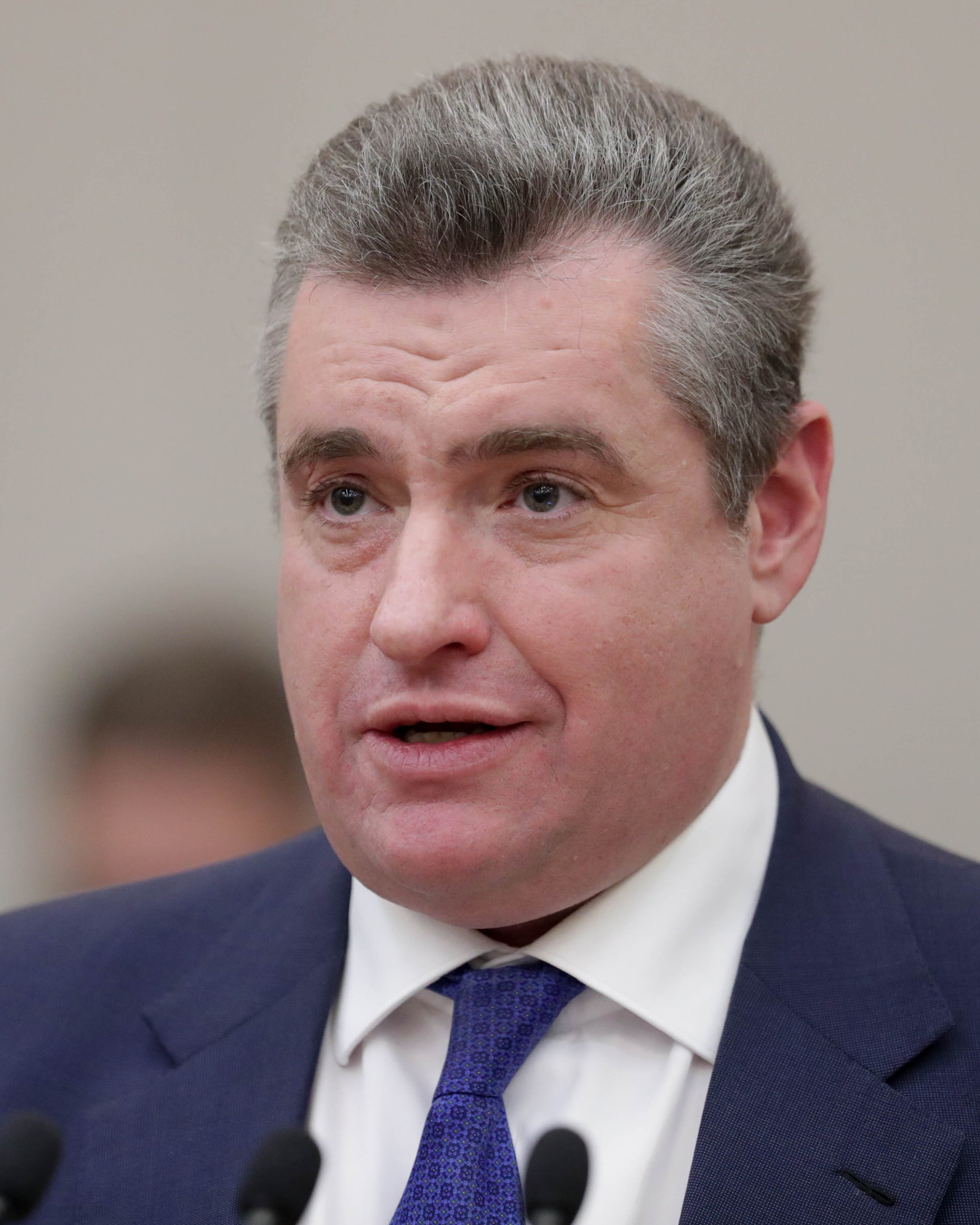
	Majority party	Minority party	Third party
		CPRF
Candidate	Yury Bezdudny	Mikhail Rayn	Leonid Slutsky
Leader	Dmitry Medvedev	Gennady Zyuganov	Leonid Slutsky
Party	United Russia	CPRF	LDPR
Last election	11 seats, 38.97%	3 seats, 23.80%	2 seats, 17.36%
Seats won	13	3	1
Seat change	▲2	Steady	▼1
Popular vote	5,646	3,182	1,276
Percentage	43.94%	24.76%	9.93%
Swing	▲4.97%	▲0.96%	▼7.43%
	Fourth party	Fifth party	Sixth party
	CPCR	Rodina	SR-ZP
Candidate	Nikolay Milovsky	Andrey Ruzhnikov	Natalya Lysakova
Leader	Sergey Malinkovich	Aleksey Zhuravlyov	Sergey Mironov
Party	Communists of Russia	Rodina	SR-ZP
Last election	1 seat, 5.29%	1 seat, 5.54%	1 seat, 5.41%
Seats won	1	1	0
Seat change	Steady	Steady	▼1
Popular vote	734	729	579
Percentage	5.71%	5.67%	4.51%
Swing	▲0.42%	▲0.13%	▼0.90%

The 2023 Assembly of Deputies of the Nenets Autonomous Okrug election took place on 8–10 September 2023, on common election day, coinciding with 2023 Arkhangelsk Oblast Assembly of Deputies election. All 19 seats in the Assembly of Deputies were up for reelection.

== Electoral system ==
Under current election laws, the Assembly of Deputies is elected for a term of five years, with parallel voting. 11 seats are elected by party-list proportional representation with a 5% electoral threshold, with the other half elected in 8 single-member constituencies by first-past-the-post voting. Seats in the proportional part are allocated using the Imperiali quota, modified to ensure that every party list, which passes the threshold, receives at least one mandate.

== Candidates ==
=== Party lists ===
To register regional lists of candidates, parties need to collect 0.5% of signatures of all registered voters in Nenets Autonomous Okrug.

The following parties were relieved from the necessity to collect signatures:

- United Russia
- Communist Party of the Russian Federation
- A Just Russia — Patriots — For Truth
- Liberal Democratic Party of Russia
- New People
- Rodina
- Communists of Russia

№	Party	Okrug-wide list	Candidates	Territorial groups	Status
1	Communists of Russia	Nikolay Milovsky	13	8	Registered
2	United Russia	Yury Bezdudny	25	8	Registered
3	Liberal Democratic Party	Leonid Slutsky • Andrey Smychenkov	10	8	Registered
4	The Greens	Vladislav Shestakov	11	7	Registered
5	Rodina	Andrey Ruzhnikov • Yevgeny Makarov • Andrey Yavtysy	18	8	Registered
6	Communist Party	Mikhail Rayn • Mikhail Kushnir • Olga Karpova	14	8	Registered
7	A Just Russia – For Truth	Natalya Lysakova	14	8	Registered
	Civic Initiative				Failed the certification
	New People				Failed the certification

Russian Ecological Party "The Greens" will take part in Nenets legislative election for the first time since last election.

=== Single-mandate constituencies ===
8 single-mandate constituencies were formed in Nenets Autonomous Okrug. To register candidates in single-mandate constituencies need to collect 3% of signatures of registered voters in the constituency.

Number of candidates in single-mandate constituencies
Party	Candidates	
Party	Nominated	Registered
United Russia	8	8
Communist Party	8	8
Liberal Democratic Party	8	7
Rodina	6	6
A Just Russia — For Truth	7	7
Communists of Russia	8	7
The Greens	4	3
Independent	1	1
Total	50	47

== Results ==
=== Results by party lists ===
Summary of the 8–10 September 2023 Assembly of Deputies of the Nenets Autonomous Okrug election results
Party	Party list					Constituency		Total	
Party	Votes	%	±pp	Seats	+/–	Seats	+/–	Seats	+/–
United Russia	5,646	43.94	▲4.97%	5	▲1	8	▲1	13	▲2
Communist Party	3,182	24.76	▲0.96%	3	▲1	0	▼1	3	Steady
Liberal Democratic Party	1,276	9.93	▼7.43%	1	▼1	0	Steady	1	▼1
Communists of Russia	734	5.71	▲0.42%	1	Steady	0	Steady	1	Steady
Rodina	729	5.67	▲0.13%	1	Steady	0	Steady	1	Steady
A Just Russia — For Truth	579	4.51	▼0.90%	0	▼1	0	Steady	0	▼1
The Greens	379	2.95	New	0	New	0	New	0	New
Independents	–	–	–	–	–	0	Steady	0	Steady
Invalid ballots	325	2.53	▼1.09%	—	—	—	—	—	—
Total	12,850	100.00	—	11	Steady	8	Steady	19	Steady
Turnout	12,850	37.65	▲1.75%	—	—	—	—	—	—
Registered voters	34,131	100.00	—	—	—	—	—	—	—

Aleksandr Chursanov (United Russia) was elected Chairman of the Assembly, replacing incumbent Aleksandr Lutovinov (United Russia), who was appointed to the seat of the retiring Senator Rimma Galushina (United Russia).

=== Results in single-member constituencies ===
==== District 1 ====
Summary of the 8–10 September 2023 Assembly of Deputies of the Nenets Autonomous Okrug election in Western constituency No.1
Candidate	Party	Votes	%
Aleksandr Chursanov (incumbent)	United Russia	976	56.74%
Kirill Anufriyev	Communist Party	231	13.43%
Yury Chuklin	Liberal Democratic Party	212	12.33%
Vladimir Vyucheysky	Communists of Russia	199	11.57%
Oleg Breskalenko	A Just Russia — For Truth	49	2.85%
Total		1,720	100%

==== District 2 ====
Summary of the 8–10 September 2023 Assembly of Deputies of the Nenets Autonomous Okrug election in Pechorsky constituency No.2
Candidate	Party	Votes	%
Vladimir Kolybin	United Russia	779	51.83%
Nikolay Bezumov	Communist Party	330	21.96%
Roman Bezumov	Communists of Russia	99	6.59%
Maria Levchakova	Liberal Democratic Party	93	6.19%
Sergey Chupov	Rodina	76	5.06%
Larisa Pryalukhina	A Just Russia — For Truth	65	4.32%
Total		1,503	100%

==== District 3 ====
Summary of the 8–10 September 2023 Assembly of Deputies of the Nenets Autonomous Okrug election in Eastern constituency No.3
Candidate	Party	Votes	%
Matvey Chuprov (incumbent)	United Russia	674	45.08%
Grigory Sergeyev	Independent	520	34.78%
Oksana Ostasheva	Communist Party	87	5.82%
Ksenia Arteyeva	Communists of Russia	62	4.15%
Valentina Goborova	A Just Russia — For Truth	49	3.28%
Maria Klepikova	Liberal Democratic Party	37	2.47%
Andrey Nosov	Rodina	14	0.94%
Total		1,495	100%

==== District 4 ====
Summary of the 8–10 September 2023 Assembly of Deputies of the Nenets Autonomous Okrug election in Iskatelsky constituency No.4
Candidate	Party	Votes	%
Anatoly Kurlenko (incumbent)	United Russia	814	49.42%
Mikhail Rayn	Communist Party	483	29.33%
Grigory Misharin	Rodina	121	7.35%
Yevgeny Vokuyev	The Greens	81	4.92%
Ksenia Polishchuk	Communists of Russia	71	4.31%
Total		1,647	100%

==== District 5 ====
Summary of the 8–10 September 2023 Assembly of Deputies of the Nenets Autonomous Okrug election in Zavodskoy constituency No.5
Candidate	Party	Votes	%
Viktor Gmyrin	United Russia	903	51.42%
Mikhail Kushnir	Communist Party	421	23.97%
Andrey Ruzhnikov	Rodina	158	9.00%
Tatyana Vorobyova	A Just Russia — For Truth	110	6.26%
Dmitry Kovalenko	Liberal Democratic Party	54	3.08%
Yevgeny Ledkov	Communists of Russia	41	2.33%
Yury Ovchinnikov	The Greens	25	1.42%
Total		1,756	100%

==== District 6 ====
Summary of the 8–10 September 2023 Assembly of Deputies of the Nenets Autonomous Okrug election in Portovy constituency No.6
Candidate	Party	Votes	%
Oleg Plesovskikh	United Russia	684	45.69%
Olga Karpova	Communist Party	383	25.58%
Aleksey Kozhevin	Liberal Democratic Party	114	7.62%
Aleksey Kanev	Communists of Russia	82	5.48%
Yelena Zapalova	A Just Russia — For Truth	74	4.94%
Yevgeny Makarov	Rodina	60	4.01%
Galina Semyashkina	The Greens	44	2.94%
Total		1,497	100%

==== District 7 ====
Summary of the 8–10 September 2023 Assembly of Deputies of the Nenets Autonomous Okrug election in Southern constituency No.7
Candidate	Party	Votes	%
Yevgeny Shestakov	United Russia	648	41.35%
Anna Bulatova (incumbent)	Communist Party	613	39.12%
Roman Popov	Rodina	97	6.19%
Yury Markov	A Just Russia — For Truth	89	5.68%
Yevgeny Berkut	Liberal Democratic Party	78	4.98%
Total		1,567	100%

==== District 8 ====
Summary of the 8–10 September 2023 Assembly of Deputies of the Nenets Autonomous Okrug election in Gorodetsky constituency No.8
Candidate	Party	Votes	%
Irina Pudovkina	United Russia	711	45.03%
Irina Matveyeva	Communist Party	593	37.56%
Aleksandr Illarionov	Liberal Democratic Party	80	5.07%
Daniil Ledkov	Communists of Russia	78	4.94%
Svetlana Mikheyeva	A Just Russia — For Truth	77	4.88%
Total		1,579	100%

== See also ==
- 2023 Russian regional elections
