= Nenets constituency =

Russian legislative constituency

Nenets single-member constituency
- Constituency of the Russian State Duma

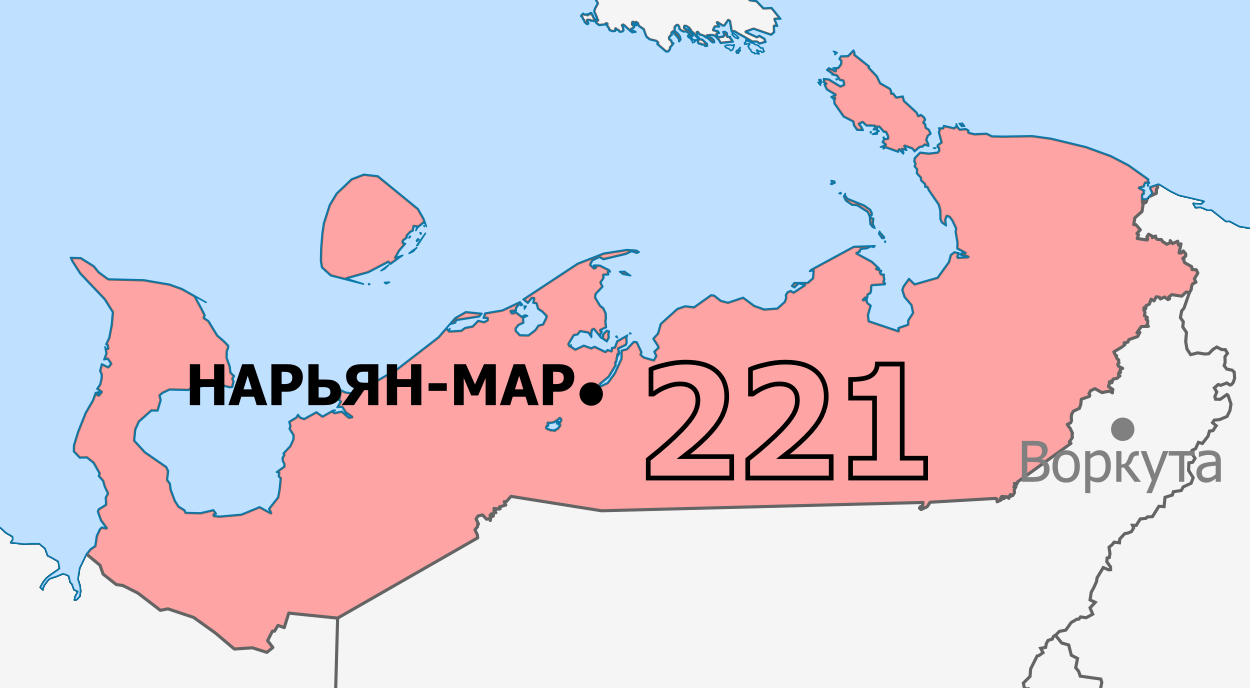
- Deputy: Mikhail Kislyakov; United Russia
- Federal subject: Nenets Autonomous Okrug
- Districts: Naryan-Mar, Zapolyarny
- Voters: 39,753 (2026)

The Nenets constituency (No. 221 (Note: No.218 in 1993-2007)) is a Russian legislative constituency in the Nenets Autonomous Okrug. The constituency encompasses the entire territory of the Nenets Autonomous Okrug.

The constituency has been represented since 2026 by United Russia deputy Mikhail Kislyakov, two-term State Duma member and commercial fisherman, who won the open seat, succeeding two-term United Russia incumbent Sergey Kotkin.

== Boundaries ==
1993–2007, 2016–present: Naryan-Mar, Zapolyarny District
The constituency has been covering the entirety of the Nenets Autonomous Okrug since its initial creation in 1993.

== Members elected ==
Election	Member	Party
1993	Artur Chilingarov	Civic Union
1995	Artur Chilingarov	Ivan Rybkin Bloc
1999	Artur Chilingarov	Fatherland – All Russia
2003	Artur Chilingarov	United Russia
2007	Proportional representation - no election by constituency	
2011	Proportional representation - no election by constituency	
2016	Sergey Kotkin	United Russia
2021	Sergey Kotkin	United Russia
2026	Mikhail Kislyakov	United Russia

== Election results ==
=== 1993 ===
Summary of the 12 December 1993 Russian legislative election in the Nenets constituency
Candidate	Party	Votes	%
Artur Chilingarov	Civic Union	10,184	56.20%
Anatoly Koltunov	Independent	–	12.70%
Kamol Azamov	Independent	–	–
Nikolay Bobrikov	Independent	–	–
Yury Shcherbachyov	Democratic Party	–	–
Prokopy Yavtysy	Independent	–	–
Oleg Yuzhakov	Independent	–	–
Total		18,120	100%

=== 1995 ===
Summary of the 17 December 1995 Russian legislative election in the Nenets constituency
Candidate	Party	Votes	%
Artur Chilingarov (incumbent)	Ivan Rybkin Bloc	12,548	58.63%
Mikhail Shipilov	Agrarian Party	3,246	15.17%
Aleksey Churilov	Liberal Democratic Party	2,009	9.39%
Olga Terletskaya	Independent	555	2.59%
Filipp Ardeyev	Independent	417	1.95%
Nikolay Vlasov	Independent	244	1.14%
against all		1,923	8.99%
Total		21,402	100%

=== 1999 ===
Summary of the 19 December 1999 Russian legislative election in the Nenets constituency
Candidate	Party	Votes	%
Artur Chilingarov (incumbent)	Fatherland – All Russia	9,941	47.13%
Andrey Vavilov	Independent	3,170	15.03%
Yury Romanov	Independent	2,321	11.00%
Elek Rybak	Independent	1,433	6.79%
Igor Koshin	Independent	831	3.94%
Aleksandr Sidorov	Independent	478	2.27%
Vladimir Yanzinov	Yabloko	349	1.65%
Viktor Fomin	Independent	219	1.04%
Boris Borodkin	Independent	198	0.94%
Konstantin Sochnev	Independent	130	0.62%
Aleksey Kapustin	Independent	52	0.25%
Yury Gudzhabidze	Spiritual Heritage	28	0.13%
Rafel Khudaverdiyev	Independent	21	0.10%
Sergey Perov	Independent	14	0.07%
against all		1,515	7.18%
Total		21,093	100%

=== 2003 ===
Summary of the 7 December 2003 Russian legislative election in the Nenets constituency
Candidate	Party	Votes	%
Artur Chilingarov (incumbent)	United Russia	8,319	47.79%
Vyacheslav Korepanov	Independent	4,032	21.22%
Elek Rybak	Independent	2,370	12.47%
Yury Romanov	Communist Party	901	4.74%
Vladislav Peskov	Independent	648	3.41%
Dmitry Ruzhnikov	Independent	586	3.08%
Andrey Ruzhnikov	Independent	437	2.30%
Sergey Sultanov	Independent	60	0.32%
against all		1,437	7.56%
Total		19,008	100%

=== 2016 ===
Summary of the 18 September 2016 Russian legislative election in the Nenets constituency
Candidate	Party	Votes	%
Sergey Kotkin	United Russia	5,862	45.30%
Aleksandr Sablin	Communist Party	3,491	26.98%
Andrey Smychenkov	Liberal Democratic Party	1,436	11.10%
Viktor Shustrov	A Just Russia	1,045	8.08%
Natalia Soluyanova	Rodina	452	3.49%
Aleksey Lebedev	Communists of Russia	212	1.64%
Total		12,940	100%

=== 2021 ===
Summary of the 17-19 September 2021 Russian legislative election in the Nenets constituency
Candidate	Party	Votes	%
Sergey Kotkin (incumbent)	United Russia	5,072	39.57%
Mikhail Rayn	Communist Party	4,580	35.73%
Andrey Smychenkov	Liberal Democratic Party	878	6.85%
Dmitry Nikitin	The Greens	841	6.56%
Oleg Breskalenko	A Just Russia — For Truth	647	5.05%
Nikolay Milovsky	Communists of Russia	367	2.86%
Total		12,819	100%

=== 2026 ===
Summary of the 18-20 September 2026 Russian legislative election in the Nenets constituency
Candidate	Party	Votes	%
Mikhail Kislyakov	United Russia	6,415	42.25%
Mikhail Rayn	Communist Party	4,465	29.41%
Lyudmila Taybarey	Liberal Democratic Party	2,541	16.74%
Tatyana Antipina	A Just Russia	1,476	9.72%
Total		15,182	100%
