= Administrative divisions of Nenets Autonomous Okrug =

Administrative districts of Russian federal subject

Nenets Autonomous Okrug Russia

Administrative structure (as of 2009)
- Districts: 1
- Cities/towns: 1
- Urban-type settlements: 2
- Selsovets: 17

Municipal structure (as of 2002)
- Rural settlements: 43 (inhabited)

Nenets Autonomous Okrug is a federal subject of Russia.

== Administrative and municipal divisions ==
Map

Division	Structure		OKATO	OKTMO	Urban-type settlement	Rural (selsovet)
Division	Administrative	Municipal	OKATO	OKTMO	Urban-type settlement	Rural (selsovet)
Naryan-Mar (Нарьян-Мар)	city	urban okrug	11 111	11 851	Iskateley (Искателей)	
Zapolyarny (Заполярный)	district		11 181	11 811		18
