= Nelmin-Nos =

Village in Zapolyarny District, Nenets Autonomous Okrug

Nelmin-Nos Не́льмин-Нос
- Interactive map of Nelmin-Nos
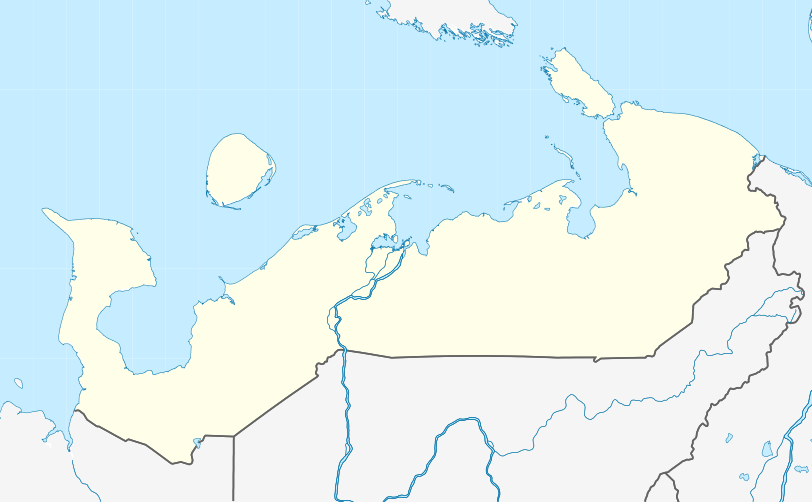
- Location of Nelmin-Nos Nelmin-Nos (Nenets Autonomous Okrug)
- Country: Russia
- Federal subject: Nenets Autonomous Okrug
- Founded: 1933

Area
  - Total: 1.604 km^{2} (0.619 sq mi)

Population (2010 Census)
  - Total: 916
  - Estimate (2021): 721 (−21.3%)
  - Density: 571/km^{2} (1,480/sq mi)
- Time zone: UTC+3 (MSK)
- Postal code: 166714
- Dialing code: +7 81853
- OKTMO ID: 11811454101
- Website: malozemadm.ru

Nelmin-Nos (Russian: Не́льмин-Нос; Nenets: Нельмин Саля, Neļmin Salja) is a village in Zapolyarny District, Nenets Autonomous Okrug, Russia. It had a population of 916 as of 2010, a decrease from its population of 970 in 2002.

== Geography ==
Nelmin-Nos is about 35 km north of Naryan-Mar, located on the Pechora.

== Climate ==
Nelmin-Nos has a subarctic climate (Dfc).
