= Mgla =

Human settlement in Zapolyarny District, Nenets Autonomous Okrug, Russia

Mgla Мгла
- Interactive map of Mgla
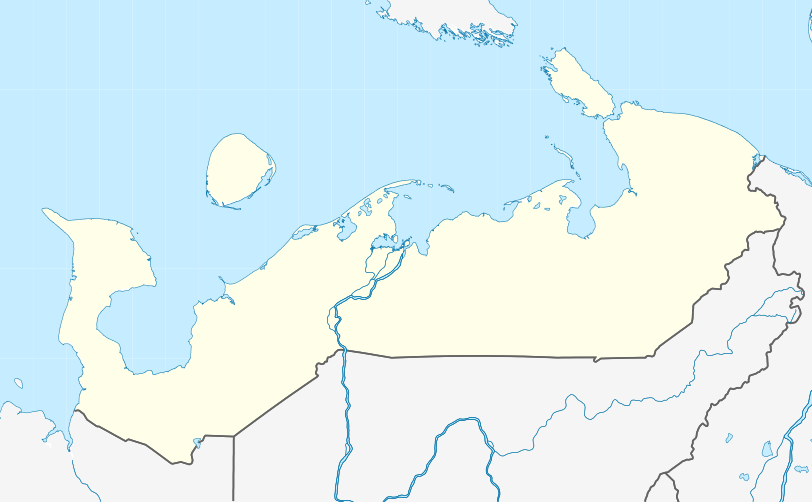
- Location of Mgla Mgla (Nenets Autonomous Okrug)
- Country: Russia
- Federal subject: Nenets Autonomous Okrug

Population (2010 Census)
  - Total: 20
  - Estimate (2021): 12 (−40%)
- Time zone: UTC+3 (MSK)
- Postal code: 166737
- Dialing code: +7 81857
- OKTMO ID: 11811443111

Mgla (Russian: Мгла) is a rural locality (a selo) in Zapolyarny District of Nenets Autonomous Okrug, Russia. Mgla had a population of 20 people as of 2010, a decrease from a population of 33 in 2002.

== Geography ==
Mgla is located in the southern portions of the Kanin Peninsula. The village is on the coast of the White Sea.
