= Karatayka =

Karatayka Карата́йка

Other transcription(s)
  - Nenets: Харая
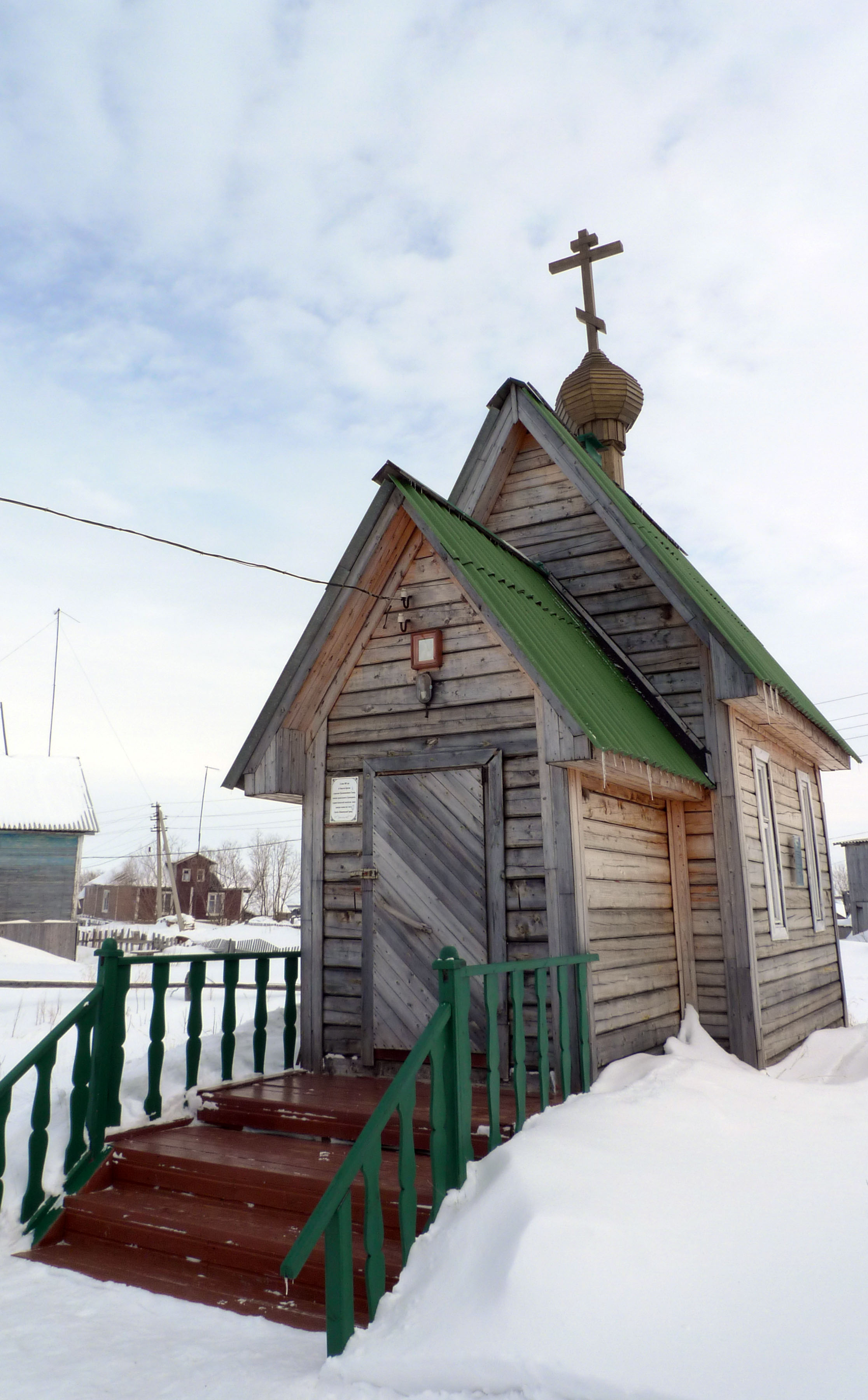
- Interactive map of Karatayka
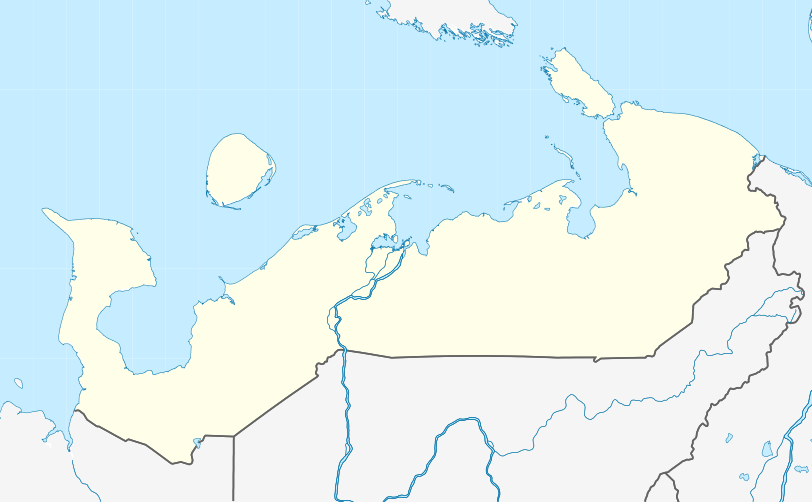
- Location of Karatayka Karatayka (Nenets Autonomous Okrug)
- Country: Russia
- Federal subject: Nenets Autonomous Okrug

Population (2010 Census)
  - Total: 544
  - Estimate (2021): 429 (−21.1%)
- Time zone: UTC+3 (MSK)
- Postal code: 166742
- Dialing code: +7 81857
- OKTMO ID: 11811479101

Karatayka (Russian: Карата́йка; Nenets: Харая, romanized: Haraja) is a village in Zapolyarny District, Nenets Autonomous Okrug, Russia. It had a population of 544 as of the 2010 census, a decrease from its population of 625 in the 2002 census.
