= Viktor Novozhilov (politician) =

Russian politician (born 1965)

- Виктор Новожилов
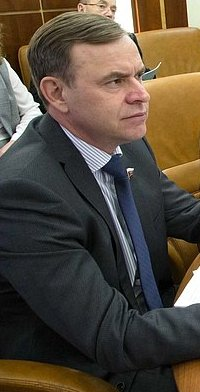

Senator from the Legislative Assembly of Arkhangelsk Oblast
- In office 17 September 2018 – 23 September 2023
- Preceded by: Vitaly Fortygin
- Succeeded by: Ivan Novikov

Personal details
- Born: Viktor Novozhilov; 16 February 1965 (age 61) Syamzhensky District, Vologda Oblast, Russian Soviet Federative Socialist Republic, Soviet Union
- Party: United Russia
- Education: Vologda State Dairy Farming Academy

Viktor Feodosevich Novozhilov (Russian: Виктор Феодосьевич Новожилов; born 16 February 1965) is a Russian politician who served as a senator from Arkhangelsk Oblast from 2018 to 2023.

== Biography ==
Viktor Novozhilov was born on 16 February 1965 in Syamzhensky District, Vologda Oblast. In 1989, he graduated from the Vologda State Dairy Academy. In 2012, he also received a degree from the Russian Presidential Academy of National Economy and Public Administration. At the beginning of the 1990s, Novozhilov moved to Arkhangelsk Oblast where he engaged with private enterneuship. From 1993 to 2013, he was the founder and the general director of the LLC "Dial-Sever". From 2004 to 2012, he was also a deputy of the Deputy Council of the Velsky district of the 3rd and 4th convocations. In 2009, he was appointed public representative of the governor of the Arkhangelsk region in the Velsky district. In 2013, he became deputy of the Arkhangelsk Oblast Assembly of Deputies of the 6th convocation from the United Russia party. On 21 September 2018, he became the senator from the Legislative Assembly of Arkhangelsk Oblast.

Viktor Novozhilov is under personal sanctions introduced by the European Union, the United Kingdom, the USA, Canada, Switzerland, Australia, Ukraine, New Zealand, for ratifying the decisions of the "Treaty of Friendship, Cooperation and Mutual Assistance between the Russian Federation and the Donetsk People's Republic and between the Russian Federation and the Luhansk People's Republic" and providing political and economic support for Russia's annexation of Ukrainian territories.
