= Rimma Galushina =

Russian politician

- Римма Галушина
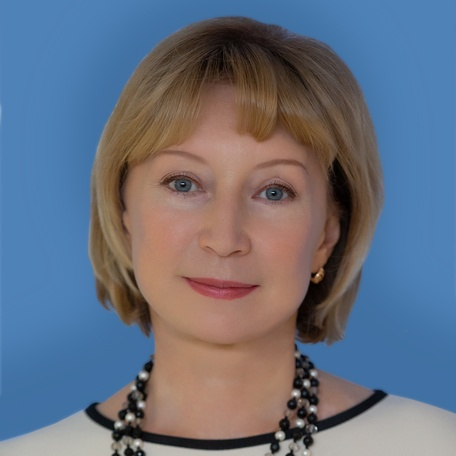

Senator from the Yamalo-Nenets Autonomous Okrug
- In office 2 October 2018 – 7 November 2023
- Preceded by: Evgeny Alexeev
- Succeeded by: Aleksandr Lutovinov

Personal details
- Born: Rimma Galushina; 26 March 1969 (age 57) Naryan-Mar, Nenets Autonomous Okrug, Russian Soviet Federative Socialist Republic, Soviet Union
- Party: United Russia
- Education: Herzen University
- Awards: Medal of the Order "For Merit to the Fatherland"

Rimma Fyodorovna Galushina (Russian: Римма Фёдоровна Галушина; born 30 May 1963) is a Russian politician who served as a senator from the Yamalo-Nenets Autonomous Okrug from 2 October 2018 to November 2023.

== Career ==
Rimma Galushina was born on 30 May 1963 in Naryan-Mar. In 1984, she graduated from the Herzen University in Saint Petersburg. Afterward, she moved back to the Nenets Autonomous Okrug to work as a teacher in a local school. From 2005 to 2009, she served as a director of the Nenets boarding school. She left the position to become the head of the Department of Education and Youth Policy of the Nenets Autonomous Okrug. In 2014 Galushina was appointed the assistant to a member of the Federation Council of the Russian Federation for work in the Nenets Autonomous Okrug. On 2 October 2018, she became the senator from the Yamalo-Nenets Autonomous Okrug.

== Sanctions ==
Rimma Galushina is under personal sanctions introduced by the European Union, the United Kingdom, the USA, Canada, Switzerland, Australia, Ukraine, New Zealand, for ratifying the decisions of the "Treaty of Friendship, Cooperation and Mutual Assistance between the Russian Federation and the Donetsk People's Republic and between the Russian Federation and the Luhansk People's Republic" and providing political and economic support for Russia's annexation of Ukrainian territories.
