= Sergey Kotkin =

Russian politician

Sergey Kotkin MP
- Сергей Коткин
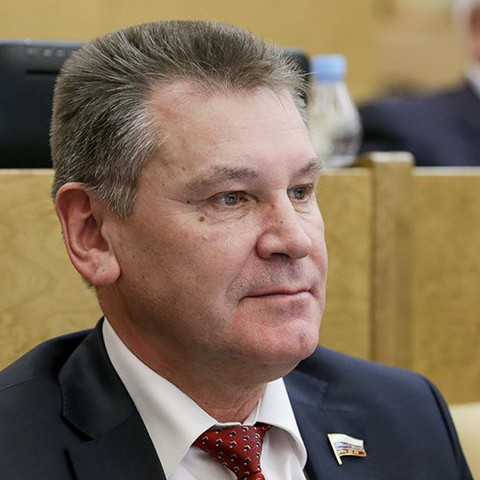
- Kotkin in 2018

Member of the State Duma
- In office 5 October 2016 – 30 September 2026
- Preceded by: Constituency re-established
- Succeeded by: Mikhail Kislyakov
- Constituency: Nenets-Autonomous Okrug-at-large (No. 221)

Senator from the Nenets Autonomous Okrug
- In office 17 March 2014 – 22 September 2014
- Preceded by: Igor Koshin
- Succeeded by: Yevgeny Alekseyev

Personal details
- Born: 11 March 1956 (age 70) Nes', Nenets Autonomous Okrug, RSFSR, USSR
- Party: United Russia
- Education: Riga Civil Aviation Engineers Institute

Sergey Nikolaevich Kotkin (Russian: Сергей Николаевич Коткин; born 11 March 1956, Malotenginskaya, Krasnodar Krai) is a Russian politician who was a deputy of the 7th and 8th State Dumas.

In 1982, Kotkin started his career at the Federal Security Service, first as an ordinary detective and later as the head of a department. From 2000 to 2009, he worked at the customs terminal "Viba". From 2005 to 2014, he was the deputy of the Assembly of Deputies of the Nenets Autonomous Okrug. From November to 2016, he was secretary at the Nenets regional branch of "United Russia". In 2014, he became a member of the Federation Council. In September 2016, he was elected deputy of the 7th State Duma from the Nenets Autonomous Okrug constituency. In 2021, he was re-elected as the deputy of the 8th State Duma.

== Sanctions ==
He was sanctioned by the UK government in 2022 in relation to the Russo-Ukrainian War.
