= Iskateley =

Iskateley Искателей
- Work settlement
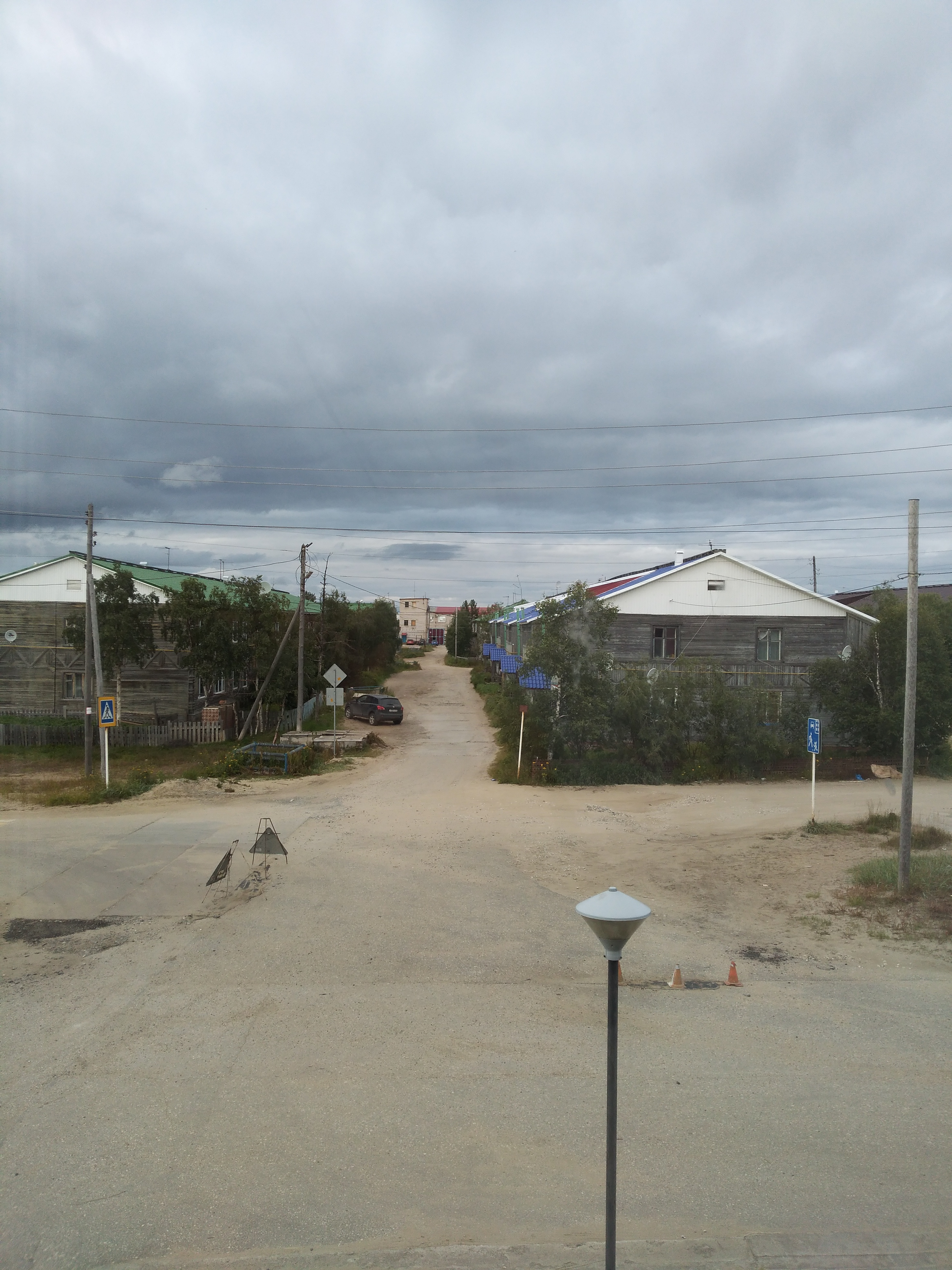

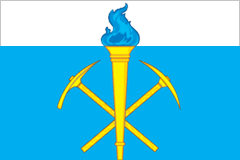
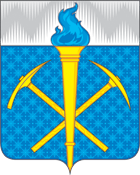
- Flag Coat of arms
- Interactive map of Iskateley
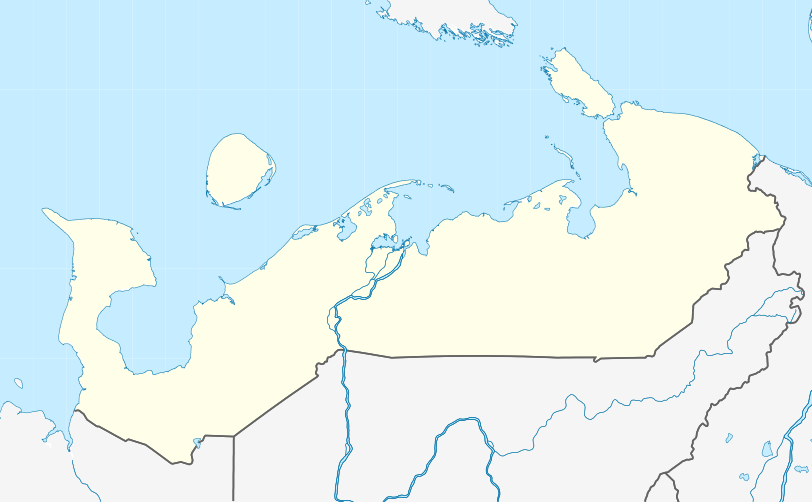
- Location of Iskateley Iskateley (Nenets Autonomous Okrug)
- Coordinates: 67°40′24″N 53°7′43″E
- Country: Russia
- Federal subject: Nenets Autonomous Okrug
- Administrative district: Zapolyarny District
- Founded: 1968
- Work settlement status since: 1986

Population (2010 Census)
  - Total: 6,881
  - Estimate (2025): 7,326 (+6.5%)

Administrative status
  - Capital of: Zapolyarny District

Municipal status
  - Municipal district: Zapolyarny Municipal District
  - Urban settlement: Work Settlement Iskateley
  - Capital of: Zapolyarny Municipal District, Work Settlement Iskateley
- Time zone: UTC+3 (MSK)
- Postal codes: 166700, 166701
- OKTMO ID: 11811111051

Iskateley (Russian: Искателей) is an urban locality (a work settlement) and the administrative center of Zapolyarny District of Nenets Autonomous Okrug, Russia. It is located on the right bank of the Pechora River, 6 kilometres (3.7 mi) from the center of the city of Naryan-Mar.

== History ==
The settlement developed around the geology exploration point founded here in 1968. The name "Iskateley", which means "Explorers", was given to the settlement in 1974, and in 1986 it was granted an urban-type settlement (work settlement) status. Until 2005 Iskateley was administratively subordinated to the city of Naryan-Mar. In 2008 it became the administrative center of Zapolyarny District.

== Administrative and municipal status ==
Within the framework of administrative divisions, Iskateley is incorporated as an urban-type settlement within Zapolyarny District. As a municipal division, Work Settlement Iskateley is incorporated within Zapolyarny Municipal District.

== Economy ==
=== Industry ===
Several companies dealing with oil exploration are based in the settlement.

== Demographics ==
Population: 6,881 (2010 census); 6,981 (2002 census); 8,627 (1989 Soviet census).

=== Transportation ===
Iskateley is connected with Naryan-Mar by an urban bus line. The airport, as well as the river port, are located in Naryan-Mar.
