= Aleksandr Lutovinov =

- Александр Лутовинов
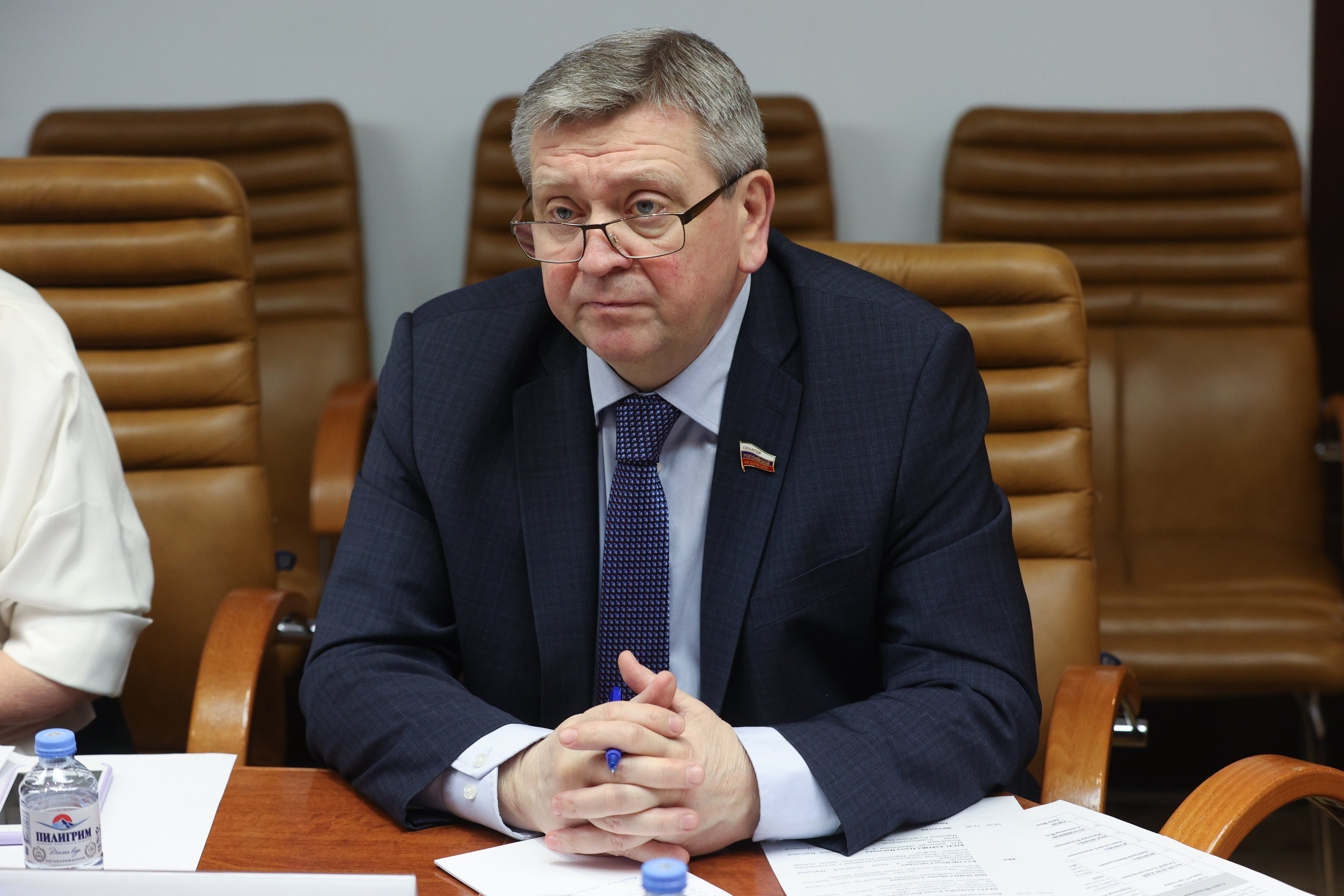

Senator from Nenets Autonomous Okrug
- Incumbent
- Assumed office 7 November 2023
- Preceded by: Rimma Galushina

Chairman of the Assembly of Deputies of the Nenets Autonomous Okrug
- In office 27 September 2018 – 9 October 2023
- Preceded by: Anatoly Myadin
- Succeeded by: Aleksandr Chursanov

Personal details
- Born: 2 March 1957 (age 69) Balezino, RSFSR, Soviet Union
- Party: United Russia
- Education: Sverdlovsk Higher Military-Political Tank-Artillery School; Lenin Military-Political Academy
- Awards: Medal of the Order "For Merit to the Fatherland"

Military service
- Branch/service: Soviet Armed Forces; Russian Armed Forces
- Rank: Colonel

Aleksandr Ilyich Lutovinov (Russian: Александр Ильич Лутовинов; born March 2, 1957, in Balezino, Udmurt ASSR, Soviet Union) is a Russian politician and senator of the Federation Council (since 2023). He served on the Federation Council Committee on Science, Education, and Culture. On September 25, 2024, he transferred to the Federation Council Committee on Rules and Organization of Parliamentary Activities.

He previously served as Chairman of the Assembly of Deputies of the Nenets Autonomous Okrug from September 27, 2018, to October 9, 2023.

== Biography ==
In 1979, he graduated from the Sverdlovsk Higher Military-Political Tank-Artillery School. In 1989, he graduated from the Lenin Military-Political Academy. He holds a PhD in Psychology and a Doctor of Pedagogical Sciences.

From 1975 to 1995, he served in the Soviet Armed Forces and then the Russian Armed Forces. His military rank was Colonel. From 1996 to 2003, he worked in the customs authorities of the Russian Federation. From 2001 to 2003, he was the Head of the Institute for Retraining and Advanced Training of the Russian Customs Academy and Deputy Head of the Russian Customs Academy for Educational Work. From 2003 to 2005, he was Deputy Head of Yuri Rodionovsky of the Naryan-Mar City Administration for Construction, Housing and Utilities, Energy, Communications, and Transport. From 2006 to 2008, he was the General Director of OJSC Myasoprodukty. In 2007, he was elected as a deputy of the Naryan-Mar City Council. From 2008 to 2009, he worked as the first deputy of the head of the Naryan-Mar administration, Yuri Rodinovsky.

In 2009, he was elected as a deputy of the Assembly of Deputies of the Nenets Autonomous Okrug of the 26th convocation, where he worked in the Assembly as the chairman of the standing committee on public safety and anti-corruption, chairman of the standing committee on issues of state structure and local self-government.

From 2008 to 2012 he served as acting Secretary and Secretary of the Nenets regional branch of United Russia party. Since 2012 he served as First Deputy Secretary of the Nenets regional branch of the United Russia party. On September 14, 2014, he was elected as a deputy of the Assembly of Deputies of the Nenets Autonomous Okrug of the 27th convocation, and since October 8, 2014, the leader of the United Russia faction in the Assembly of Deputies of the Nenets Autonomous Okrug.

On November 3, 2023, he was elected as a member of the Federation Council, representing the Assembly of Deputies of the Nenets Autonomous Okrug.
