= Ivan Novikov (politician) =

- Иван Новиков
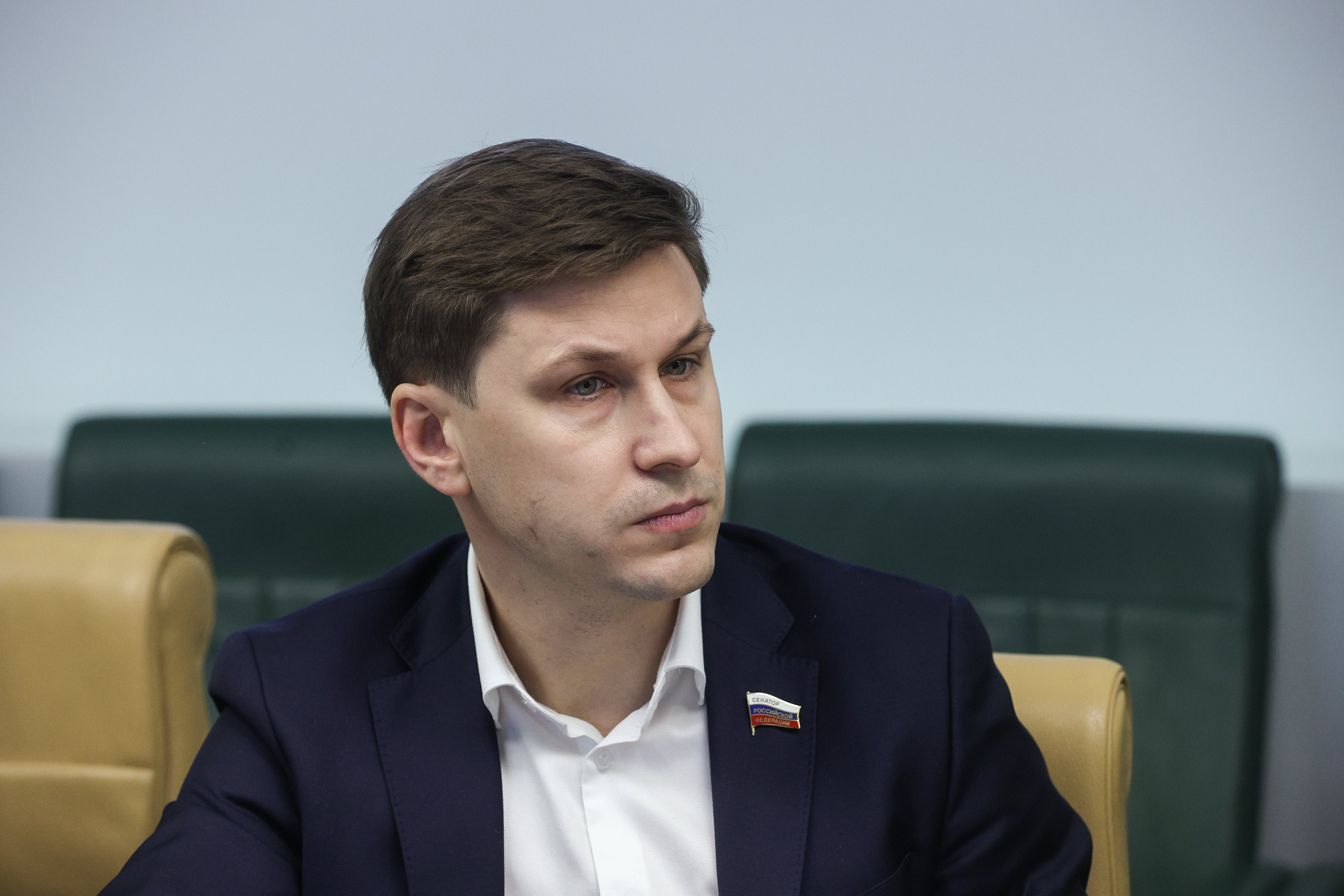

Senator from Arkhangelsk Oblast
- Incumbent
- Assumed office 22 September 2023
- Preceded by: Viktor Novozhilov

Personal details
- Born: 22 January 1985 (age 41) Navodovo, RSFSR, Soviet Union
- Party: United Russia
- Education: Pomorsky State University

Ivan Vladimirovich Novikov (Russian: Иван Владимирович Новиков; born January 22, 1985, in Navodovo, Shenkursky District, Arkhangelsk Oblast, RSFSR, USSR) is a Russian politician, a senator of the Federation Council – representative of the legislative body of Arkhangelsk Oblast (since September 23, 2023), and member of the Federation Council Committee on Social Policy. On November 12, 2025, he was transferred from the aforementioned Committee to the Federation Council Committee on International Affairs (RF Resolution No. 500 of November 12, 2025).

He is a member of the United Russia party and Deputy Secretary of the party's regional branch for conducting election campaigns at all levels in the Arkhangelsk Oblast and working with parliamentary associations.

== Biography ==
Born on January 22, 1985, in the village of Navodovo, Shenkursky District, Arkhangelsk Oblast. After graduating from Shenkurskaya Secondary School in 2002, he began working in the district administration, in the Department of Women, Family, Youth, and Local Government, where he worked as a youth worker until 2003. In 2003, he also worked as a supplementary education teacher at his native Shenkurskaya Secondary School.

He subsequently moved to Arkhangelsk and enrolled at Pomorsky State University. In 2009, he served as deputy chairman of the student and graduate student trade union at Pomorsky State University. He graduated from the university the same year with a degree in social work, qualifying as a social work specialist.

After graduating, he began working in the party. From 2009 to 2011, he was the chief specialist in the party development department of the regional executive committee of the Arkhangelsk regional branch of the United Russia party. From 2011 to 2012, he was deputy head, and from 2012 to 2015, deputy head and head of the party development department of the regional executive committee of United Russia in the Arkhangelsk Oblast.

In 2015, he transferred to the Arkhangelsk regional government, and until 2017, he served as press secretary to Governor of Arkhangelsk Oblast, Igor Orlov. From 2017 to 2018, he served as director of the press service and information department of the Arkhangelsk regional government.

On September 9, 2018, he was elected as a deputy of the Arkhangelsk Oblast Assembly of Deputies of the 7th convocation in single-mandate constituency No. 23 (Shenkursky and Nyandomsky districts), receiving 42.16% of the vote. He chaired the regional assembly committee for the development of civil society institutions. He served as deputy leader and later as leader of the United Russia faction. He represented the regional assembly on the standing committee for interparliamentary cooperation of the Parliamentary Association of Northwest Russia.

On September 10, 2023, he was re-elected as a deputy of the Arkhangelsk Oblast Assembly of Deputies of the 8th convocation from United Russia in single-mandate constituency No. 23 (48.74%). After his election, he resigned his mandate due to his transfer to the Federation Council.

On September 22, 2023, the Arkhangelsk Oblast Assembly of Deputies granted Ivan Novikov the powers of a senator—a representative of the regional legislative body. He replaced Viktor Novozhilov in the upper house of parliament.
