= Grigory Shilkin =

Russian politician (born 1976)

Grigory Shilkin MP
- Григорий Шилкин
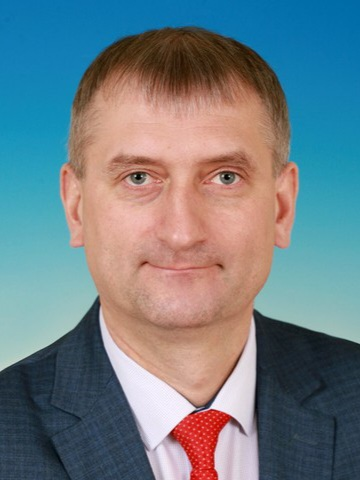
- Shilkin in 2021

Member of the State Duma (Party List Seat)
- Incumbent
- Assumed office 12 October 2021

Personal details
- Born: 20 October 1976 (age 48); Arkhangelsk, RSFSR, USSR
- Political party: New People
- Education: All-Russian Correspondence Financial and Economic Institute

Grigory Vladimirovich Shilkin (Russian: Григорий Владимирович Шилкин; born 20 October 1976, Arkhangelsk) is a Russian political figure and a deputy of the 8th State Duma.

In 1997, Shilkin started working at the Krasnoyarsk Machine-Building Plant. From 2004 to 2021, he was the General Director of the Arkhangelsk Specialized Energy Enterprise. Since September 2021, he has served as deputy of the 8th State Duma.

== Sanctions ==
He was sanctioned by the UK government in 2022 in relation to the Russo-Ukrainian War.
