= Northern State Medical University =

Public medical school in Arkhangelisk, Russian

- Северный государственный медицинский университет
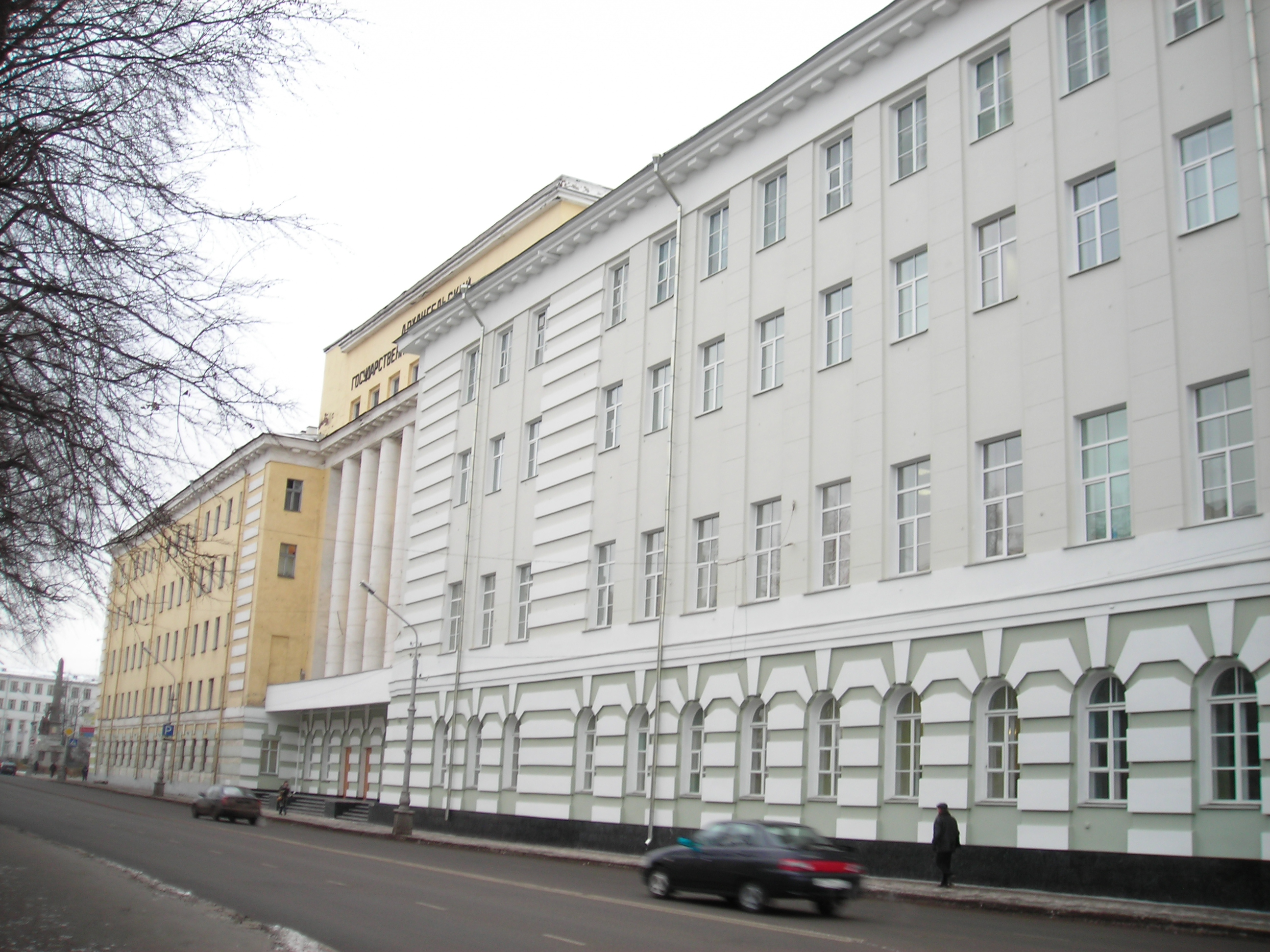
- Type: Public
- Established: 2 October 1931
- Location: Arkhangelsk, Russia; 64°32′32″N 40°30′52″E
- Campus: Urban
- Nickname: SMGU (Russian: СГМУ)
- Website: www.nsmu.ru

Northern State Medical University (Russian: Федеральное государственное бюджетное образовательное учреждение высшего образования «Северный государственный медицинский университет» Министерства здравоохранения Российской Федерации) is a higher education institution in Arkhangelsk, Arkhangelsk Oblast in the European part of Russia.

== History ==
By Resolution No. 1055 of the Council of People's Commissars of the RSFSR, "On Improving Medical and Sanitary Services for Workers in the Timber Export Industry of the Northern Territory" dated October 2, 1931, the People's Commissariat of Health ordered the establishment of a medical institute in Arkhangelsk. A two-story stone building, formerly the Arkhangelsk City Duma, was urgently transferred for the establishment of the institute. Preparatory courses began on July 6, 1932, and on August 4, 1932, the institute was officially opened.

In 1935, the Department of Physical Education and Medical Rehabilitation was established at the Arkhangelsk State Medical Institute, headed by Professor G. I. Krasnoselsky.

In 1994, the Arkhangelsk State Medical Institute was transformed into the Arkhangelsk State Medical Academy; in 2000, it was reorganized into the Northern State Medical University.

In 2022, it was announced that a campus for Northern (Arctic) Federal University and SSMU universities would be built in Arkhangelsk, dubbed "Arctic Star". The campus will cover 128,000 square meters and include dormitories, a hotel, retail space, a fitness center, laboratories, a technology park, and conference halls. The campus is planned to be fully built by 2027.

From April 1, 2025, Nadezhda Aleksandrovna Bylova, Associate Professor, was appointed Acting Rector.
