= Arkhangelsk Oblast Assembly of Deputies =

Regional parliament of Arkhangelsk Oblast, Russia

Arkhangelsk Oblast Assembly of Deputies Архангельское областное собрание депутатов
- 7th legislature

Type
- Type: Unicameral

Leadership
- Chairwoman: Ekaterina Prokopeva, United Russia since 20 September 2018

Structure
- Seats: 47
- Political groups: United Russia (36) LDPR (4); CPRF (3); A Just Russia (3) New People (1)

Elections
- Last election: 8-10 September 2023
- Next election: 2028

Meeting place
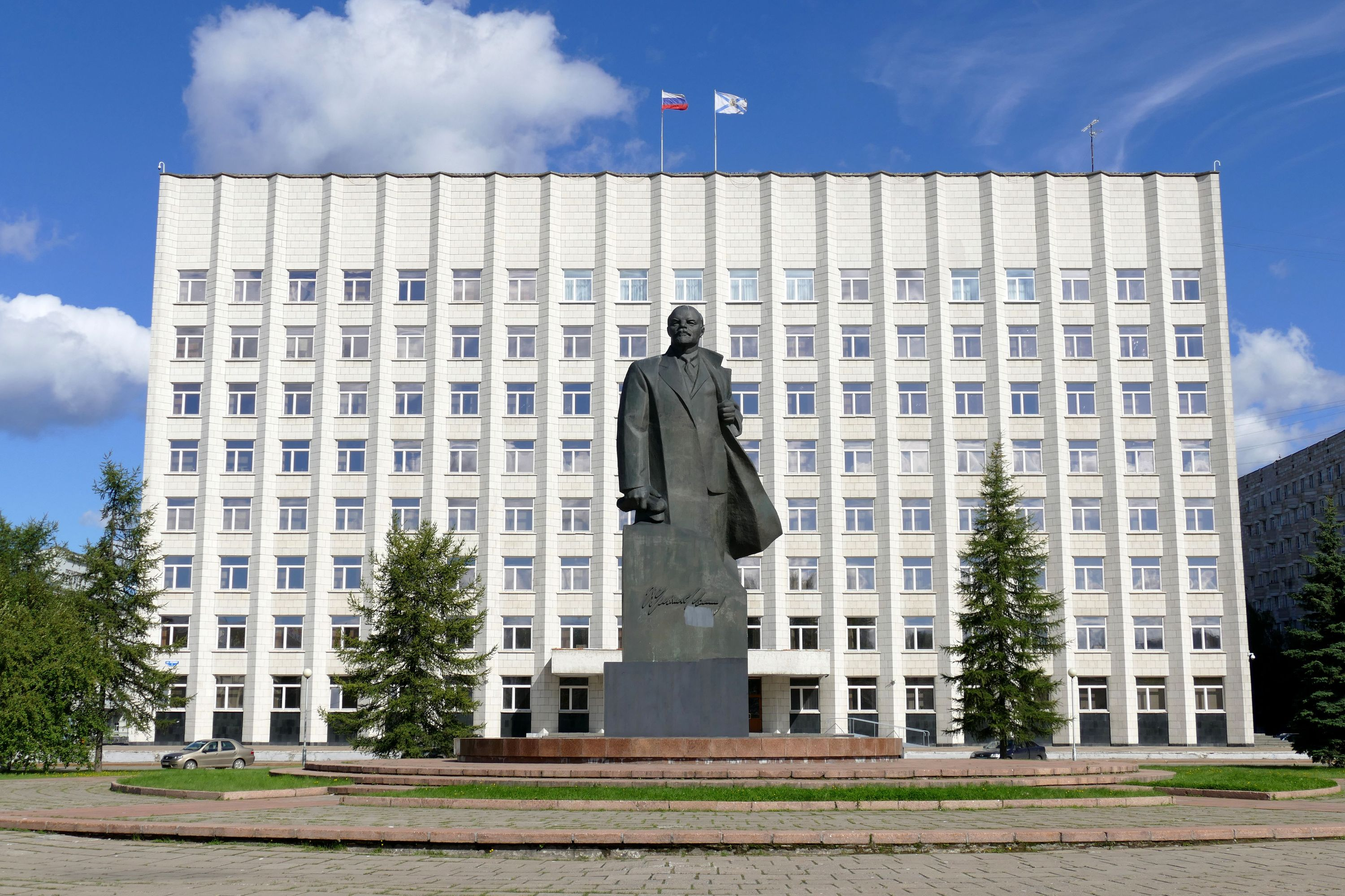
- 1 Lenin Square, Arkhangelsk

Website
- aosd.ru

The Arkhangelsk Oblast Assembly of Deputies (Russian: Архангельское областное собрание депутатов) is the regional parliament of Arkhangelsk Oblast, a federal subject of Russia. A total of 47 deputies are elected for five-year terms.

== Elections ==
=== 2013 ===
Party	%	Seats
United Russia	40.69	32
Communist Party of the Russian Federation	12.88	6
Liberal Democratic Party of Russia	12.30	4
A Just Russia	10.46	3
Rodina	6.18	2

=== 2018 ===
Party	%	Seats
United Russia	31.59	25
Liberal Democratic Party of Russia	23.45	9
Communist Party of the Russian Federation	18.82	7
A Just Russia	15.06	5
Self-nominated	—	1

=== 2023 ===
Party	%	Seats
United Russia	50.18	36
Liberal Democratic Party of Russia	14.88	4
Communist Party of the Russian Federation	10.92	3
A Just Russia	8.99	3
New People	5.21	1
