= Zapolyarny District =

Zapolyarny District Заполярный район (Russian)
- District
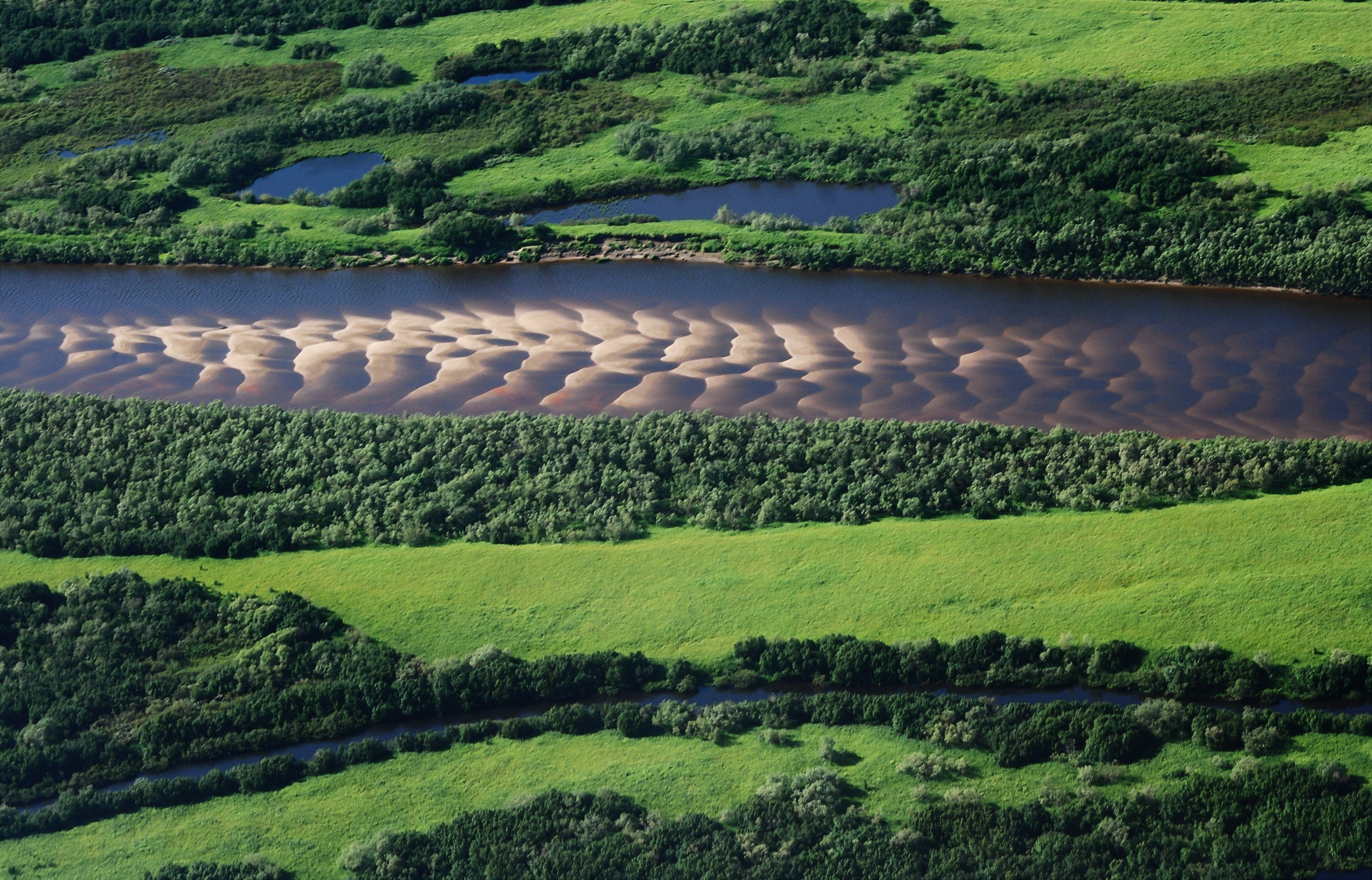
- Pechora River, Zapolyarny District

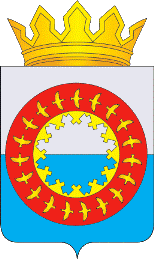
- Flag Coat of arms
- Zapolyarny District covers Nenets Autonomous Okrug, except for city of Naryan-Mar which is in the center, on the Pechora River.
- Coordinates: 67°40′N 53°08′E
- Country: Russia
- Federal subject: Nenets Autonomous Okrug
- Administrative center: Iskateley

Area
  - Total: 170,000 km^{2} (66,000 sq mi)

Population (2010 Census)
  - Total: 20,432
  - Density: 0.12/km^{2} (0.31/sq mi)
  - Urban: 33.7%
  - Rural: 66.3%

Administrative structure
  - Administrative divisions: 1 Urban-type settlements of district significance, 17 Selsoviets
  - Inhabited localities: 1 urban-type settlements, 41 rural localities

Municipal structure
  - Municipally incorporated as: Zapolyarny Municipal District
  - Municipal divisions: 1 urban settlements, 18 rural settlements
- Time zone: UTC+3 (MSK)
- OKTMO ID: 11811000
- Website: http://zrnao.ru

Zapolyarny District (Russian: Заполя́рный райо́н) is an administrative and municipal district (raion), the only one in Nenets Autonomous Okrug, Russia. It encompasses all of the territory of the autonomous okrug, with the exception of the territory of the town of okrug significance of Naryan-Mar, the only other top-level administrative division of the autonomous okrug. The area of the district is approximately 170,000 square kilometers (66,000 sq mi). Its administrative center is the urban locality (a work settlement) of Iskateley. Population: 20,432 (2010 Census). The population of Iskateley accounts for 33.7% of the district's total population.

== Etymology ==
The name of the district is an adjective which literally means "beyond the Arctic Circle", due to the fact that most of the district's territory indeed lies to the north of the Arctic Circle.

== History ==
Prior to 2010, the territory of the autonomous okrug had only one top-level administrative division—the town of okrug significance of Naryan-Mar—with the rest of the territory divided into selsoviets which were not a part of any top-level division. In 2006, within the framework of municipal divisions, the town of okrug significance of Naryan-Mar was incorporated as Naryan-Mar Urban Okrug, and the rest of the autonomous okrug's territory was incorporated as Zapolyarny Municipal District. However, it was not until April 19, 2010 when an administrative district matching the territory of the municipal district was established, and it was not until April 28, 2014 when "Zapolyarny" officially became the district's name.

== Geography ==
The district stretches for about 320 kilometers (200 mi) from north to south and for 950 kilometers (590 mi) from east to west: from Cape Bolvansky Nos in the north to the source of the Oma River in the south, and from Cape Kanin Nos in the west to the banks of the Kara River in the east.

== Economy ==
The outer boundary of Zapolyarny District is identical to that of Nenets Autonomous Okrug; therefore there is no economic sector of significance to the district that is not also of equal significance to the autonomous okrug. The main economic drivers are oil and gas, although reindeer husbandry is still seen as a core part of the culture of the indigenous Nenets people.
