= Naryan-Mar =

Naryan-Mar Нарьян-Мар
- Town

Other transcription(s)
  - Nenets: Няръяна мар
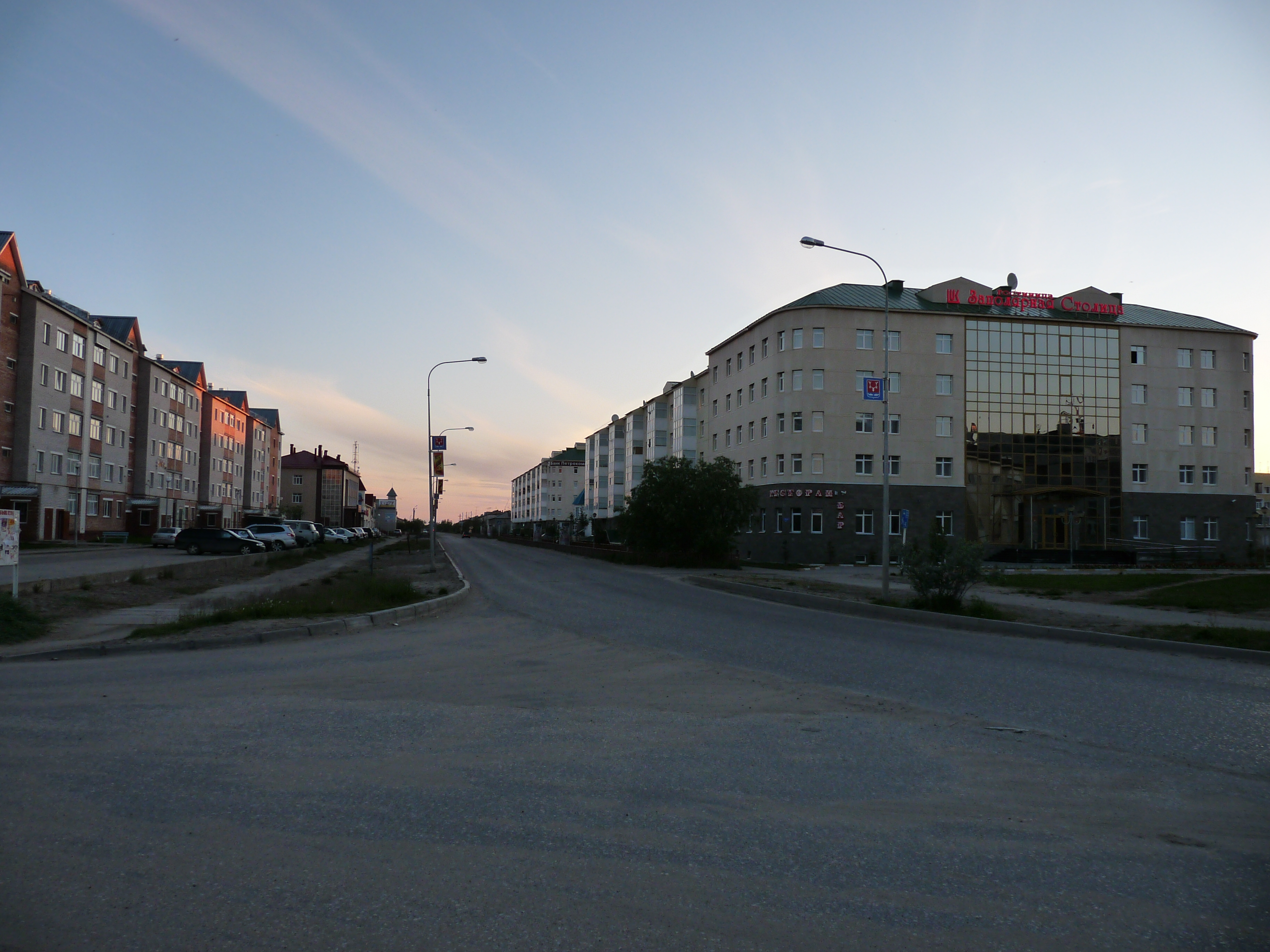

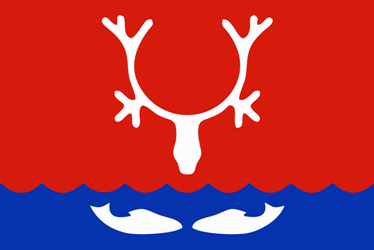
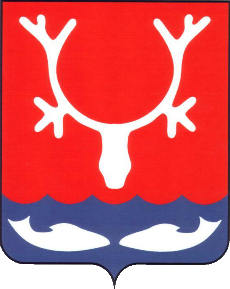
- Flag Coat of arms
- Interactive map of Naryan-Mar
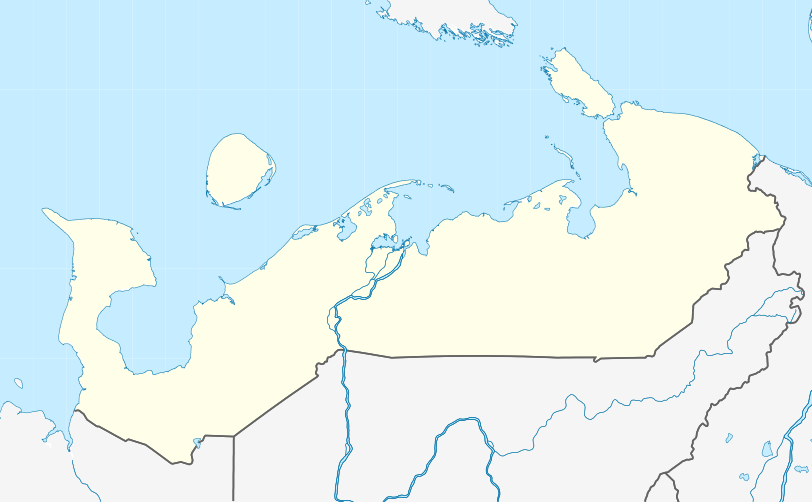
- Location of Naryan-Mar Naryan-Mar (European Russia) Naryan-Mar (Russia) Naryan-Mar (Europe)
- Coordinates: 67°38′N 53°03′E
- Country: Russia
- Federal subject: Nenets Autonomous Okrug
- Founded: 1930

Government
  - Mayor: Oleg Belak
- Elevation: 64 m (210 ft)

Population (2010 Census)
  - Total: 21,658
  - Estimate (2025): 24,056 (+11.1%)

Administrative status
  - Subordinated to: city of okrug significance of Naryan-Mar
  - Capital of: Nenets Autonomous Okrug, city of okrug significance of Naryan-Mar

Municipal status
  - Urban okrug: Naryan-Mar Urban Okrug
  - Capital of: Naryan-Mar Urban Okrug
- Time zone: UTC+3 (MSK)
- Postal code: 166000
- Dialing code: +7 81853
- OKTMO ID: 11851000001
- Website: www.adm-nmar.ru

Naryan-Mar (Russian: Нарья́н-Мар; Nenets: Няръяна мар, romanized: Njarjana mar, lit. 'red town') is a sea and river port town and the administrative center of the Nenets Autonomous Okrug, Russia. The town is situated on the right bank of the Pechora River, 110 kilometers (68 mi) upstream from the river's mouth, on the Barents Sea. Naryan-Mar lies north of the Arctic Circle. Population: 21,658 (2010 census); 18,611 (2002 census); 20,182 (1989 Soviet census); 17,000 (1973). About half of the population of Nenetsia lives in the city.

== History ==
Industrial development in the area around Naryan-Mar began in 1930, in the course of the first five-year plan of the Soviet Union. The growth of the region was the direct result of the development of the Pechora coalfield and the construction of related industrial infrastructure.

Naryan-Mar was for many years a center of the lumber industry, and possesses several large, and currently defunct, lumber mills. At present, the biggest employer in the town is the petroleum company LUKoil.

The town's importance derives from being the only developed commercial port in an area of several thousand square miles. As a result, Naryan-Mar has a reasonably well developed tourist and hospitality services, with several saunas and hotels. The town also hosts a local museum, a large World War II memorial, an Orthodox church, and a historic district which predates the foundation of the modern city. Sports fishing is also possible in the area.

== Administrative and municipal status ==
Naryan-Mar is the administrative center of the autonomous okrug. Within the framework of administrative divisions, it is incorporated as the town of okrug significance of Naryan-Mar—an administrative unit with the status equal to that of the districts. As a municipal division, the town of okrug significance of Naryan-Mar is incorporated as Naryan-Mar Urban Okrug.

== Transportation ==
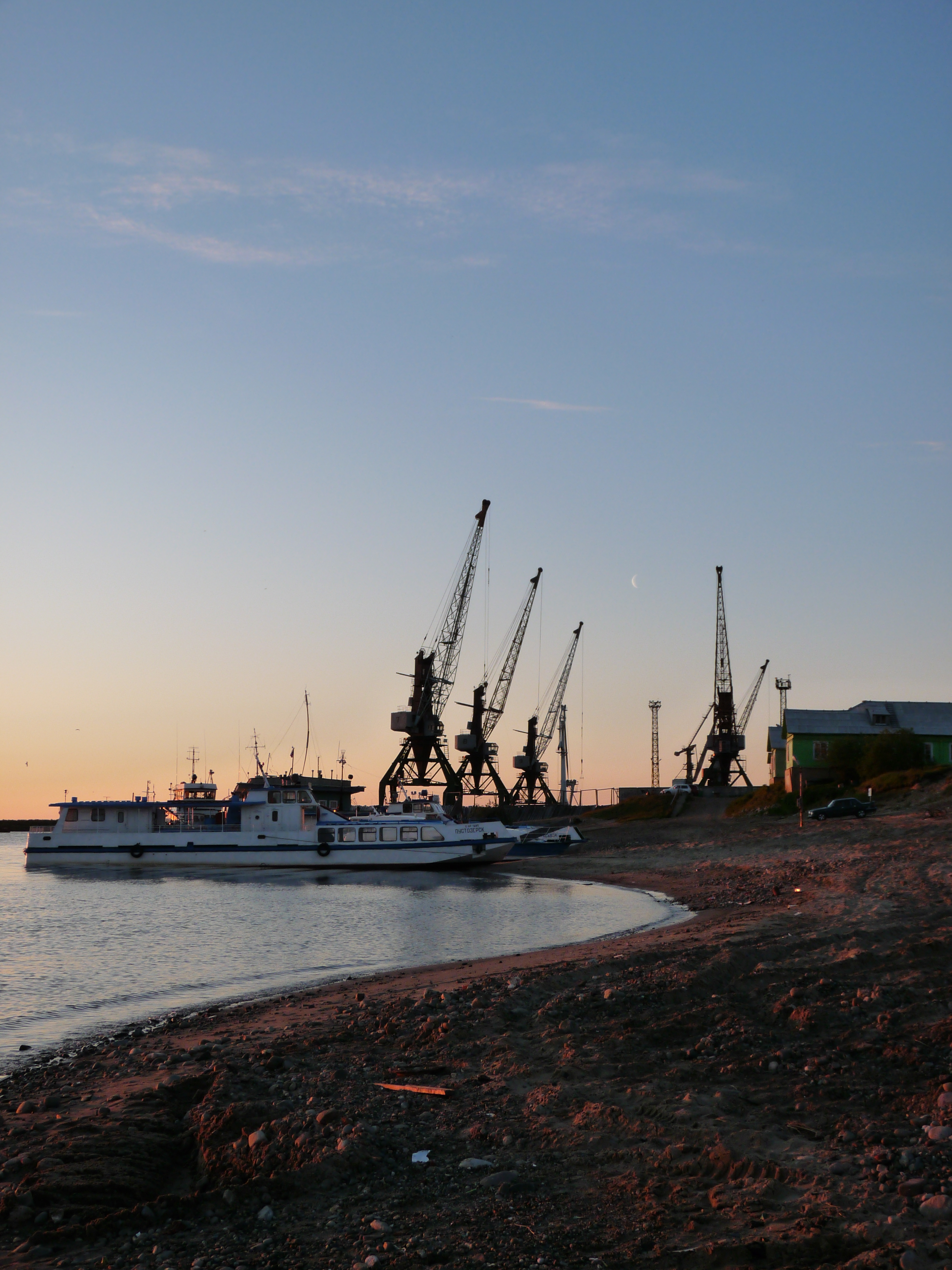
The port of Naryan-Mar

The town is served by the Naryan-Mar Airport, which is connected to the town by the 3 kilometres (1.9 mi)-long A-381. It's possible to drive from Moscow to Naryan-Mar on the 87Р-001 highway.

== Climate ==
Naryan-Mar has a subarctic climate (Köppen climate classification Dfc) with short, mild summers that may exceed +25 °C (77 °F) and very cold winters. Precipitation is somewhat greater in summer than in winter.

The "midnight sun" is above the horizon from 28 May to 15 July (49 days), and the period with continuous darkness is somewhat shorter—the polar night lasts from 14 December to 29 December (16 days).

Climate data for Naryan-Mar
Month	Jan	Feb	Mar	Apr	May	Jun	Jul	Aug	Sep	Oct	Nov	Dec	Year
Record high °C (°F)	−0.6 (30.9)	−0.6 (30.9)	7.4 (45.3)	14.0 (57.2)	23.0 (73.4)	32.0 (89.6)	32.0 (89.6)	30.2 (86.4)	24.9 (76.8)	16.1 (61.0)	2.8 (37.0)	−0.4 (31.3)	32.0 (89.6)
Mean daily maximum °C (°F)	−12.9 (8.8)	−12.1 (10.2)	−6.5 (20.3)	−0.8 (30.6)	5.8 (42.4)	14.2 (57.6)	18.9 (66.0)	15.0 (59.0)	9.8 (49.6)	1.8 (35.2)	−5.7 (21.7)	−9.0 (15.8)	1.5 (34.8)
Daily mean °C (°F)	−16.8 (1.8)	−16.0 (3.2)	−10.7 (12.7)	−5.0 (23.0)	1.6 (34.9)	9.2 (48.6)	13.8 (56.8)	10.8 (51.4)	6.5 (43.7)	−0.5 (31.1)	−8.7 (16.3)	−12.5 (9.5)	−2.4 (27.8)
Mean daily minimum °C (°F)	−21.1 (−6.0)	−20.4 (−4.7)	−15.1 (4.8)	−9.1 (15.6)	−1.9 (28.6)	5.3 (41.5)	9.4 (48.9)	7.6 (45.7)	3.6 (38.5)	−2.9 (26.8)	−12.1 (10.2)	−16.4 (2.5)	−6.1 (21.0)
Record low °C (°F)	−53.1 (−63.6)	−52.0 (−61.6)	−48.0 (−54.4)	−38.7 (−37.7)	−26.8 (−16.2)	−9.8 (14.4)	0.4 (32.7)	−1.7 (28.9)	−13.0 (8.6)	−36.0 (−32.8)	−48.9 (−56.0)	−51.0 (−59.8)	−53.1 (−63.6)
Average precipitation mm (inches)	31 (1.2)	23 (0.9)	27 (1.1)	31 (1.2)	38 (1.5)	52 (2.0)	52 (2.0)	71 (2.8)	63 (2.5)	53 (2.1)	41 (1.6)	36 (1.4)	518 (20.3)
Average rainy days	3	2	3	7	14	20	20	25	24	16	6	4	144
Average snowy days	24	22	23	17	11	2	0	0	1	12	20	24	156
Average relative humidity (%)	82	82	81	78	76	72	75	83	86	88	87	84	81
Mean monthly sunshine hours	6.0	47.0	128.0	200.0	187.0	248.0	264.0	160.0	98.0	52.0	13.0	1.0	1,404
Source 1: Pogoda.ru.net
Source 2: NOAA (sun only, 1961-1990)
