= 2023 Primorsky Krai gubernatorial election =

- 8–10 September 2023
- Turnout: 45.55%
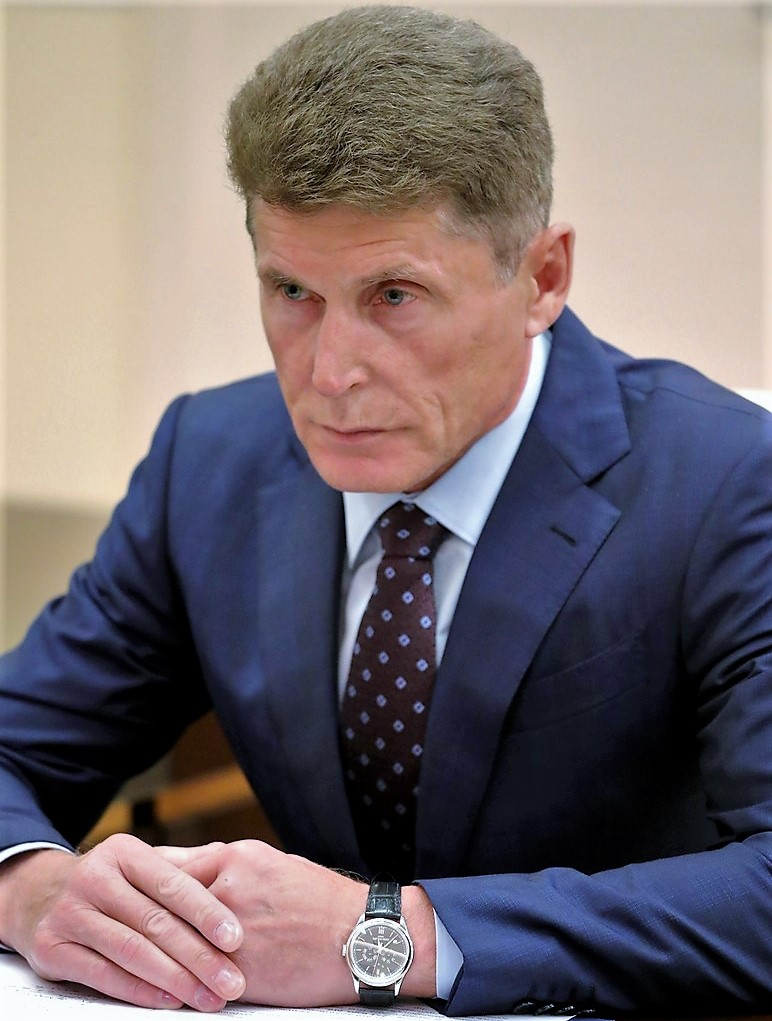
| | | LDPR | CPCR |
| Candidate | Oleg Kozhemyako | Inna Kosheleva | Aleksandr Andoni |
| Party | United Russia | LDPR | CPCR |
| Popular vote | 476,584 | 64,392 | 38,892 |
| Percentage | 72.78% | 9.83% | 5.94% |
- Results by raions and cities
Governor before election
Oleg Kozhemyako
Independent
Elected Governor
Oleg Kozhemyako
United Russia

The 2023 Primorsky Krai gubernatorial election took place on 8–10 September 2023, along with other local elections. Incumbent governor Oleg Kozhemyako was re-elected to a second term in office.

== Background ==
Due to massive irregularities in the second round of the September 2018 Primorsky Krai gubernatorial election between acting Governor of Primorsky Krai Andrey Tarasenko (United Russia) and businessman Andrey Ishchenko (CPRF) the results were annulled. Another gubernatorial election was scheduled for December 2018. On 26 September 2018 Tarasenko declined to seek a full term and resigned, President Vladimir Putin appointed then-Governor of Sakhalin Oblast Oleg Kozhemyako as acting Governor of Primorsky Krai. For Kozhemyako, a Primorsky Krai native, who built a large fishing business and served as Federation Council Senator from the region, it is a fourth governorship as he previously led Sakhalin Oblast (2015–2018), Amur Oblast (2008–2015) and Koryak Autonomous Okrug (2005–2007) – an unbeaten record among Russian politicians. Kozhemyako ran for a full term as an independent and won with 61.9% of the vote, while September election runner-up Andrey Ishchenko lost the support from Communist Party and failed to collect enough signatures to qualify.

Oleg Kozhemyako maintained a high profile as governor persuading to move Far Eastern Federal District administrative centre from Khabarovsk to Vladivostok, transforming regional government structure, visiting Donbass and holding meetings with prominent officeholders, such as President of Belarus Aleksandr Lukashenko.

== Candidates ==
In Primorsky Krai candidates for governor can be nominated only by registered political parties, self-nomination was allowed in September 2018 to allow acting Governor Kozhemyako to run as an independent, however, it was abolished in March 2023. Candidates are not obliged to be members of the nominating party. Candidate for Governor of Primorsky Krai should be a Russian citizen and at least 30 years old. Candidates for governor should not have a foreign citizenship or residence permit. Each candidate in order to be registered is required to collect at least 7% of signatures of members and heads of municipalities. Also gubernatorial candidates present 3 candidacies to the Federation Council and election winner later appoints one of the presented candidates.

=== Registered ===
- Aleksandr Andoni (Communists of Russia), political scientist, journalist
- Inna Kosheleva (LDPR), Member of Duma of Vladivostok (2020–present)
- Denis Kovalyov (Cossack Party), Ussuriysk Federation of Hand-to-Hand Combat president
- Oleg Kozhemyako (United Russia), incumbent Governor of Primorsky Krai (2018–present)
- Kirill Rudyuk (SR–ZP), businessman

=== Withdrawn ===
- Vasily Somov (RPPSS), Member of Duma of Nakhodka (2007–2017, 2022–present), businessman

=== Eliminated at United Russia convention ===
- Andrey Brik, Chairman of the Duma of Vladivostok (2017–present)

=== Declined ===
- Andrey Andreychenko (LDPR), Member of Legislative Assembly of Primorsky Krai (2016–2017, 2021–present), former Member of State Duma (2017–2021), 2014, September 2018 and December 2018 gubernatorial candidate
- Vyacheslav Baydelyuk (RPPSS), Member of Legislative Assembly of Primorsky Krai (2021–present)
- Roza Chemeris (New People), Member of State Duma (2021–present), December 2018 For Women of Russia gubernatorial candidate
- Anatoly Dolgachev (CPRF), Deputy Chairman of the Legislative Assembly of Primorsky Krai (2021–present), Member of Legislative Assembly (2011–present)
- Aleksey Kozitsky (SR–ZP), Member of Legislative Assembly of Primorsky Krai (2011–present), September 2018 gubernatorial candidate

=== Candidates for Federation Council ===
- Oleg Kozhemyako (United Russia):
  - Aleksandr Rolik, Chairman of the Legislative Assembly of Primorsky Krai (2016–present)
  - Vera Shcherbina, Chairwoman of the Government of Primorsky Krai (2018–present)
  - Aleksandr Zakharov, Member of Legislative Assembly of Primorsky Krai (2021–present)

== Polls ==
| Fieldwork date | Polling firm | Kozhemyako | Kosheleva | Andoni | Kovalyov | Rudyuk | None | Lead |
|---|---|---|---|---|---|---|---|---|
| 18–24 August 2023 | WCIOM | 76% | 10% | 7% | 3% | 2% | 3% | 66% |

== Results ==
Summary of the 8–10 September 2023 Primorsky Krai gubernatorial election results
| Candidate | Party | Votes | % |
|---|---|---|---|
| Oleg Kozhemyako (incumbent) | United Russia | 476,584 | 72.78 |
| Inna Kosheleva | Liberal Democratic Party | 64,392 | 9.83 |
| Aleksandr Andoni | Communists of Russia | 38,892 | 5.94 |
| Kirill Rudyuk | A Just Russia — For Truth | 31,245 | 4.77 |
| Denis Kovalyov | Cossack Party | 25,503 | 3.89 |
| Valid votes | | 636,616 | 97.22 |
| Blank ballots | | 18,194 | 2.78 |
| Total | | 654,810 | 100.00 |
| Turnout | | 654,810 | 45.55 |
| Registered voters | | 1,437,494 | 100.00 |

Legislative Assembly of Primorsky Krai chairman Aleksandr Rolik (United Russia) was appointed to the Federation Council, replacing incumbent Svetlana Goryacheva (A Just Russia – For Truth).

== See also ==
- 2023 Russian regional elections
