= 2018 Russian gubernatorial elections =

← 2017	9 September – 16 December 2018	2019 →

26 Heads of Federal Subjects from 85
	First party	Second party
Party	United Russia	CPRF
Last election	6	0
Seats before	77	2
Seats won	21	2
Seats after	74	3
Seat change	-3	+1
	Third party	Fourth party
Party	LDPR	SR
Last election	0	0
Seats before	1	1
Seats won	2	1
Seats after	3	1
Seat change	+2	0

2018 Gubernatorial elections in Russia were held in 26 federal subjects of Russia.

22 federal subjects had direct elections and 4 federal subjects had indirect elections of governors.

The main election day was held on 9 September. In addition, the second round was held in four regions: in two regions it was held on 26 September, in one region on 11 November. In Primorsky Krai, the second round was held on 16 September, but its results were declared invalid, in connection with which new elections will be held on 16 December. In addition, the election of the Governor of the Nenets Autonomous Okrug was held on 1 October.

== List ==
=== Direct elections ===
Result of the election was declared invalid.

Elections	Date	Incumbent governor	Incumbent party	Elected governor	Elected party	Retained	Ref.
2018 Altai Krai gubernatorial election	9 September	Viktor Tomenko (acting)	United Russia	Viktor Tomenko	United Russia	Yes	
2018 Amur Oblast gubernatorial election	9 September	Vasily Orlov (acting)	United Russia	Vasily Orlov	United Russia	Yes	
2018 Vladimir Oblast gubernatorial election	9 and 23 September	Svetlana Orlova	United Russia	Vladimir Sipyagin	Liberal Democratic Party	No	
2018 Voronezh Oblast gubernatorial election	9 September	Alexander Gusev (acting)	United Russia	Alexander Gusev	United Russia	Yes	
2018 Ivanovo Oblast gubernatorial election	9 September	Stanislav Voskresensky (acting)	United Russia	Stanislav Voskresensky	United Russia	Yes	
2018 Kemerovo Oblast gubernatorial election	9 September	Sergey Tsivilyov (acting)	United Russia	Sergey Tsivilyov	United Russia	Yes	
2018 Krasnoyarsk Krai gubernatorial election	9 September	Aleksandr Uss (acting)	United Russia	Aleksandr Uss	United Russia	Yes	
2018 Magadan Oblast gubernatorial election	9 September	Sergey Nosov (acting)	United Russia	Sergey Nosov	United Russia	Yes	
2018 Moscow mayoral election	9 September	Sergey Sobyanin	United Russia (run as independent)	Sergey Sobyanin	United Russia	Yes	
2018 Moscow Oblast gubernatorial election	9 September	Andrey Vorobyov	United Russia	Andrey Vorobyov	United Russia	Yes	
2018 Nizhny Nivgorod Oblast gubernatorial election	9 September	Gleb Nikitin (acting)	United Russia	Gleb Nikitin	United Russia	Yes	
2018 Novosibirsk Oblast gubernatorial election	9 September	Andrey Travnikov (acting)	United Russia	Andrey Travnikov	United Russia	Yes	
2018 Omsk Oblast gubernatorial election	9 September	Alexander Burkov (acting)	A Just Russia (run as independent)	Alexander Burkov	A Just Russia	Yes	
2018 Oryol Oblast gubernatorial election	9 September	Andrey Klychkov (acting)	Communist Party	Andrey Klychkov	Communist Party	Yes	
September 2018 Primorsky Krai gubernatorial election	9 and 16 September	Andrey Tarasenko (acting)	United Russia	Andrey Tarasenko	United Russia	No	
December 2018 Primorsky Krai gubernatorial election	16 December	Oleg Kozhemyako (acting)	United Russia (run as independent)	Oleg Kozhemyako	United Russia	Yes	
2018 Pskov Oblast gubernatorial election	9 September	Mikhail Vedernikov (acting)	United Russia	Mikhail Vedernikov	United Russia	Yes	
2018 Khakassia head election	9 September and 11 November	Viktor Zimin	United Russia	Valentin Konovalov	Communist Party	No	
2018 Samara Oblast gubernatorial election	9 September	Dmitry Azarov (acting)	United Russia	Dmitry Azarov	United Russia	Yes	
2018 Tyumen Oblast gubernatorial election	9 September	Aleksandr Moor (acting)	United Russia	Aleksandr Moor	United Russia	Yes	
2018 Khabarovsk Krai gubernatorial election	9 and 23 September	Vyacheslav Shport	United Russia	Sergey Furgal	Liberal Democratic Party	No	
2018 Chukotka gubernatorial election	9 September	Roman Kopin	United Russia	Roman Kopin	United Russia	Yes	
2018 Yakutia head election	9 September	Aysen Nikolayev (acting)	United Russia	Aysen Nikolayev	United Russia	Yes	

=== Indirect elections ===
Elections	Date	Incumbent governor	Incumbent party	Elected governor	Elected party	Retained	Ref.
2018 Nenets Autonomous Okrug gubernatorial election	1 October	Alexander Tsybulsky (acting)	United Russia	Alexander Tsybulsky	United Russia	Yes	
2018 Dagestan head election	9 September	Vladimir Vasilyev (acting)	United Russia	Vladimir Vasilyev	United Russia	Yes	
2018 Yamalo-Nenets Autonomous Okrug gubernatorial election	9 September	Dmitry Artyukhov (acting)	United Russia	Dmitry Artyukhov	United Russia	Yes	
2018 Ingushetia head election	9 September	Yunus-bek Yevkurov	United Russia	Yunus-bek Yevkurov	United Russia	Yes	
