= Tamara Morshchakova =

Russian jurist, judge

- Тамара Морщакова
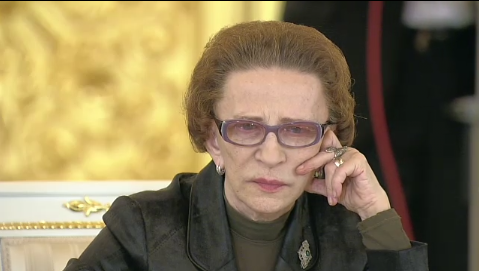
- Morshchakova in December 2018

Deputy President of the Constitutional Court of Russia
- In office 1995–2002
- Preceded by: Nikolay Vitruk
- Succeeded by: Vladimir Strekozov

Judge of the Constitutional Court
- In office 29 October 1991 – 29 March 2002

Personal details
- Born: Tamara Georgievna Morshchakova; 28 March 1936 (age 90) Moscow, Soviet Union
- Education: Moscow State University (Faculty of Law)
- Occupation: Lecturing, writing, researching about the law and rights
- Known for: Developing 1993 Russian Constitution, researching in the Law and Rights, a judge in the Constitutional Court of Russia, forensic expert

Tamara Georgievna Morshchakova (Russian: Тамара Георгиевна Морщакова; born 28 March 1936) is a Soviet and Russian legal scholar and jurist who served as a judge of the Russian Constitutional Court from 1991 till 2002. Tamara Morshchakova was a member of the Presidential Council for Civil Society and Human Rights until 2019.

== Biography ==
Tamara Morshchakova was born on 28 March 1936, in Moscow.

She was appointed a judge of the Constitutional Court by the Congress of People's Deputies in 1991. Tamara Morshchakova participated in developing of many laws, including 1993 Russian State Constitution, participated in developing of a project of the Law on the Constitutional Court of Russia.

Tamara Morshchakova was elected in 2013 for the Commissioner from Europe and Commonwealth of Independent States (CIS), an international institution inside the International Commission of Jurists, and then re-elected in 2018.

=== Presidential Council for Civil Society and Human Rights ===
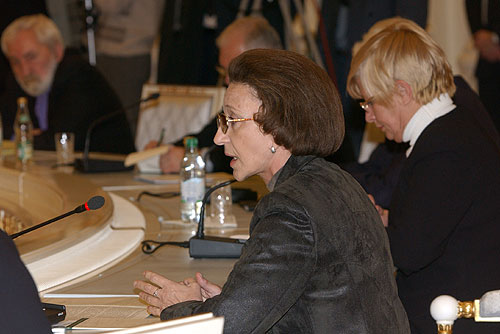
Morshchakova during a meeting with President Putin in the Kremlin, 2003

Tamara Morshchakova was a long time member of the Presidential Council for Civil Society and Human Rights, approx. since 2000s, when the council's chair was Ella Pamfilova. She resigned from the council on 21 October 2019, when President Vladimir Putin had dismissed five core members of the council (Higher School of Economics' professor Mikhail Fedotov, political scientist Ekaterina Schulmann, lawyer Pavel Chikov, Higher School of Economics' professor Ilya Shablinsky, and lawyer Yevgeny Bobrov), saying that the former Council, that was intended for human rights, had disappeared, and she doesn't want to work in the new Council, if the council is intended for other else tasks.

== Publications ==
Tamara Morshchakova is author of about a hundred of publications on the Law and Rights, including these (listed in Russian original language)

- "Эффективность правосудия и проблемы устранения судебных ошибок", в соавторстве [Efficiency of Justice and problems redressing forensic errors, co-author] (1975);
- "Теоретические основы эффективности правосудия", в соавторстве [Theoretical bases of judicial efficiency, co-author] (1980),
- "Оценка качества судебного разбирательства по уголовным делам" [Ranking of the quality of forensic inquiry in the criminal cases] (1988),
- "Судебная реформа" [Justice reform] (1990);
- Учебник уголовного процесса, соавтор [Learning book on criminology process, co-author] (1990, 1995, 1998, 1999)
