= 2018 Primorsky Krai gubernatorial election =

Primorsky Krai gubernatorial election, 2018 may refer to:

- September 2018 Primorsky Krai gubernatorial election, election, the results of which were canceled
- December 2018 Primorsky Krai gubernatorial election, recall election
