= December 2018 Primorsky Krai gubernatorial election =

- 16 December 2018
- Registered: 1,467,211
- Turnout: 46.35%
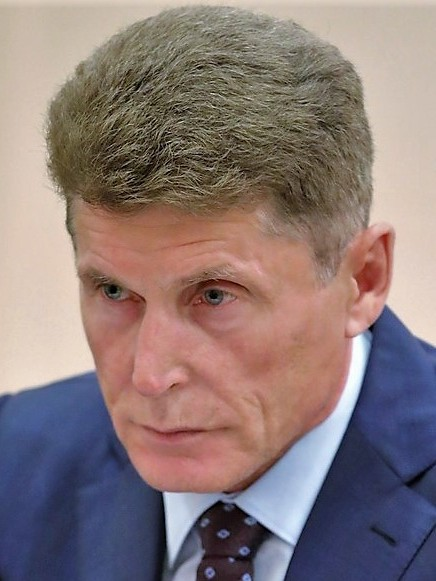

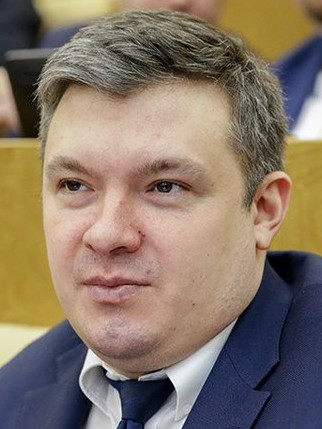
			PG
Candidate	Oleg Kozhemyako	Andrey Andreychenko	Alexey Timchenko
Party	Independent	LDPR	Party of Growth
Popular vote	420,730	171,061	35,126
Percentage	61.88%	25.16%	5.17%
- Municipal results
Acting Governor before election
Oleg Kozhemyako
United Russia
Elected Governor
Oleg Kozhemyako
United Russia

The Primorsky Krai gubernatorial recall election were held on 16 December 2018. Election was scheduled after the cancellation of the results of the elections held in September.

== Previous events ==
On 4 October 2017, Governor Vladimir Miklushevsky resigned, and Russian President Vladimir Putin appointed Andrey Tarasenko as Acting Governor.

Snap gubernatorial election were held on a Single Voting Day on 9 September 2018. In the first round of elections, none of the candidates was able to gain an absolute majority. To the second round, which was scheduled for 16 September, came the incumbent Acting Governor Andrey Tarasenko, nominated by the United Russia, and Andrey Ishchenko, nominated by the Communist Party.

The second round of election caused a wide public response due to the conflict situation that arose when counting the votes cast for the candidates in the second round. In the process of receiving the results from the polling stations all the time with a margin of about 5% was in the lead Ishchenko (up to 95% of the processing protocols), but after processing more than 99% of the protocols was that more votes Tarasenko. After that, the headquarters of both candidates accused each other of violations, and mass protests began.

On 19 September, the Central Election Commission recommended invalidating the election results. According to the law, new election must be held no later than 16 December.

On 26 September, President Vladimir Putin appointed Oleg Kozhemyako as Acting Governor instead of Andrey Tarasenko, who has filed a statement of resignation.

On 16 October, at an extraordinary meeting of the regional Legislative Assembly, the deputies appointed the date of the new election for 16 December 2018.

On 3 November, the Communist party stated it wouldn't nominate a candidate since Andrey Ishchenko "actually won" the September election after which official results were "forged" in favor of Andrey Tarasenko, and also due to problems with passing of the "municipal filter" (a collection of signatures of municipal deputies required to participate in the elections). Nevertheless, Andrey Ishchenko submitted documents for participation in elections to the Regional Election Commission as the independent candidate.

== Candidates ==
=== Registered candidates ===
Initially, 5 candidates were registered to participate in the elections, but on 10 December one candidate withdrew, thus 4 candidates participate in the election.

Candidate	Party	Office
Andrey Andreychenko	Liberal Democratic Party	Member of the State Duma
Oleg Kozhemyako	Independent	Incumbent Acting Governor
Roza Chemeris	For Women of Russia	Member of the Vladivostok City Duma
Alexey Timchenko	Party of Growth	Entrepreneur

=== Withdrawn candidates ===
Candidate	Party	Office	Date of withdrawal
Igor Stepanenko	Patriots of Russia	Former Vice Governor	10 December 2018

=== Rejected candidates ===
Candidates running for Governor, but rejected by REC.

Candidate	Party	Office
Viktor Vasiliev	Independent	Teacher
Andrey Ishchenko	Independent	Member of the Legislative Assembly of Primorsky Krai
Alexander Kovalenko	Independent	Entrepreneur
Oleg Mitvol	The Greens	Public figure
Pavel Mikhalchenkov	Independent	Leader of the political party "Against All"
Viktor Staritsyn	Communist Party of Social Justice	None

=== Other candidates who did not run ===
The individuals in this section have been the subject of speculation about their possible candidacy or expressed an interest in running for governor, but did not submit an application to the Regional Election Commission.

- Alexey Kozitsky, Member of the Legislative Assembly of Primorsky Krai, September 2018 gubernatorial candidate.
- Svetlana Goryacheva, Senator from Primorsky Krai.
- Yulia Tolmacheva, Member of the Legislative Assembly of Primorsky Krai, September 2018 gubernatorial candidate.
- Steven Seagal, actor and film producer. Segal said that he would like to become Governor of Primorsky Krai at the end of September, however, he could not become Governor, because, in addition to Russian citizenship, he also has American and Serbian citizenship (according to the Russian law, multiple citizenship prevents participation in elections). However, according to a poll conducted at the end of October, Steven Seagal would have been able to get up to 10% of the vote.

== Opinion polls ==
Date	Poll source	Andrey Ishchenko	Oleg Kozhemyako	Steven Seagal	Yulia Tolmachyova	Andrey Andreychenko	Alexey Kozitsky	Oleg Mitvol	Roza Chemeris	Igor Stepanenko	Alexey Timchenko	Undecided	Abstention
30 November 2018	WCIOM	—	46%	—	—	10%	—	—	6%	5%	2%	22%	7%
18-20 October 2018	CIPKR	30%	22%	10%	6%	5%	3%	1%	—	—	—	13%	3%
9 September 2018	election result	24.63%	—	—	10.80%	9.27%	4.83%	—	—	—	—	—	—

== Results ==
Summary of the 16 December 2018 Primorsky Krai gubernatorial election results
Candidate	Party	Votes	%
Oleg Kozhemyako	Independent	420,730	61.88
Andrey Andreychenko	Liberal Democratic Party	171,061	25.16
Alexey Timchenko	Party of Growth	35,126	5.17
Roza Chemeris	For Women of Russia	25,854	3.80
Valid votes		652,771	96.01
Blank ballots		27,095	3.99
Total		679,866	100.00
Turnout		679,866	46.35
Registered voters		1,467,211	100.00
Result Archived 2018-12-19 at the Wayback Machine
