= Ministry of Trade, Investment and Enterprise (Sakha Republic) =

Ministry of the Sakha Republic, Russia

Ministry of Trade, Investment and Enterprise of the Sakha Republic (Yakutia) Министерство предпринимательства, торговли и туризма Республики Саха (Якутия)
- Emblem of the Sakha Republic (Yakutia)

Agency overview
- Jurisdiction: Government of the Sakha Republic
- Employees: 280
- Agency executive: Irina Vysokikh, Minister
- Website: minpred.sakha.gov.ru

The Ministry of Trade, Investment and Enterprise of the Sakha Republic (Yakutia) (Russian: Министерство предпринимательства, торговли и туризма Республики Саха (Якутия)) is a regional government regulator and policy maker in the Sakha Republic, Russia. It is responsible for regulating and forming policies related to socioeconomic and business development in the Sakha Republic.

== History ==
The Ministry was established by the Government of the Sakha Republic in December 2016 as key economic modernization regulator and policy maker focused on increasing trade activity with Asia-Pacific and investment in all sectors of economy with particular emphasis on digitization, innovation, renewable energy, sustainable resource development and transport infrastructure. In January 2017, the Head of the Sakha Republic at the time, Yegor Borisov, appointed Anton Safronov to lead this newly-established Ministry.
