= Andreychenko =

Andreychenko, Andrejchenko or Andreichenko (Russian: Андрейченко) is a Russian gender-neutral surname. Notable people with the surname include:

- Andrey Andreychenko (born 1984), Russian politician
- Natalya Andreychenko (born 1956), Russian actress
- Marina Andreichenko (born 1988), Kazakhstani cyclist
