= Andrey Andreychenko =

Russian politician

- Андрей Андрейченко
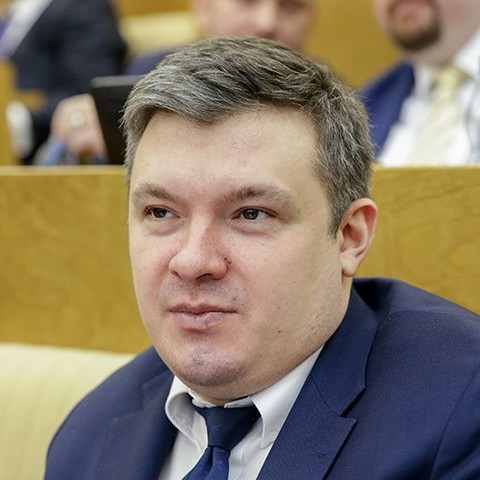
- Andreychenko in 2016

Member of the State Duma
- In office 31 May 2017 – 12 October 2021

Member of the Legislative Assembly of Primorsky Krai
- In office 18 September 2016 – 24 May 2017

Personal details
- Born: Andrey Valeryevich Andreychenko; 29 March 1984 (age 42) Novosibirsk, Soviet Union
- Party: Liberal Democratic Party of Russia

Andrey Valeryevich Andreychenko (Russian: Андрей Валерьевич Андрейченко; born 29 March 1984) is a Russian politician who served as a member of the State Duma of the 7th convocation between 31 May 2017 and 12 October 2021. Previously, he was a member of the Legislative Assembly of Primorsky Krai of the 6th convocation from 18 September 2016 to 24 May 2017.

== Biography ==
Andrey Andreychenko was born in Novosibirsk on 29 March 1984.

=== Education ===
In 2006, Andreychenko graduated from the Faculty of Humanities of Novosibirsk State University with a degree in History Teacher with Knowledge of the Language, qualifying as a historian. As a student in Novosibirsk, he was a member of the Novosibirsk city public organization "Dem Club", led one of the seasons of the Club of Parliamentary Debates - KPD. As a debater he took part in a number of national and international debate tournaments. He is a winner of the Siberian Parliamentary Debate Cup. He is an active participant in a number of television projects organized with the participation of the leaders of the Dem Club.

=== Teaching activities ===
In 2006, Andreychenko moved to Primorye. He was engaged in teaching history at the Far Eastern State University and the Far Eastern State Technical University. In addition, he participated in the organization of educational camps for youth and youth forums.

=== Social and political activity ===
Soon after the move, Andreychenko became the head of the interregional social movement "Our Country", which he headed until 2008. According to some reports, he became a member of the Liberal Democratic Party of Russia in 2006, becoming its deputy coordinator for work with youth, as well as editor of party publications, but in one of his interviews Andreychenko stated 2010 as the year of joining the party. On 4 March 2012, he was elected a deputy of the Duma of the Nakhodka urban district on the general part of the list of candidates.

The stay in the Vladivostok city parliament turned out to be short-lived and already on 14 October 2012, Andreychenko, as the leader of the city-wide list of the Liberal Democratic Party of Russia, was elected as a deputy of the Vladivostok Duma. In it, he was a member of the committee on social policy and veterans affairs, at the same time he was an assistant to the deputy of the State Duma of the Russian Federation from the Liberal Democratic Party of Russia Ruslan Kalyuzhny.

On 8 July 2013, the regional branch of the Liberal Democratic Party nominated Andreychenko as a candidate for the election of the head of Vladivostok. According to the voting results on 8 September 2013, he won 1.80% of the votes of the voting participants, and was ranked sixth place out of nine candidates.

In 2014, the regional branch of the Liberal Democratic Party nominated Andreychenko as a candidate for participation in the elections of the Governor of Primorsky Krai, which took place on 14 September 2014. He received 4.77% of the votes of the voting participants (third place out of four). For some time, he worked as the chief engineer of the Fire Works Workshop LLC.

In 2016, he was nominated as a candidate for the elections of deputies of the State Duma of the VII convocation, both on the list of the LDPR party (headed the regional group No. 41, Primorsky Krai), and in the Vladivostok single-mandate constituency. He did not enter the Russian parliament either on the list or as a single-mandate (in the constituency he received 11.74% of the voter's votes, taking third place out of eight). At the same time, he was elected to the Legislative Assembly of Primorsky Krai, in the elections he was under the 2nd number in the general regional list, and was elected based on the results of the elections.

On 24 May 2017, Andreychenko received the mandate of a member of the State Duma of the VII convocation, which became vacant after the death of a member of the LDPR faction Vasily Tarasyuk. In this regard, the powers of a deputy of the Legislative Assembly of the Primorsky Krai were terminated ahead of schedule. On 31 May, he officially joined the parliament. He joined the LDPR faction and the Duma committee on natural resources, property and land relations.

On 30 June 2018, Andreychenko was nominated by the regional branch of the Liberal Democratic Party to participate in the upcoming elections of the governor of Primorsky Krai. He received votes of 9.27% of those who took part in the voting, thus taking the fourth place (out of five participants), thus not making it to the forthcoming second round. In the second round, he supported the nominee from United Russia the acting governor of Primorsky Krai, Andrey Tarasenko, against the representative of the Communist Party of the Russian Federation, Andrey Ishchenko. After a scandalous second round, the election results were invalidated.

On 23 October 2018, Andreychenko was again nominated by the Primorsky Liberal Democratic Party of Russia as a candidate for the re-election of the governor of the Primorsky Krai. Ishchenko was not admitted to them, as a result of which Andreychenko was able to get 171,061 votes or 25.16% of the vote, taking second place.

Andreychenko is the coordinator of the Primorsky branch of the Liberal Democratic Party.
