= Elmira Glubokovskaya =

Russian politician and public figure

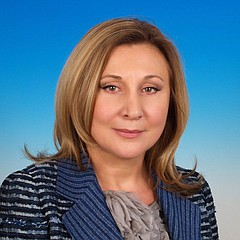
Elmira Glubokovskaya.

Elmira Huseynovna Glubokovskaya (born 20 April 1957) is a Russian political and public figure. Avar by nationality, she was elected to the 5th State Duma in 2007 from the political party Just Russia. She was elected to the 6th State Duma in 2011 from the United Russia party.

== Career ==
Glubokovskaya studied at Dagestan State Medical University. She worked in Vladimir Babichev's office as deputy chief of his secretariat.

== Personal life ==
Her daughter Roza Chemeris was elected to the State Duma in 2021.
