= Expert (magazine) =

Russian business magazine

- March 3, 2008, edition of Expert. Text reads: "What is HE going to do?"
- Editor: Valery Fadeyev
- Categories: Business
- Frequency: Weekly
- Circulation: 90,000
- Founded: 1995
- Company: Expert Group
- Country: Russia
- Based in: Moscow
- Language: Russian
- Website: expert.ru/expert/
- ISSN: 1812-1896

Expert or Ekspert magazine (Russian: Журнал "Эксперт") is a Russian weekly business magazine, established in 1995 in Moscow by a group of editors and journalists who departed from Kommersant publishing house. It covers economics and finance, Russian business, international business, politics, science and technology, culture and arts. It also features a books and market indicators sections. It is part of Expert Group, a media, conference and research business based in Moscow. Besides Expert, it also includes Russkiy Reporter (a current affairs weekly) and Expert TV, a business-oriented TV channel.

== Key facts ==
- Languages: Russian, English (web-only; English website has not been updated since late 2008)
- Pages: 80–160
- Circulation: 90,000 copies (certain issues, containing special reports, up to 150,000 copies)
- Readership: about 350,000
- Ownership: group of editors (majority stake), Oleg Deripaska (minority stake), Globex bank (minority stake)
- Editor: Valery Fadeyev (ru)

== Specialised and regional publications ==
- Expert Severo-Zapad, covering Northwestern region, headquarters in St. Petersburg - since 1999
- Expert Ural, covering Urals region, headquarters in Yekaterinburg - since 2000
- Expert Sibir’, covering Siberia and the Far East, headquarters in Novosibirsk - since 2003
- Expert Kazakhstan, covering independent country of Kazakhstan, headquarters in Almaty - since 2003
- Expert Volga, covering Volga valley region, headquarters in Samara - since 2005
- D` (personal finance magazine) - since 2006
- Expert Yug, covering South of Russia, headquarters in Rostov-on-Don - since 2007
- Russkiy Reporter (Russian Reporter general news weekly) - since 2007
- Expert Tatarstan, covering Russian republic Tatarstan, headquarters in Kazan - since 2014

== Person of the Year ==
Since 2002 Expert has picked a Person of the Year - one or several individuals who significantly influenced economic, business, political or societal development in Russia. The Person of the Year is announced on the cover of the final issue each year. Since the first announcement, all Persons of the Year have been nationals of the Russian Federation. The nomination is similar to Person of the Year by the US Time magazine.

Year	Choice	Age	Notes
2002	Alexander Khloponin	37	First person chosen, Governor of Krasnoyarsk Krai (since 2002), former chairman of the board of Norilsk Nickel. Chosen for transition from business to the government, seen to set example for the new Russian elite
2003	Roman Abramovich and Mikhail Khodorkovsky	37 and 40	Key shareholders of (correspondingly) Sibneft and Yukos oil companies. Both men were hailed for adopting best corporate governance policies to run their companies efficiently and profitably.
2004	Mikhail Fradkov	54	Russian Prime Minister in 2004–2007 for achieving sustained economic growth
2005	Dmitry Medvedev and Alexei Miller	40 and 43	Correspondingly Gazprom's chairman of the board (since 2002) and CEO (since 2001) for turning Gazprom into one of the biggest energy companies in the world
2006	Sergey Lavrov	56	Russian Foreign Minister (since 2004) for delivering foreign policy achievements for Russia
2007	Vladimir Putin	55	Russian President 2000–2008 for his achievements during the period in power
2008	Sergei Ignatyev	60	Chairman of Central Bank of Russia (since 2002) for his actions during the 2008 financial crisis
2009	Yunus-bek Yevkurov	46	President of Ingushetia (since 2008) for his effort to keep peace in North Caucasus region of Russia
2010	New Russian citizen		
2011	Mikhail Prokhorov	46	Russian billionaire, independent candidate for 2012 presidential elections and former leader of Russian pro-business political party Right Cause. Hailed for being the first Russian businessman decided to deal in politics since 2003.

== Business model ==
According to general director Valery Fadeyev, Russian aluminum magnate Oleg Deripaska has offered to set up a media holding named after the magazine "when Expert has grown to the need of developing a business".
