= Valery Fadeyev =

Russian journalist and public figure

- Валерий Фадеев
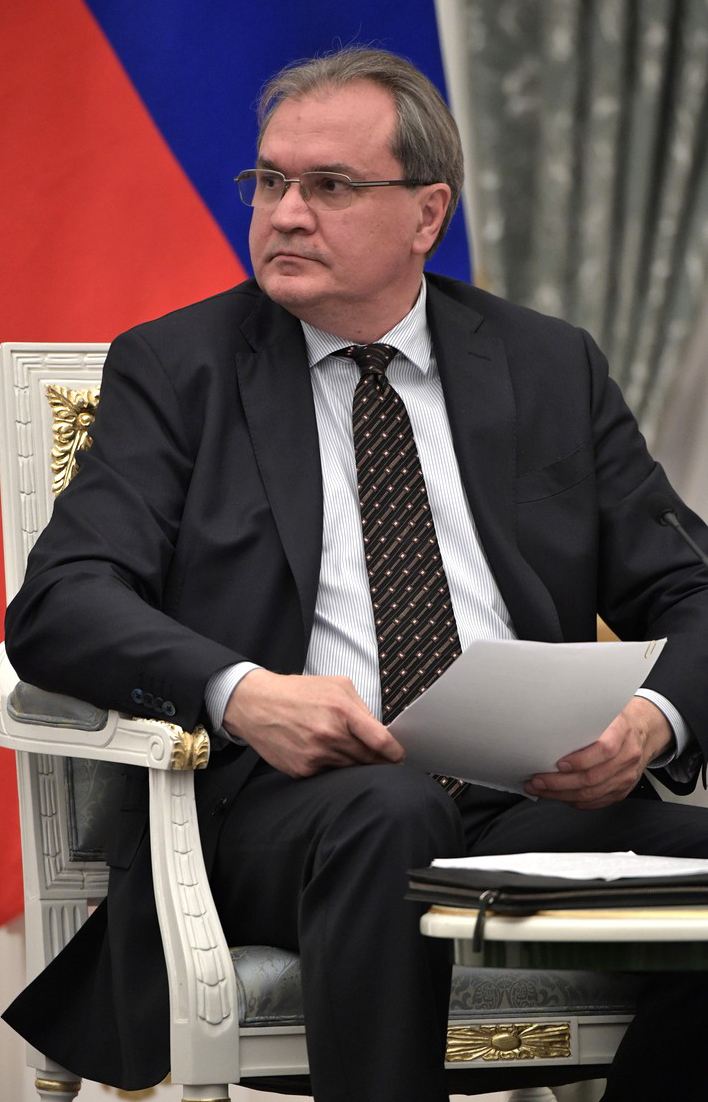
- Fadeyev in 2017

Chairman of the Presidential Council for Civil Society and Human Rights
- Incumbent
- Assumed office 22 October 2019
- President: Vladimir Putin
- Preceded by: Mikhail Fedotov

Secretary of the Civic Chamber of the Russian Federation
- In office 19 June 2017 – 21 October 2019
- Preceded by: Vyacheslav Bocharov
- Succeeded by: Lidia Mikheyeva

Personal details
- Born: 10 October 1960 (age 65) Tashkent, Uzbek SSR, Soviet Union
- Education: Moscow Institute of Physics and Technology

Valery Aleksandrovich Fadeyev (Russian: Вале́рий Алекса́ндрович Фаде́ев; born 10 October 1960) is a Russian journalist and public figure who currently serves as the Chairman of the Human Rights Council. He previously served as secretary of the Civic Chamber of the Russian Federation.

== Biography ==
Valery Fadeyev was born in 1960 in Tashkent, now capital of Uzbekistan. After graduating from the Faculty of Management of the Moscow Institute of Physics and Technology in 1983, he served in the strategic missile forces of the USSR. In 1988–90 he worked in the Energy Research Institute of the Soviet Academy of Sciences. In 1993-1995, he was deputy for Yevgeny Yasin as director of the Expert Institute of the Russian Union of Industrialists and Entrepreneurs.

In 1992–95 he worked as an expert, scientific editor of the Kommersant Weekly magazine of the Kommersant publishing house. In 1995–98 Fadeyev was the first deputy editor-in-chief of the Expert Magazine, and subsequently its editor-in-chief from 1998 to 2017. Ivan Davydov, former director of Internet projects development for Expert Magazine, described Fadeyev as "a tragic figure in his own way, who shows what cooperation with the authorities can turn an intelligent and talented person into."

Fadeyev was a member of the Civic Chamber of Russia since its creation in 2005 to 2014. In 2017 he was elected secretary of the 6th composition of this consultative body. He is a member of the Board of Trustees of Oleg Deripaska's charity fund Volnoe Delo. and the director of the Institute of Public Planning. In 2011 Fadeyev became a member of the All-Russia People's Front's Central Council.

Until November 2019 Valery Fadeyev was a member of the Supreme Council of the United Russia party and deputy coordinator of its liberal platform. In 2016 he lost UR's primary in Komi Republic.

=== TV presenter ===
From October 2014 to June 2016 Fadeyev was the host of "Structure of the Moment" socio-political talk show on Channel One Russia. From September 2016 to June 2018 Fadeyev was the host of Sunday Time, the weekly news program of Channel One. Fadeyev left the TV due to his workload in the Civic Chamber. He himself described his work on television as a part-time job.

== Views ==
In his interview to the magazine "Russian Reporter" after being elected secretary of the Civic Chamber, Fadeyev stated that the activists who are opposing the government are "not our partners." The journalist inquired about the reason for this position, to which Fadeyev replied: "Do not confuse activism with provocation." During the January 2021 protest rallies, Fadeyev said that he does not see the harsh-performed detention of protesters as a violation of human rights.

In 2022, Fadeyev fully supported the Russian invasion of Ukraine.

In 2024, Fadeyev called for a Burka Ban in Russia.

== Sanctions ==
On June 18, 2021, he was added to the sanctions list of Ukraine.

On February 25, 2023, against the background of the Russian invasion of Ukraine, included in the EU sanctions list for actions that undermine the sovereignty and independence of Ukraine.

On March 2, 2023, he was added to the sanctions list of Switzerland.
