= Presidential Council for Civil Society and Human Rights =

Consultative body to the president of Russia

- Совет при Президенте Российской Федерации по развитию гражданского общества и правам человека
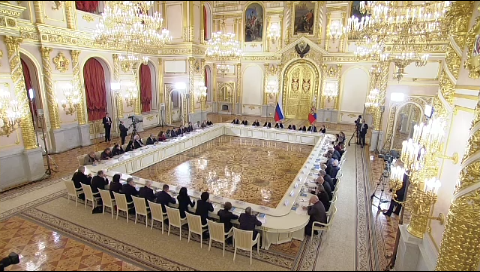

Agency overview
- Formed: 6 November 2004
- Preceding agency: Presidential Commission on Human Rights
- Headquarters: 4 Staraya Square, Moscow
- Agency executive: Valery Fadeyev, Chairman
- Website: president-sovet.ru

The Presidential Council for the Development of Civil Society and Human Rights (Russian: Совет при Президенте Российской Федерации по развитию гражданского общества и правам человека, romanized: Sovet pri Prezidente Rossiyskoy Federatsii po razvitiyu grazhdanskogo obshchestva i pravam cheloveka) is a consultative body to the President of the Russian Federation, tasked with assisting him in guaranteeing and protecting human rights and freedoms in Russia. Since October 21, 2019, the chairman of the Council has been Valery Fadeyev.

The Council was created in 2004 by reorganizing the Commission on human rights, which existed since November 1993.

The Council currently consists of 47 people, including political scientist Sergey Karaganov, filmmaker Alexander Sokurov, journalist Kirill Vyshinsky and entrepreneur Igor Ashmanov.

In previous years, the Council has included retired judge of the Constitutional Court of Russia Tamara Morshchakova, political scientist Ekaterina Schulmann, lawyer Pavel Chikov, journalist Nikolai Svanidze and economist Yevgeny Yasin.

== Chairmen ==
Chair		Took office	Left office	Length of service	Ref.
1	Ella Pamfilova (1953–)	1 November 2004	30 July 2010	5 years, 271 days	
2	Mikhail Fedotov (1949–)	12 October 2010	22 October 2019	9 years, 10 days	
3	Valery Fadeyev (1960–)	22 October 2019	Incumbent	5 years, 154 days	

== Criticism ==
On October 5, 2009, the Council issued a statement condemning the actions of the Nashi activists against journalist Alexander Podrabinek. The original version of the statement, posted on the Council's website, did not condemn Podrabinek's frank statements towards WWII veterans. However, the statement was later edited (according to some sources, after a call from a high-ranking official to Ella Pamfilova) and included remarks that the Council did not agree with Podrabinek's position. Valery Fadeyev, future chairman of the council, described its behavior within Podrabinek controversy as strange and unnatural.

A body that should contribute to the prevention of conflicts, to act as an independent arbiter in disputes, suddenly endorses one of the parties. And this only fuels the conflict. The story with a statement made on behalf of the Council without the consent of its individual members also looks absurd."

Journalist Maksim Shevchenko, who was a member of the Council in 2012–18, described its activities as follows:

All the activities of the council turned into the creation of the useless OTR and the memorial to the victims of political repressions. But I don’t remember any specific actions to protect human rights.
