= Svetlana Goryacheva =

Russian stateswoman and political figure (born 1947)

- Светлана Горячева
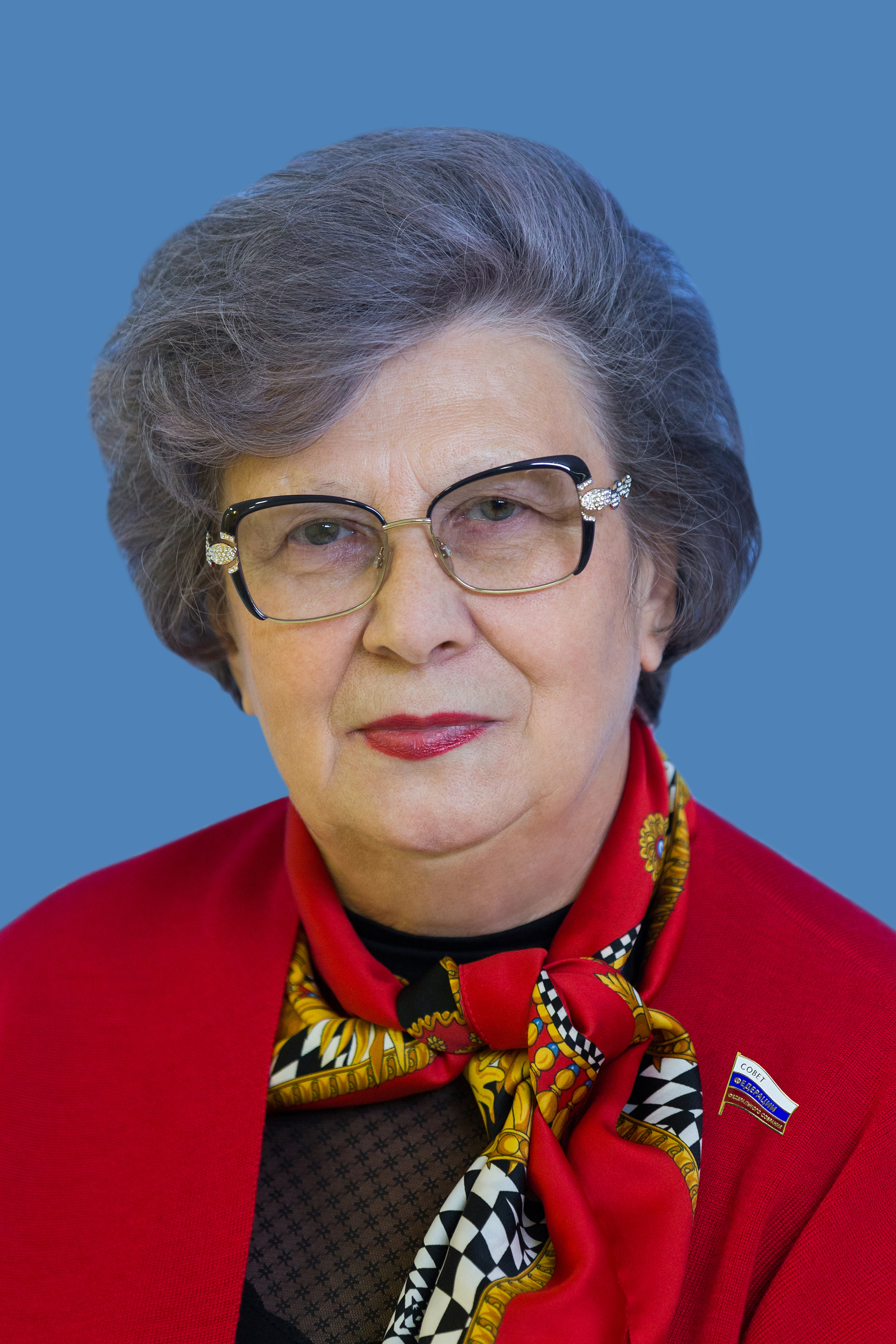
- Goryacheva in 2014

Senator from Primorsky Krai
- In office 22 September 2014 – 15 September 2023
- Preceded by: Tatyana Zabolotnaya
- Succeeded by: Aleksandr Rolik

Personal details
- Born: 3 June 1947 (age 79) Anuchinsky District, RSFSR, Soviet Union
- Party: United Russia
- Education: Far Eastern Federal University
- Awards: Order of Honour; Medal "For Merit in Conducting the All-Russian Population Census"; Medal "In Commemoration of the 850th Anniversary of Moscow"

Svetlana Petrovna Goryacheva (Russian: Светла́на Петро́вна Горя́чева; née Bezdetko; born June 3, 1947) is a Russian politician. She was a deputy of the State Duma from the party A Just Russia, and served as Deputy Chairman of the Committee on Rules and Organization and the deputy parliamentary leader of A Just Russia. Goryacheva was born in Risovy, a village in Anuchinsky District, Primorsky Krai.

She was an elected a deputy of the State Duma in 1995, and sat as such from 1996 until 2014. She is also a member of the Parliamentary Assembly of the Council of Europe.

Since September 2014, she has represented the Legislative Assembly of Primorsky Krai in the Federation Council. First Deputy Chairman of the Federation Council Committee on Rules and Organization of parliamentary activity.

At the end of 2012, she spoke in favor of banning the adoption of Russian orphans by U.S. citizens, arguing that some adopted children “will be tortured, used for organ transplants, or for sexual entertainment,” and that most of them in the United States “will be recruited for war, possibly even against Russia.”

== Sanctions ==
She was sanctioned by the UK government in 2022 in relation to the Russo-Ukrainian War.

Due to her support of the Russian invasion of Ukraine, the EU, US, UK, and other countries added Goryacheva to their sanctions lists.
