= September 2018 Primorsky Krai gubernatorial election =

Election of Governor, made by residents of Primorsky Krai

- 9–16 September 2018
- Turnout: 30.23% (1st round); 35.43% (2nd round)
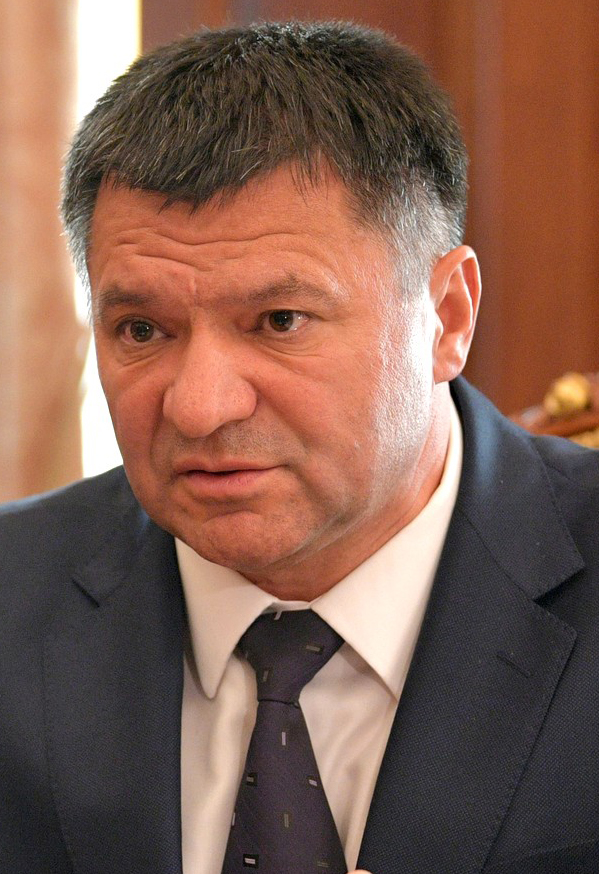

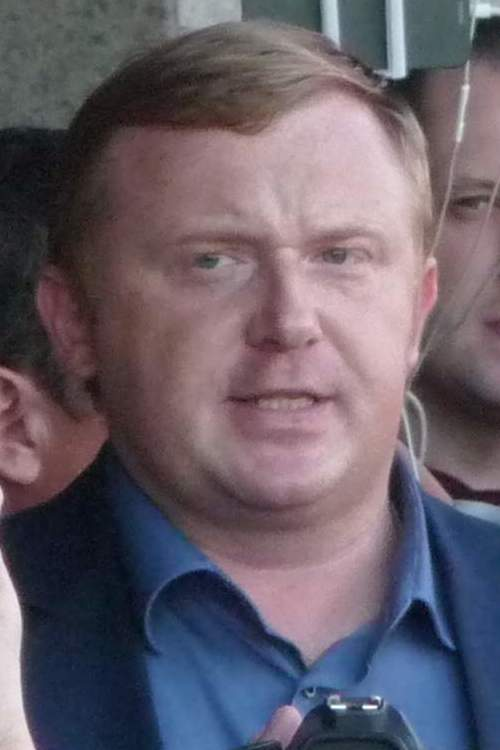
Candidate	Andrey Tarasenko	Andrey Ishchenko
Party	United Russia	CPRF
Popular vote	253,200	245,550
Percentage	49.55%	48.06%
Governor before election
Andrey Tarasenko
United Russia
Elected Governor
Election results annulled
Oleg Kozhemyako becomes acting governor

The Primorsky Krai gubernatorial election was held on 9–16 September 2018.

In the first round, held on 9 September (which was the common election day in Russia), none of the candidates received an absolute majority. The candidates proceeding to the second round, scheduled for 16 September, were incumbent Acting Governor Andrey Tarasenko, nominated by the United Russia, and Andrey Ishchenko, nominated by the Communist Party.

The second round of election was subject to public protest due to perceived inconsistencies in the counting of votes. During most of the counting, Ishchenko was in the lead by a margin of around 5%. However, after 95% of votes had been counted, Tarasenko began to gain ground. By 99% counted, he had gained a lead over Ishchenko. The official final results indicated Tarasenko had won with 49.55% of votes to Ishchenko's 48.06%, a margin of 7,650 votes.

The sudden shift in the results triggered accusations of electoral fraud, and the Central Electoral Commissions sent representatives to Primorsky Krai to review the situation. On 19 September, they recommended invalidating the election results. On 20 September, the Regional Election Commission followed this recommendation and officially invalidated the results, leading to a new election held in December.

== Previous events ==
Previous gubernatorial election in Primorsky Krai were held on 14 September 2014, Vladimir Miklushevsky was elected as Governor. On 4 October 2017, he resigned, and Russian President Vladimir Putin appointed Andrey Tarasenko as Acting Governor.

== Candidates ==
Five candidates were registered to participate in the election

Candidate	Party	Office
Andrey Andreychenko	Liberal Democratic Party	Member of the State Duma
Andrey Ishchenko	Communist Party	Member of the Legislative Assembly of Primorsky Krai
Alexey Kozitsky	A Just Russia	Member of the Legislative Assembly of Primorsky Krai
Andrey Tarasenko	United Russia	Incumbent Acting Governor
Yulia Tolmacheva	Party of Pensioners	Member of the Legislative Assembly of Primorsky Krai

== Background ==
Three months before these elections, in June 2018, the government of Russia announced the very unpopular pension reform presuming a gradual increase in the retirement age by five years. The planned reform has provoked countrywide protests. For this reason, the elections proceeded on a background of an aversion to the governmental party “United Russia” (which was the only party in the parliament supporting the reform) as to the betrayers.

In the second round, the anti-reform forces were consolidated around Ishchenko as a person not belonging to that party. So, despite Tarasenko has unequivocally won the first round, Ishchenko succeeded in obtaining a comparable number of votes in the second round.

== Results ==
The results of the first (left) and second (right) rounds by territorial election commissions. Andrey Tarasenko Andrey Ishchenko

Summary of the 9 and 16 September 2018 Primorsky Krai gubernatorial election results
Candidate	Party		1st round		2nd round	
Candidate	Party		Votes	%	Votes	%
Andrey Tarasenko	United Russia	UR	206,300	46.56	253,200	49.55
Andrey Ishchenko	Communist Party	CPRF	109,129	24.63	245,550	48.06
Yulia Tolmacheva	Party of Pensioners	RPPSS	47,832	10.80		
Andrey Andreychenko	Liberal Democratic Party	LDPR	41,066	9.27		
Alexey Kozitsky	A Just Russia	SR	21,416	4.83		
Valid votes			425,743	96.09	498,750	97.61
Blank ballots			17,306	3.91	12,198	2.39
Total			443,049	100.00	510,948	100.00
Turnout			443,049	30.23	510,948	35.43
Registered voters			1,465,538		1,442,328	
Official results published by the Primorsky Krai Electoral Commission

Exit polls on the day of the second round have also shown a victory of Tarasenko.

Poll source	Tarasenko	Ishchenko
KC Expert-group	53%	47%

== Fairness of election ==
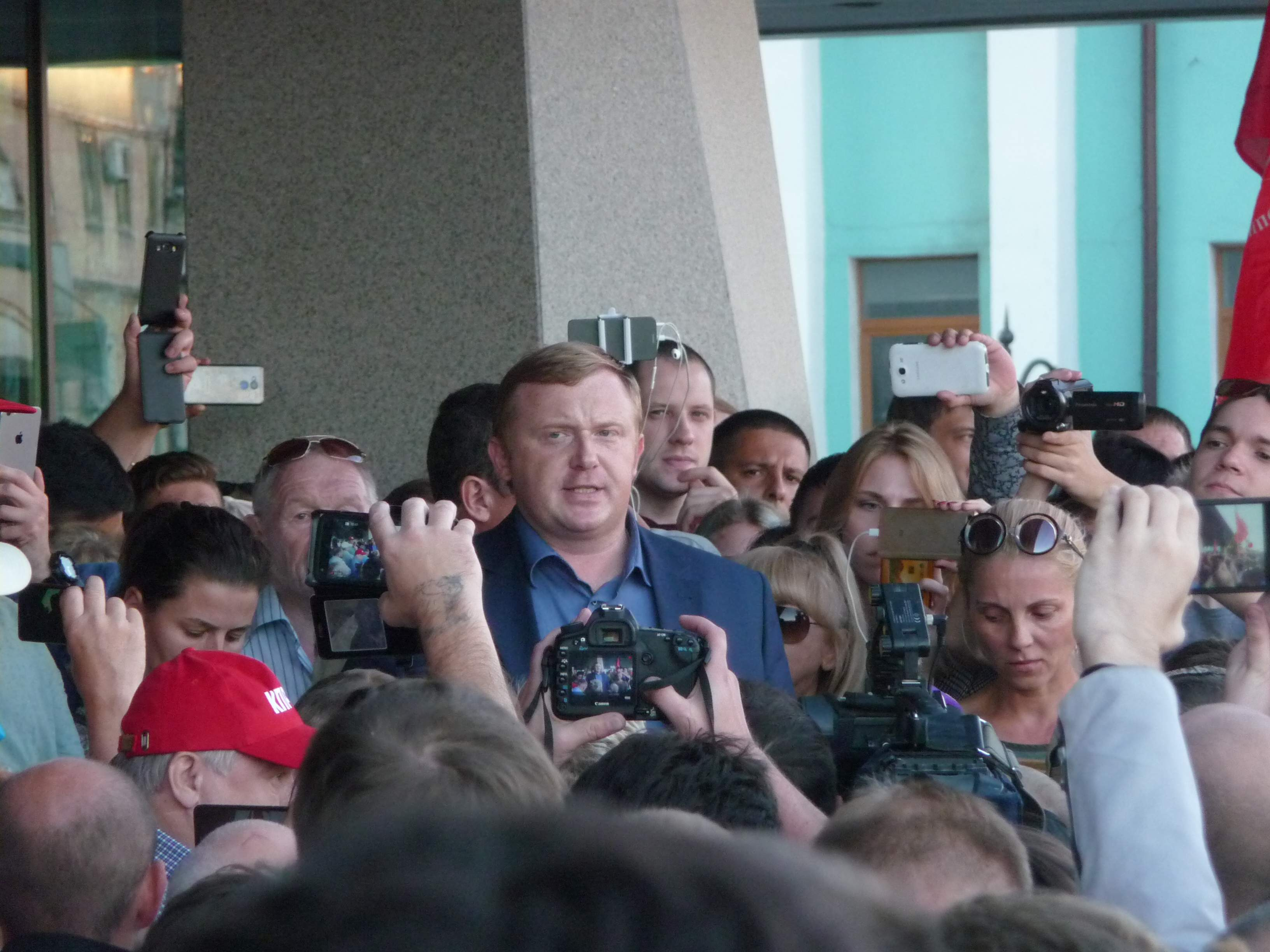
Andrey Ishchenko at a rally against rigging the election results near the building of the Government of Primorsky Krai

After counting 95% of the protocols of the second round, the candidate from the Communist party Ishchenko won by a significant margin — 51.6% against 45.8%. After processing 99% of the protocols, the ratio changed in favor of the incumbent Acting Governor Andrey Tarasenko — 49.02% against 48.56%. In particular, according to the CEC website, if we compare the results after processing 98.77% of the protocols and after processing 99.03% of the protocols, the results of Ishchenko fell by 5 votes, and Tarasenko grew by 13,595 votes.

Representatives of the Communist party announced massive fraud in favor of Tarasenko in the vote count. Andrey Ishchenko declared falsifications in the cities Vladivostok, Artyom, Nakhodka and Ussuriysk and declared hunger strike. In addition, 13 protocols are still being held and not published in one of the districts of Vladivostok. In turn, the election headquarters of Andrey Tarasenko accused rivals of bribing voters.

On the night after the elections, during the counting of votes in the Territorial Election Commission of the Sovetsky district of Vladivostok (it is located in the building of the district administration), firefighters broke in. They said there was a call, that the fire alarm went off. They demanded that members of the electoral commission and observers leave the polling station. At the same time, there was no smoke or other traces of fire in the building. Members of the electoral commission were forced to leave the building, leaving the electoral documents. Subsequently, on 18 September, the Regional Election Commission canceled the results of voting at 12 polling stations accountable to the Sovetsky district Territorial Election Commission. A similar situation has developed in other cities of Primorye. For example, the Territorial Election Commission building of the Ussuriysk urban district was cordoned off by police officers. When the member of Legislative Assembly of Primorsky Krai Anatoly Dolgachev and member of the State Duma Yury Afonin tried to get there, they were told that it is impossible, as "the lock is broken".

== Annulation of the results ==
On 17 September, Chairwoman of the Central Election Commission Ella Pamfilova asked the candidates to provide the CEC with materials on possible violations and said that the results of the election will not be approved until the CEC examines all complaints.

On 19 September in Primorsky Krai came to a special commission of the CEC to verify complaints of violations in the election.

Since the election of the Governor is within the jurisdiction of the Regional Election Commission (REC), the Central Election Commission cannot influence them, but it can make recommendations to the REC. On 19 September, the CEC unanimously recommended to recognize the results of the gubernatorial election invalid. The final decision of annulation was accordingly taken by the Regional Election Commission on 20 September.

== See also ==
- List of annulled elections
