= Aleksandr Rolik =

- Александр Ролик
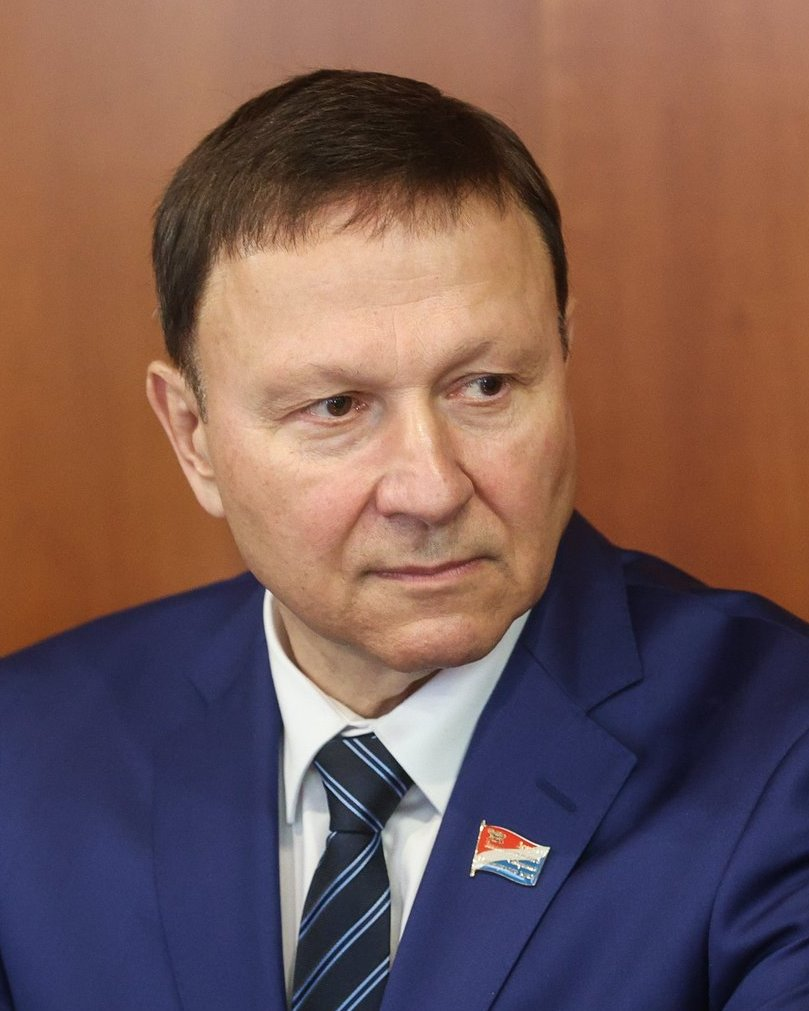

Senator from Primorsky Krai
- In office 15 September 2023 – Incumbent
- Preceded by: Svetlana Goryacheva

Personal details
- Born: 28 April 1956 (age 70) Rostov-on-Don, RSFSR, Soviet Union
- Party: United Russia
- Education: Far Eastern Federal University
- Awards: Honoured Lawyer of Russia

Aleksandr Ivanovich Rolik (Russian: Александр Иванович Ролик; born April 28, 1956, in Rostov-on-Don) is a Russian politician. He is a Senator of the Federation Council and a representative of the executive branch in the Federal Council from Primorsky Krai. He is a member of the Federation Council Committee on Federal Structure, Regional Policy, Local Self-Government, and Northern Affairs. He is a member of the United Russia party and an Honoured Lawyer of the Russian Federation (2007). A lawyer by education, he served in the military from 1981 to 1992 in operational and leadership positions in state security agencies. He subsequently held leadership positions in various agencies in Primorsky Krai.

== Biography ==
Aleksandr Rolik was born on April 28, 1956, in Rostov-on-Don. He graduated from the Faculty of Law of the Far Eastern National University.

After graduating, he held the position of full-time secretary of the Komsomol committee of FENU. He was a member of the Communist Party of the Soviet Union.

From 1981 to 1992 he served in the military in operational and leadership positions in state security agencies. From 1992 to 2003 he served in the tax police, and in his final years, served as head of the Federal Tax Police Service of the Russian Federation for Primorsky Krai. From 2003 to 2010 he served as Head of the Federal Drug Control Service of the Russian Federation for Primorsky Krai. From 2010 to 2012 he served as Head of the Ministry of Justice of the Russian Federation for Primorsky Krai. From 2012 to 2016 he served as Vice Governor of Primorsky Krai. On September 18, 2016, he was elected as a deputy of the Legislative Assembly of Primorsky Krai of the sixth convocation on the party lists representing the United Russia party. On October 5, 2016, he was elected Chairman of the Legislative Assembly of Primorsky Krai.

In March 2017, in his article for the Parliamentary Newspaper, he generally assessed the results of the assembly’s activities positively, particularly emphasizing the political stability achieved in Primorsky Krai over five years.
