= Mikhail Fedotov =

Russian jurist and human rights activist (born 1949)

- Михаил Федотов
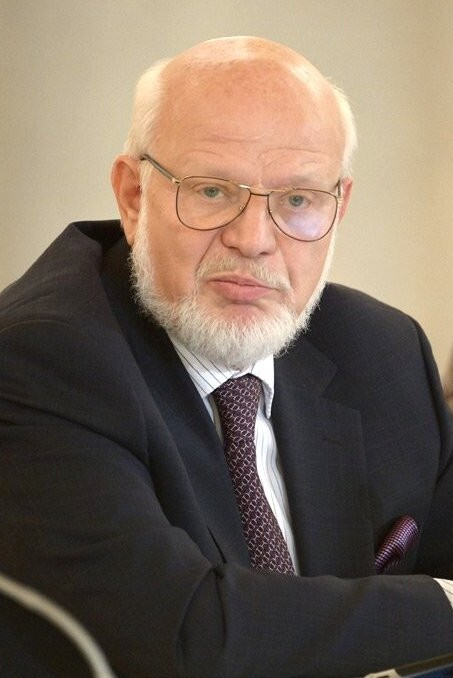
- Fedotov in 2014

Chairman of the Presidential Council for Civil Society and Human Rights
- In office 12 October 2010 – 22 October 2019
- President: Dmitry Medvedev; Vladimir Putin
- Preceded by: Ella Pamfilova
- Succeeded by: Valery Fadeyev

Permanent Representative to UNESCO
- In office 23 September 1993 – 24 January 1998
- President: Boris Yeltsin
- Preceded by: Vladimir Lomeiko
- Succeeded by: Yevgeny Sidorov

Minister of Press and Mass Media
- In office 23 December 1992 – 23 August 1993
- President: Boris Yeltsin
- Prime Minister: Viktor Chernomyrdin
- Preceded by: Mikhail Poltoranin
- Succeeded by: Vladimir Shumeyko

Personal details
- Born: 18 September 1949 (age 77) Moscow, Soviet Union
- Party: Union of Right Forces
- Education: Moscow State University (Faculty of Law); All-Union Correspondence Institute of Law
- Mikhail Fedotov's voice Fedotov on the Echo of Moscow program, 11 March 2013

Mikhail Alexandrovich Fedotov (Russian: Михаил Александрович Федотов; born 18 September 1949) is a Russian jurist, politician, human rights activist, and former diplomat.

== Biography ==
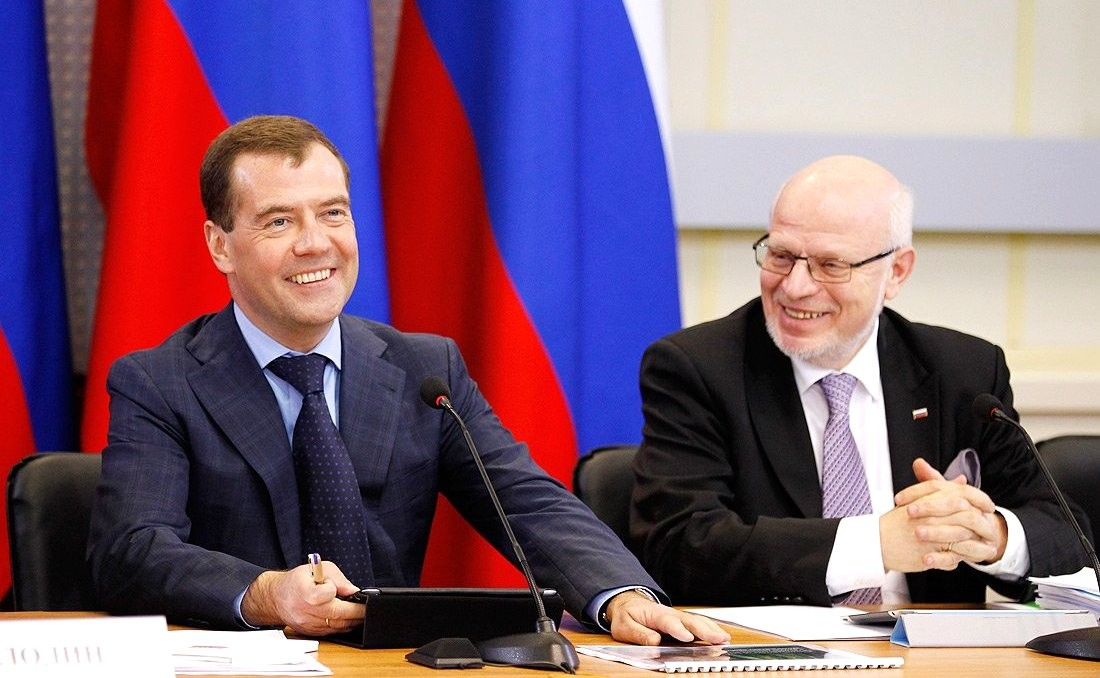
Fedotov with President Medvedev, 15 March 2012

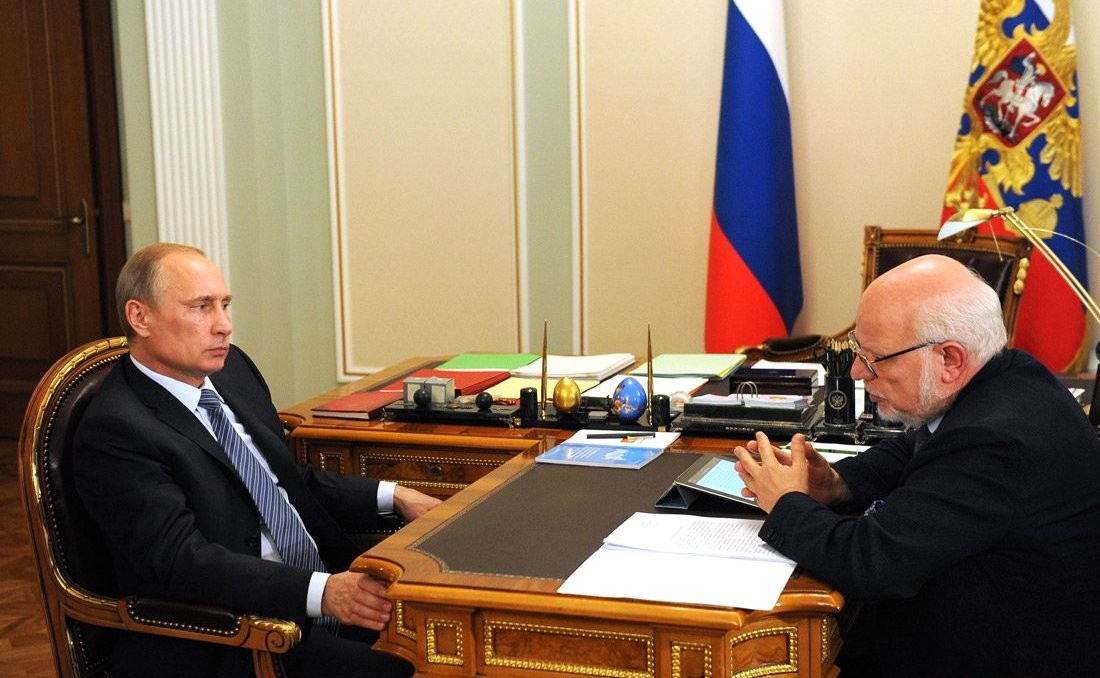
Fedotov with President Putin, 29 July 2014

Fedotov was born in Moscow into a family of lawyers. In 1966, he entered the law faculty at Lomonosov Moscow State University, but was expelled in 1968 for participating in the human rights movement. At the request of several professors, he was allowed to return to the evening department of the university. He also worked as a journalist for the newspaper Vechernyaya Moskva. He graduated with a degree in law from Moscow State University in 1972, followed by postgraduate studies in the All-Union Correspondence Institute of Law in 1976. In 1976-1990 he taught at the All-Union Correspondence Institute of Law at the Department of State Law. At the same time, he created draft laws "On the Press and other mass media" (which eliminated preliminary censorship), "On Public Associations", "On Mass Media", "On Archives", "On Publishing". He headed the working group on the preparation of the draft law "On Copyright and related rights".

In September 1990 – May 1992, he served as the Deputy Minister of the Press and Mass Media in Russia. From December 1992 to August 1993, he held the position of Minister of Press and Information in Russia. In the summer of 1993, he fought against the Supreme Council's introduction of amendments to Russia's law "On Mass Media". After the vote on these amendments, Fedotov resigned as minister.

Between September 1993 and January 1998, Fedotov served as Russia's Permanent Representative to UNESCO.

Mikhail Fedotov's bid for the position of judge of the Constitutional Court of Russia has been rejected twice: once in 1991, by the 5th Congress of People's Deputies of Russia, and again in 1997, by the Federation Council.

Fedotov has represented the President of Russia before the Constitutional Court in cases involving the CPSU, the National Salvation Front, and the introduction of oversight boards on state TV and radio by the Congress of People's Deputies. He has also represented the president at Congresses of the People's Representatives and at the Supreme Council, has represented the Government of Russia at the constitutional assembly, and was a member of the working group on drafting the Constitution of Russia.

After being appointed as chair of the Presidential Council for Civil Society and Human Rights in 2010, Mikhail Fedotov said that he saw "de-Stalinizing public consciousness" as one of the main goals of the council. On 1 March 2011, the Council revealed a project to "de-Stalinize" the Russian history of the 20th century. The proposed program has elicited contradictory reactions in Russian society. Leader of the Yabloko Party Sergei Mitrokhin, politician Vladimir Ryzhkov, as well as historian Andrey Zubov, have all expressed support for the initiative. Prime Minister of Lithuania Andrius Kubilius has welcomed the Human Rights Council's proposal to recognize the USSR's responsibility for genocide during World War II, describing it as an "attempt to look honestly at country's history and conscience". Lithuanian Foreign Minister Gabrielius Landsbergis has positively assessed Fedotov's work in this area. However, members of the Presidential Council Emil Pain and Alexey Pushkov have taken a critical stance towards the proposed "de-Stalinization" program, as they believe it cannot serve as a basis for national reconciliation in modern Russia and will lead to further national division. Several experts, historians, and politicians have strongly criticized the "de-Stalinization" initiative and the activities of Fedotov. Communist Party leader Gennady Zyuganov has expressed Fedotov's personal responsibility for Russia's current troubles, while the Council he heads has been compared to foreign "Russophobic" centers. Valery Fyodorov, CEO of Russian Public Opinion Research Center, has stated that as the "homegrown de-Stalinizers" continue their efforts, their reputation will continue to decline, while Stalin's image will likely gain favor.

== Honours ==
- Russia: Order of Friendship (2014)
- Russia: Laureate of the Award of the Government of the Russian Federation for the field of printed media (2009)
- Russia: Honoured Lawyer of Russia (1999)
- UNESCO: UNESCO Medal in honor of the 50th anniversary of the Universal Declaration of Human Rights (1999)
- (Soviet Union) USSR: Laureate of the Union of Journalists of the USSR Award (1990)
