= Ella Pamfilova =

Russian politician (born 1953)

- Элла Памфилова
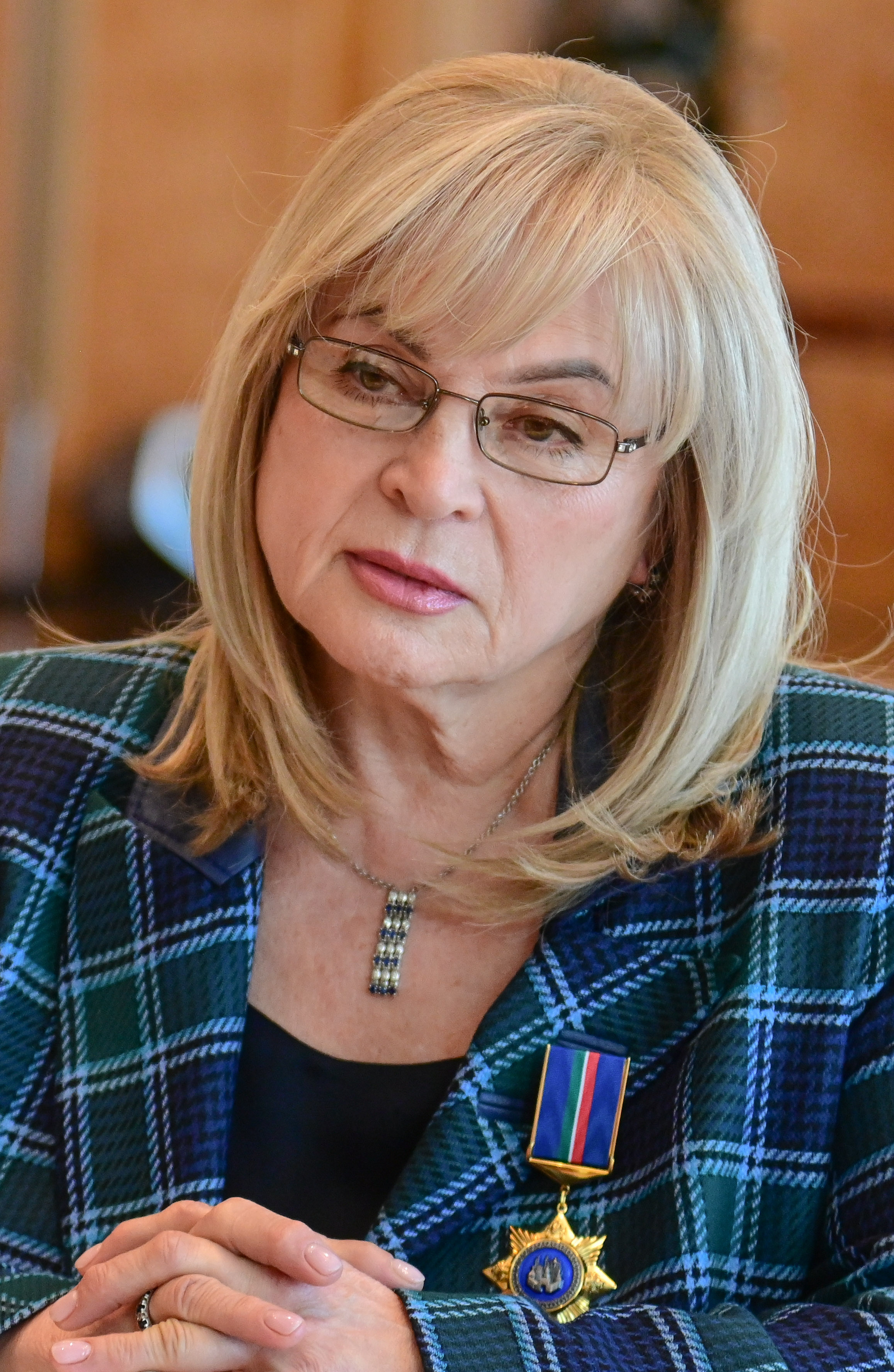
- Pamfilova in 2025

Chair of the Central Election Commission
- Incumbent
- Assumed office 28 March 2016
- President: Vladimir Putin
- Preceded by: Vladimir Churov

4th Commissioner for Human Rights
- In office 18 March 2014 – 25 March 2016
- President: Vladimir Putin
- Preceded by: Vladimir Lukin
- Succeeded by: Tatyana Moskalkova

Chair of the Presidential Council for Civil Society and Human Rights
- In office 6 November 2004 – 30 July 2010
- President: Vladimir Putin; Dmitry Medvedev
- Preceded by: Office established
- Succeeded by: Mikhail Fedotov

Minister of Social Protection
- In office 15 November 1991 – 2 March 1994
- Prime Minister: Boris Yeltsin (extraordinary); Yegor Gaidar (acting); Viktor Chernomyrdin
- Preceded by: Viktor Kaznacheyev
- Succeeded by: Lyudmila Bezlepkina

Personal details
- Born: Ella Aleksandrovna Pamfilova; 12 September 1953 (age 73) Olmaliq, Uzbek SSR, Soviet Union (now Uzbekistan)
- Party: Independent
- Other political affiliations: Communist Party of the Soviet Union (1985—1990); Republican Party of Russia (1995—1996)
- Education: Moscow Power Engineering Institute

Ella Alexanderovna Pamfilova (Russian: Элла Александровна Памфилова, née Lekomtseva [Лекомцева]; born 12 September 1953) is a Russian politician serving as chair of Russia's Central Election Commission since March 2016. Previously she served as Russia's Commissioner for Human Rights from 2014 to 2016, and as Minister of Social Protection from 1991 to 1994. She also chaired the Presidential Council for Civil Society and Human Rights from 2004 to 2010, and was a deputy of the 1st and 2nd convocations of the State Duma. She ran as a candidate during the 2000 Russian presidential election, becoming the first female presidential candidate in Russian history, and received 1.01% of the vote.

In December 2017, Pamfilova barred Alexei Navalny from participating in the following presidential election. In January 2024, she barred Boris Nadezhdin from participating in the following presidential election.

In March 2022, Canada imposed sanctions on Pamfilova as part of "close associates of the regime", following the Russian invasion of Ukraine. Since October 2022, she has been under sanctions of the European Union for "organising the illegal referenda in the occupied regions of Ukraine". In November 2022, she was added to the UK sanctions list for "organising the sham referendums in the four temporarily occupied areas of Ukraine" and "actively supporting Russia’s forced mobilisation".

In December 2022, the United States Department of the Treasury announced sanctions against Pamfilova for "overseeing and monitoring sham referendums held in areas of Russia-controlled Ukraine that were rife with incidents of clear voter coercion and intimidation". For similar reasons, she is also on the sanctions lists of Ukraine, Australia, New Zealand, and Switzerland. She has been under Japan's sanctions since January 2023.

== Biography ==
=== Early life and career ===
Ella Pamfilova (née Lekomtseva) was born in Olmaliq, Soviet Uzbekistan.

After graduating from Moscow Power Engineering Institute in 1976, Pamfilova started her career on the central repair and engineering works in Moscow as an engineer. She was also the first woman to head the country's state controlled pet food company "Belka", which she oversaw from 1984 to 1986. She went on to become a People's Deputy of the Soviet Union and a member of the Supreme Soviet of the Soviet Union.

During the period 1991 until 1994, she led the Ministry of Social Protection under President Boris Yeltsin. Between 1994 and 1999, Pamfilova was elected three times as a deputy of the State Duma.

In 2000 she was the first woman to run as a candidate in a Russian presidential election campaign. However, she faced stiff competition from Yabloko leader Grigory Yavlinsky for the liberal vote, and her share of the vote was very low.

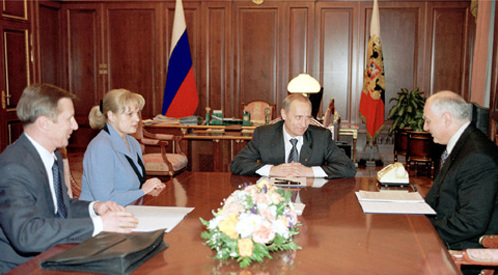
Pamfilova during a meeting with President Putin in January 2001

In July 2002, by presidential decree, she was appointed Chair of the Presidential Human Rights Commission. In November 2004, following the reorganization of the Commission, she was reappointed as Chair of the Presidential Council for Civil Society and Human Rights.

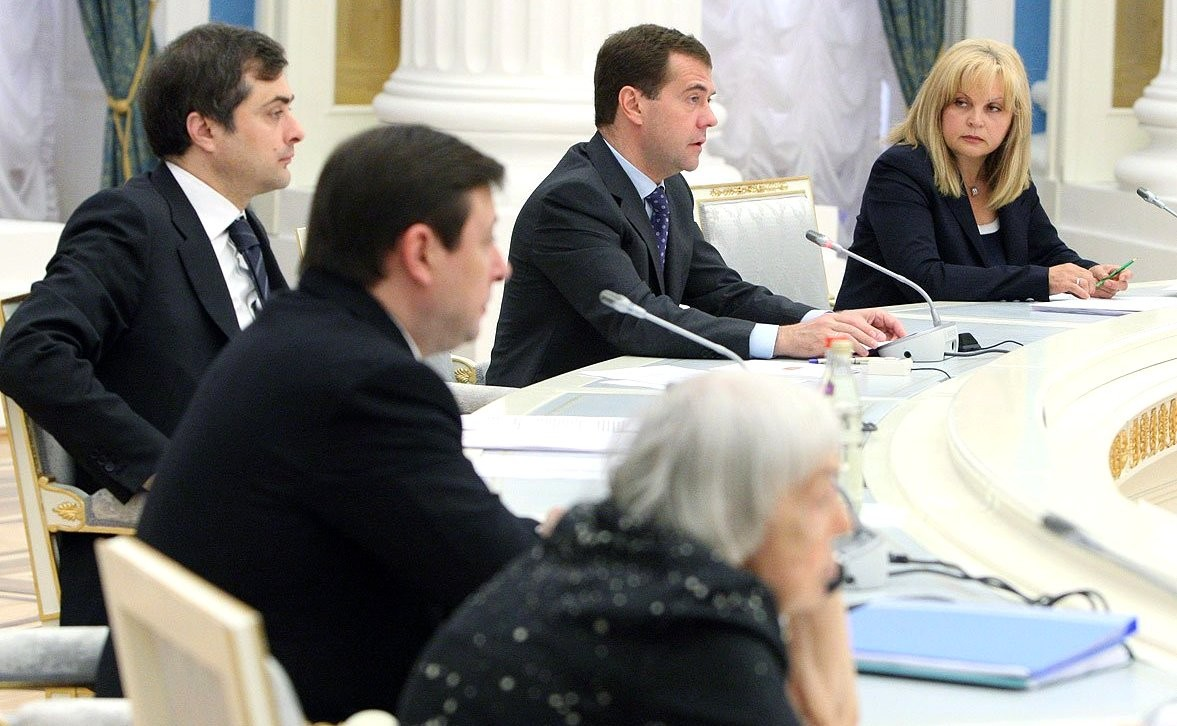
Pamfilova (right) during a Presidential Council for Civil Society and Human Rights meeting in May 2010

At the State Duma session of 7 October 2009, a United Russia deputy, Robert Shlegel, proposed that President Vladimir Putin dismiss Pamfilova from the Human Rights Council for advocating Alexander Podrabinek's rights. The watchdog, led by Pamfilova, had called the protests “a persecution campaign … organized by irresponsible adventurists from Nashi” and said the activists were showing open signs of extremism.

In June 2010, the Human Rights Council, in an appeal to President Dmitry Medvedev, protested against amendments expanding the powers of the Federal Security Service (FSB), which it stated were reviving "the worst and illegal practices of a totalitarian state". Medvedev did not support the protest, stating that he had initiated the draft law himself.

In 2013, human rights activist Lev Ponomaryov suggested that Vladimir Putin consider Pamfilova as a candidate for the office of Commissioner for Human Rights, succeeding to Vladimir Lukin. In January 2014, Russia's Civic Chamber endorsed Pamfilova's candidacy for this position.

=== Commissioner for Human Rights ===
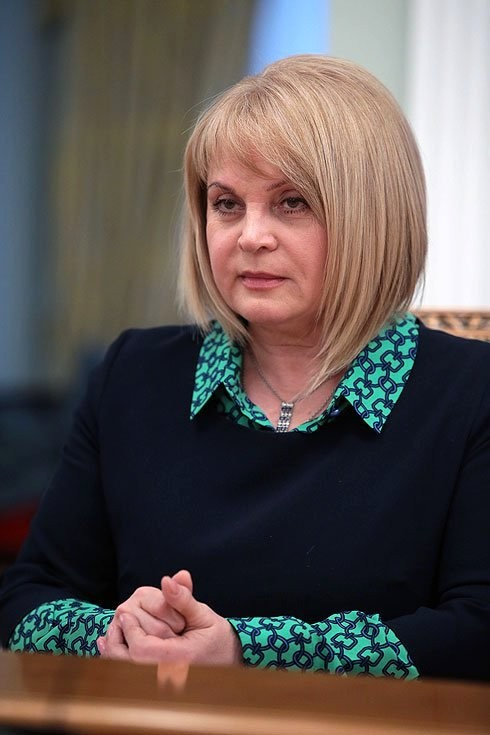
Pamfilova in 2014

During her tenure as Russia's Commissioner for Human Rights, Ella Pamfilova achieved certain successes in enhancing the international authority of the institution and in publicizing its activities. Under her leadership, in December 2014, the Russian Commissioner institution was granted the international "A" status, which signifies full compliance with the Paris Principles and grants the right to speak at sessions of United Nations human rights mechanisms.

However, during her two years in office, Pamfilova filed fewer appeals to the courts on behalf of applicants compared to her predecessor, Vladimir Lukin. Under her leadership, the Commissioner's activities began to categorize so-called "high-profile cases" separately, concerning individuals well-known in the media who had encountered problems with the justice system.

In 2015, in an article by legal scholars from the Moscow University of the Ministry of Internal Affairs of Russia, the Commissioner's report for 2014 was criticized for "the dominance of politics over law". Vladimir Pligin, who at the time was head of the State Duma Committee on Constitutional Legislation and State Building, however, gave a high assessment to the Commissioner's report.

=== Central Election Commission Chair ===
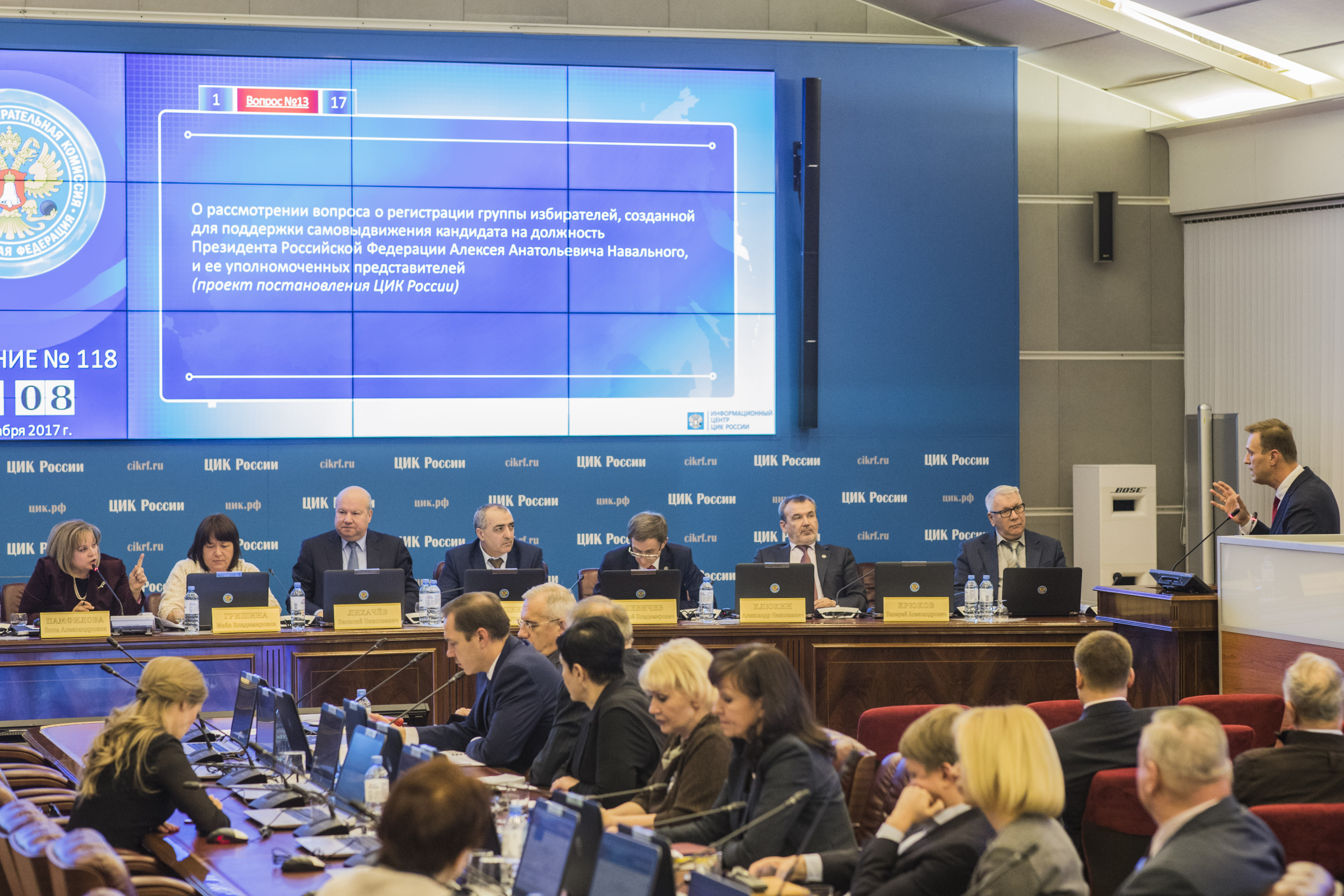
Pamfilova (left) arguing with Alexei Navalny before denying his right to be in the ballot on the upcoming presidential elections, December 2017

On 3 March 2016, Pamfilova was appointed to the Central Election Commission by the President of Russia. On 28 March 2016, she was elected Chair of the Central Election Commission with 14 out of 15 votes.

In April 2016, negotiations took place between representatives of the Anti-Corruption Foundation and Pamfilova regarding violations in the elections to the municipal council of a rural settlement in Barvikha, Moscow Oblast. Video evidence was presented showing public sector employees being bused in for early voting. In response, Pamfilova noted that "the internet is not facts" and that "such falsifications cannot be called widespread". Nevertheless, the Central Election Commission obliged the territorial election commission of the Odintsovsky District to annul the decision to schedule those elections, which effectively led to new elections being called.

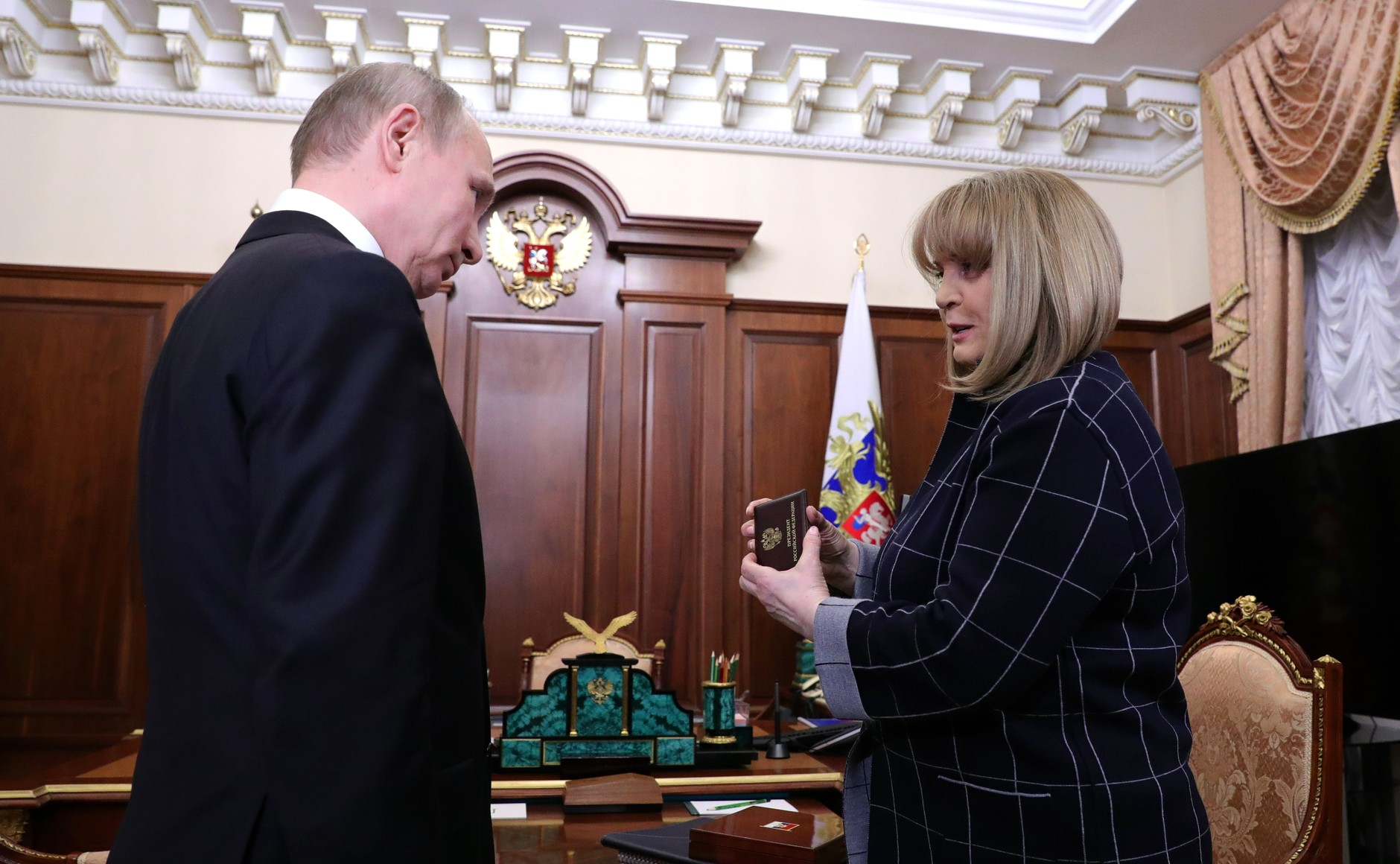
Pamfilova presents Vladimir Putin certificate of the president of Russia, April 2018

In August 2017, in an interview with for Kommersant, Ella Pamfilova stated that the municipal filter in its current form should be abolished. In April 2019, she proposed that governors and legislatures in 16 federal subjects consider amending regional laws to reduce the municipal filter threshold to 5%, and to 6% in Saint Petersburg. However, the filter was lowered only in Kurgan Oblast and Lipetsk Oblast, and by only 1%.

On 6 September 2019, Pamfilova was attacked at her home. The assailant entered her terrace, struck her several times with a stun gun, and fled. The attacker was later found to be legally insane. Commenting on the court's decision, Ella Pamfilova said: "If the experts say so, let them treat him. I am very familiar with all the details. I have seen the case files. I attended the court hearings twice. It ended as it ended. I'm no expert… Well, he looked quite calm; I didn't see any signs of being hounded or intimidated. I just want to forget this whole story as soon as possible".

On 19 March 2021, Vladimir Putin signed a decree appointing 5 members of the Central Election Commission under the presidential quota. The incumbent chair of the commission, Ella Pamfilova, was reappointed for a new term. On 29 March 2021, during the first meeting of the new commission, Pamfilova was re-elected as chair, serving until 2026.

In August 2023, Ella Pamfilova stated that Russia does not need democracy in its Western understanding, as in the West it is not a way of forming power through elections, nor the power of the majority, but the power of a minority. In September 2025, during a meeting with Putin, she proposed ending Russia's participation in the work of the Office for Democratic Institutions and Human Rights.

On 30 March 2026, Ella Pamfilova became the first chair of the Central Election Commission in Russian history to be re-elected for a third term.

==== 2018 Primorsky Krai gubernatorial election ====
During the controversial September 2018 Primorsky Krai gubernatorial election, with 97% of the votes counted, Communist Party candidate Andrey Ishchenko was confidently in the lead. However, at the last moment, he lost to the United Russia candidate, Andrey Tarasenko, who overtook him by 2,300 votes. Numerous electoral anomalies and videos with evidence of falsifications flooded the internet. At the end of voting day, the power supply unexpectedly went out at some polling stations. Pamfilova stated that the shift in the leader was due to late-arriving data from remote territories, some of which gave 100% of their votes to the United Russia candidate. Pamfilova explained the 100% turnout in some areas as votes from ship crews registered in Ussuriysk. After the Central Election Commission recorded the stuffing of 14,500 ballots for Tarasenko, Pamfilova agreed that the data from these precincts had been falsified. However, she recommended not just annulling the results from the suspect precincts, but invalidating the entire election. She also expressed hope that neither Tarasenko nor Ishchenko would run in the repeat election. Ultimately, the Primorsky Krai Election Commission declared the elections invalid. The Communist Party did not officially acknowledge the annulment of the election results, and Ishchenko stated that "victory had been stolen from him".

==== 2019 Moscow City Duma election ====
In 2019, an active election campaign for the Moscow City Duma took place, which was accompanied by significant scandals. Many independent candidates were barred from running under the pretext that the Central Election Commission had deemed their collected signatures to be forged. Mass rallies were held during the campaign, but Pamfilova's reaction to them was limited to remarks like: "you can hold them every day if you want, even right here under my windows", and "the effect of rallies on the Central Election Commission's decision-making is zero". At the same time, the Central Election Commission chair refused to consider the results of independent handwriting analyses, which had found the signatures to be authentic. Subsequently, Pamfilova claimed that a targeted campaign was being waged to discredit the Central Election Commission.

== Awards ==
=== Russian ===
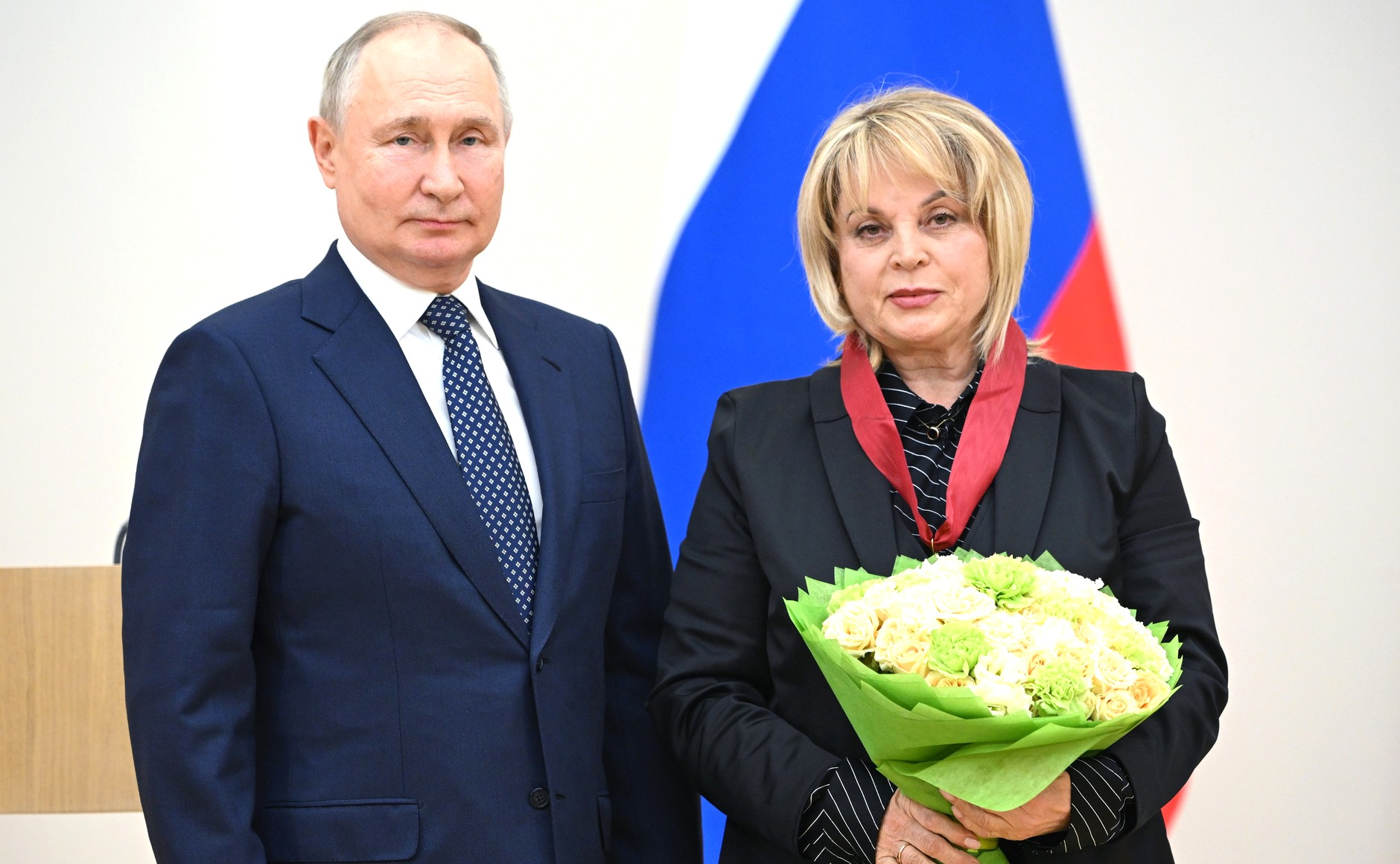
President Vladimir Putin awards Pamfilova the Order "For Merit to the Fatherland", 2nd class, November 2023

- Order "For Merit to the Fatherland":
  - 2nd class (2023)
  - 3rd class (2018)
  - 4th class (2003)
- Order of Alexander Nevsky (2020)
- Order of Friendship (2014)
- Order of Honour (2010)
- Russian Federation Presidential Certificate of Honour (2008)
- Medal of the Order "For Merit to the Fatherland", 1st class (2006)

=== Foreign ===
- Order of Friendship, 2nd class (Kazakhstan, 2020)
- National Order of the Legion of Honour (France, 2006)

Political offices
Preceded by Vladimir Churov	Chair of the Central Election Commission of Russia; 28 March 2016–present	Incumbent
