= Oleg Kozhemyako =

Russian politician (born 1962)

- Олег Кожемяко
- Kozhemyako in 2026

Deputy Prime Minister of Russia Presidential Envoy to the Far Eastern Federal District
- Incumbent
- Assumed office 22 October 2026
- President: Vladimir Putin
- Prime Minister: Mikhail Mishustin
- Preceded by: Yury Trutnev

5th Governor of Primorsky Krai
- In office 20 December 2018 – 22 October 2026
- Preceded by: Vladimir Miklushevsky; Andrey Tarasenko (acting)
- Succeeded by: Konstantin Shestakov (acting)

6th Governor of Sakhalin Oblast
- In office 25 March 2015 – 26 September 2018
- Preceded by: Aleksandr Khoroshavin
- Succeeded by: Vera Shcherbina (acting); Valery Limarenko

9th Governor of Amur Oblast
- In office 20 October 2008 – 25 March 2015
- Preceded by: Nikolay Kolesov
- Succeeded by: Alexander Kozlov

4th Governor of Koryak Autonomous Okrug
- In office 9 March 2005 – 1 July 2007
- Preceded by: Vladimir Loginov
- Succeeded by: Post abolished

Personal details
- Born: 17 March 1962 (age 64) Chernigovka, Primorsky Krai, Russian SFSR, Soviet Union
- Party: United Russia
- Education: Pacific State Economics University
- Awards: Order "For Merit to the Fatherland"; Russian Federation Presidential Certificate of Honour; Order of Honor (Belarus); Certificate of Honor of the Government of the Russian Federation
- Website: t.me/kozhemiakoofficial

Oleg Nikolayevich Kozhemyako (Russian: Олег Николаевич Кожемяко; born 17 March 1962) is a Russian politician serving as Deputy Prime Minister of Russia and Presidential Envoy to the Far Eastern Federal District since October 2026. Previously, he served as Governor of Primorsky Krai from 2018 to 2026, Governor of Sakhalin Oblast from 2015 to 2018, Governor of Amur Oblast from 2008 to 2015 and Governor of Koryak Autonomous Okrug from 2005 to 2007. Kozhemyako is the only individual who served governor of four different federal subjects of Russia.

== Career ==
Kozhemyako was appointed as the representative of the Legislative Assembly of Primorsky Krai in the Federation Council in 2002. Then, he was elected as the head of Koryak Autonomous Okrug on 15 April 2005 and held it until the okrug merged with Kamchatka Oblast on 30 June 2007.

On 16 October 2008 President Dmitry Medvedev appointed him to the Amur governorship to replace Nikolai Kolesov. On 14 October 2012, after direct elections of governors were restored, Kozhemyako ran for re-election. He was re-elected, collecting over 76% of the votes.

President Vladimir Putin appointed Kozhemyako to the governorship of Sakhalin Oblast on 25 March 2015 to replace Alexander Khoroshavin, who was arrested and charged with accepting bribes.

On 26 September 2018 Kozhemyako was appointed as the acting governor of Primorsky Krai. On 16 December 2018 he won the recall election for the governorship of Primorsky Krai.

In May 2022, Oleg Kozhemyako was included in the Myrotvorets Ukrainian database.

In October 2022, he was added to the Ukrainian sanctions list following the Russian invasion of Ukraine. In February 2023, the Office of Foreign Assets Control of the United States Department of the Treasury added Kozhemyako to the Specially Designated Nationals and Blocked Persons List. In February 2024, he was added to Australia's sanctions list. In May, he was sanctioned by the European Union due to weapons deliveries to North Korea.

In June 2023 he led a delegation to Belarus with the goal of negotiating the release of the Vladivostok-born political prisoner Sofia Sapega. President of Belarus Alexander Lukashenko later pardoned and released her from prison after serving a year.

== Hobbies ==
He is actively engaged in sports, including boxing, skiing, running, swimming, triathlon, and winter swimming, and even introduced Sakhalin officials to skiing. Since his tenure as governor of Amur Oblast, he has been a biker, riding a Harley-Davidson motorcycle, but due to sanctions he was forced to switch to an IZH motorcycle manufactured in Russia.

He is fond of dogs and, together with his family, breeds puppies. Two Siberian Huskies, Dina and Kayur, live at Oleg Kozhemyako’s country house.
