= Andrey Ishchenko =

- Андрей Ищенко
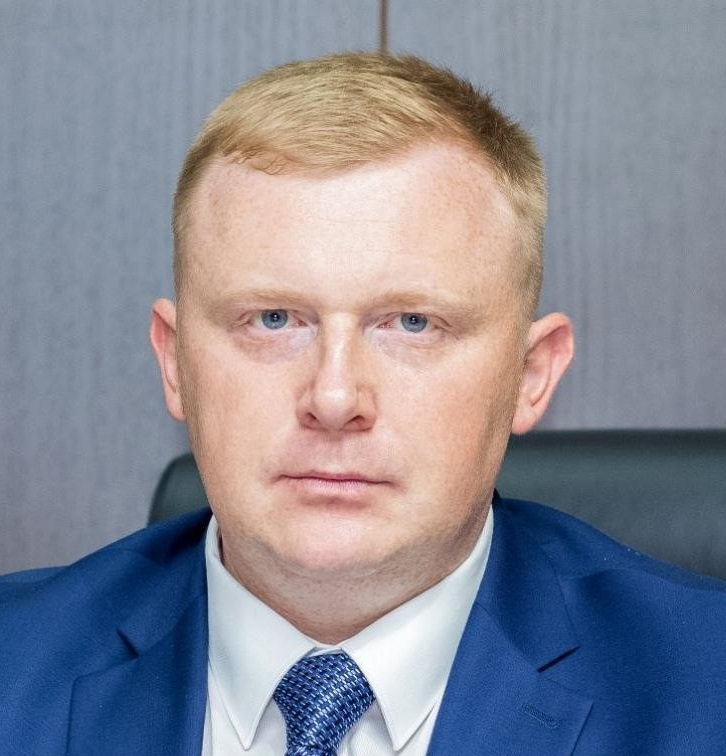
- Ishchenko in 2017

Member of Parliament in the Legislative Assembly of Primorsky Krai
- In office 5 October 2016 – 5 October 2021

Personal details
- Born: Andrey Sergeyevich Ischenko; 9 March 1981 (age 45) Lesozavodsk, Primorsky Krai, Russian SFSR, Soviet Union
- Party: Communist Party of the Russian Federation (suspended since 2019)
- Children: 2

Andrey Sergeyevich Ishchenko (Russian: Андрей Сергеевич Ищенко; born 9 March 1981) is a Russian politician who had served as a member of parliament in the Legislative Assembly of Primorsky Krai from 2016 to 2021.

== Biography ==
Andrey Ishchenko was born on 9 March 1981 in the city of Lesozavodsk, Primorsky Krai. From 1988 to 1997, he studied at the secondary school No. 74 of the city of Vladivostok. From 1997 to 1998, he was at the lyceum at the Far Eastern State Technical Fisheries University. In 1998, he entered that university. During the years of training, he was the commander of a platoon of cadets. He practiced on the sail training ship Pallada under the guidance of the sea captain Nikolai Zorchenko.

In 2004, he received a diploma of higher education with a degree in navigation engineer. He was awarded the military rank of lieutenant, military registration speciality, a commander of a mine-torpedo warhead, and combat use of anti-submarine and torpedo weapons of surface ships.

In 2005, he began his maritime career in the Far Eastern Shipping Company as a third mate. In five years of work, he rose to the position of chief mate.

In 2011, he began work in the construction industry of the Primorsky Krai as an assistant to the director of a construction enterprise Investment company Vostochnye Vorota under the leadership of the Honored Builder of the RSFSR, Honorary Builder of Russia - Ivan Bulenko.

In 2014, he headed the construction company Aurora-Story LLC, which is engaged in housing construction in the cities of Primorsky Krai.

On 18 September 2016, Ishchenko was elected a member of parliament, a deputy to the Legislative Assembly of Primorsky Krai of the sixth convocation in a single-mandate constituency number 1 - Vladivostok, part of the Pervomaisky district, gaining 24.66% of the votes of voters who came to the polling stations.

He is a former member of the Vladivostok Committee of the Communist Party of the Russian Federation, and secretary of the primary branch of Pervomaiskoye.

In an interview, Ishchenko said that as the head of the region, he was going to implement his program "20 steps" and was reforming the administration of the region. He promised to "continue the president's policy."

At the 2018 Russian elections, on 9 September 2018, Ishchenko took second place in the first round of the September 2018 Primorsky Krai gubernatorial election, gaining 24.63% of the vote. His opponent, Andrey Tarasenko, won 46.56% of the vote.

He reached the second round of voting, which took place on 16 September.

On 17 September 2018, Ishchenko did not agree with the results of the elections, went on a hunger strike and called on the residents of the region to go to the Square of Fighters for Soviet Power to hold a popular veche. The head of the Central Election Commission, Ella Pamfilova, said that the CEC will not sum up the results of the governor elections in Primorye until it understands the situation. Later, the election results were annulled, and Ishchenko went to court. On 28 December 2018, the Supreme Court of Russia dismissed the claim. The Communist Party of the Russian Federation did not nominate Ishchenko to run in the re-run, claiming that he won the governor's election, but that victory was stolen.

On 7 November 2018, Ishchenko announced on his social networks his decision to participate in the repeated December 2018 Primorsky Krai gubernatorial election on 16 December as a self-nominated candidate. Ishchenko's headquarters collected more than 15,000 signatures of the inhabitants of the region (submitted to the Regional Election Commission - 8,000 signatures) and the required number of signatures of municipal deputies of various levels (municipal filter). Registration as a candidate for governor was denied.

In the fall of 2021, Ishchenko was arrested on suspicion of fraud in the construction of a residential building on the funds of equity holders. The amount of damage by the prosecutor's office is estimated at 380 million rubles.

In October 2022, Ishchenko applied to the military commissariat with a request to send him to fight in Ukraine.

== Family ==
Ishchenko has a son and daughter.
