= Pavel Chikov =

Russian lawyer

- Павел Чиков
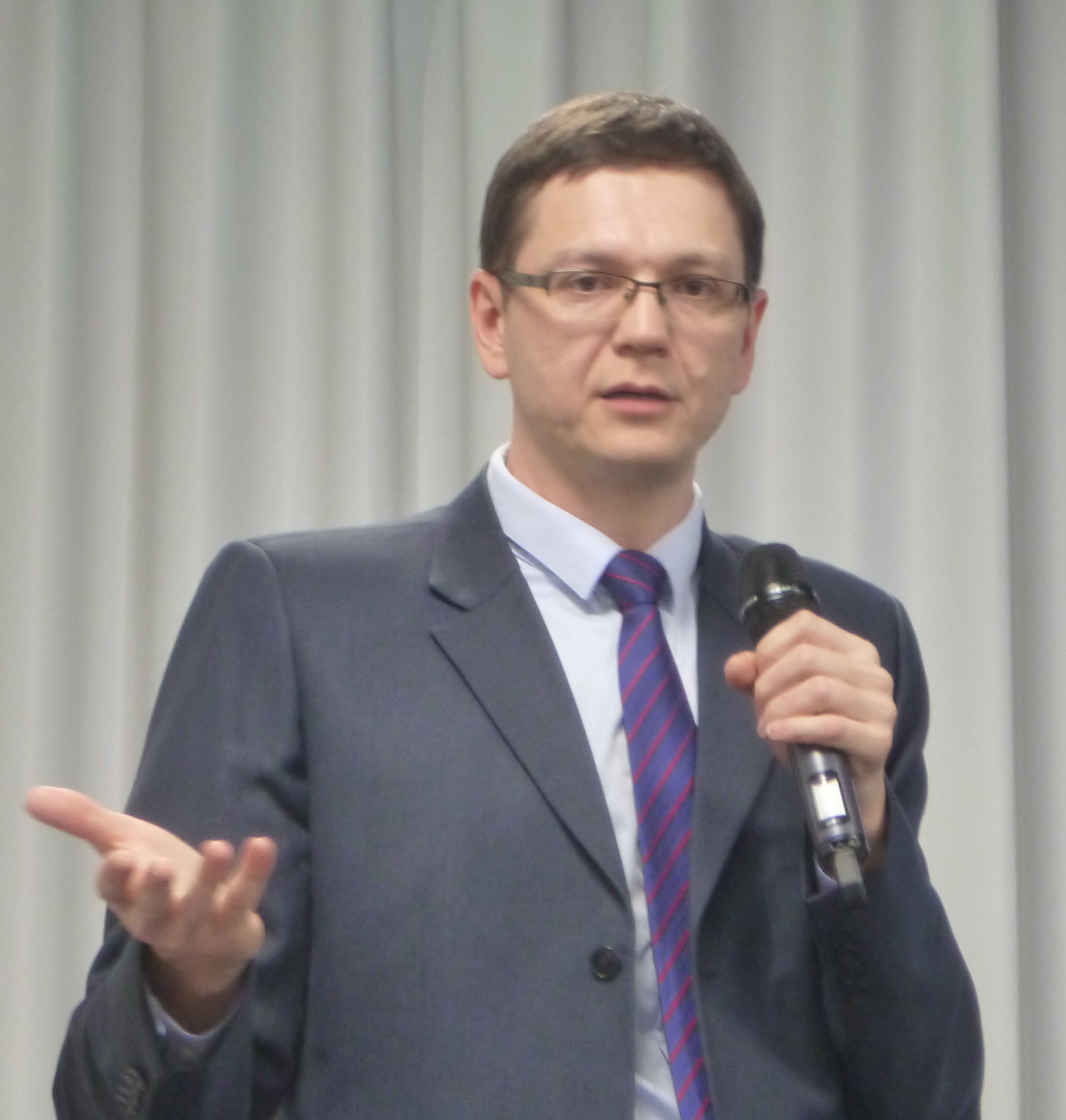
- Chikov in 2019
- Born: May 19, 1978 (age 48); Kazan, Russian SFSR, Soviet Union
- Occupations: Lawyer, human rights activist
- Awards: Thorolf Rafto Memorial Prize (2014)

Pavel Vladimirovich Chikov (Russian: Павел Владимирович Чиков; born May 19, 1978) is a Russian lawyer, human rights activist, and public figure. Chikov is the head of the Agora International Human Rights Group and a former member of the Presidential Council for Civil Society and Human Rights from 2012 to 2019.

== Biography ==
Chikov was born on May 19, 1978, in Kazan to a family of biologists. His mother is of Tatar origin, and his father is Russian.

In 2000, Chikov graduated with honors from the Faculty of Law of Kazan State University with a degree in International Law. During his university years, Chikov worked as an assistant investigator at the prosecutor's office. Then he got a position at the Committee for the Protection of Human Rights in the Republic of Tatarstan.

In 2001, Chikov launched the Kazan Human Rights Center. The same year, he temporarily moved to the United States to obtain a master's degree in Public Administration from the University of North Dakota.

In 2003, Chikov received Ph.D. in law at the Academy of Sciences of the Republic of Tatarstan with a dissertation on Military Sanctions in International Law.

In 2003, he headed the legal department of the Public Verdict Foundation in Moscow. He held this position until 2005. In 2003, Chikov also worked for Mikhail Khodorkovsky's Open Russia political party, where he set up a human rights department.

It was reported in May 2004 that a live grenade was thrown at the door of Chikov's apartment. The grenade failed to explode for technical reasons. Chikov connected the assassination attempt to his activities at the Kazan Human Rights Center. The police opened a criminal case regarding the grenade use, but the case remained unsolved.

In April 2005, Chikov headed the Interregional Office of the Agora Human Rights Organization. In 2015, he became the Head of the Agora International Human Rights Group and held this position until 2016, when Agora was closed by a court order.

In October 2019, Chikov was expelled from the Presidential Council for Civil Society and Human Rights for criticizing the government.

In October 2020, he nominated his candidacy for the position of judge at the European Court of Human Rights.

In March 2023, Russian Ministry of Justice added Pavel Chikov to its registry of foreign agents.

== Other ==
Chikov is also known as a human rights trainer for the Moscow Helsinki Group, an expert of the Human Rights Institute on human rights violations by law enforcement agencies and social control, and a member of the Russian Association of International Law.

Since 2001, he has taught at the Faculty of Law of the University of Management in Kazan. In addition, he was an associate professor at the Department of Constitutional and International Law.

Chikov is a co-author of reforming the Russian Interior Ministry, which was proposed for implementation in 2010 by the working group on Interior Ministry reform and voiced by the Russian Public Chamber.

Moreover, Chikov is a columnist for the Russian Forbes, RBK, Vedomosti, Republic.ru, and Novaya Gazeta.

== Awards ==
In 2014, Pavel Chikov and the Agora Human Rights Group were awarded the Thorolf Rafto Memorial Prize for defending human rights.

== Personal life ==
Chikov is married to Irina Khrunova, who defended one of Pussy Riot members, Yekaterina Samutsevich, in 2012. They have two children.
