= Roza Chemeris =

Russian politician (born 1978)

Roza Chemeris MP
- Роза Чемерис
- Chemeris in November 2026

Member of the State Duma (Party List Seat)
- Incumbent
- Assumed office 12 October 2021

Personal details
- Born: 11 June 1978 (age 48) Moscow, RSFSR, USSR
- Party: New People
- Spouses: Igor Chemeris; Gadzhimagomed Guseynov (divorced)
- Children: 3
- Parents: Mikhail Glubokovsky (stepfather); Elmira Glubokovskaya (mother)
- Education: Moscow State Institute of International Relations

Raziat (Roza) Basirovna Chemeris (Russian: Роза Басировна Чемерис; née Glubokovskaya; born 7 June 1978) is a Russian politician who was elected to the State Duma on the federal list for the New People party in 2021.

== Political career ==
Born on June 11, 1978, in Moscow (birth name: Raziyat Basirovna Gasanova). She is the daughter of Elmira Glubokovskaya, a deputy of the 5th State Duma of the Russian Federation from A Just Russia and of the 6th State Duma from United Russia. Her stepfather is Mikhail Glubokovsky, a former member of the 1st and 2nd State Dumas from the Yabloko party and a former senator of the Federation Council. Her husband is Igor Chemeris, a deputy of the Legislative Assembly of Primorsky Krai. Her former husband is Gadzhimagomed Guseynov, First Deputy Minister for the Development of the Russian Far East and Arctic. She has three sons.

Chemeris previously stood for election under the United Russia banner.

She is a candidate in the 2024 Khabarovsk Krai Legislative Duma election

=== Sanctions ===
On February 25, 2022, in the context of Russia’s invasion of Ukraine, she was included in the European Union sanctions list.

On March 11, 2022, she was added to the United Kingdom’s sanctions list.

On September 30, 2022, she was included in the United States sanctions list.

On February 24, 2023, she was sanctioned by Canada for being “involved in the ongoing violation of Ukraine’s sovereignty and territorial integrity by Russia”.

She is also subject to sanctions imposed by Switzerland, Australia, Japan, Ukraine, and New Zealand.

== Personal life ==
She is Avar by nationality. Her mother Elmira Glubokovskaya sat in the Duma from 2007 to 2016. Roza's father-in-law Mikhail Glubokovsky was also member of the Duma in 1993–1999.

== Income ==
In 2017, Vladivostok City Duma deputy Roza Chemeris earned 6,664,004 rubles. She owns a land plot of 600 square meters and a residential house of 401.3 square meters. She is also registered as the owner of three cars: a Mercedes GL500, a Mercedes GLS400 4Matic, and a BMW 750LI Xdrive.

== See also ==
- List of members of the 8th Russian State Duma
