= Government of the Sakha Republic =

Government of the Sakha Republic (Yakutia)
- Правительство Республики Саха (Якутия)

Overview
- Established: 1991
- State: Sakha Republic (Yakutia), Russia
- Website: prav.sakha.gov.ru

The Government of the Sakha Republic (Yakutia) under the purview of the Government of Russia exercises executive power and administrative control over the Sakha Republic (Yakutia). Members of government are Head of the Sakha Republic (Yakutia), Chairman of the Sakha Republic (Yakutia) and Cabinet Ministers. Its legal framework is governed both by the Constitution of the Sakha Republic (Yakutia) signed on April 2, 1992 and the Constitution of the Russian Federation.
