= Vladimir Miklushevsky =

Russian politician

- Владимир Миклушевский
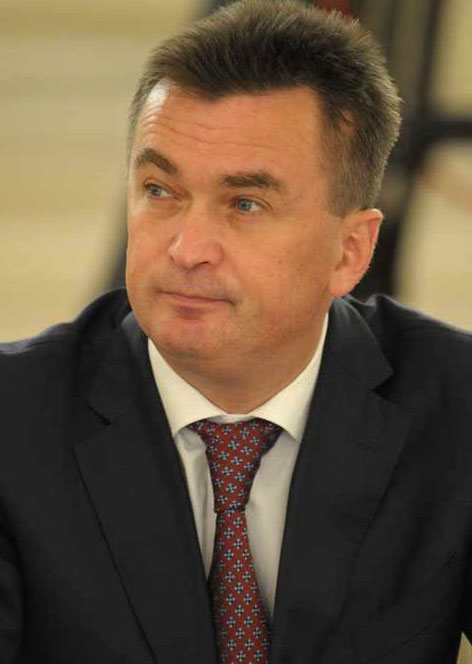
- Miklushevsky in 2014

4th Governor of Primorsky Krai
- In office 22 September 2014 – 22 September 2017
- Succeeded by: Andrey Tarasenko (acting)

Governor of Primorsky Krai (acting)
- In office 31 May 2014 – 22 September 2014

4th Governor of Primorsky Krai
- In office 16 March 2012 – 31 May 2014
- Preceded by: Sergey Darkin

Deputy Minister of Education and Science
- In office 1 September 2008 – 8 October 2010

Personal details
- Born: Vladimir Vladimirovich Miklushevsky; 15 September 1967 (age 58) Sverdlovsk, Soviet Union
- Party: United Russia

Vladimir Vladimirovich Miklushevsky (Russian: Владимир Владимирович Миклушевский; born on 15 September 1967) is a Russian politician who is currently rector at the Moscow Polytechnic University since 29 December 2017.

He had served as governor of Primorsky Krai from 16 March 2012 to 4 October 2017.

He is a member of the United Russia party. He is a doctor of Technical Sciences, author of more than 60 scientific papers.

== Biography ==
Vladimir Miklushevksy was born 15 September 1967 in Sverdlovsk.

In 1990, he graduated with honors from the Moscow Institute of Steel and Alloys with a degree in metallurgical engineering. From 1990 to 1993, he studied at the graduate school of MISiS, after which he began teaching at the Department of Rare Metals and Powder Metallurgy of MISiS.

In 1998, he was appointed head of the planning and economic department of MISiS. In 2004, he was a vice-rector for economics and finance. 3 years later, in April 2007, he became the first vice-rector of the Moscow Institute of Steel and Alloys.

In September 2007, he became the Director of the Department for Forecasting and Organization of the Budget Process of the Ministry of Education and Science of Russia, and on 1 September 2008, Miklushevsky became the Deputy Minister of Education and Science of Russia.

On 8 October 2010, by order of the Prime Minister of Russia Vladimir Putin, he was appointed rector of the Far Eastern Federal University.

On 28 February 2012, Miklushevsky was appointed acting governor of Primorsky Krai after the resignation of former governor Sergei Darkin.

At the first press conference as acting governor, Miklushevsky made several loud statements. He announced his intention to decriminalize the region, deal with all cases of corruption, dismiss inactive officials, as well as open a personal website for communication with residents of Primorye and start his own Twitter page.

The site was made very quickly, and on Twitter Miklushevsky unsubscribes almost daily, uploads photos from the scene. In such a simple way, the new governor became a notable newsmaker, and took the fifth place in the rating of citation of blogger governors. The governor's microblog is read with pleasure by Primorye residents, they write, without embarrassment in expressions, about everything that is happening in the region, they ask for help, they reproach for inaction. Miklushevsky answers everything, even the craziest, messages, asks, clarifies.

— Komsomolskaya Pravda

On 16 March 2012, at the suggestion of the President of the Russia, he was vested with the powers of the Governor of the Primorsky Krai. 34 out of 38 deputies voted for Miklushevsky.

In the first days of his work as governor of the Primorsky Krai, Miklushevsky changed the composition of the Regional Administration, namely the list of his deputies. It was decided to reduce the number of vice-governors from 10 to 8. Only four deputies from Darkin's team retained their posts, the rest were dismissed by Miklushevsky's order. Miklushevsky replaced a larger number of heads of municipalities, putting people loyal to him in their place, for which the popular elections of heads were canceled by amending the charters of municipalities.

In the first months of his reign, Miklushevsky proved himself to be a man of a democratic disposition. In the building of the regional administration, the "governor's elevator" was liquidated, which ran non-stop from the 1st to the 7th floor, where the office of the head of the region is located. The Public Chamber was created, against which Darkin opposed. He refused the special signal assigned to him by the Law, and the special number sequence. At the same time, he was repeatedly seen moving in a two-seat helicopter.

A special number series allocated for the Primorsky Krai Administration was introduced to “mark” employees of the regional administration on the road. But in view of the scandal that broke out in July 2012, when the driver of one of the vice-governors grossly violated traffic rules by driving into the oncoming lane, the series was canceled by personal order of the governor. The numbers were handed over to the ambulances of the region. The driver was fired at the direction of the governor.

From 28 July 2012 to 23 February 2013 and from 7 April to 10 November 2015, he was a Member of the Presidium of the State Council of Russia.

On 2 September 2012, speaking at the opening of a meeting of senior officials of the Asia-Pacific Economic Cooperation Forum (APEC) summit, he announced the need to create an “administrative offshore” in the region and gave instructions to his deputies about this. According to Miklushevsky, this will help resist corruption and increase the investment attractiveness of the region in the eyes of foreign business.

After the summit, Governor Miklushevsky appeared in a scandal involving volunteers who were promised a cruise to Japan on the Legend of the Seas liner by Putin for their work at the event, but officials and their relatives went to the Land of the Rising Sun instead. To the complaints of offended volunteers, Miklushevsky said that the time for issuing visas had already been lost, but nevertheless promised to encourage those volunteers in a different form who “did not get into tourist groups for objective reasons.” On 14 September 2012, the Russian Foreign Ministry explained that in the group of 508 people who arrived in Japan as part of the cruise promised by Putin, there were 460 volunteers who worked at the APEC summit.

From 30 June to 4 July 2014, the exhibition "The First Russian-Chinese EXPO" was held in Harbin, the positive result of which Miklushevsky proposed to repeat in Vladivostok in 2016, in order to develop infrastructure and housing construction in the region.

He was released from office ahead of schedule at his own request by Decree of the President of Russia on 4 October 2017.

On 28 December 2017, by order of the Russian Ministry of Education and Science No. 177 of 27 December 2017, he was appointed Acting Rector of the Moscow Polytechnic University.

== Family ==
He is married and has a son.
