= Andrey Tarasenko (politician) =

Russian statesman, Acting Governor of Primorsky Krai (2017-2018)

- Андрей Тарасенко
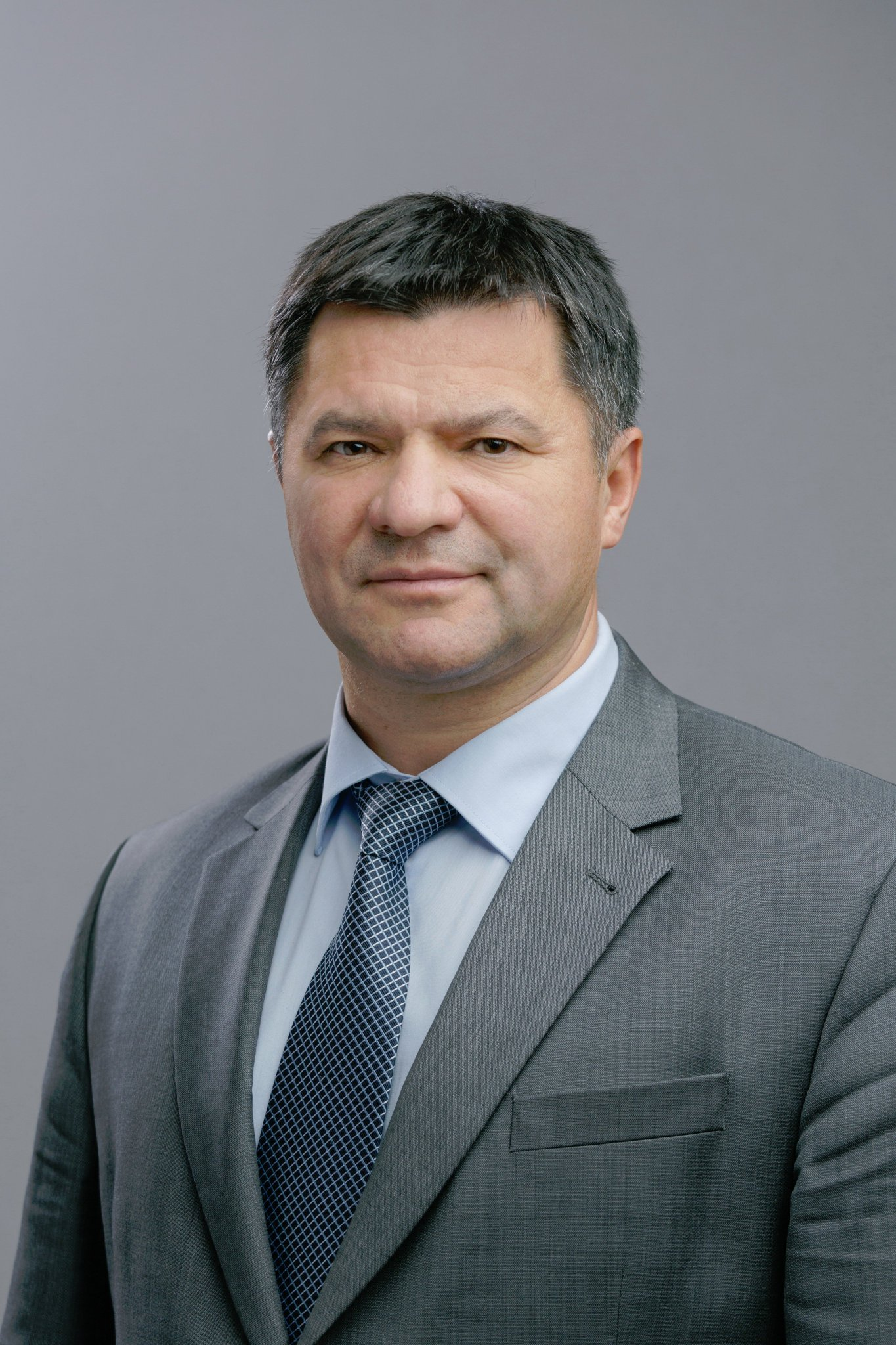
- Tarasenko in 2020

Head of the Federal Agency for Maritime and River Transport
- Incumbent
- Assumed office 29 March 2024
- Preceded by: Zakharry Dhyozyev

Chairman of the Government of Yakutia
- In office 31 July 2020 – 3 October 2023
- Preceded by: Aleksey Kolodeznikov (acting)
- Succeeded by: Kirill Bychkov

Deputy Head of the Federal Agency for Maritime and River Transport
- In office 27 September 2018 – 31 July 2020

Governor of Primorsky Krai (acting)
- In office 4 October 2017 – 26 September 2018
- Preceded by: Vladimir Miklushevsky
- Succeeded by: Oleg Kozhemyako
- In office 4 October 2017 – 26 September 2018
- Preceded by: Vladimir Miklushevsky
- Succeeded by: Oleg Kozhemyako

Personal details
- Born: Andrey Vladimirovich Tarasenko; 9 August 1963 (age 62) Vladivostok, Soviet Union
- Party: United Russia

Andrey Vladimirovich Tarasenko (Russian: Андрей Владимирович Тарасенко; born on 9 August 1963) is a Russian politician and former army officer who had served as the Chairman of the Government of the Republic of Sakha (Yakutia) from 2020 to 2023.

Tarasenko had served as the acting governor of Primorsky Krai from 2017 to 2018, before he was officially replaced by Oleg Kozhemyako. He was also the Deputy Head of the Federal Agency for Maritime and River Transport from 2018 to 2020. He is also a doctor of psychology.

== Early life and career ==
Andrey Tarasenko was born in Vladivostok on 9 August 1963. He began working in 1980. In 1985, he graduated from the Higher Naval School of Submarine Navigation in Leningrad. Until 1994, he served in the Soviet Army and the Russian Armed Forces.

From September 1997 to January 2000 Tarasenko worked as a manager of the closed joint stock company Westmoreproduct. Between January 2000 and November 2003, he was the Acting General Director, then General Director of the Federal State Unitary Enterprise National Fish Resources. In 2002, he graduated from the Russian Academy of Public Administration under the President of Russia with a degree in State and Municipal Administration with the qualification of a Manager. In 2003, he defended his Ph.D. thesis at the Moscow State Social University on the topic "Dialogue model of managerial decision-making by a manager."

From January 2004 to June 2005, Tarasenko was acting director of the Federal State Unitary Enterprise "Murmansk Sea Fishing Port". Between July 2005 and June 2007, he became the Deputy Head of the Inspectorate for Controlling Federal Budget Expenditures on Fisheries and Water Resources of the Department for Controlling Federal Budget Expenditures on Natural Resources and Agroindustrial Complex of the Accounts Chamber of Russia. In 2006, he graduated from the Russian State Social University with a degree in accounting, analysis and audit with the qualification of an economist. From June to August 2007, he worked as First Deputy Director of the Federal State Unitary Enterprise "State Order of the Red Banner of Labor Research Institute of Chemical Reagents and Highly Pure Chemical Substances." From December 2007 to April 2008, he was the Deputy Head of the Department of Affairs and Administrative Support of the Federal Agency for Atomic Energy. Between April 2008 and February 2010, he worked as Deputy Director of the Department for Management of Affairs and Property Complex of the State Atomic Energy Corporation Rosatom.

In 2009, he was awarded the academic title of Professor in the Department of Acmeology and Cybernetics of the Peter the Great Military Academy of the Strategic Missile Forces. In 2010, Tarasenko was awarded the academic degree of Doctor of Psychology. According to the results of the examination of the Dissernet network community, most of Tarasenko's doctoral dissertation "Socio-psychological patterns and mechanisms of optimal activity of a military leader" is plagiarism: the text of 280 out of 340 analyzed pages is fully or partially borrowed from the dissertation defended in 1995 L. G. Lapteva "Optimization of the administrative activities of military personnel.".

From December 2010 to January 2012, he successively held positions, starting from chief economist to advisor to the deputy chairman of the board of JSC Russian Agricultural Bank. From March 2012 to June 2013, he consecutively held the positions of Deputy Head, Head of the Nevsko-Ladoga Basin Water Administration of the Federal Agency for Water Resources. From July to September 2013, he held the position of Deputy General Director of FSUE "Rosmorport". On 11 September 2013, he was promoted to the General Director of FSUE “Rosmorport”.

== Politics ==
On 4 October 2017, Russian President Vladimir Putin appointed Tarasenko as interim governor of the Primorsky Krai to replace the retired Vladimir Miklushevsky. Tarasenko publicly supported the pension reform which was unpopular among the people.

On a single voting day on 9 September 2018, in the first round of elections for the governor of the Primorsky Krai, he received 46.57% of the votes and entered the second round with the member of the Legislative Assembly of the Primorsky Krai, Andrey Ishchenko, of the Communist Party of the Russian Federation. On 11 September, President Putin met with Tarasenko, who expressed the hope that in the second round of elections "everything will be all right" for him.

The second round took place on 16 September. After processing 96% of the ballots, Tarasenko was trailing about five percent behind the candidate from the Communist Party, Ischenko, but at the last moment he unexpectedly took the lead. The second round was accompanied by numerous violations, protests and accusations of both candidates against each other. After considering numerous complaints, on 19 September, the chairman of the Central Election Commission, Ella Pamfilova, recommended the regional commission to invalidate the election of the governor, which was done the next day. Shortly thereafter, Tarasenko wrote a letter of resignation from the position of acting governor of the Primorsky Krai, which Putin approved on 26 September 2018, and Oleg Kozhemyako was appointed acting governor of the Primorsky Krai, and was eventually officially elected as the governor.

By order of the Government of the Russian Federation dated 27 September 2018, Tarasenko was appointed Deputy Head of the Federal Agency for Maritime and River Transport. Since 31 July 2020, Tarasenko has served as the chairman of the government of the Republic of Sakha (Yakutia).
