= Legislative Assembly of Primorsky Krai =

Regional parliament of Primorsky Krai, Russia

Legislative Assembly of Primorsky Krai Законодательное собрание Приморского края
- 7th legislature

Type
- Type: Unicameral

Leadership
- Chairman: Aleksandr Rolik, United Russia since 5 October 2016

Structure
- Seats: 40
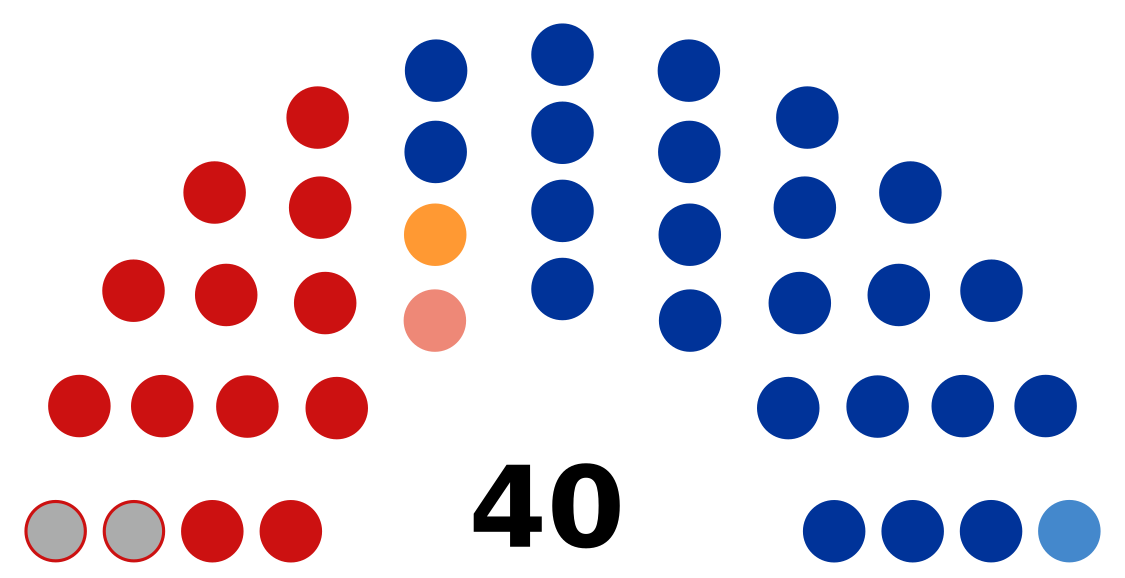
- Political groups: United Russia (23) CPRF (14); LDPR (1); SRZP (1) RPPSJ (1)

Elections
- Voting system: Mixed
- Last election: 19 September 2021
- Next election: 2026

Meeting place
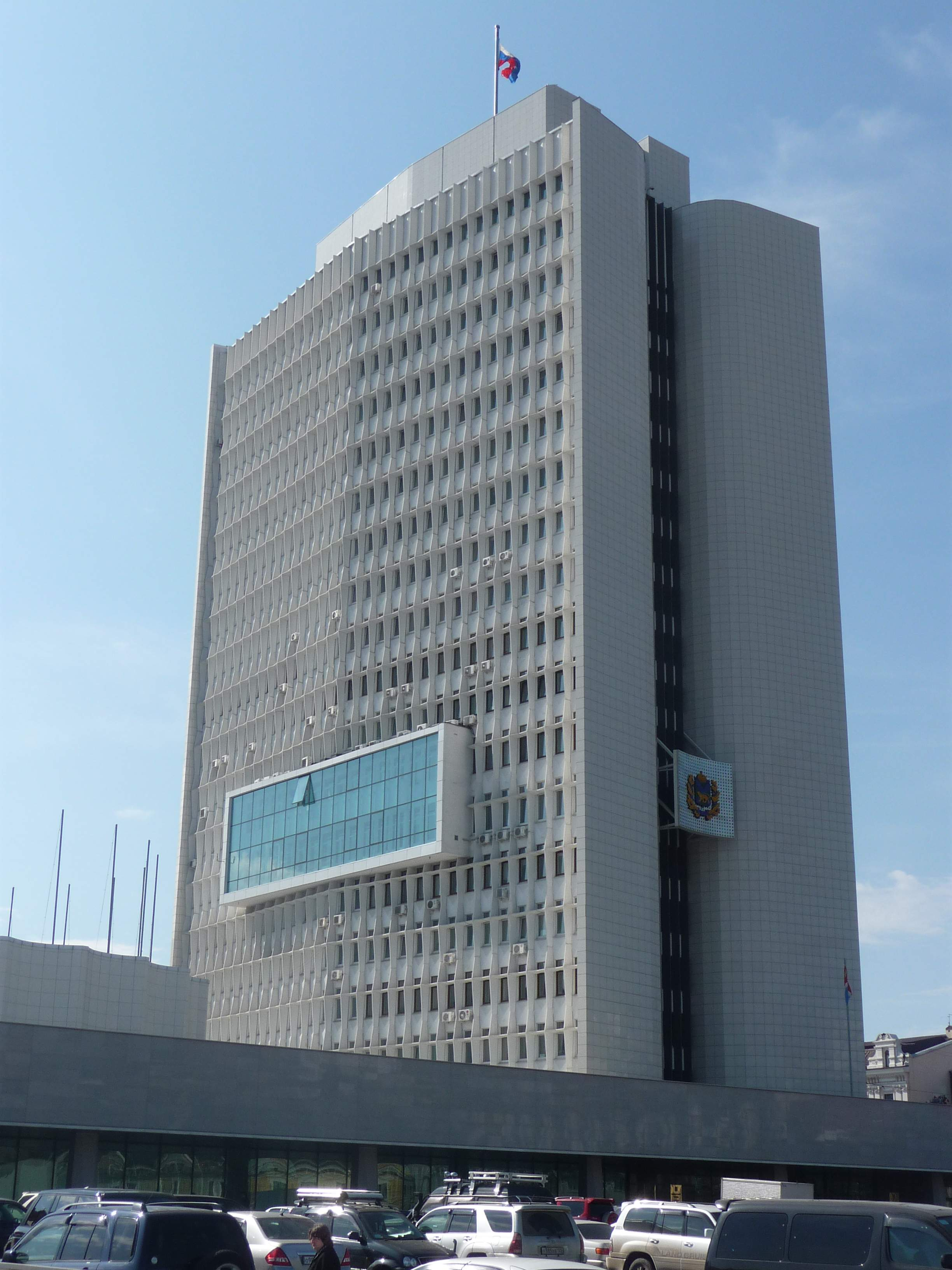
- 22 Svetlanskaya Street, Vladivostok

Website
- www.zspk.gov.ru

The Legislative Assembly of Primorsky Krai (Russian: Законодательное собрание Приморского края) is the regional parliament of Primorsky Krai, a federal subject of Russia. A total of 40 deputies are elected for five-year terms.

The assembly exercises its authority by passing laws, resolutions, and other legal acts and by supervising the implementation and observance of the laws and other legal acts passed by it.

== Elections ==
=== 2021 ===
Party	%	Seats
United Russia	37.88	23
Communist Party of the Russian Federation	31.02	14
A Just Russia — For Truth	9.29	1
Liberal Democratic Party of Russia	9.03	1
Russian Party of Pensioners for Social Justice	8.40	1
Registered voters/turnout	41.96	

== List of chairmen ==
Name	Took/left office
Igor Lebedynets	January 1995 - June 1995
Vladimir Vedernikov	1995 - 1996
?	1996 - 1997
Sergey Dudnik	1997 - 2000
Sergey Zhekov	2000 - 2002
Sergey Sopchuk	2002 - 2006
Viktor Gorchakov	2006 - 2011
Yevgeny Ovechkin	2011 - 2012
Viktor Gorchakov	2012 - 2016
Aleksandr Rolik	2016 - present
