= 2025 Irkutsk Oblast gubernatorial election =

- 12–14 September 2025
- Turnout: 33.06% ▲0.45 pp
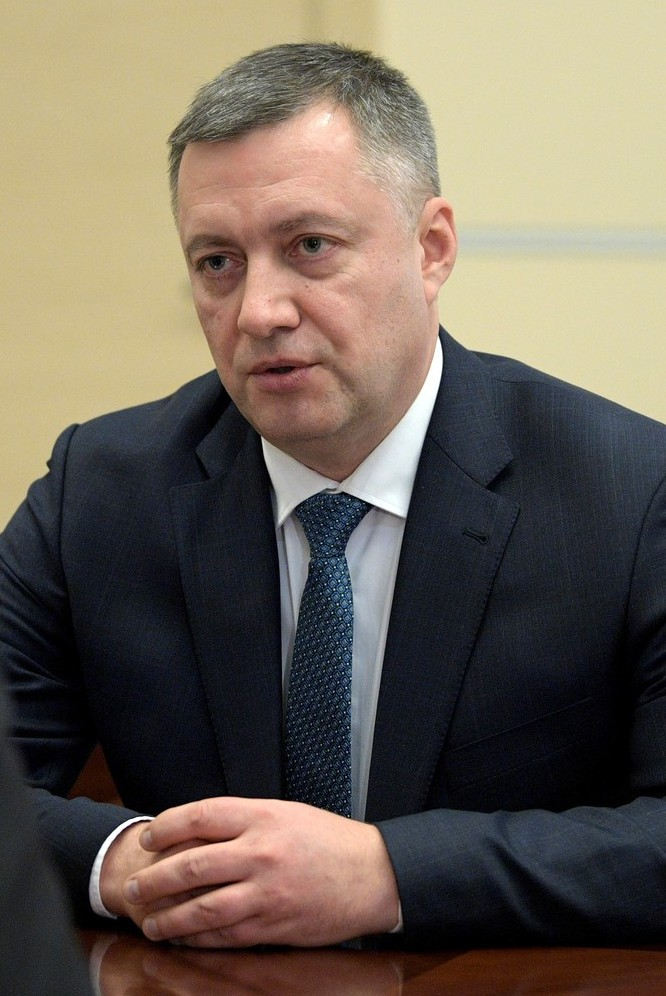

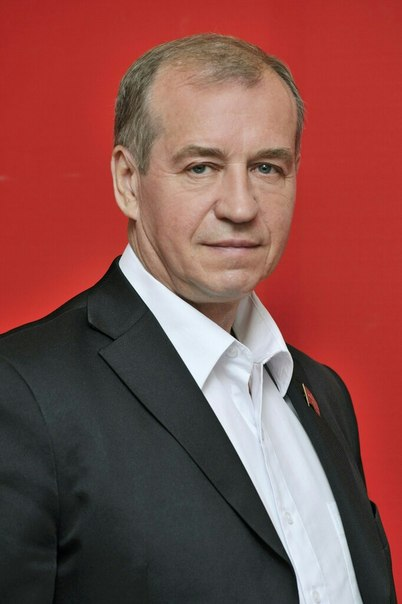
Candidate	Igor Kobzev	Sergey Levchenko
Party	United Russia	CPRF
Popular vote	367,064	136,760
Percentage	60.79%	22.65%
	SR–ZP	LDPR
Candidate	Larisa Yegorova	Viktor Galitskov
Party	SR–ZP	LDPR
Popular vote	48,774	35,121
Percentage	8.08%	5.82%
- Election results by district: Igor Kobzev Sergey Levchenko
Governor before election
Igor Kobzev
United Russia
Governor-elect
Igor Kobzev
United Russia

The 2025 Irkutsk Oblast gubernatorial election took place on 12–14 September 2025, on common election day. The incumbent governor of Irkutsk Oblast, Igor Kobzev, was re-elected to a second term in office.

== Background ==
Then-Deputy Minister of Emergency Situations Igor Kobzev was appointed acting governor of Irkutsk Oblast in December 2019, replacing first-term Communist incumbent Sergey Levchenko. Levchenko resigned over poor relations with federal authorities and lack of response to deadly floods in southern Irkutsk Oblast. Former governor Levchenko initially was looking into challenging Kobzev in the 2020 election, however, regional electoral commission ruled that Levchenko is barred that election as it was caused by his resignation. Kobzev ran for a full term as an independent with the support from United Russia and won the election with 60.79% of the vote, defeating Communist State Duma member Mikhail Shchapov by 35 points. In 2021 Kobzev agreed to lead United Russia for the upcoming Russian legislative election in Irkutsk Oblast, and in November 2021 he officially joined the party.

Kobzev's term as governor was noted by numerous conflicts between the governor and both local and federal elites as well as by a significant drop in Kobzev's own ratings. One of such conflicts spilled out in 2024 in the Bratsk mayoral election between Kobzev who endorsed incumbent mayor Sergey Serebrennikov, while Senator Andrey Chernyshev endorsed his victorious challenger Aleksandr Dubrovin. Kobzev also allegedly damaged relations with billionaire Oleg Deripaska, who owns Irkutsk Oblast enterprises Irkutskenergo, Bratsk and Irkutsk aluminium plants, and Rostec general director Sergey Chemezov, an Irkutsk native. Sources allege Deripaska could endorse Senator Chernyshev against Kobzev, Chemezov is seen close to Legislative Assembly of Irkutsk Oblast speaker Aleksandr Vedernikov, while major local construction tycoons could lend support to former governor Sergey Levchenko.

In February 2025 during a meeting with President Vladimir Putin Governor Kobzev announced his intention to run for a second term and received Putin's endorsement.

== Candidates ==
In Irkutsk Oblast candidates for Governor of Irkutsk Oblast can be nominated by registered political parties or by self-nomination. Candidate for Governor of Irkutsk Oblast should be a Russian citizen and at least 30 years old. Candidates for Governor of Irkutsk Oblast should not have a foreign citizenship or residence permit. Each candidate in order to be registered is required to collect at least 5% of signatures of members and heads of municipalities. In addition, self-nominated candidates should collect 0.5% of signatures of Irkutsk Oblast residents. Also gubernatorial candidates present 3 candidacies to the Federation Council and election winner later appoints one of the presented candidates.

=== Declared ===
Candidate name, political party		Occupation	Status	Ref.
Viktor Galitskov; Liberal Democratic Party		First Deputy Mayor of Ushakovo Municipality (2023–present); Former Deputy Chairman of the Government of Irkutsk Oblast (2020–2021)	Registered	
Igor Kobzev; United Russia	Igor Kobzev	Incumbent Governor of Irkutsk Oblast (2019–present)	Registered	
Sergey Levchenko; Communist Party	Sergey Levchenko	Member of State Duma (2000–2003, 2007–2015, 2021–present); Former Governor of Irkutsk Oblast (2015–2019)	Registered	
Larisa Yegorova; SR–ZP		Member of Legislative Assembly of Irkutsk Oblast (2018–present); Former Deputy Chairwoman of the Legislative Assembly (2018–2023); 2015 and 2020 gubernatorial candidate	Registered	
Sergey Gagarkin; Independent		2020 gubernatorial candidate	Did not file	
Aleksandr Pleskach; Independent		Homeowner; 2020 gubernatorial candidate	Did not file	

=== Eliminated in the primary ===
- Yulia Akishina (United Russia), community activist
- Aleksandr Khlivitsky (United Russia), Mayor of Khrebtovaya (2024–present)
- Aleksey Savelyev (United Russia), Member of Duma of Irkutsk (2009–present), chief energy engineer at the Irkutsk Aviation Plant

=== Declined ===
- Sardana Avksentyeva (New People), Member of State Duma (2021–present)
- Andrey Chernyshev, Senator from Irkutsk Oblast (2020–present)
- Yevgeny Sarsenbayev (CPRF), Member of Legislative Assembly of Irkutsk Oblast (2018–present)
- Andrey Dukhovnikov (LDPR), Member of Legislative Assembly of Irkutsk Oblast (2023–present), 2020 gubernatorial candidate
- Sergey Serebrennikov, former Mayor of Bratsk (2005–2010, 2014–2024)
- Mikhail Shchapov (CPRF), Member of State Duma (2016–present), 2020 gubernatorial candidate
- Aleksandr Vedernikov, Chairman of the Legislative Assembly of Irkutsk Oblast (2020–present)

=== Candidates for Federation Council ===
Head candidate, political party	Candidates for Federation Council	Status
Igor Kobzev; United Russia	* Kuzma Aldarov, First Deputy Chairman of the Legislative Assembly of Irkutsk Oblast (2023–present), Member of the Legislative Assembly (2013–present) * Andrey Chernyshev, incumbent Senator (2020–present) * Natalya Dikusarova, Deputy Chairwoman of the Legislative Assembly of Irkutsk Oblast (2023–present), Member of the Legislative Assembly (2008–present)	Registered
Sergey Levchenko; Communist Party	* Vyacheslav Markhayev, Member of State Duma (2011–2015, 2021–present), former Senator (2015–2020) * Olga Nosenko, former Deputy Chairwoman of the Legislative Assembly of Irkutsk Oblast (2018–2023), former Member of the Legislative Assembly (2013–2023) * Ilya Sumarokov, former Member of Legislative Assembly of Irkutsk Oblast (2004–2023), former People's Deputy of the Soviet Union (1989–1991), agribusinessman	Registered

== Finances ==
All sums are in rubles.

Financial Report	Source	Gagarkin	Galitskov	Kobzev	Levchenko	Yegorova
Final		0	4,235,000	52,357,254	7,595,600	3,907,966

== Polls ==
Fieldwork date	Polling firm	Kobzev	Levchenko	Yegorova	Galitskov	None	Lead
14 September 2025	2025 election	60.8	22.7	8.1	5.8	2.7	38.1
5–19 August 2025	WCIOM	71.8	18.3	4.0	3.7	2.2	53.5

== Results ==
Summary of the 12–14 September 2025 Irkutsk Oblast gubernatorial election results
Candidate	Party	Votes	%
Igor Kobzev (incumbent)	United Russia	367,064	60.79
Sergey Levchenko	Communist Party	136,760	22.65
Larisa Yegorova	A Just Russia – For Truth	48,774	8.08
Viktor Galitskov	Liberal Democratic Party	35,121	5.82
Valid votes		587,719	97.33
Blank ballots		16,097	2.67
Total		603,817	100.00
Turnout		603,817	33.06
Registered voters		1,826,229	100.00

Governor Kobzev re-appointed incumbent Senator Andrey Chernyshev (United Russia) to the Federation Council.

== See also ==
- 2025 Russian regional elections
