= 2001 Russian gubernatorial elections =

- 14 January – 23 December 2001

17 Heads of Federal Subjects from 89
- 2001 Russian regional elections: Gubernatorial Gubernatorial (of another subject) Legislative Legislative (of another subject) Legislative (including one of another subject) Gubernatorial and legislative Gubernatorial and legislative (both of another subject) Referendum

Gubernatorial elections in 2001 took place in 17 regions of the Russian Federation on various dates, including one snap election. In two regions the second rounds were held in January 2002.

With some delay, elections were held for the governors of Nenets and Taymyr Autonomous Okrugs, whose terms of office expired back in December 2000. Early elections were held in Primorsky Krai after resignation of Yevgeny Nazdratenko.

On 1 December 2001 Fatherland – All Russia party (OVR), founded and supported by a number of influential governors, officially merged with pro-Putin Unity into United Russia. For the some time after it was known as "Unity and Fatherland — United Russia". Previously that year members of these two center-right parties had occasionally met each other in different gubernatorial races.

== Race summary ==
Federal subject	Incumbent	Incumbent since	Election day	Candidates	Result
Tyumen Oblast	Leonid Roketsky	1993	14 January	✓ Sergey Sobyanin (Unity) 52.78%; Leonid Roketsky 28.90%; Aleksandr Cherepanov (RKRP) 7.41%; Against all 5.26%	Incumbent lost re-election. New governor elected.
Nenets AO	Vladimir Butov	1996	14 January	✓ Vladimir Butov (Unity) 68.28%; Aleksandr Shmakov 13.60%; Vyacheslav Vyucheysky 4.62%	Incumbent re-elected.
Taymyr AO	Gennady Nedelin	1991	28 January	✓ Alexander Khloponin 62.80%; Gennady Nedelin 32.38%	Incumbent lost re-election. New governor elected.
Tatarstan	Mintimer Shaymiyev	1991	25 March	✓ Mintimer Shaymiyev (OVR) 79.52%; Sergey Shashurin 5.78%; Ivan Grachev 5.47%	Incumbent re-elected.
Amur Oblast	Anatoly Belonogov	1997	25 March (first round)	Anatoly Belonogov (CPRF) 43.90%; Leonid Korotkov 20.60%; Yury Bobylyov 10.86%; Pavel Stein 7.98%; Vladimir Voshchevoz 7.37%; Viktor Labushev 5.37%; Against all 10.29%	Incumbent lost re-election. New governor elected.
Amur Oblast	Anatoly Belonogov	1997	8 April (runoff)	✓ Leonid Korotkov 49.42%; Anatoly Belonogov (CPRF) 42.86%; Against all 7.72%	Incumbent lost re-election. New governor elected.
Tula Oblast	Vasily Starodubtsev	1997	8 April (first round)	Vasily Starodubtsev (CPRF–APR) 49.09%; Andrey Samoshin 20.96%; Viktor Sokolovsky 18.62%; Against all 8.00%	Incumbent re-elected.
Tula Oblast	Vasily Starodubtsev	1997	22 April (runoff)	✓ Vasily Starodubtsev (CPRF–APR) 71.44%; Viktor Sokolovsky (Note: Replacing Andrey Samoshin.) 17.16%; Against all 9.89%	Incumbent re-elected.
Evenk AO	Aleksandr Bokovikov	1997	8 April	✓ Boris Zolotaryov 51.08%; Yevgeny Vasilyev 35.29%	Incumbent did not stand for re-election. New governor elected.
Kemerovo Oblast (snap election)	Aman Tuleyev (resigned); Valentin Mazikin (acting)	1997	22 April	✓ Aman Tuleyev (Unity, Fatherland) 93.54%; Sergey Neverov 0.71%; Against all 3.23%	Former governor re-elected.
Primorsky Krai (snap election)	Yevgeny Nazdratenko (resigned); Konstantin Tolstoshein (acting)	1993	27 May (first round)	Sergey Darkin 23.94%; Viktor Cherepkov 20.02%; Gennady Apanasenko 14.12%; Vladimir Grishukov (CPRF) 9.81%; Valentin Dubinin 7.87%; Aleksandr Kirilichev 6.94%; Against all 8.04%	New governor elected to a vacant position.
Primorsky Krai (snap election)	Yevgeny Nazdratenko (resigned); Konstantin Tolstoshein (acting)	1993	17 June (runoff)	✓ Sergey Darkin 40.17%; Gennady Apanasenko 24.28% (Note: Replacing Viktor Cherepkov.); Against all 33.71%	New governor elected to a vacant position.
Nizhny Novgorod Oblast	Ivan Sklyarov	1997	15 July (first round)	Gennady Khodyrev (CPRF) 24.44%; Ivan Sklyarov (OVR) 20.82%; Vadim Bulavinov 19.07%; Dmitry Savelyev (SPS) 12.58%; Andrey Klimentyev 10.54%; Against all 8.17%	Incumbent lost re-election. New governor elected.
Nizhny Novgorod Oblast	Ivan Sklyarov	1997	29 July (runoff)	✓ Gennady Khodyrev (CPRF) 59.80%; Ivan Sklyarov (OVR) 28.25%; Against all 10.42%	Incumbent lost re-election. New governor elected.
Irkutsk Oblast	Boris Govorin	1997	29 July (first round)	Boris Govorin 45.05%; Sergey Levchenko (CPRF) 23.93%; Valentin Mezhevich 12.20%; Against all 7.46%	Incumbent re-elected.
Irkutsk Oblast	Boris Govorin	1997	19 August (runoff)	✓ Boris Govorin 47.63%; Sergey Levchenko (CPRF) 45.26%; Against all 5.57%	Incumbent re-elected.
Rostov Oblast	Vladimir Chub	1991	23 September	✓ Vladimir Chub 78.23%; Pyotr Voloshin 7.21%; Against all 12.68%	Incumbent re-elected.
Oryol Oblast	Yegor Stroyev	1993	28 October	✓ Yegor Stroyev 91.52%; Vladimir Zyabkin 1.60%; Against all 3.83%	Incumbent re-elected.
Altai Republic	Semyon Zubakin	1997	16 December (first round)	Mikhail Lapshin (APR) 22.96%; Semyon Zubakin (SPS) 15.20%; Vladimir Petrov 14.11%; Sergey Krechetov 13.24%; Viktor Romashkin (CPRF) 11.97%; Alexander Berdnikov (UR) 9.67%; Vladimir Amurgushev 5.97%	Incumbent lost re-election. New head elected.
Altai Republic	Semyon Zubakin	1997	6 January 2002 (runoff)	✓ Mikhail Lapshin (APR) 68.15%; Semyon Zubakin (SPS) 22.96%; Against all 6.64%	Incumbent lost re-election. New head elected.
Komi	Yury Spiridonov	1994	16 December	✓ Vladimir Torlopov 39.75%; Yury Spiridonov 34.92%; Leonid Musinov (CPRF) 6.23%; Against all 9.64%	Incumbent lost re-election. New head elected.
Chuvashia	Nikolay Fyodorov	1993	16 December	✓ Nikolay Fyodorov 40.73%; Valentin Shurchanov (CPRF) 37.73%; Stanislav Voronov 11.95%	Incumbent re-elected.
Yakutia	Mikhail Nikolayev	1991	23 December (first round)	Vyacheslav Shtyrov 45.54%; Fedot Tumusov 17.00%; Ruslan Shipkov 15.83%; Vasily Filippov 8.00%; Against all 7.71%	Incumbent term-limited. New president elected.
Yakutia	Mikhail Nikolayev	1991	13 January 2002 (runoff)	✓ Vyacheslav Shtyrov 59.25%; Fedot Tumusov 34.59%	Incumbent term-limited. New president elected.
