= Valentin Dubinin =

- Валентин Дубинин

Acting Governor of Primorsky Krai
- In office 9 February 2001 – 27 April 2001
- Preceded by: Yevgeny Nazdratenko
- Succeeded by: Igor Belchuk (acting); Konstantin Tolstoshein (acting); Sergey Darkin

Personal details
- Born: 15 January 1946 (age 79); Spasskoye, Primorsky Krai, RSFSR, Soviet Union

Valentin Stepanovich Dubinin (Russian: Валенти́н Степа́нович Дуби́нин; born January 15, 1946) is a deputy of the Legislative Assembly of Primorsky Krai, Russia, and the krai's former acting governor.

In 1969, Dubinin graduated from Ussuriysk Agricultural Institute, where he specialized in Agricultural Mechanical Engineering, and in 1982—from the Khabarovsk higher party school. His work career started in 1969 in Chernigovka, Primorsky Krai, where he was a director of a creamery in 1970–1971. In the following twenty years he held various Communist party posts in Chernigovsky District administration. He became the head of Anuchinsky District administration in 1991; a post that he held until 1993. In 1993–1995, he served as the first deputy chair of Primorsky Krai administration; after that—as a vice-governor to Governor Yevgeny Nazdratenko.

On February 9, 2001, following Nazdratenko's resignation, Dubinin became acting governor of Primorsky Krai. He was one of the candidates for the governor's seat in May 2001 elections, but did not receive enough votes to make it to the second round, losing to Viktor Cherepkov and Sergey Darkin (who eventually won the election). After having lost the elections, Dubinin was offered and accepted the job at Alfa-Bank, the Far Eastern regional division of which he currently heads.

On October 8, 2006, he was elected a deputy of the Legislative Assembly of Primorsky Krai as a candidate of the United Russia party.

Valentin Dubinin has two sons. His hobbies include spending time at his dacha in Anuchino, where he grows vegetables.
