= Governor of Irkutsk Oblast =

Highest-ranking official in Irkutsk Oblast, Russia

- Губернатор Иркутской области
- Coat of Arms of Irkutsk Oblast

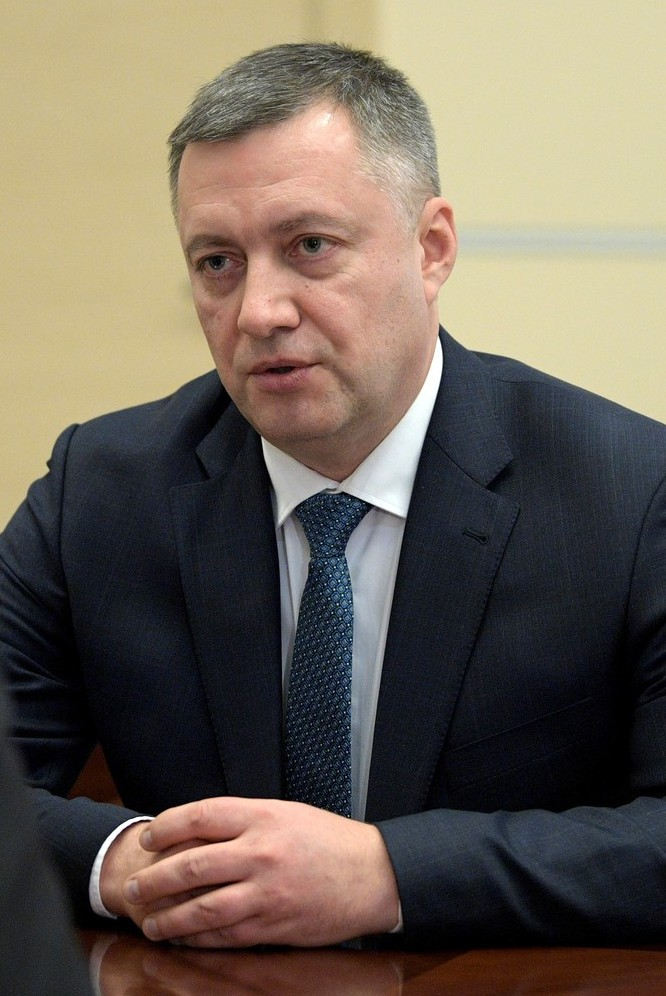
- Incumbent; Igor Kobzev since 18 September 2020
- Style: His Excellency
- Seat: Irkutsk
- Appointer: Popular vote
- Term length: 5 years
- Formation: 1991
- First holder: Yury Nozhikov
- Website: irkobl.ru

The Governor of Irkutsk Oblast (Russian: Губернатор Иркутской области) is the highest official of Irkutsk Oblast. The office of governor of Irkutsk Governorate was established in 1783 as part of the Russian Empire. In 1926, under the Soviet Union, the governorate became part of the newly created Siberian Krai, which lasted until its division in 1930 into East and West Siberian Krais. The area of the former Irkutsk Governorate became part of the East Siberian Krai. In 1936 East Siberian Krai was further divided up, and in 1937 the remaining area was split into Chita Oblast and Irkutsk Oblast. Since then Irkutsk Oblast has been an independent federal subject of Russia.

== Powers and responsibilities ==
- Promote or rejects the laws passed by the Irkutsk Oblast Duma.
- Submits a reports on the execution of regional budget to the Oblast Duma.
- Submits the draft strategies for the socio-economic development of the oblast and an annual report on the implementation and effectiveness of the state programs of Irkutsk Oblast.
- Attends the meetings of Oblast Duma and submits annual reports on the activity of the Government of Irkutsk Oblast, including the issues raised by the members of Oblast Duma.
- Decides on early termination of the Irkutsk Oblast Duma.
- Determines the structure of state powers of the Irkutsk Oblast in accordance with the charter of Irkutsk Oblast.
- With the coordination with Oblast Duma; He appoints the First Deputy Governor of Irkutsk Province.
- Can dismiss the First Deputy Governor of Irkutsk Oblast.
- Forms the government of Irkutsk Oblast and appoints the Chairman of the Government, First Deputy Chairman of the Government, and the government ministers of Irkutsk Oblast and can also dismissed them.
- Determines the main activities of the Government of Irkutsk Oblast.
- Had a right to call an emergency session of the Irkutsk Oblast Duma.
- Decides the dismissal of the Government of Irkutsk Oblast.
- Appoints a representative of the Government of Irkutsk Oblast to the Federation Council.
- Appoints the position of the Commissioner for the Protection of the Rights of Entrepreneurs of the Irkutsk Oblast.
- Appoints the Prosecutor of Irkutsk Oblast.
- Submits the report to the President of Russia on the performance of the Executive bodies of Irkutsk Oblast.
- Has a right to conduct referendum in Irkutsk Oblast.
- Can dismissed the heads of local administration of Irkutsk Oblast.
- Give titles and awards of the Irkutsk Oblast.
- The Governor of Irkutsk Oblast exercises other powers in accordance with the Constitution of Russia and the Charter of Irkutsk Oblast.

== Distribution of duties ==
- Represents the Irkutsk Oblast in relations with federal state authorities, state authorities of other constituent entities of the Russian Federation, other state bodies of the Irkutsk Oblast, local governments and other municipal bodies of the municipal formations of the Irkutsk region, organizations, public associations and citizens, as well as international and foreign economic relations of the Irkutsk Oblast.
- Within the framework of determining the main areas of activity of the Government of the Irkutsk Oblast, issues instructions (instructions) to the First Deputy Governor of the Irkutsk Oblast - the Chairman of the Government of the Irkutsk Oblast, Deputy Governors of the Irkutsk Oblast, Deputy Chairmen of the Government of the Irkutsk Oblast, Ministers of the Irkutsk Oblast (hereinafter - members of the Government of the Irkutsk Oblast).

== Term of office ==
Since May 2003 the governor has been elected for a five-year term. Prior to this it was a four-year term.

== Current cabinet ==
All cabinet ministers are appointed by the Governor.

=== Current cabinet ===
As of March 2020, the cabinet members are as follows:

Kobzev Cabinet
Office	Office-holder
Governor	Igor Kobzev
First Deputy Governor	Konstantin Borisovich Zaitsev
First Deputy Governor	Dmitry Viktorovich Berdnikov
Deputy Governor	Vladimir Yuryevich Dorofeyev
Deputy Governor	Andrey Vladimirovich Kozlov
Deputy Governor	Anatoly Andriyanovich Prokopyev
Deputy Chairman of the Government	Ruslan Leonidovich Sitnikov
Deputy Chairman of the Government	Shamil Abdulaevich Baulov
Deputy Chairman of the Government	Yevgeny Pavlovich Levchenko
Deputy Chairman of the Government	Valentina Feofanovna Voblikova
Deputy Chairman of the Government	Teymur Talekhovich Magomedov
Minister of Property Relations	Marina Alexandrovna Bargazova
Minister of Culture	
Minister of Housing, Energy and Transport	
Minister of Construction and Road Management	Svetlana Dmitrievna Svirkina
Minister of Finance	Natalia Veniaminovna Boyarinova
Minister of Forestry	Dmitry Valerevich Petrenev
Minister of Youth Policy	Yegor Alexandrovich Lukovnikov
Minister of Natural Resources and Ecology	
Minister of Social Development	Vladimir Anatolyevich Rodionov
Minister of Health	Natalia Petrovna Ledyaeva
Minister of Sports	Ilya Yuryevich Reznik
Minister of Agriculture	Ilya Pavlovich Sumarokov
Minister of Labour and Employment	Natalya Vladimirovna Vorontsova
Minister of Education	Elena Vladimirovna Apanovich

== List of governors since 1991 ==
No.	Portrait	Governor	Tenure	Time in office	Party	Election
1		Yury Nozhikov (1934–2010)	19 September 1991 – 25 April 1997 (resigned)	5 years, 250 days	Independent	Appointed 1994
–		Yury Nozhikov (1934–2010)	25 April 1997 – 27 May 1997 (Note: After announcing his resignation, Nozhikov intended to remain in office until his successor is elected. His last known executive order is dated 27 May 1997. After that date, orders were signed by first deputy governor Vitaly Ivanov, although some Legislative Assembly resolutions from June 1997 mention Nozhikov as acting governor.)	5 years, 250 days	Independent	Acting
–		Vitaly Ivanov (born 1946)	27 May 1997 – 20 August 1997 (successor took office)	85 days	Independent	Acting
2		Boris Govorin (born 1947)	20 August 1997 – 8 September 2005 (was not renominated)	8 years, 19 days	Independent	1997; 2001
3		Alexander Tishanin (born 1966)	8 September 2005 – 15 April 2008 (resigned)	2 years, 220 days	United Russia	2005 (Note: Appointed by the president of Russia with the consent of the Legislative Assembly.)
–		Igor Yesipovsky (1960–2009)	15 April 2008 – 13 December 2008	1 year, 25 days	United Russia	Acting
4		Igor Yesipovsky (1960–2009)	13 December 2008 – 10 May 2009 (died in office)	1 year, 25 days	United Russia	2008
–		Sergey Sokol (born 1970)	10 May 2009 – 8 June 2009 (successor took office)	29 days	United Russia	Acting
5		Dmitry Mezentsev (born 1959)	8 June 2009 – 18 May 2012 (resigned)	2 years, 345 days	United Russia	2009
–		Sergey Yeroshchenko (born 1961)	18 May 2012 – 29 May 2012	3 years, 137 days	United Russia	Acting
6		Sergey Yeroshchenko (born 1961)	29 May 2012 – 13 May 2015 (resigned)	3 years, 137 days	United Russia	2012
–		Sergey Yeroshchenko (born 1961)	13 May 2015 – 2 October 2015 (lost election)	3 years, 137 days	United Russia	Acting
7		Sergey Levchenko (born 1953)	2 October 2015 – 12 December 2019 (resigned)	4 years, 71 days	Communist Party	2015
–		Igor Kobzev (born 1966)	12 December 2019 – 18 September 2020	6 years, 269 days	Independent → United Russia	Acting
8		Igor Kobzev (born 1966)	18 September 2020 – present	6 years, 269 days	Independent → United Russia	2020; 2025

== Heads of the region in previous eras ==
=== Irkutsk Governorate, Russian Empire (1783–1917) ===
#	Governor	Took office	Left office	Comments
1	Ivan Varfolomeyevich Jacobi	1783	1787	Governors General
2	Ivan Alferevich Pil	1787	1793	Governors General
3	Khristofor Ivanovich Treyden	1797	1798	Military Governors
4	Boris Borisovich Lezzano	1798	1800	Military Governors
5	Nikolai Petrovich Lebedev	1800	1803	Military Governors
6	Ivan Osipovich Selifontov	1803	1806	Governors General of Siberia
7	Ivan Borisovich Pestel	1806	1819	Governors General of Siberia
8	Mikhail Mikhailovich Speransky	1819	1822	Governors General of Siberia
9	Ivan Bogdanovich Tseidler	1822	1835	Governors
10	Aleksandr Nikolaevich Yevsevyev	1835	1838	Governors
11	Aleksey Iraklievich Levshin	1838	1839	Governors
12	Andrey Vasilyevich Pyatnitsky	1839	1848	Governors
13	Vladimir Nikolaevich Zarin	1848	1851	Governors
14	Karl-Burgard Karlovich von Wenzel	1851	1859	Governors
15	Pyotr Aleksandrovich Izvolsky	1859	1862	Governors
16	Nikolay Fedorovich Shcherbatsky	1862	1864	Governors
17	Konstantin Nikolaevich Shelashnikov	1864	1880	Governors
18	Ivan Konstantinovich Pedashenko	1880	1882	Governors
19	Sergey Ivanovich Nosovich	1882	1886	Governors
20	Vladimir Zakharovich Kolenko	1886	1889	Governors
21	Konstantin Nikolaevich Svetlitsky	1889	1897	Governors
22	Ivan Petrovich Mollerius	1897	1908	Governors
23	Pyotr Karlovich Gran	1908	1911	Governors
24	Fyodor Aleksandrovich Bantysh	1911	1913	Governors
25	Aleksandr Nikolaevich Yugan	1913	1917	Governors

=== Soviet Union ===
==== Siberian Krai (1925–1930) ====
#	Ispolkom chairman	Took office	Left office
1	Robert Eikhe	1925	1930
2	Stepan Kuznetsov	1929	1930

==== East Siberian Krai (1930–1937) ====
#	Ispolkom chairman	Took office	Left office
1	Nikolai Zimin	1930	1932
2	Vasily Bukati	1932	1934
3	Yakov Pakhomov	1934	1937

==== Irkutsk Oblast (1937–1991) ====
#	Ispolkom chairman	Term
1	Aleksandr Ivanov (acting)	1937–1938
2	Semyon Novak	1939–1942
3	Nikolay Komissarov	1942–1944
4	Vasily Ivanov	1944–1947
5	Innokenty Nikolsky	1947–1952
6	Aleksandr Burdakov	1952–1956
7	Semyon Shchetinin	1956–1957
8	Aleksandr Gritsenko	1957–1962
–	Aleksandr Gritsenko (rural) and Viktor Maltsev (industrial)	1962–1964
8	Aleksandr Gritsenko	1964–1965
9	Viktor Maltsev	1965–1967
10	Yury Kravchenko	1967–1976
11	Aleksey Sokolov	1976–1984
12	Aleksey Kovalchuk	1984–1988
13	Yury Nozhikov	1988–1991

#	Obkom First Secretary	Term
1	Aleksandr Shcherbakov	1937–1938
2	Arkady Fillipov	1938–1939
3	Kirill Kachalin	1939–1944
4	Aleksandr Yefimov	1944–1949
5	Alexey Khuvorustukhin	1949–1955
6	Boris Kobelev	1955–1957
7	Semyon Shchetinin	1957–1968
8	Nikolai Bannikov	1968–1983
9	Vasily Sitnikov	1983–1988
10	Vladimir Potapov	1988–1990
11	Viktor Spirin	1990–1991
