= 2023 Irkutsk Oblast Legislative Assembly election =

- 8–10 September 2023
- Turnout: 24.21%
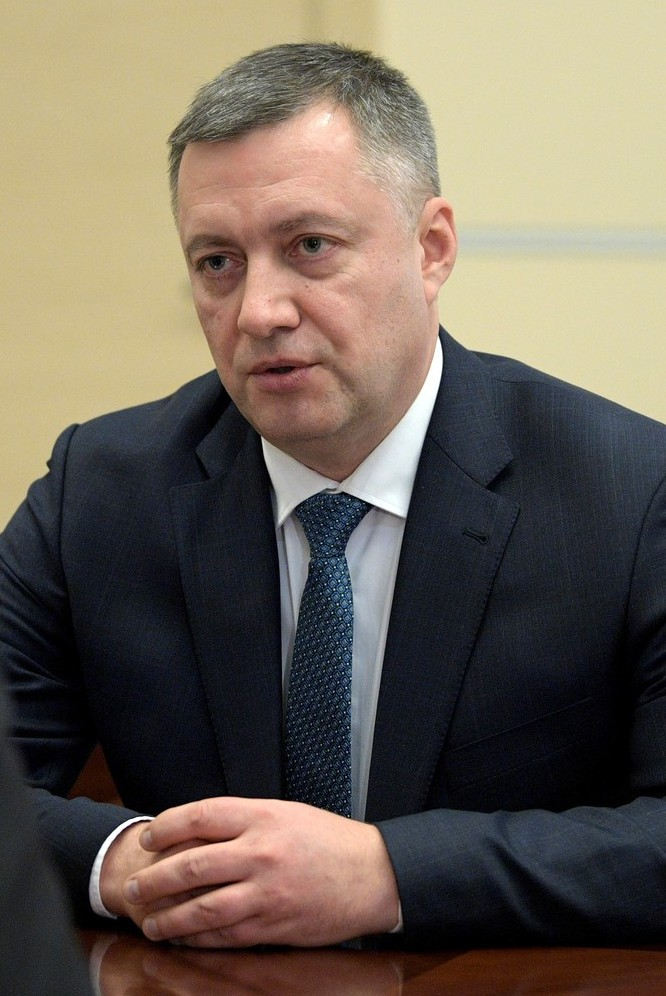

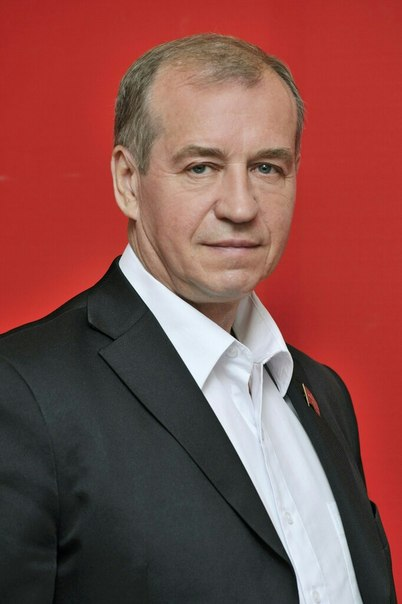

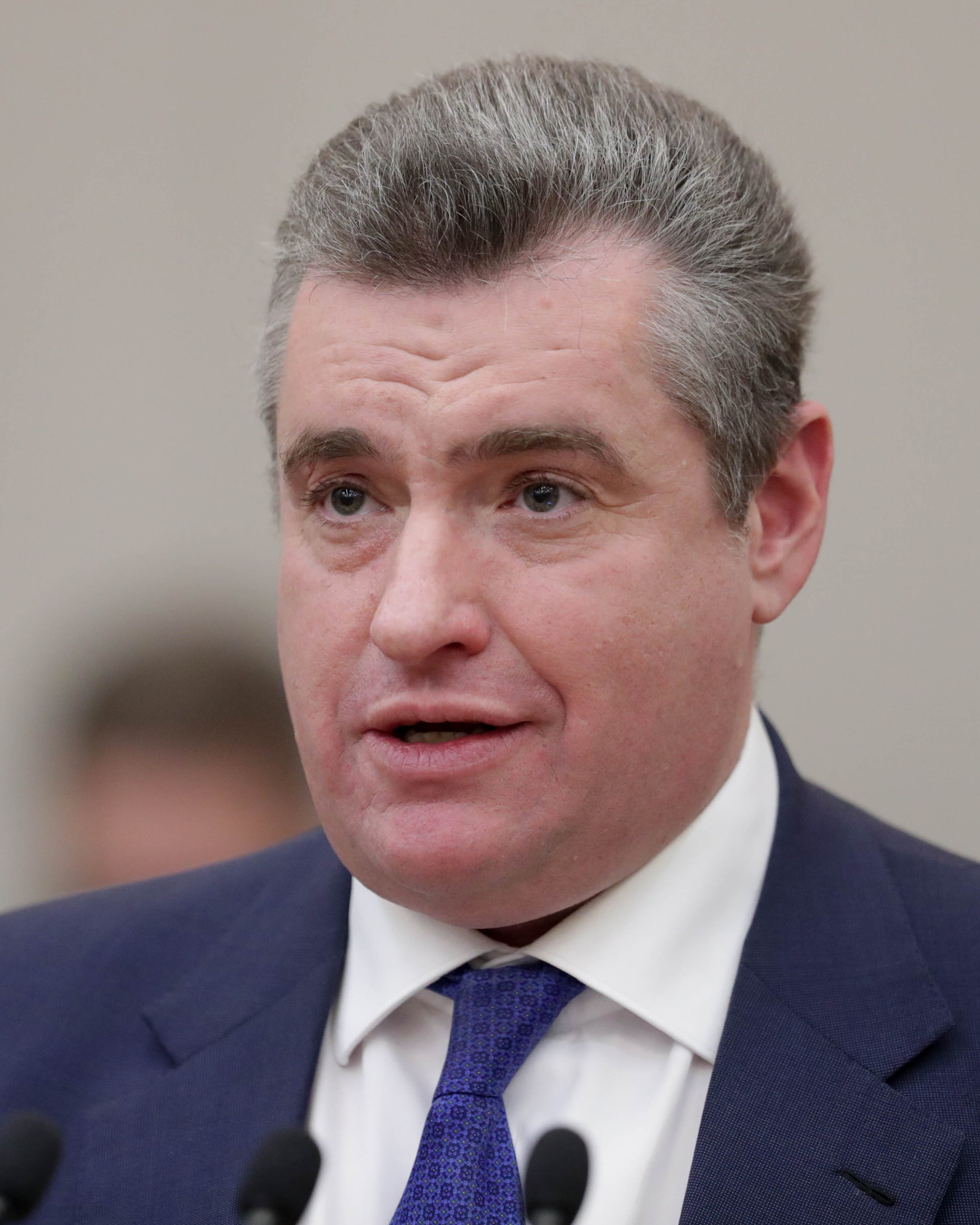
	Majority party	Minority party	Third party
Candidate	Igor Kobzev	Sergey Levchenko	Leonid Slutsky
Leader	Dmitry Medvedev	Gennady Zyuganov	Leonid Slutsky
Party	United Russia	CPRF	LDPR
Last election	17 seats, 27.83%	18 seats, 33.94%	4 seats, 15.80%
Seats won	35	4	2
Seat change	▲18	▼14	▼2
Popular vote	242,261	68,644	42,694
Percentage	54.60%	15.47%	9.62%
Swing	▲26.77%	▼18.47%	▼6.18%
	Fourth party	Fifth party	Sixth party
	NL	SR-ZP	RPSS
Candidate	Aleksandr Gudkov	Larisa Yegorova	Lilia Negrun
Leader	Aleksey Nechayev	Sergey Mironov	Konstantin Rykov
Party	New People	SR-ZP	RPSS
Last election	Did not exist	3 seats, 7.04%	0 seats, 4.84%
Seats won	2	2	0
Seat change	Did not exist	▼1	Steady
Popular vote	32,587	31,314	5,901
Percentage	7.34%	7.06%	1.33%
Swing	Did not exist	▲0.02%	▼3.51%

The 2023 Legislative Assembly of Irkutsk Oblast election took place on 8–10 September 2023, on common election day. All 45 seats in the Legislative Assembly were up for reelection.

== Electoral system ==
Under current election laws, the Legislative Assembly is elected for a term of five years, with parallel voting. 23 seats are elected by party-list proportional representation with a 5% electoral threshold, with the other half elected in 22 single-member constituencies by first-past-the-post voting. Seats in the proportional part are allocated using the Imperiali quota, modified to ensure that every party list, which passes the threshold, receives at least one mandate.

== Candidates ==
=== Party lists ===
To register regional lists of candidates, parties need to collect 0.5% of signatures of all registered voters in Irkutsk Oblast.

The following parties were relieved from the necessity to collect signatures:

- United Russia
- Communist Party of the Russian Federation
- A Just Russia — Patriots — For Truth
- Liberal Democratic Party of Russia
- New People
- Civic Platform
- Russian Party of Freedom and Justice

№	Party	Oblast-wide list	Candidates	Territorial groups	Status
1	Communist Party	Sergey Levchenko	96	22	Registered
2	New People	Aleksandr Gudkov • Valery Us • Dmitry Li	101	22	Registered
3	United Russia	Igor Kobzev • Konstantin Zaytsev • Aleksandr Veprev	107	22	Registered
4	A Just Russia – For Truth	Larisa Yegorova • Aleksandr Gaskov • Alexandr Zubkov	77	21	Registered
5	Civic Platform	Grigory Vakulenko • Anton Uglanov • Nikolay Ignatyev	85	22	Registered
6	Liberal Democratic Party	Leonid Slutsky • Oleg Popov • Andrey Dukhovnikov	104	22	Registered
7	RPSS	Lilia Negrun	65	20	Registered
	Communists of Russia	Vladimir Sukhankin	61	20	Failed to qualify

New People will take part in Irkutsk Oblast legislative election for the first time, while Rodina, who participated in the last election, did not file.

=== Single-mandate constituencies ===
22 single-mandate constituencies were formed in Irkutsk Oblast. To register candidates in single-mandate constituencies need to collect 3% of signatures of registered voters in the constituency.

Number of candidates in single-mandate constituencies
Party	Candidates	
Party	Nominated	Registered
Communist Party	20	18
United Russia	22	22
Liberal Democratic Party	22	22
A Just Russia — For Truth	22	21
RPSS	8	7
Civic Platform	20	19
New People	20	20
Independent	2	0
Total	136	129

== Polls ==
Fieldwork date	Polling firm	UR	CPRF	LDPR	NL	SR-ZP	CPCR	GP	RPSS
1–20 August 2023	Russian Field	55%	14%	12%	11%	6%	2%	1%	<1%

== Results ==
=== Results by party lists ===
Summary of the 8–10 September 2023 Legislative Assembly of Irkutsk Oblast election results
Party	Party list					Constituency		Total	
Party	Votes	%	±pp	Seats	+/–	Seats	+/–	Seats	+/–
United Russia	242,261	54.60	▲26.77%	14	▲6	21	▲12	35	▲18
Communist Party	68,644	15.47	▼18.47%	4	▼5	0	▼9	4	▼14
Liberal Democratic Party	42,694	9.62	▼6.18%	2	▼2	0	Steady	2	▼2
New People	32,587	7.34	New	2	New	0	New	2	New
A Just Russia — For Truth	31,314	7.06	▲0.02%	1	▼1	1	Steady	2	▼1
Russian Party of Freedom and Justice	5,901	1.33	▼3.51%	0	Steady	0	Steady	0	Steady
Civic Platform	4,357	0.98	▼3.77%	0	Steady	0	▼3	0	▼3
Invalid ballots	15,907	3.59	▼0.90%	—	—	—	—	—	—
Total	443,665	100.00	—	23	Steady	22	Steady	45	Steady
Turnout	443,665	24.21	▼2.12%	—	—	—	—	—	—
Registered voters	1,832,725	100.00	—	—	—	—	—	—	—

Aleksandr Vedernikov (United Russia) was re-elected as Chairman of the Legislative Assembly, while incumbent Senator Sergei Brilka (United Russia) was re-appointed to the Federation Council.

=== Results in single-member constituencies ===
==== District 1 ====
Summary of the 8–10 September 2023 Legislative Assembly of Irkutsk Oblast election in District 1
Candidate	Party	Votes	%
Aleksey Rasputin	United Russia	8,737	51.73%
Aleksandr Perevalov	Communist Party	2,809	16.63%
Igor Zuyev	A Just Russia — For Truth	1,966	11.64%
Vladimir Dmitriyev	Liberal Democratic Party	1,127	6.67%
Sergey Pavlovsky	New People	956	5.66%
Lyudmila Zuyeva	Civic Platform	398	2.36%
Sergey Perevalov	Russian Party of Freedom and Justice	360	2.13%
Total		16,890	100%

==== District 2 ====
Summary of the 8–10 September 2023 Legislative Assembly of Irkutsk Oblast election in District 2
Candidate	Party	Votes	%
Dmitry Ruzhnikov	United Russia	8,995	56.53%
Aleksandr Kachin (incumbent)	Communist Party	2,454	15.42%
Aleksandr Bryzgalov	New People	1,561	9.81%
Olga Andriyesh	A Just Russia — For Truth	835	5.25%
Viktor Galitskov	Liberal Democratic Party	827	5.20%
Nikita Kochin	Russian Party of Freedom and Justice	390	2.45%
Lina Manzhula	Civic Platform	376	2.36%
Total		15,911	100%

==== District 3 ====
Summary of the 8–10 September 2023 Legislative Assembly of Irkutsk Oblast election in District 3
Candidate	Party	Votes	%
Aleksey Krasnoshtanov (incumbent)	United Russia	9,939	63.90%
Darya Sushakova	New People	1,695	10.90%
Aleksey Shcherbakov	Liberal Democratic Party	1,472	9.46%
Stanislav Chepurnykh	A Just Russia — For Truth	1,283	8.25%
Svetlana Pechkina	Civic Platform	491	3.16%
Total		15,553	100%

==== District 4 ====
Summary of the 8–10 September 2023 Legislative Assembly of Irkutsk Oblast election in District 4
Candidate	Party	Votes	%
Maksim Devochkin	United Russia	5,850	38.76%
Anton Romanov (incumbent)	Communist Party	4,078	27.02%
Andrey Dudko	A Just Russia — For Truth	1,628	10.79%
Konstantin Yuryev	New People	1,453	9.63%
Dmitry Sokolov	Liberal Democratic Party	1,154	7.65%
Ruslan Romanenko	Russian Party of Freedom and Justice	344	2.28%
Total		15,094	100%

==== District 5 ====
Summary of the 8–10 September 2023 Legislative Assembly of Irkutsk Oblast election in District 5
Candidate	Party	Votes	%
Sergey Balyaskin	United Russia	5,847	46.43%
Pavel Matveyev	A Just Russia — For Truth	2,633	20.91%
Dmitry Ushakov	Liberal Democratic Party	1,355	10.76%
Mikhail Lufarenko	New People	1,278	10.15%
Maksim Negrun	Civic Platform	484	3.84%
Yevgeny Ponomarev	Russian Party of Freedom and Justice	286	2.27%
Total		12,594	100%

==== District 6 ====
Summary of the 8–10 September 2023 Legislative Assembly of Irkutsk Oblast election in District 6
Candidate	Party	Votes	%
Anton Malyshev	A Just Russia — For Truth	6,081	40.57%
Dmitry Turushev	United Russia	3,729	24.88%
Olga Nosenko	Communist Party	1,987	13.26%
Tatyana Bashkatova	New People	1,474	9.83%
Mikhail Valyushkin	Liberal Democratic Party	878	5.86%
Pavel Stepanov	Civic Platform	237	1.58%
Total		14,988	100%

==== District 7 ====
Summary of the 8–10 September 2023 Legislative Assembly of Irkutsk Oblast election in District 7
Candidate	Party	Votes	%
Antonina Kokoshnikova	United Russia	9,908	49.23%
Andrey Bolgov	A Just Russia — For Truth	5,104	25.36%
Dmitry Tyutrin	Liberal Democratic Party	1,735	8.62%
Irina Litvintseva	New People	1,259	6.26%
Igor Kern	Civic Platform	644	3.20%
Total		20,125	100%

==== District 8 ====
Summary of the 8–10 September 2023 Legislative Assembly of Irkutsk Oblast election in District 8
Candidate	Party	Votes	%
Denis Yagodzinsky	United Russia	11,476	59.54%
Sergey Brenyuk	Communist Party	3,121	16.19%
Sergey Sarkisov	Liberal Democratic Party	1,614	8.37%
Igor Zhubrin	New People	1,171	6.08%
Ilya Siliveyev	A Just Russia — For Truth	566	2.94%
Anastasia Dudnik	Civic Platform	453	2.35%
Total		19,275	100%

==== District 9 ====
Summary of the 8–10 September 2023 Legislative Assembly of Irkutsk Oblast election in District 9
Candidate	Party	Votes	%
Yevgeny Zenkin	United Russia	10,604	56.91%
Georgy Lyubenkov	Liberal Democratic Party	3,517	18.87%
Andrey Andreyev (incumbent)	Communist Party	1,926	10.34%
Dmitry Yablontsev	New People	998	5.36%
Vladimir Izyuryev	A Just Russia — For Truth	702	3.77%
Yevgeny Simakov	Civic Platform	246	1.32%
Total		18,634	100%

==== District 10 ====
Summary of the 8–10 September 2023 Legislative Assembly of Irkutsk Oblast election in District 10
Candidate	Party	Votes	%
Eduard Demin	United Russia	10,715	43.39%
Andrey Kozlov	A Just Russia — For Truth	7,320	29.64%
Oleg Popov	Liberal Democratic Party	2,506	10.15%
Svetlana Petruk (incumbent)	Communist Party	1,810	7.33%
Diana Belikova	New People	1,113	4.51%
Total		24,693	100%

==== District 11 ====
Summary of the 8–10 September 2023 Legislative Assembly of Irkutsk Oblast election in District 11
Candidate	Party	Votes	%
Fyodor Salomatov	United Russia	7,763	41.36%
Larisa Yegorova	A Just Russia — For Truth	4,576	24.38%
Sergey Lipin	New People	1,895	10.10%
Pavel Mokretsov	Communist Party	1,433	7.63%
Vitaly Bryukhanov	Liberal Democratic Party	999	5.32%
Yelena Yegorova	Russian Party of Freedom and Justice	865	4.61%
Daniil Yefremov	Civic Platform	275	1.47%
Total		18,771	100%

==== District 12 ====
Summary of the 8–10 September 2023 Legislative Assembly of Irkutsk Oblast election in District 12
Candidate	Party	Votes	%
Timur Sagdeyev (incumbent)	United Russia	10,572	53.76%
Maksim Ignatov	Liberal Democratic Party	3,849	19.57%
Alexandr Zubkov	A Just Russia — For Truth	2,042	10.38%
Vladimir Belyakov	Civic Platform	1,192	6.06%
Dmitry Li	New People	1,056	5.37%
Total		19,667	100%

==== District 13 ====
Summary of the 8–10 September 2023 Legislative Assembly of Irkutsk Oblast election in District 13
Candidate	Party	Votes	%
Galina Kudrayvtseva (incumbent)	United Russia	8,390	54.66%
Tatyana Yerokhina	Communist Party	2,228	14.52%
Viktor Vlasov	A Just Russia — For Truth	1,829	11.92%
Andrey Dukhovnikov	Liberal Democratic Party	1,777	11.58%
Fyodor Bogomolov	Civic Platform	551	3.59%
Total		15,349	100%

==== District 14 ====
Summary of the 8–10 September 2023 Legislative Assembly of Irkutsk Oblast election in District 14
Candidate	Party	Votes	%
Stepan Frantenko	United Russia	14,463	64.67%
Roman Gabov	Communist Party	3,248	14.52%
Valery Us	New People	1,832	8.19%
Aleksey Knyazev	A Just Russia — For Truth	1,297	5.80%
Denis Kulagin	Liberal Democratic Party	436	1.95%
Olga Veshkurtseva	Civic Platform	435	1.95%
Total		22,364	100%

==== District 15 ====
Summary of the 8–10 September 2023 Legislative Assembly of Irkutsk Oblast election in District 15
Candidate	Party	Votes	%
Viktor Poboykin (incumbent)	United Russia	15,428	60.49%
Anatoly Shapkin	Communist Party	2,982	11.69%
Anastasia Fedorovich	Liberal Democratic Party	2,397	9.40%
Konstantin Yevdokimov	New People	2,076	8.14%
Andrey Butenko	Civic Platform	1,256	4.92%
Total		25,504	100%

==== District 16 ====
Summary of the 8–10 September 2023 Legislative Assembly of Irkutsk Oblast election in District 16
Candidate	Party	Votes	%
Dmitry Myasnikov	United Russia	14,213	62.41%
Aleksey Yermushkin	Communist Party	2,809	12.34%
Pyotr Naumkin	New People	2,061	9.05%
Anna Ishchenkova	Liberal Democratic Party	2,056	9.03%
Mikhail Trufanov	A Just Russia — For Truth	957	4.20%
Total		22,772	100%

==== District 17 ====
Summary of the 8–10 September 2023 Legislative Assembly of Irkutsk Oblast election in District 17
Candidate	Party	Votes	%
Yury Kozlov	United Russia	22,285	76.10%
Andrey Akhmadulin	Communist Party	3,721	12.71%
Olga Zhigman	A Just Russia — For Truth	964	3.29%
Roman Ubinin	Liberal Democratic Party	587	2.00%
Anton Grigoryev	Civic Platform	535	1.83%
Anzhelika Shitova	New People	523	1.79%
Total		29,285	100%

==== District 18 ====
Summary of the 8–10 September 2023 Legislative Assembly of Irkutsk Oblast election in District 18
Candidate	Party	Votes	%
Natalya Dikusarova (incumbent)	United Russia	11,968	62.14%
Yulia Klimova	Communist Party	3,920	20.35%
Aleksey Pinchuk	Liberal Democratic Party	1,322	6.86%
Anastasia Koval	A Just Russia — For Truth	1,048	5.44%
Aleksandr Monichev	Civic Platform	455	2.36%
Total		19,260	100%

==== District 19 ====
Summary of the 8–10 September 2023 Legislative Assembly of Irkutsk Oblast election in District 19
Candidate	Party	Votes	%
Tatyana Molostova	United Russia	7,059	48.38%
Aleksey Trufanov	Communist Party	2,213	15.17%
Yevgeny Likhachyov	A Just Russia — For Truth	1,947	13.34%
Denis Nekipelov	Liberal Democratic Party	1,739	11.92%
Roman Baybekov	New People	493	3.38%
Adam Abdullayev	Civic Platform	398	2.73%
Total		14,590	100%

==== District 20 ====
Summary of the 8–10 September 2023 Legislative Assembly of Irkutsk Oblast election in District 20
Candidate	Party	Votes	%
Vitaly Peretolchin (incumbent)	United Russia	9,421	56.81%
Anatoly Dubas	A Just Russia — For Truth	2,628	15.85%
Yulia Pogodayeva	New People	1,166	7.03%
Natalya Shestakova	Communist Party	1,076	6.49%
Vasily Yakimov	Liberal Democratic Party	799	4.82%
Andrey Makovsky	Civic Platform	581	3.50%
Lyudmila Grakhova	Russian Party of Freedom and Justice	258	1.56%
Total		16,583	100%

==== District 21 ====
Summary of the 8–10 September 2023 Legislative Assembly of Irkutsk Oblast election in District 21
Candidate	Party	Votes	%
Nikolay Trufanov (incumbent)	United Russia	8,805	55.50%
Aleksandr Antonov	Liberal Democratic Party	1,945	12.26%
Ivan Pegov	Communist Party	1,539	9.70%
Tatyana Timofeyeva	Russian Party of Freedom and Justice	1,005	6.34%
Aleksandr Gudkov	New People	920	5.80%
Vladimir Bukhantsov	A Just Russia — For Truth	652	4.11%
Stepan Yevseyev	Civic Platform	409	2.58%
Total		15,864	100%

==== District 22 ====
Summary of the 8–10 September 2023 Legislative Assembly of Irkutsk Oblast election in District 22
Candidate	Party	Votes	%
Kuzma Aldarov (incumbent)	United Russia	27,927	63.39%
Anastasia Kovtun	New People	4,642	10.54%
Raisa Osipova	Communist Party	4,092	9.29%
Sergey Khubrakov	Liberal Democratic Party	2,284	5.18%
Boris Lazarev	Civic Platform	1,821	4.13%
Yevgenia Matapova	A Just Russia — For Truth	1,808	4.10%
Total		44,054	100%

== See also ==
- 2023 Russian regional elections
