= Yury Nozhikov =

Russian politician

- Юрий Ножиков
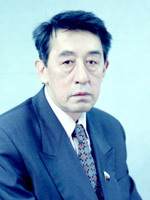

1st Governor of Irkutsk Oblast
- In office 19 September 1991 – 25 April 1997
- Preceded by: Office established
- Succeeded by: Boris Govorin

Member of the Federation Council from Irkutsk Oblast
- In office 11 January 1994 – 25 April 1997
- Preceded by: Office established
- Succeeded by: Boris Govorin

12th Chairman of Irkutsk Oblast Executive Committee
- In office 14 July 1988 – 19 September 1991
- Preceded by: Alexey Kovalchuk
- Succeeded by: Office abolished

Personal details
- Born: Yury Leonidovich Chen; 17 February 1934 Leningrad, Russian SFSR, Soviet Union
- Died: 15 June 2010 (aged 76) Irkutsk, Russia
- Education: Ivanovo State Power Engineering University
- Awards: Order of the Red Banner of Labour

Yury Abramovich Nozhikov (Russian: Юрий Абрамович Ножиков, 17 February 1934 – 15 June 2010) was a Soviet and Russian politician who was the first governor of Irkutsk Oblast (East Siberia) in 1991–1997.

== Early life ==
Yury Chen was born in Leningrad (modern Saint Petersburg) in 1934 to a Chinese father Chen Kin San (Leonid Chen) and Russian mother Tatyana Toropova, who was working as nurse. His father most likely fell under Stalinist repressions in 1937. Later, Yury's mother remarried Jewish worker Abram Moiseyevich Nozhikov, and the boy received his last name and patronymic.

The fact is that in 1937 he disappeared. They said he died of tuberculosis. But he was not sick, we did not visit him in the hospital. If he was sick, there would be something left, some papers. But there was nothing, he disappeared, and that's it.
... Why did she do it? I think she feared for my future life. If the father was really repressed — and, probably, it was so — I wouldn't have any future.

Abram Nozhikov died in the Great Patriotic War in 1942.

In 1956, Nozhikov graduated from the Ivanovo Power Engineering Institute. He worked at the largest construction sites in the Urals, Siberia, the Far East and the Far North. Since 1970 he was the manager of VostokEnergoMontazh trust, from 1984 to 1988 — general director of BratskGESstroy.

== Political career ==
In 1961, he joined the Communist Party of the Soviet Union. From 1988 to 1991 Nozhikov was chairman of the executive committee of the Irkutsk Regional Council of People's Deputies. He was elected a member of the Supreme Soviet of the RSFSR of the 11th and 12th convocations.

=== Governorship ===
On 19 September 1991, the President of Russia Boris Yeltsin appointed Nozhikov as the head of Irkutsk Oblast administration.

During the preparation of the Federation Treaty with krais, oblasts and federal cities on 31 March 1992 Nozhikov went on a confrontation with the federal government in regional interests. On the morning of March 31, at a meeting with governors and the chief federal inspector Valery Makharadze, Nozhikov proposed to consider an additional Protocol that slightly smooths out the status inequality of the autonomous republics and other regions in matters of lawmaking, state property, the principles of the budgetary system, etc. None of his colleagues supported him. By signing the Treaty, Nozhikov added a line "Taking into account the signed protocol." In September 1992 Nozhikov refused to comply with the presidential decree requiring the transfer of at least 49% of the shares of joint-stock companies established on the basis of Soviet energy enterprises to the statutory fund of the United Energy System of Russia.

He was the co-chairman of the All-Russian Union "Renewal" (1992–93), since June 1992 he was a member of the Political and Consultative Council of the Civic Union.

On 20 March 1993, president Yeltsin announced his decide to remove from offices Vitaly Mukha of Novosibirsk Oblast and Yury Nozhikov "for violating the law." After the protests of the Lesser Soviet of Irkutsk Oblast Yeltsin renounced his decision.

Yury Nozhikov initiated the first elections of local self-government bodies in Russia. The possibility of holding such elections was provided by the Constitution of the Russian Federation, adopted on December 12. On the same day Nozhikov was elected member of the first Federation Council. On 27 March 1994 he was elected governor of Irkutsk Oblast with 78.16% of the vote. He was deputy chairman of the Council of Governors of Russia, Chairman of the Mineral Use Committee of the "Siberian Agreement" interregional association.

On 25 April 1997, Nozhikov resigned from office citing ill health and "coming of another period" in regions' relations with the federal government. He was succeeded by mayor of Irkutsk Boris Govorin, who defeated Communist Sergey Levchenko.

Yury Nozhikov died in Irkutsk on 15 June 2010.

== Awards ==
- Two Orders of the Red Banner of Labour (1971, 1981)
- USSR State Prize (1985) — "for the creation of the Bilibino Nuclear Power Plant"
- Order of Friendship of Peoples (1994) — "for his great contribution to the implementation of economic reforms, active work to consolidate democratic forces and strengthen Russian statehood"
