= Vladimir Kuznetsov =

Vladimir Kuznetsov is a name of Russian origin.

It may refer to:

- Vladimir Kuznetsov (archaeologist) (1927–2024), Russian archaeologist
- Vladimir Kuznetsov (diplomat) (born 1957), Russian diplomat; head of the United Nations Committee for Administrative and Budgetary Issues
- Vladimir Kuznetsov (weightlifter, born 1984), Kazakhstani Olympic weightlifter
- Vladimir Kuznetsov (weightlifter, born 1963), Soviet weightlifter
- Vladimir Kuznetsov (water polo) (born 1937), Russian Olympic water polo player
- Vladimir Kuznetsov (javelin thrower) (1931–1986), Soviet javelin thrower
- Vladimir Kuznetsov (footballer) (1938–2016), Soviet-Russian footballer, referee
- Vladimir Kuznetsov (cyclist) (1945–2026), Soviet cyclist
- Vladimir Kuznetsov (prankster) (born 1986), best known as Vovan, Russian prankster
- Vladimir Kuznetsov (politician) (born 1954), Russian politician

== See also ==
- Kuznetsov
