= Governor of Primorsky Krai =

Highest-ranking official in Primorsky Krai, Russia

- Coat of arms of Primorsky Krai

- Incumbent; Konstantin Shestakov; Acting since 22 October 2026
- Seat: Vladivostok
- Term length: 5 years
- Inaugural holder: Vladimir Kuznetsov
- Formation: 1991
- Website: www.primorsky.ru

The governor of Primorsky Krai (Russian: Губернатор Приморского края) heads the executive branch of Primorsky Krai, a federal subject of Russia, situated in the Far Eastern region of the country. The governor is elected by direct popular vote for the term of five years.

== List of officeholders ==
No.	Portrait	Governor	Tenure	Time in office	Party	Election
1		Vladimir Kuznetsov (born 1954)	8 October 1991 – 24 May 1993 (resigned)	1 year, 228 days	Independent	Appointed
2		Yevgeny Nazdratenko (born 1949)	24 May 1993 – 6 February 2001 (resigned)	7 years, 258 days	Independent	Appointed 1995; 1999
—		Valentin Dubinin (born 1946)	6 February 2001 – 27 April 2001 (resigned to run for a full term)	80 days	Independent	Acting
—		Igor Belchuk (born 1947)	27 April 2001 – 7 May 2001 (removed by court decision)	10 days	Independent	Acting
—		Konstantin Tolstoshein (born 1952)	7 May 2001 – 25 June 2001 (successor took office)	49 days	Independent	Acting
3		Sergey Darkin (born 1963)	25 June 2001 – 28 February 2012 (resigned)	10 years, 248 days	Independent → United Russia	2001; 2005 (Note: Appointed by the president of Russia with the consent of the Legislative Assembly.); 2010
—		Vladimir Miklushevsky (born 1967)	28 February 2012 – 16 March 2012	5 years, 218 days	United Russia	Acting
4		Vladimir Miklushevsky (born 1967)	16 March 2012 – 31 May 2014 (resigned)	5 years, 218 days	United Russia	2012
—		Vladimir Miklushevsky (born 1967)	31 May 2014 – 22 September 2014	5 years, 218 days	United Russia	Acting
(4)		Vladimir Miklushevsky (born 1967)	22 September 2014 – 4 October 2017 (resigned)	5 years, 218 days	United Russia	2014
—		Andrey Tarasenko (born 1963)	4 October 2017 – 26 September 2018 (resigned)	357 days	United Russia	Acting Sep 2018 (annulled)
—		Oleg Kozhemyako (born 1962)	26 September 2018 – 20 December 2018	8 years, 26 days	United Russia	Acting
5		Oleg Kozhemyako (born 1962)	20 December 2018 – 22 October 2026 (resigned)	8 years, 26 days	United Russia	Dec 2018; 2023
—		Konstantin Shestakov (born 1982)	22 October 2026 – present	16 days	United Russia	Acting
