= Bryłka =

Bryłka also Brylka, Bryllka ('ll' is an archaic rendering of 'ł'), Brilka is a Polish surname. Notable people with the surname include:

- Anna Bryłka (born 1990), Polish politician and lawyer
- Gerda Bryłka (born 1941), Polish gymnast
- Georg Brylka, Polish engineer and politician of the German minority, M.P.
- Sergei Brilka, Russian politician
