= Sergey Darkin =

Sergey Darkin may refer to:

- Sergey Mikhaylovich Darkin (born 1963), Russian politician
- Sergey Darkin (speedway rider) (born 1973), Russian motorcycle speedway rider
