= Andrey Chernyshev =

Russian politician (born 1970)

- Андрей Чернышёв
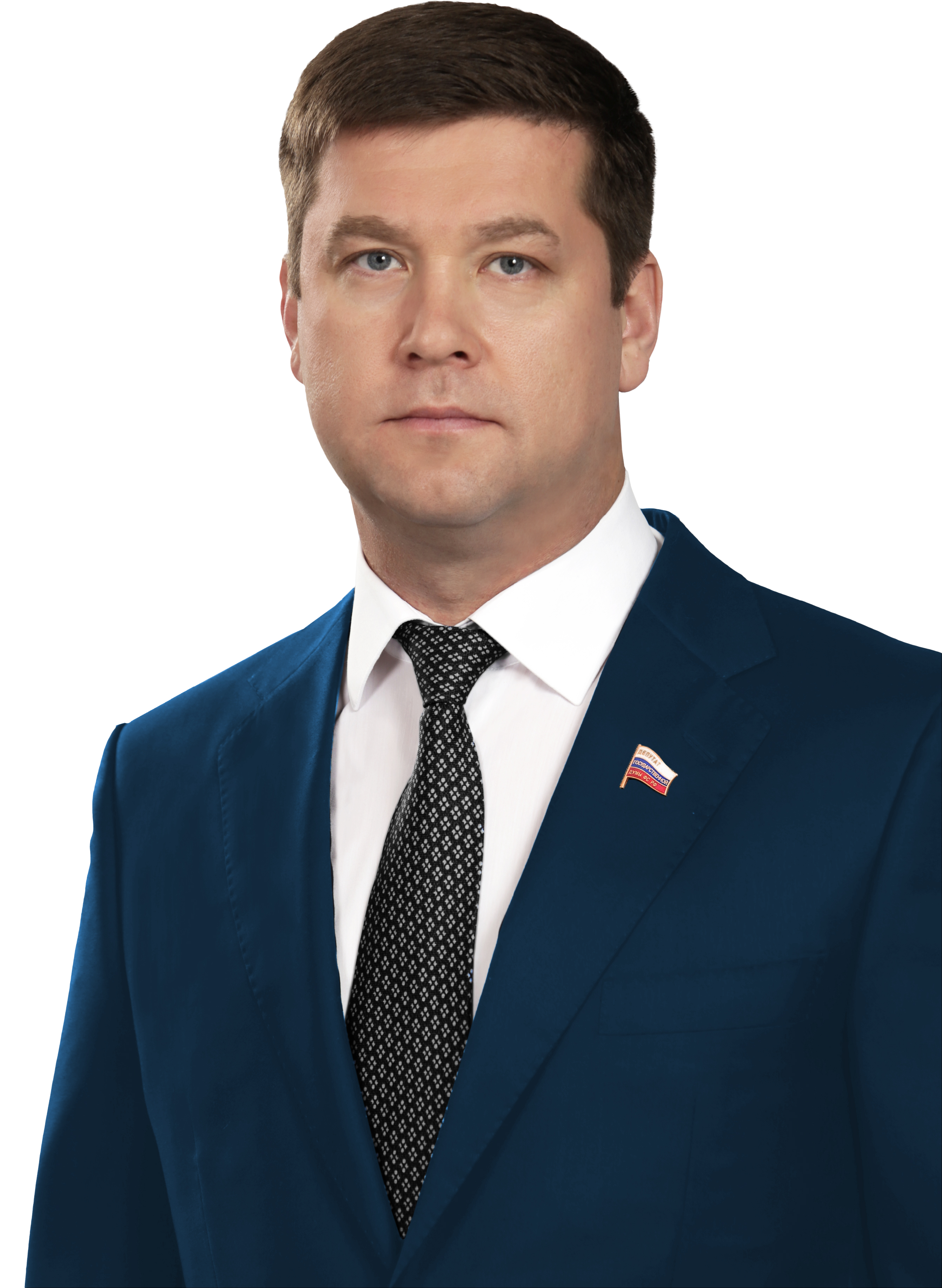

Senator from Irkutsk Oblast
- Incumbent
- Assumed office 18 September 2020
- Preceded by: Vyacheslav Markhayev

Personal details
- Born: Andrey Chernyshev; 10 July 1970 (age 56) Bratsk, Irkutsk Oblast, Soviet Union
- Education: Irkutsk State University

Andrey Vladimirovich Chernyshev (Russian: Андрей Владимирович Чернышёв; born 10 July 1970) is a Russian politician serving as a senator from Irkutsk Oblast since 18 September 2020.

== Career ==
Andrey Chernyshev was born on 10 July 1970， in Bratsk, Irkutsk Oblast. In 1997, he graduated from Bratsk State University. In 2004, he also graduated from Irkutsk State University. From 1988 to 1990, he served in the Soviet Army. In 1996, he founded the company "Tsentr". From 1996 to 2001, Chernyshev served as a Deputy General Director, then as General Director of the company. On 10 October 2004, he was elected deputy of the Legislative Assembly of Irkutsk Oblast at the 4th convocation. The same year, he founded a charity foundation. On 12 October 2008, he was again elected deputy of the Legislative Assembly of Irkutsk Oblast. In 2013, Chernyshev was re-elected. On 18 September 2020, he was appointed a senator from Irkutsk Oblast.

== Sanctions ==
Andrey Chernyshev is under personal sanctions introduced by the European Union, the United Kingdom, the US, Canada, Switzerland, Australia, Ukraine, and New Zealand, for ratifying the decisions of the "Treaty of Friendship, Cooperation and Mutual Assistance between the Russian Federation and the Donetsk People's Republic and between the Russian Federation and the Luhansk People's Republic" and providing political and economic support for Russia's annexation of Ukrainian territories.
