= Igor Kobzev =

8th governor of Irkutsk Oblast

- Игорь Кобзев
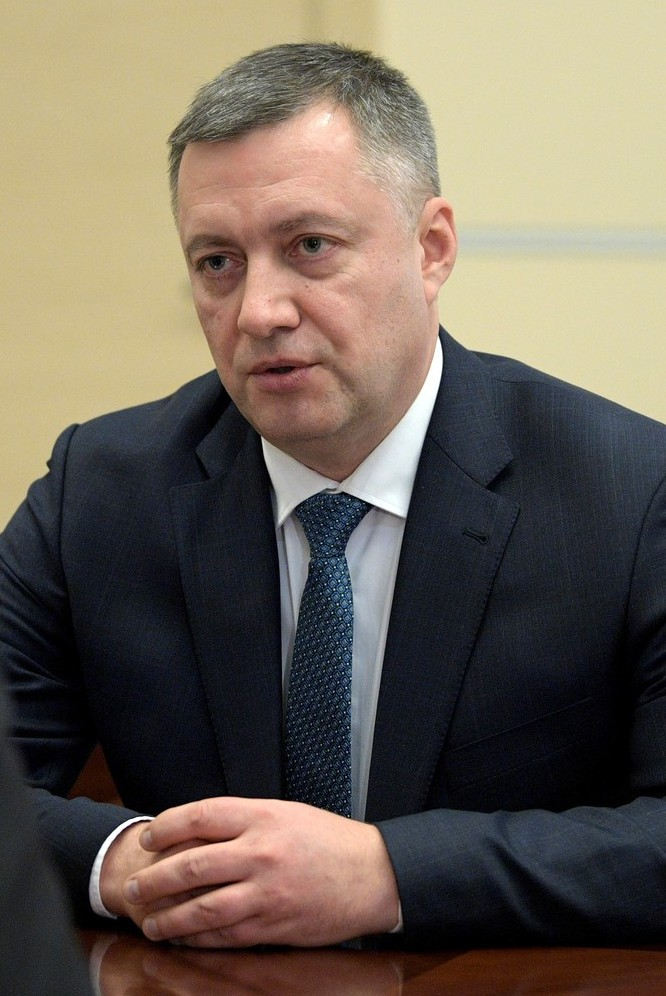
- Kobzev in 2019

8th Governor of Irkutsk Oblast
- Incumbent
- Assumed office 18 September 2020
- Preceded by: Sergey Levchenko

Acting Governor of Irkutsk Oblast
- In office 12 December 2019 – 18 September 2020

Personal details
- Born: Igor Ivanovich Kobzev; 29 October 1966 (age 59) Voronezh, Soviet Union

Igor Ivanovich Kobzev (Russian: Игорь Иванович Кобзев; born 29 October 1966), is a Russian statesman and former army officer, who is the incumbent 8th Governor of Irkutsk Oblast since 18 September 2020. He had previously been the acting governor, since 12 December 2019.

Since 2019 he holds the rank of Colonel General of the Internal Service.

== Biography ==
Igor Kobzev was born on 19 October 1966 in Voronezh. From a family with a long military tradition, his grandfather participated in the Eastern Front and was awarded the Order of Glory, 3rd class.

In 1988, Kobzev graduated from the Voronezh Higher Military Aviation Engineering School. From August 1988 to August 1989, he served as assistant chief of staff of the 936th separate battalion of aerodrome technical support of the 60th Anniversary of the USSR Syzran Higher Military Aviation School of Pilots, and then was assistant to the head of the personnel department of the school. Between February 1992 and December 1999, he served as head of the personnel department and combat unit of the 146th separate mobile mechanized civil defense brigade. In 1999, as part of the Territorial Administration of the Russian Emergencies Ministry, he took part in the Second Chechen War. And from December 1999 to August 2000, he was a senior assistant to the chief of staff for personnel and combat units of the 847th rescue center. Between August 2000 and December 2003, he held the post of head of the Department for Civil Defense and Emergencies of the Zheleznodorozhny District of Voronezh - Deputy Head of Civil Defense in Voronezh.

Kobzev graduated from Voronezh State University in 2001. From December 2003 to January 2005, he was assistant to the head of the Main Directorate (for the organization of the security service of the military and internal service). Between January 2005 and January 2008, he held the position of head of the personnel department, educational work, vocational training and psychological support. He graduated from the Voronezh Institute of Economics and Social Management in 2006. From January 2008 to May 2010, he held the post of First Deputy Head of the Main Directorate of the Russian Emergencies Ministry for the Voronezh Oblast. Between 2009 and 2012, he passed refresher courses at the Civil Defense Academy of the Ministry of Emergency Situations. From May 2010 to April 2016, he was the head of the Main Directorate of the Russian Emergencies Ministry in the Voronezh Oblast.

On 13 December 2012, Kobzev was promoted to Major General of the Internal Service.

From April 2016 to August 2017, he was the first deputy head of the Central Regional Center of the EMERCOM of Russia, and also served as the acting head of the Central Regional Center. In 2017, he graduated from the magistracy of the Academy of the State Fire Service of the Ministry of Emergencies of Russia. In August 2017, he took the post of Director of the HR Policy Department of the Ministry of Emergencies of Russia, and in August 2018, became Acting Deputy Minister of the Ministry of Emergencies of Russia.

On 12 December 2018, he was awarded the special rank of lieutenant general of the internal service.

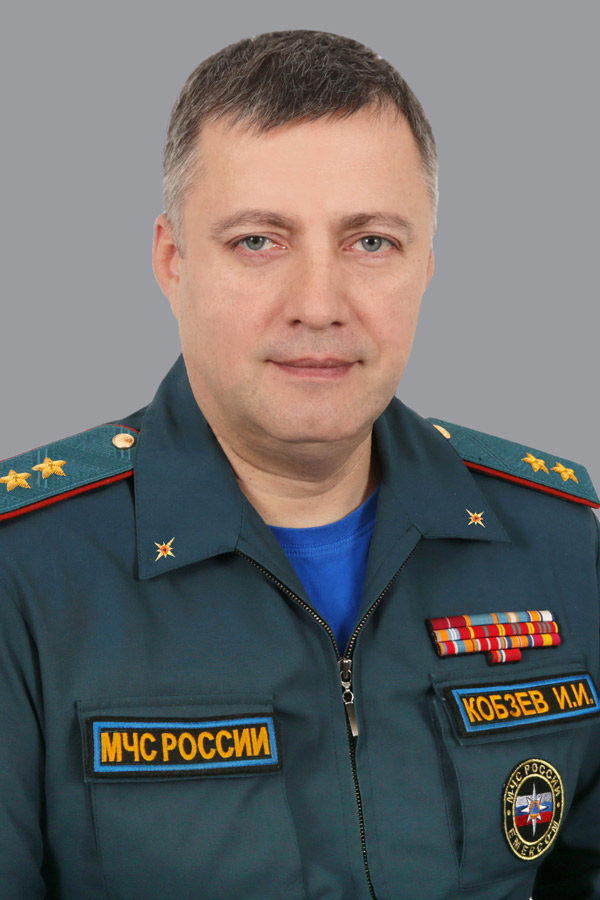
Kobzev as a lieutenant-general of the Internal Service

Kobzev was engaged in the resolution of a number of major emergencies, particularly in the consequences of the 2011 Garbuzovo Antonov An-148 crash in Belgorod Oblast, he participated in the dispatch of a convoy with humanitarian aid to the territory of South Ossetia during the Russian-Georgian War, took part in extinguishing natural fires in the Voronezh Oblast in 2018, led the operation to receive refugees from Ukraine in the Voronezh region in 2014, and dealt with the consequences of the Saratov Airlines Flight 703 crash in Moscow Oblast in 2018.

On 1 May 2019, he was appointed Deputy Minister of the EMERCOM of Russia - the chief state inspector of the Russian Federation for fire supervision. On November 4 of the same year, he was reappointed in the same position.

On 18 November 2019, Kobzev was included in the Heraldic Council under the President of the Russia.

On 12 December 2019, Kobzev was appointed the acting Governor of Irkutsk Oblast, following the resignation of Sergey Levchenko. After that, he attended a working meeting with Russian President Vladimir Putin, as well as with Prime Minister Dmitry Medvedev. The appointment was supported by the Minister of Emergency Situations Yevgeny Zinichev. On the same day, he was promoted to Colonel-General of Internal Service. As to Levchenko's departure from the post of governor, it had occurred against the backdrop of problems and confusion with dealing with the consequences of the 2019 floods in Irkutsk Oblast, the heaviest in the past 180 years.

You know, I don’t want to throw stones at the person [Levchenko] who has already left. He, of course, especially at the first stage of his work, tried and so on. But, of course, in these conditions, a specialist is needed who is well versed in the issues that need to be resolved. I think that the person we have now chosen, the Deputy Minister for Emergency Situations, will cope with this task, especially with the support of the federal center, which is allocating serious money for this.

— Vladimir Putin's interview with Channel 5 on 19 December 2019.

On 13 December, Kobzev was introduced by the plenipotentiary representative in the Siberian Federal District, Sergey Menyaylo, to members of the government and deputies of the Legislative Assembly of Irkutsk Oblast. Assessing the appointment, experts pointed out that in the future elections of the governor of the Irkutsk Oblast, Kobzev, as a typical "Varangian", may face competition from local elites.

On 20 May 2020, Kobzev announced that he had decided to participate as a self-nominated candidate in the 2020 Irkutsk gubernatorial election, which were scheduled for 13 September of the same year. The possibility of Kobzev winning the elections in the first round was assessed rather skeptically, despite the fact that he is a protégé of the federal center and enjoys the support of the Kremlin's political strategists. Nevertheless, Kobzev won 60% of the vote, ahead of the Communist Party candidate and State Duma deputy Mikhail Shchapov with 26%, against whom a "spoiler" with a surname close to confusion was put forward. The turnout in the Irkutsk elections was the lowest in Russia and amounted to about 32%. The inauguration ceremony of Kobzev took place on 18 September at a meeting of the Legislative Assembly of Irkutsk Oblast. On the same day, Kobzev was included in the subgroup in the direction of "Higher education" of the working group "Education and Science" as part of the State Council of Russia. On 23 September, he made a reshuffle in the government, in particular, he appointed Konstantin Zaitsev and Dmitry Berdnikov as his deputies.

On 26 October, Kobzev was hospitalized with coronavirus, and on 6 November, he was discharged from the hospital and continued to work.

Since 21 December 2020, Kobzev is a member of the Presidium of the State Council of Russia. He was reelected as governor in 2025.

== Personal life ==
=== Family ===
Kobzev is married and has four children.

=== Hobbies ===
Kobzev is fond of wrestling and swimming, loves to read fiction.

== Income ==
As of 2019, Kobzev declared an annual income of 10 million rubles, three land plots, one residential building, four apartments, two garages, two cars - a VAZ 21093 and a BMW X6, recorded in the name of his wife, who had no income.
