= Yevgeny Nazdratenko =

Russian politician (born 1949)

- Евгений Наздратенко
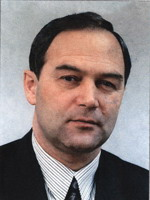

2nd Governor of Primorsky Krai
- In office May 24, 1993 – February 5, 2001
- Preceded by: Vladimir Kuznetsov
- Succeeded by: Valentin Dubinin/Igor Belchuk/Konstantin Tolstoshein (acting); Sergey Darkin

Personal details
- Born: February 16, 1949 (age 77) on board of a ship in the area of Severo-Kurilsk, Sakhalin Oblast, Russian SFSR, USSR
- Party: Communist Party (before 1991); Our Home – Russia (2005–2012); Civic Platform (since 2012)
- Education: Far Eastern Technological Institute

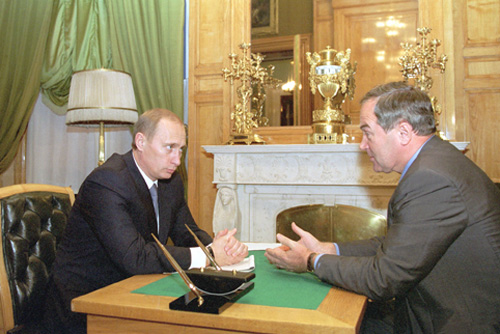
Yevgeny Nazdratenko with Vladimir Putin, 2000

Yevgeny Ivanovich Nazdratenko (Russian: Евге́ний Ива́нович Наздрате́нко; born February 16, 1949) is a Russian politician.

In 1983, he graduated from the Far Eastern Technological Institute where he specialized in economics.

Nazdratenko was a governor of Primorsky Krai from 1993 until his resignation on February 5, 2001, following a heart attack. It was speculated that he was forced to resign from his office, as he was blamed for an energy crisis.

Nazdratenko was appointed deputy secretary of the Security Council of Russia in 2003.

Nazdratenko is married and has two sons.

Preceded by Vladimir Sergeyevich Kuznetsov	Governor of Primorsky Krai; May 24, 1993–February 5, 2001	Succeeded by Konstantin Tolstoshein (acting)
