= Boris Govorin =

Russian diplomat (born 1947)

- Борис Говорин
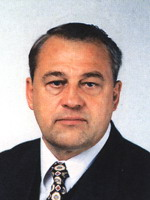

Ambassador of Russia to Mongolia
- In office 26 April 2006 – 21 September 2009
- President: Vladimir Putin; Dmitry Medvedev

2nd Governor of Irkutsk Oblast
- In office 21 August 1997 – 8 September 2005
- Preceded by: Yury Nozhikov
- Succeeded by: Alexander Tishanin

1st Mayor of Irkutsk
- In office 13 January 1992 – 21 August 1997
- Succeeded by: Vladimir Yakubovsky

Personal details
- Born: 27 June 1947 (age 78) Irkutsk, RSFSR, Soviet Union

Boris Alexandrovich Govorin (Russian: Борис Александрович Говорин; born 27 June 1947) is a Russian politician, former mayor of Irkutsk and Governor of Irkutsk Oblast.

== Biography ==
Boris Govorin was born in Irkutsk in 1947 to a family of WWII veteran. In 1971 he graduated from the Irkutsk Polytechnic Institute. He worked at Irkutskenergo, reaching the position of deputy director. In 1983 Govorin began his municipal career as deputy chairman and then chairman of executive committee in Irkutsk's Sverdlovsky borough.

In 1992 president of Russia Boris Yeltsin appointed Govorin head of Irkutsk city administration and two years later he was elected mayor. From 1995 to 1996 he was one of the nine representatives of Russia in the Chamber of Local Authorities of the Council of Europe.

In July 1997 Govorin was elected governor of Irkutsk Oblast, defeating Communist Sergey Levchenko. Govorin's predecessor Yury Nozhikov left him a "legacy" of a 40% stake in Irkutskenergo — it was managed by the Irkutsk Oblast administration and contested by the federal government since the early 1990s. As a result of a long multilateral conflict involving some of Russian oligarchs, it reduced to 15.5%, which spoiled the governor's approval ratings. In the 2001 election run-off Govorin was less than 2% ahead of Levchenko.

Govorin's hostility to the proposed unification of Irkutsk Oblast and Ust-Orda autonomy as well as his attempt to form a loyal majority of minor parties in the 2004 Legislative Assembly election has damaged perception of him in the Kremlin, and he was not re-appointed for a third term in 2005.

After his retirement as governor, Govorin served as a Russian ambassador to Mongolia in 2006–2009. He is married and has three daughters.
