= Alexander Tishanin =

Russian politician (born 1966)

- Александр Тишанин
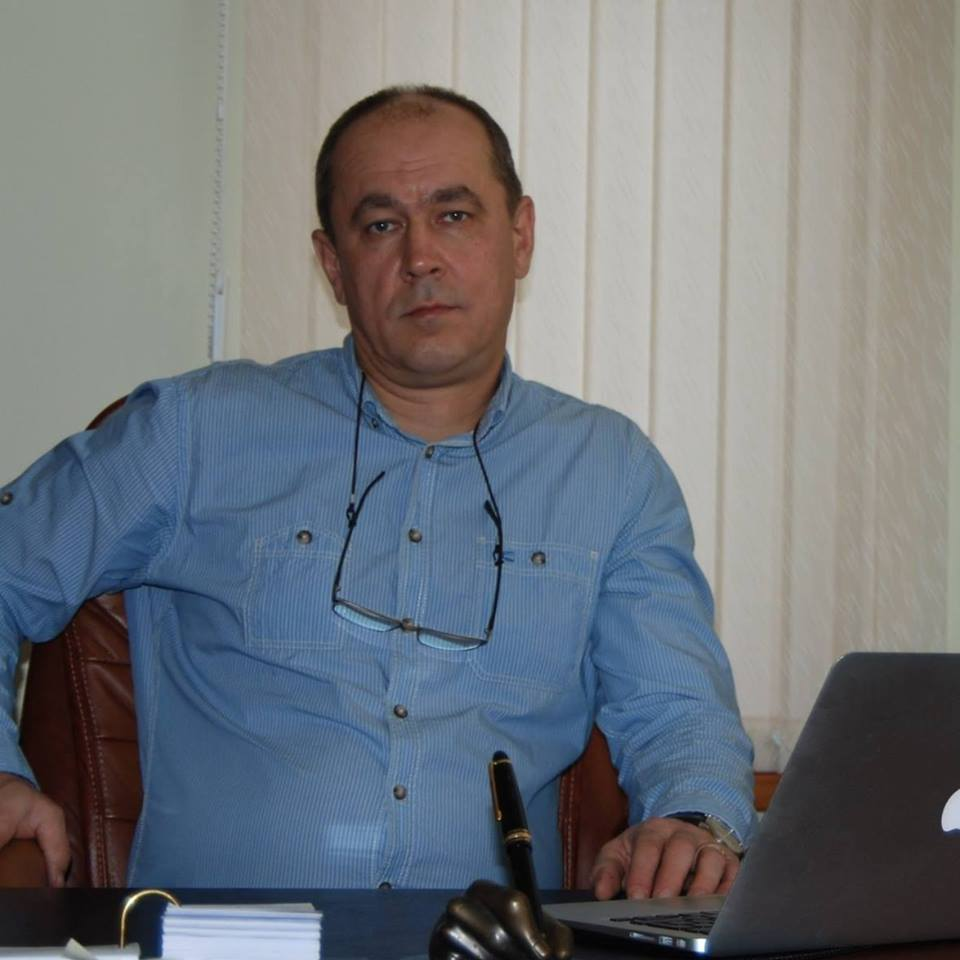
- Tishanin in 2016

3rd Governor of Irkutsk Oblast
- In office 8 September 2005 – 15 April 2008
- Preceded by: Boris Govorin
- Succeeded by: Igor Yesipovsky

Head of Ust-Orda Buryat AO Administration
- In office 26 January 2007 – 31 December 2007
- Preceded by: Valery Maleyev
- Succeeded by: Position abolished

Personal details
- Born: 20 April 1966 (age 58); Troitsk, Chelyabinsk Oblast, RSFSR, Soviet Union
- Political party: United Russia

Alexander Georgiyevich Tishanin (Russian: Александр Георгиевич Тишанин; born April 20, 1966) was the Head of the Administration of Ust-Orda Buryat Autonomous Okrug from January 26 to December 31, 2007 and the Governor of Irkutsk Oblast from September 8, 2005 to April 15, 2008.

Tishanin was appointed by Vladimir Putin. Tishanin was working as a manager before he became governor. He graduated from Chelyabinsk railways technical school, the Urals Engineering Institute of railway transport, and State Railways University.
