= 1994 Russian gubernatorial elections =

- 16 January – 30 June 1994

6 Heads of Federal Subjects from 89
- 1994 Russian regional elections: Gubernatorial Legislative Two legislative elections (including one of another subject) Gubernatorial and legislative Referendum, gubernatorial and legislative Referendum, gubernatorial and legislative (both of another subject)

Gubernatorial elections in 1994 took place in six regions of the Russian Federation. Chairmen of the Supreme Soviets of the four autonomous republics were elected presidents that year continuing the process of disbanding of the Soviets system, which began with dispersal of the Supreme Soviet of Russia in October 1993.

== Race summary ==
Federal subject	Leadership before election	Election day	Candidates	Result
North Ossetia	Akhsarbek Galazov, chairman of the Supreme Soviet; Sergey Khetagurov, premier	16 January	✓ Akhsarbek Galazov 64.04%; Sergey Khetagurov 32.62%	New president elected.
Ingushetia (snap election)	Ruslan Aushev, president	27 February	✓ Ruslan Aushev 91.70%; Bamatgirey Mankiyev 5.70%	Incumbent re-elected.
Irkutsk Oblast	Yury Nozhikov, appointed governor	27 March	✓ Yury Nozhikov 78.16%; Boris Alekseyev 7.96%	Incumbent elected for a full term.
Karelia	Viktor Stepanov, chairman of the Supreme Soviet; Sergey Blinnikov, premier	17 April	✓ Viktor Stepanov 68.57% (ran unopposed)	New premier elected.
Komi	Yury Spiridonov, chairman of the Supreme Soviet; Vyacheslav Khudyayev, premier	8 May	✓ Yury Spiridonov 50.98%; Vyacheslav Khudyayev 33.14%; Aleksandr Gladkov 8.39%	New head of the republic elected.
Buryatia	Leonid Potapov, chairman of the Supreme Soviet; Vladimir Saganov, premier	16 June (first round)	Leonid Potapov 46.21%; Aleksandr Ivanov 25.63%; Valery Shapovalov 15.75%; Sergey Namsarayev 7.97%	New president elected.
Buryatia	Leonid Potapov, chairman of the Supreme Soviet; Vladimir Saganov, premier	30 June (runoff)	✓ Leonid Potapov 71.71%; Aleksandr Ivanov 24.90%	New president elected.
Primorsky Krai	Yevgeny Nazdratenko, appointed governor	7 October	Yevgeny Nazdratenko; Vyacheslav Liforov; Aleksey Suvorov	Election cancelled (see 1995 elections).

== Sources ==
- Ivanov, Vitaly (2019). Глава субъекта Российской Федерации. История губернаторов [Head of the subject of the Russian Federation. History of governors] (in Russian). ISBN 978-5-907250-14-7.
- Kynev, Aleksandr (2020). Губернаторы в России: между выборами и назначениями [Governors in Russia: Between Elections and Appointments] (in Russian). ISBN 978-5-903135-68-4.
