= Mikhail Shchapov =

Russian politician

- Михаил Щапов
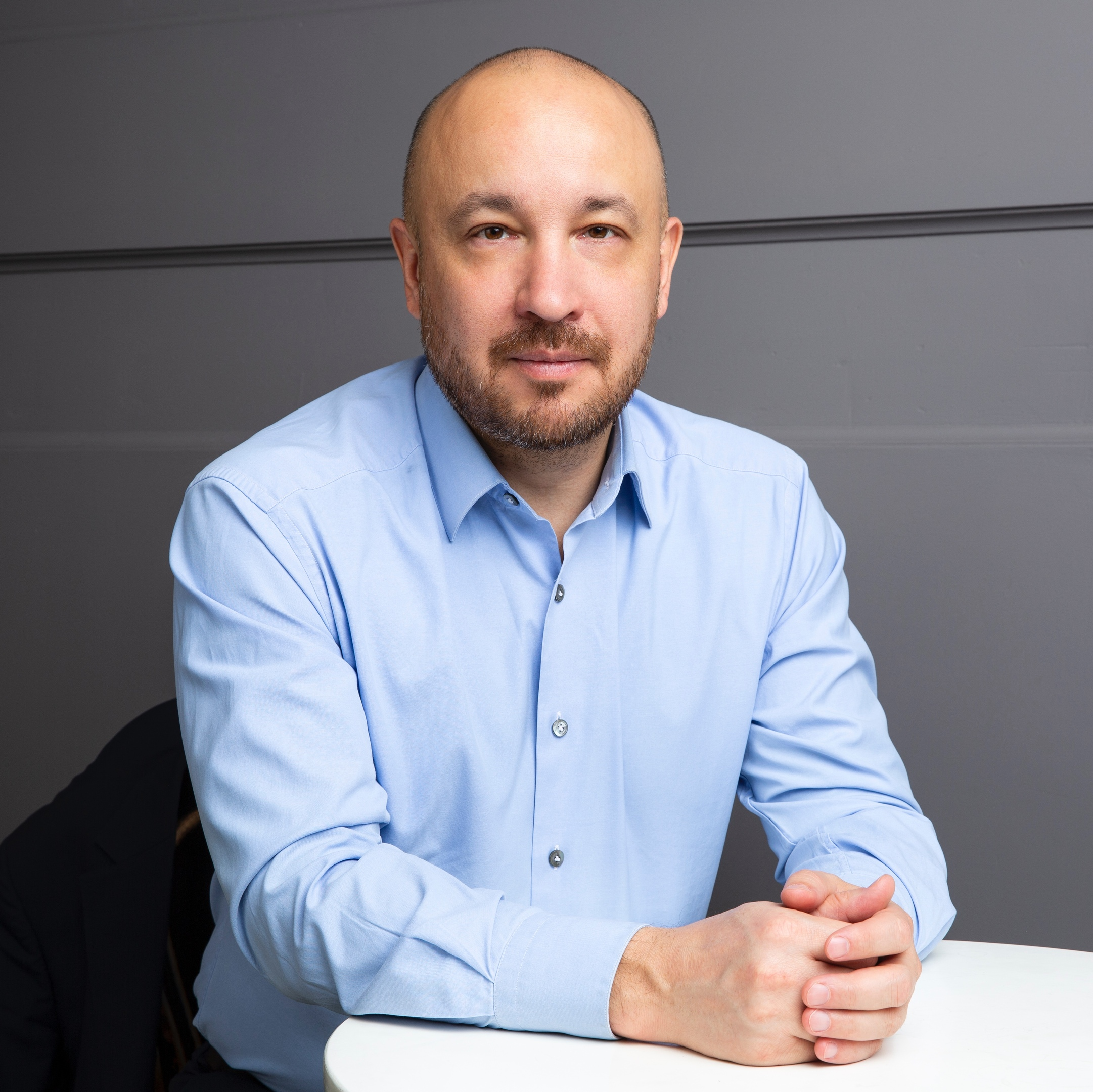

Member of the State Duma for Irkutsk Oblast
- Incumbent
- Assumed office 5 October 2016
- Preceded by: constituency re-established
- Constituency: Irkutsk (No. 93)

Personal details
- Born: 20 September 1975 (age 51) Kirensk, Irkutsk Oblast, Russian SFSR, USSR
- Party: Communist Party of the Russian Federation
- Children: 4
- Education: Russian State University of Trade and Economics (B.Sc); Institute of the FSB in Novosibirsk; Irkutsk State University; RANEPA (MBA)
- Website: mv-schapov.ru

Military service
- Allegiance: (Russia) Russian Federation
- Branch/service: Federal Security Service
- Years of service: 1999-2010
- Rank: Lieutenant Colonel

Mikhail Victorovich Shchapov (Russian: Михаил Викторович Щапов; born 20 September 1975, Kirensk, Irkutsk Oblast) is a Russian political figure, FSB Lieutenant colonel, and a deputy of the 7th and 8th State Dumas.

At the beginning of the 2000s, Shchapov served at the Federal Security Service. In 2010, he retired from the service and engaged in business. In 2011, he co-founded the agricultural enterprise AgroBaikal. From 2013 to 2016, he was the deputy of the Legislative Assembly of Irkutsk Oblast of the 2nd convocation. In 2016 and 2021, he was elected deputy of the 7th and 8th State Dumas, respectively.

== Sanctions ==
He was sanctioned by the UK government in 2022 in relation to the Russo-Ukrainian War.
