= Sergei Brilka =

Russian politician (born 1954)

- Сергей Брилка
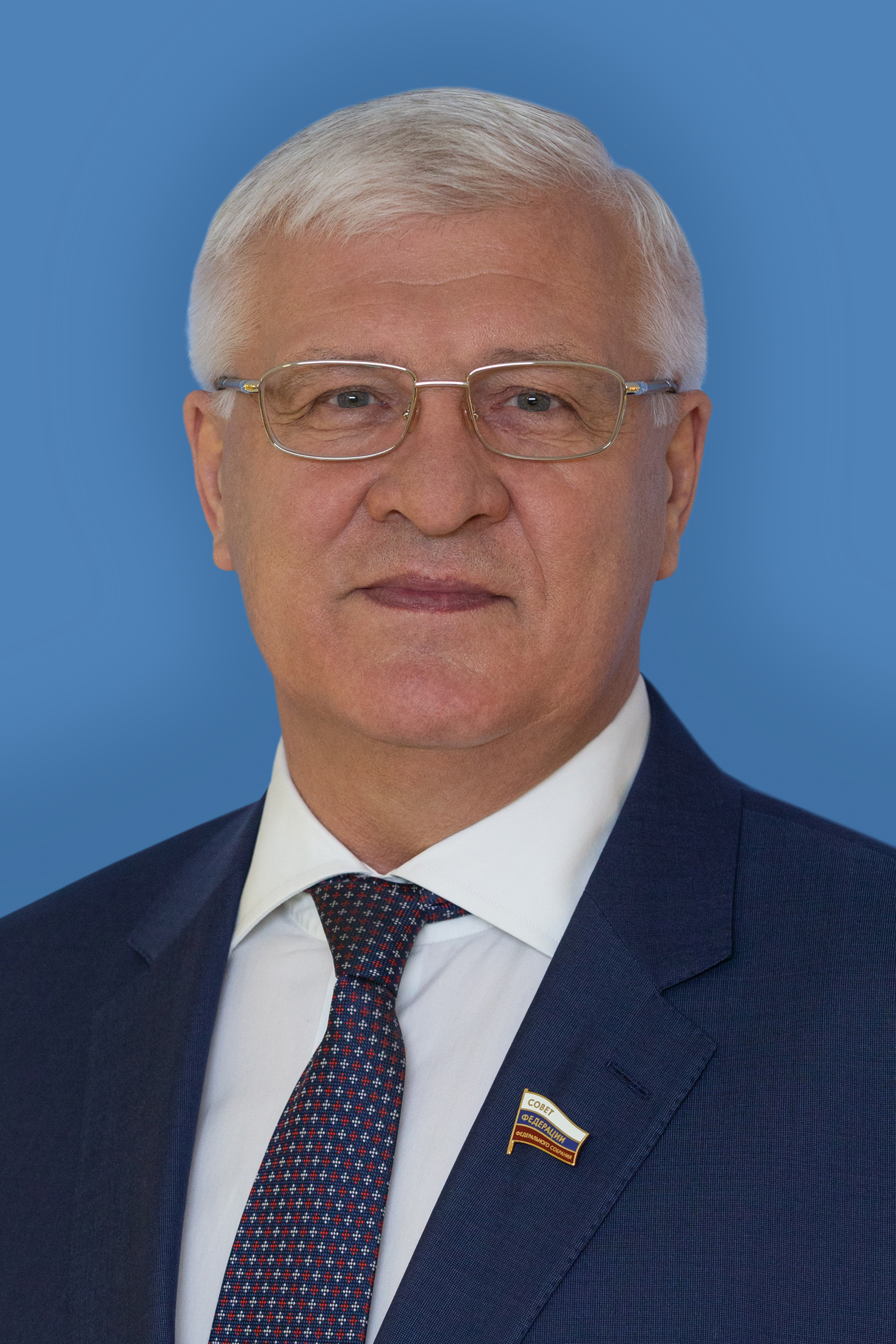

Senator from Irkutsk Oblast
- Incumbent
- Assumed office 20 September 2018
- Preceded by: Vitaly Shuba

Personal details
- Born: Sergei Brilka; 14 March 1954 (age 72) Irkutsk Oblast, Russian Soviet Federative Socialist Republic, Soviet Union
- Party: United Russia
- Education: Irkutsk Institute of National Economy

Sergei Fateyevich Brilka (Russian: Сергей Фатеевич Брилка; born 14 March 1954) is a Russian politician serving as a senator from Irkutsk Oblast since 20 September 2018.

== Biography ==
Sergei Brilka was born on 14 March 1954 in Irkutsk Oblast. In 1976, he graduated from the Irkutsk Institute of National Economy. In 2011, he also received a degree from Irkutsk National Research Technical University. Starting in 1977, Sergei Brilka worked as an engineer. From 1982 to 1997, he was the department head at the Irkutskzhilstroy. He left his job to become Deputy Governor of the Irkutsk Region for Architecture, Construction, Housing Policy and Northern Affairs. In 2003 he was appointed Deputy General Director for Capital Construction at the IrkAZ-SUAL branch of the SUAL Group. On 4 December 2012, he was elected secretary of the Irkutsk brunch of the United Russia party. From 2015 to 2018, he was also the deputy of the Legislative Assembly of Irkutsk Oblast of the 3rd convocation. On 19 September 2018, he became senator from the Legislative Assembly of Irkutsk Oblast.

== Sanctions ==
Sergei Brilka is under personal sanctions introduced by the European Union, the United Kingdom, the USA, Canada, Switzerland, Australia, Ukraine, New Zealand, for ratifying the decisions of the "Treaty of Friendship, Cooperation and Mutual Assistance between the Russian Federation and the Donetsk People's Republic and between the Russian Federation and the Luhansk People's Republic" and providing political and economic support for Russia's annexation of Ukrainian territories.
