= Khrebtovaya =

Khrebtovaya Хребтовая
- Urban-type settlement
- Interactive map of Khrebtovaya
- Location of Khrebtovaya Khrebtovaya (Irkutsk Oblast)
- Coordinates: 56.7090°N 104.2487°E
- Country: Russia
- Federal subject: Irkutsk Oblast
- Administrative district: Nizhneilimsky District
- Elevation: 607 m (1,991 ft)

Population (2010 Census)
  - Total: 1,502
  - Estimate (2021): 1,037 (−31%)
- Time zone: UTC+8 (MSK+5)
- Postal code: 665683
- OKTMO ID: 25626165051

Khrebtovaya (Russian: Хребтовая) is an urban locality (an urban-type settlement) in Nizhneilimsky District of Irkutsk Oblast, Russia. Population: 1,502 (2010 census); 2,071 (2002 census); 3,029 (1989 Soviet census).
