= Vladimir Kuznetsov (politician) =

Russian statesman and politician

- Владимир Кузнецов
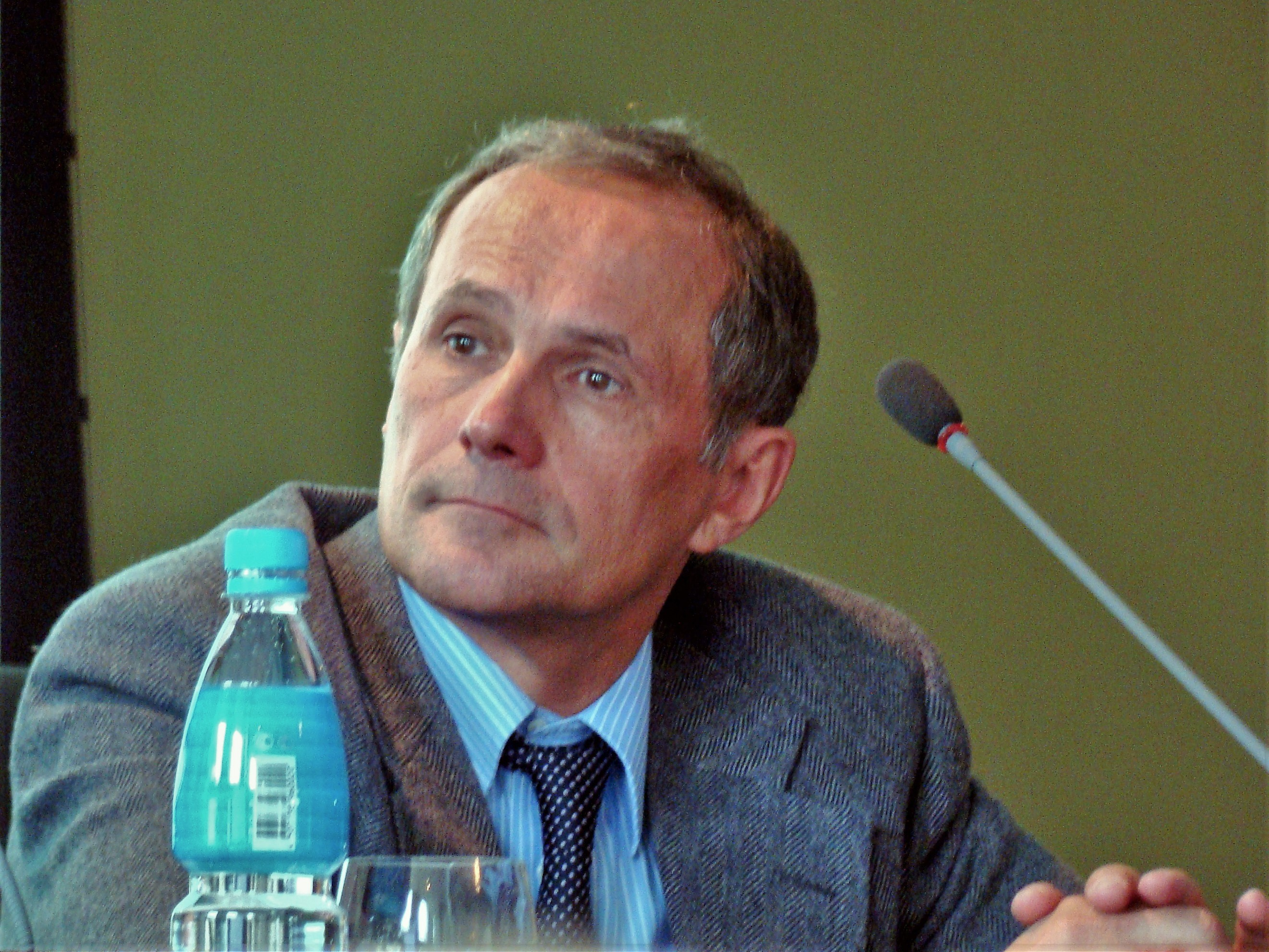
- Kuznetsov in 2011

Consul General of Russia in San Francisco
- In office 1993–1997
- Preceded by: Yury Savostyanov
- Succeeded by: Yury Popov

1st Head of Primorsky Krai Administration
- In office 8 October 1991 – 23 May 1993
- Succeeded by: Yevgeny Nazdratenko

Personal details
- Born: Vladimir Sergeyevich Kuznetsov; 6 January 1954 (age 72) Adler, Sochi, Krasnodar Krai, RSFSR, Soviet Union

Vladimir Sergeyevich Kuznetsov (Russian: Владимир Сергеевич Кузнецов; born on 6 January 1954), is a Russian statesman and politician. He served as the 1st Governor (Head) of Primorsky Krai from 1991 to 1993.

== Early life ==
Vladimir Kuznetsov was born on 6 January 1954.

From 1969 to 1973, he was a student of the A.A. Andreyev Moscow College of Railway Transport.

== Career ==
He held a variety of military, academic, political, and diplomatic positions, while returning for continuing studies.

From 1973-1976, he served in the Pacific Fleet of the Soviet Navy. He was a member of the CPSU and a party activist.

From 1976 to 1981, he was a student of the Moscow State Institute of International Relations of the Ministry of Foreign Affairs of the Soviet Union.

From 1981 to 1982, he was a researcher at the Electron Research Institute in Moscow.

From 1982 to 1983, he was a lecturer at the Moscow Power Engineering College of the Ministry of Energy. In 1983, he became a senior researcher at the Vladivostok Branch of the Institute for Economic Research of the Far Eastern Branch of the Academy of Sciences.

From 1983 to 1987, he was a postgraduate student specialised in international economics at the Institute of World Economy and International Relations of the USSR Academy of Sciences.

From 1987 to 1990, he was a researcher, and the deputy director of the Institute of Economic and International Problems of Ocean Development of the Far Eastern Branch of the USSR Academy of Sciences.

From 1990 to 1991, he was the Chairman of the executive committee of the Primorsky Regional Council of People's Deputies.

On 8 October 1991, Kuznestov became the first Governor (Head) of Primorsky Krai. As a young liberal economist, he came up with a "Greater Vladivostok" blueprint for the development of the region, which failed due to lack of funds and political support. He resigned on 23 May 1993 after being offered a diplomatic post by Kremlin.

Between 1993 and 1997, Kuznetsov was the Consul General of Russia in San Francisco.

In 1995, Kuznetsov unsuccessfully ran for the State Duma on the federal list from the Beer Lovers Party.

In 2002, Kuznestov ran for the State Duma, but was not elected.

From 2002 to 2007, he was a professor of the Far Eastern State University.

From 2007 to 2011, Kuznetsov was an advisor to the President of Chuvashia.

Between 2011 and 2014, he was the Director of the FEFU School of Regional and International Studies. In 2013, he headed the Public Expert Council for attracting investments to the Primorsky Krai

From 2015 to 2016, he taught political science at FEFU.

== Family ==
Kuznetsov had a daughter and son with his wife Valeria. Kuznetsov also has a son with his domestic partner, Vera.
