= Igor Belchuk =

Russian politician and businessman

- Игорь Бельчук

Governor of Primorsky Krai (acting)
- In office 27 April 2001 – 7 May 2001
- Preceded by: Valentin Dubinin (acting)
- Succeeded by: Konstantin Tolstoshein (acting)

Vice Governor of Primorsky Krai
- In office 1993 – April 2001

Personal details
- Born: Igor Lvovich Belchuk; 15 May 1947 (age 77); Soviet Union

Igor Lvovich Belchuk (Russian: Игорь Львович Бельчук; born on 15 May 1947), is a Russian politician and businessman who had served as the acting Governor of Primorsky Krai in spring 2001.

He had been the Vice Governor of Primorsky Krai from 1993 to 2001. He has been the Director of the Far Eastern Regional Directorate of PJSC Promsvyazbank, since 2003.

He is a corresponding member of the Russian Academy of Engineering.

== Biography ==
Igor Belchuk was born on 15 May 1947, in the family of civil engineers, his father, Lev Alexandrovich, and his mother, Regina Solomonovna, née Rzhevskaya. During his school years he was engaged in wrestling and worked in the workshops of Dalzavod. He graduated from the Faculty of Civil Engineering FEPI, and then worked at a construction site. After that, he became interested in building science and worked at the Far Eastern Research, Design and Technological Institute for Construction.

In 1990, he was elected director of the Soyuzdalgiproris Institute, and three years later he joined the team of the new governor of Primorsky Krai, Yevgeny Nazdratenko, as hiz vice-governor. At the post, he oversaw the construction, road facilities, transport and activities of nine seaports.

In April 2001, Belchuk became the acting governor of Primorsky Krai. He resigned on 7 May, and was replaced by Konstantin Tolstoshein.

Since 2003, he has been the head of the regional directorate of OJSC Promsvyazbank.
