= Konstantin Tolstoshein =

Russian politician

- Константин Толстошеин

Governor of Primorsky Krai (acting)
- In office 7 May 2001 – 25 June 2001
- Preceded by: Igor Belchuk (acting)
- Succeeded by: Sergey Darkin

Mayor of Vladivostok
- In office 14 December 1994 – 14 April 1996
- Preceded by: Viktor Cherepkov
- Succeeded by: Viktor Cherepkov
- In office 16 March 1994 – 29 November 1994
- Preceded by: Viktor Cherepkov
- Succeeded by: Viktor Cherepkov

Personal details
- Born: Konstantin Borisovich Tostoshein; 9 March 1952 (age 73) Artyom, Soviet Union
- Party: Independent

Konstantin Borisovich Tostoshein (Russian: Константин Борисович Толстошеин; born on 9 March 1952) is a Russian politician who had served as the acting governor of Primorsky Krai in 2001.

He also served as two non-consecutive terms as the mayor of Vladivostok, first in 1994, and the second term from 1994 to 1996.

== Biography ==
Konstantin Tolstoshein was born on 9 March 1952 in Artyom, Primorsky Krai. His father, Boris Prokopevich, is a mining engineer, while his mother, Maria Borisovna is a doctor.

In 1975, he graduated from the Far Eastern Polytechnic Institute with a degree in mining engineering.

On 16 March 1994, Tolstoshein became the mayor of Vladivostok, when incumbent mayor Viktor Cherepkov was removed from office on a stretcher, accused of accepting bribes, who refused to leave his workplace, with the support of OMON and under the guns of photo and television cameras of the media. After that, Tolstoshein worked for more than two years as the acting head of the city administration.

After Cherepkov's triumphant return to the mayor's office, Tolstoshein returned under the wing of his patron, namely, he became vice-governor in the administration of Yevgeny Nazdratenko. He was later promoted at as the first vice governor of Primorsky Krai in the early 2001.

On 7 May 2001, Tolstoshein became the acting governor of Primorsky Krai. He served for 20 days until being officially replaced by Sergey Darkin.

By the time Tolstoshein served his term as acting governor, after briefly leading the Vladivostok water utility, media speculated that he retired and disappeared from politics. The last time the Russian media saw Tolstoshein was in Moscow Oblast, where the former mayor of Vladivostok settled in the middle of the 2000s. According to the media, he bought a cottage there and a small candle or mayonnaise factory.
