= Viktor Cherepkov =

Russian politician and naval officer

- Виктор Черепков
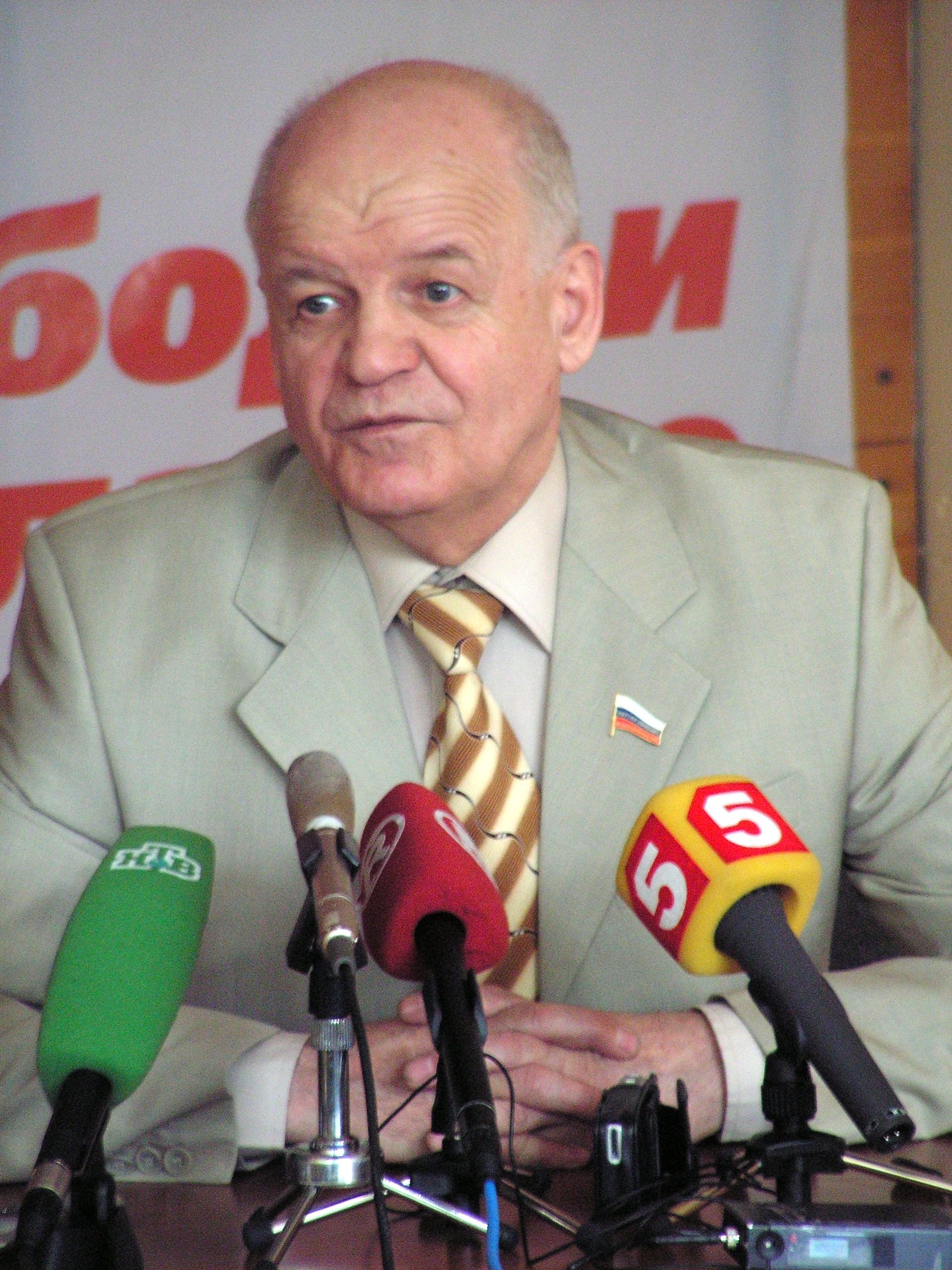
- Cherepkov in 2015

Mayor of Vladivostok
- In office 26 June 1993 – 16 March 1994
- Preceded by: Vladimir Yefremov
- Succeeded by: Konstantin Tolstoshein
- In office 24 September 1996 – 11 December 1998
- Preceded by: Konstantin Tolstoshein
- Succeeded by: Yury Kopylov

Personal details
- Born: Viktor Ivanovich Cherepkov; 16 April 1942 Kazinka, Skopinsky District, Ryazan Oblast, USSR
- Died: 2 September 2017 (aged 75) Moscow, Russia
- Education: Pacific Higher Naval School

Military service
- Allegiance: Soviet Union→Russia
- Branch/service: Soviet Navy→Russian Navy
- Years of service: 1967–1993
- Rank: Captain 1st rank

Viktor Ivanovich Cherepkov (Russian: Виктор Иванович Черепков; 16 April 1942 – 2 September 2017) was a Russian naval officer and politician who was a Deputy of the State Duma of the third and fourth convocation. He was mayor of Vladivostok (1993–1994; 1996–1998).

== Biography ==
=== Naval career ===
He graduated from the railway technical school and the Pacific Higher Naval School.

From 1967 to 1993, Cherepkov served in the Pacific Fleet of the Soviet and Russian Navy. Cherepkov left the Navy as a Captain 1st rank.

=== Political career ===
In 1990, Cherepkov was elected as a deputy to the council for Primorsky Krai.

In 1993, Cherepkov became the mayor of Vladivostok.

One year into his term, Cherepkov was accused of accepting bribes and was suspended from his duties as mayor. He blockaded himself his office at the city hall, which resulted in the OMON having to storm the building.

Although the local prosecutor dropped the charges against Cherepkov in November 1994, Russian president Boris Yeltsin signed an executive order removing him from his post.

He regained the mayorship in 1996 after the State Duma passed a resolution declaring his removal from office illegal. President Yeltsin later issued an order to restore Cherepkov in September 1996. Cherepkov's return to office lasted only two years with Yeltsin reversing course and suspending the mayor again in November 1998.

Cherepkov was elected to the city council of Vladivostok in January 1999, but had his election overturned by a local court only three months later.

In 2000, Cherepkov won a seat in the State Duma. He was re-elected in 2004.

In December 2011, Cherepkov announced the intention to run for President of Russia in the 2012 elections. Although he was nominated as a candidate for the election, he refused to turn in the required two million signatures in order to become registered by election officials.

In 2013, Cherepkov attempted to regain his former post as mayor with the Green Alliance Party. He finished second in that race.

=== Death ===
Cherepkov died of cancer on the morning of 2 September 2017 in the Central Clinical Hospital of Moscow. According to his will, he was buried in Vladivostok.
