= Sergey Levchenko =

Russian politician

Sergey Levchenko MP
- Сергей Левченко
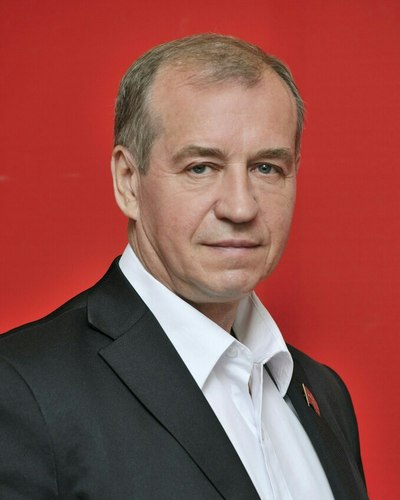

Member of the State Duma (Party List Seat)
- In office 12 October 2021 – 30 September 2026
- In office 24 December 2007 – 13 October 2015
- Succeeded by: Vladimir Primachek
- In office 18 January 2000 – 29 December 2003

7th Governor of Irkutsk Oblast
- In office 2 October 2015 – 12 December 2019
- Preceded by: Sergey Yeroshchenko
- Succeeded by: Igor Kobzev

Deputy of the Legislative Assembly of Irkutsk Oblast
- In office 1994–1999
- In office 2004–2007

Personal details
- Born: 2 November 1953 (age 72) Novosibirsk, RSFSR, USSR
- Party: CPRF
- Education: Novosibirsk Civil Engineering Institute; Academy of Social Sciences
- Occupation: construction foreman

Military service
- Allegiance: Russian Federation
- Branch/service: Reserves
- Rank: Lieutenant Colonel

Sergey Georgievich Levchenko (Russian Cyrillic: Сергей Георгиевич Левченко, born 2 November 1953) is a Russian politician and member of the 8th State Duma. He served as the Governor of Irkutsk Oblast from 2015 to 2019. Previously, he was a deputy in the Russian State Duma from 2000 to 2015.

== Biography ==
Sergey Levchenko was born on 2 November 1953 in Novosibirsk, Soviet Union. He graduated from the Novosibirsk State University of Architecture and Construction in 1976. He started his career in the Krasnoyarsk division of Stalkonstruktsiya, part of the Soviet Ministry of Installation and Special Construction Works. In 1982, he moved to a similar department in Angarsk.

In 1987, he began working for the Communist Party of the Soviet Union, on a district committee in Angarsk and, by 1991, rose to the First Secretary of the local party administration.

After the fall of the Soviet Union, he rejoined StahlKonstruktsiya as general director. He was elected to the first session of the Irkutsk Oblast legislative assembly. He ran for oblast governor in 1997; but took only 18.8% of the vote against Boris Govorin.

In 1999, he was elected to the State Duma as a member of the Communist Party. He made a second run for Governor against Govorin in 2001, taking 23.9% to advance to the runoff election where he was defeated. He continued working in both the federal and oblast dumas for several years.

In 2015, he made a third run for the post of governor, this time taking on Sergey Eroschenko, who was acting governor at the time. He won the race with 57.4% of the votes.

In 2019, he resigned as governor according to a press release although news sources such as the BBC reported that he was dismissed. He was succeeded by Igor Kobzev.

== Controversies ==
There had been speculation in the press about Levchenko possible dismissal since devastating floods affected Irkutsk Oblast in the summer of 2019. President Vladimir Putin and senior administration officials criticized Levchenko’s response to the flooding in which 25 people died.

In October 2019, Russian media reported that Levchenko had participated in the illegal hunting of a bear. A criminal case was initiated in connection with this incident.

According to media reports, Levchenko owns an undeclared mansion near Irkutsk.

== Family ==
Former wife: Lyudmila Ivanovna Levchenko (née Arestova), born on April 30, 1954, in Gorno-Altaysk. She holds a higher education degree and graduated in 1976 from the Novosibirsk Institute of Civil Engineering. As of 2016, she was retired. Before retirement, she worked at the Municipal Architectural and Construction Oversight Department (Gorarkhstroynadzor) under the administration of the city of Angarsk, Irkutsk Oblast.

Wife: Natalya Yakovlevna Levchenko (previously Solovyova from her first marriage), born on May 10, 1958. As of 2016, she was the General Director of Diana Insurance Company (CJSC) in Angarsk, Irkutsk Oblast.

Daughter: Tatyana Sergeyevna Morduyeva (née Levchenko), born on February 9, 1977, in Krasnoyarsk. As of 2016, she was the Director of Salyut Publishing Center LLC, which also fulfilled print orders for the Irkutsk regional branch of the Communist Party of the Russian Federation (CPRF).

Son: Andrey Sergeyevich Levchenko, born on August 14, 1982, in Krasnoyarsk. He holds a higher education degree and graduated in 2004 from the Faculty of Industrial and Civil Engineering of the Moscow State University of Civil Engineering. After graduation, he worked as a site foreman and construction supervisor at Stalkonstruktsiya CJSC in Irkutsk. As of 2016, he was the Director of IrkutskStalkonstruktsiya LLC.

Adopted daughter: Yana Alexandrovna Solovyova, born on March 15, 1983, in Angarsk, Irkutsk Oblast. She holds a higher education degree and graduated in 2005 from the Faculty of Finance and Credit of the Financial Academy under the Government of the Russian Federation. As of 2016, she was employed at PricewaterhouseCoopers Audit CJSC.

Adopted daughter: Elena Alexandrovna Solovyova, born on April 3, 1987, in Angarsk, Irkutsk Oblast.

== Sanctions ==
Following the Russian invasion of Ukraine, he has been placed under sanctions by the European Union, the United States, Canada, the United Kingdom, Switzerland, Australia, Japan, Ukraine, and New Zealand.
