= Sergey Mikhaylovich Darkin =

Russian politician (born 1963)

Sergey Darkin
- Сергей Дарькин
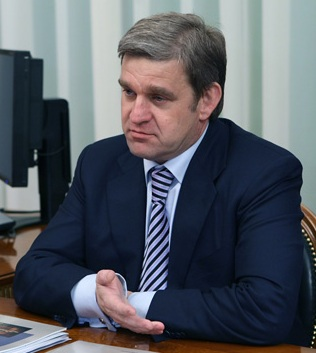
- Darkin in 2009

Governor of Primorsky Krai
- In office 25 June 2001 – 16 March 2012
- Preceded by: Konstantin Tolstoshein
- Succeeded by: Vladimir Miklushevsky

Personal details
- Born: Sergey Mikhaylovich Darkin; 9 December 1963 (age 61) Bolshoy Kamen, Primorsky Krai, RSFSR, Soviet Union

Sergey Mikhaylovich Darkin (Russian: Серге‌й Миха‌йлович Да‌рькин; born December 9, 1963) is a Russian businessman, ex-governor of Primorsky Krai (from 2001 to 2012) and former deputy minister of Regional Development of Russia.

== Biography ==
Sergey Darkin was born on December 9, 1963, in Bolshoy Kamen, Primorsky Krai. He attended schools in Artyom and Vesyoly Yar. He graduated with honors as a specialist in marine transportation from the Far Eastern Naval College (1985) and continued with post-graduate education on the economics of marine transportation. He also received a degree in Finance from the Far Eastern Academy of Business (1999).

In the 1980s, Darkin worked in the Port of Vladivostok as a dockworker. In 1989, he became the deputy manager of the Dallizing leasing company. In 1991, he founded the Roliz company, which focused on shipbuilding and fishing. In the late 1990s, he founded or controlled a number of companies in Primorsky Krai. In 1998, he became the president of Primorye bank.

== Politics ==
In 2001, Darkin was elected the governor of Primorsky Krai. In 2005, the president Vladimir Putin reassigned him to this position. He was awarded the Governor of the Year of the Russian National Olymp competition. In 2007, he was elected deputy to the local parliament as the leading candidate in the United Russia's list but refused the mandate. He was reassigned as the governor by the president Dmitry Medvedev in 2010 and resigned in 2012.

== Entrepreneurship ==
In 2011, Darkin sold Roliz to Karat Fishing Holding but retained control over Nakhodka active marine fishing base (NBAMR). By 2020, it became one of the largest fishing companies in Russia. In 2014, he founded the Pacific Investment Group, which combined numerous business initiatives in Primorsky Krai, from oil terminals to jewelry production.

== Publications ==
Darkin wrote several books, such as The Pacific Russia: strategy, economics, security. He also led the work on the Strategy of social and economic development of Primorsky Krai (2004—2010) and the Strategic Priorities of the Development of the Far East report (2015).

== Family ==
Sergey Darkin is married to actress Larisa Belobrova (by 2010, the co-owner of Primorie bank). He has three daughters (including the daughter from his first marriage).
