= Legislative Assembly of Irkutsk Oblast =

Regional parliament of Irkutsk Oblast, Russia

Legislative Assembly of Irkutsk Oblast Законодательное собрание Иркутской области
- 4th legislature

Type
- Type: Unicameral

Leadership
- Chairman: Aleksandr Vedernikov, United Russia since 17 March 2020

Structure
- Seats: 45
- Political groups: United Russia (35) CPRF (4); LDPR (2); New People (2) SRZP (2)

Elections
- Voting system: Mixed
- Last election: 8 September 2023
- Next election: 2028

Meeting place
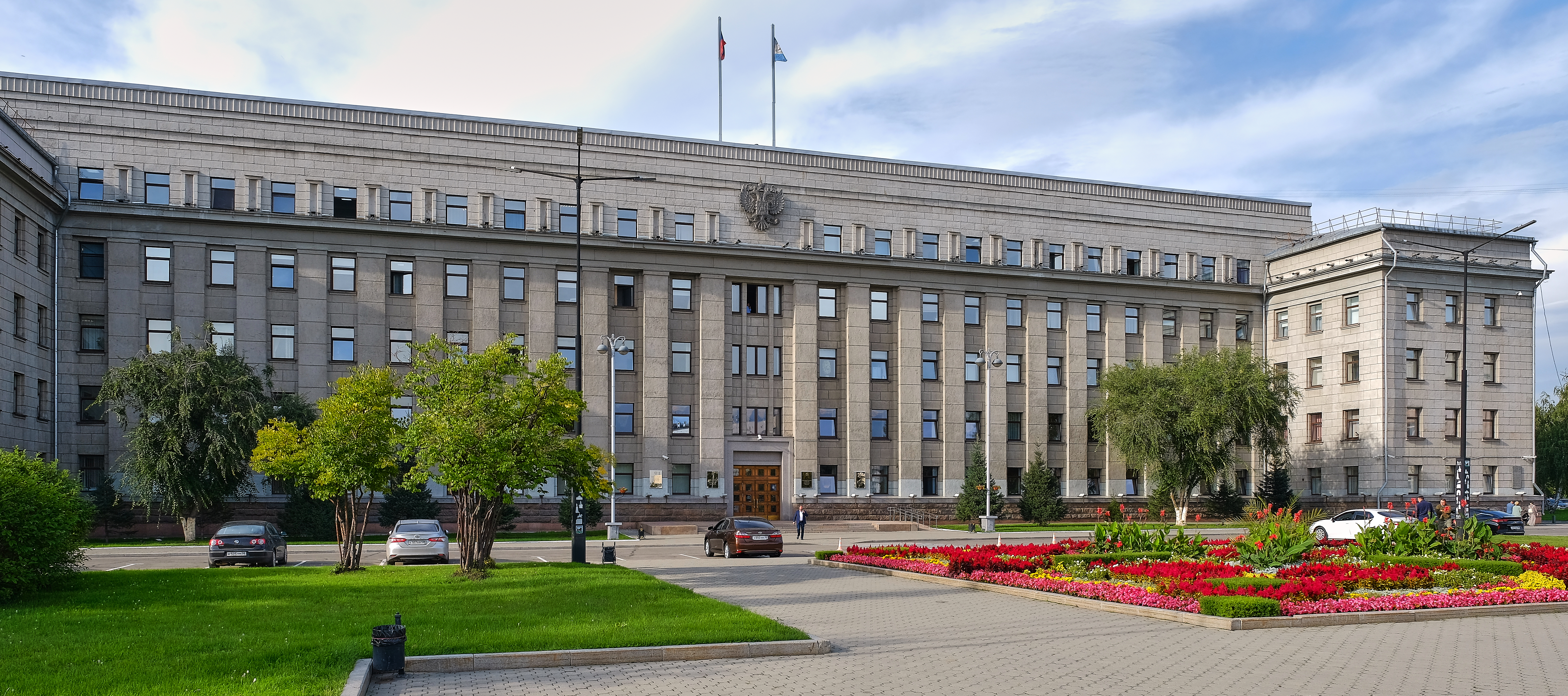
- 1 Lenin Street, Irkutsk

Website
- irk.gov.ru

The Legislative Assembly of Irkutsk Oblast (Russian: Законодательное собрание Иркутской области, romanized: Zakonodatel'noe sobranie Irkutskoy oblasti) is the regional parliament of Irkutsk Oblast, a federal subject of Russia. A total of 45 deputies are elected for five-year terms.

== Elections ==
=== 2018 ===
Party	%	Seats
Communist Party of the Russian Federation	33.94	18
United Russia	27.83	17
Liberal Democratic Party of Russia	15.80	4
A Just Russia — For Truth	9.46	3
Civic Platform	4.75	3
Russian Party of Freedom and Justice	4.84	0
Rodina	1.32	0
Registered voters/turnout	26.33	

=== 2023 ===
Party	%	Seats
United Russia	54.6	35
Communist Party of the Russian Federation	15.47	4
Liberal Democratic Party of Russia	9.62	2
New People	7.34	2
A Just Russia — For Truth	7.06	2
Russian Party of Freedom and Justice	1.33	0
Civic Platform	0.98	0
Registered voters/turnout	24.22	
