= Opinion polling for the 2021 Russian legislative election =

In the run up to the 2021 Russian legislative election, various organisations carried out opinion polling to gauge voting intention in Russia. The results of these polls are displayed in this article. Polls were conducted only for the 225 seats elected on the party list. Another 225 deputies are elected directly in single member constituencies, where the party can obtain a completely different result.

The date range for these opinion polls are from the 2016 Russian legislative election, held on 18 September, until mid-September 2021.

== Graphical summary ==
United Russia CPRF LDPR SRZP New People

== Campaign polls ==
Polls conducted after the election is called.

Fieldwork date	Polling firm	UR	CPRF	LDPR	SRZP	CR	Yabloko	RPPSJ	Rodina	PG	Greens	CP	RPFJ	NP	GA	Undecided	Abstention	Lead
17–19 September 2021	Election result	49.82%	18.93%	7.55%	7.46%	1.27%	1.34%	2.45%	0.80%	0.52%	0.91%	0.15%	0.77%	5.32%	0.64%			30.89%
19 September	WCIOM	28.8%	17.1%	7.3%	6.3%	11.1%								6.7%	–	13.6%	7.7%	11.7%
12 September	WCIOM	29.0%	16.0%	8.1%	6.3%	13.0%								4.9%	–	13.6%	7.5%	13.0%
9 September	CIPKR	26%	22%	7%	5%	1%	4%	4%	12%					6%	0%	12%	14%	4%
9 September	INSOMAR	30.1%	14.9%	9.6%	6.3%	0.9%	2.9%	3.2%	1.2%	0.4%	2.3%	0.2%	0.8%	4.2%	0.5%	12.0%	8.5%	15.2%
8 September	WCIOM	29.4%	16.5%	10.0%	5.5%	0.4%	2.1%	3.1%	0.9%	0.5%	2.2%	0.04%	0.8%	5.2%	0.3%	8.0%	13.4%	12.9%
5 September	WCIOM	29.3%	16.6%	7.8%	6.1%	12.2%								3.8%	–	14.0%	8.3%	12.7%
5 September	FOM	29%	14%	11%	5%	1%	1%	3%	1%	0%	1%	0%	1%	3%	0%	10%	19%	15%
5 September	NMCPSM	34.9%	19.0%	12.1%	12.6%	21.5%												15.9%
1 September	WCIOM	34%	18%	10%	7%	0.3%	2.2%	2.7%	1.0%	0.7%	2.1%	0.2%	1.8%	2.8%	0.2%	–	16%	16%
29 August	FOM	30%	15%	10%	5%	0%	1%	1%	1%	0%	1%	0%	1%	3%	0%	14%	17%	15%
29 August	WCIOM	28.3%	17.5%	8.7%	6.6%	15.5%										13.3%	8.5%	10.8%
25 August	WCIOM	30%	16%	9%	7%	12%										8%	12%	14%
22 August	FOM	27%	13%	11%	6%	0%	1%	1%	0%	0%	1%	0%	1%	2%	0%	15%	18%	14%
15 August	WCIOM	27.3%	16.4%	9.1%	6.7%	14.9%										14.6%	9.2%	10.9%
15 August	FOM	30%	13%	10%	6%	1%	1%	1%	0%	0%	0%	0%	0%	2%	1%	13%	19%	17%
9-13 August	CIPKR	25%	19%	8%	6%	1%	2%	5%	–	–	–	–	–	4%	0%	?	14%	6%
8 August	FOM	29%	11%	9%	6%	1%	1%	1%	1%	0%	0%	0%	0%	2%	1%	14%	21%	18%
1 August	FOM	27%	11%	9%	6%	1%	1%	1%	1%	0%	0%	0%	0%	2%	0%	17%	22%	16%
1 August	WCIOM	27.8%	15.6%	9.6%	6.7%	13.3%										14.2%	10.5%	12.2%
30 July	NMCPSM	35.6%	16.2%	13.6%	9.4%	25.2%												19.4%
25 July	FOM	29%	12%	10%	6%	1%	1%	1%	0%	0%	0%	0%	1%	3%	0%	15%	19%	17%
25 July	WCIOM	28.7%	14.1%	10.3%	7.2%	14.0%										13.1%	10.3%	14.6%
18 July	FOM	31%	12%	11%	7%	1%	1%	1%	0%	0%	0%	0%	1%	3%	0%	12%	18%	19%
18 July	WCIOM	27.7%	14.1%	10.6%	7.2%	13.4%										14.4%	10.4%	13.6%
11 July	FOM	31%	11%	10%	6%	1%	1%	1%	0%	0%	0%	0%	1%	2%	0%	15%	19%	20%
11 July	WCIOM	28.3%	13.6%	10.5%	7.0%	13.4%										14.2%	11%	14.7%
8-11 July	WCIOM	28.0%	13.0%	11.0%	7.0%	1.3%	3.8%	3.0%	0.3%	0.3%	2.1%	0.3%	0.7%	3.1%	0.2%	10.0%	14.0%	15%
5-6 July	WCIOM	28.0%	11.0%	11.0%	6.0%	1.2%	1.3%	2.2%	1.0%	0.5%	1.0%	0.1%	1.0%	2.6%	0.6%	15.0%	16.0%	17%
4 July	FOM	30%	11%	10%	7%	6%										17%	18%	19%
4 July	WCIOM	28.7%	14.0%	10.9%	7.2%	13.0%										13.6%	10.7%	14.7%
27-29 June	CIPKR	25%	16%	8%	9%	1%	4%	6%	–	–	–	–	–	1%	0%	23%		9%
18 September 2016	Election result	54.20%	13.34%	13.14%	6.81% (Note: Including the result of A Just Russia — 6.22% and Patriots of Russia — 0.59%)	2.27%	1.99%	1.73%	1.51%	1.29%	0.76%	0.22%	DNP	New	New			40.64%

== Constituency polls ==
=== Kuntsevo constituency (No. 197) ===
Fieldwork date	Polling firm	Popov UR	Lobanov CPRF	Ramensky LDPR	Tarnavsky SRZP	Mitina CR	Goncharov Yabloko	Sobolev Rodina	Menshikov PG	Others	Undecided	Abstention	Lead
13 September 2021	Russian Field	39.9%	20.1%	—	—	—	12.3%	—	—	—	27.2%	15.3%	19.8%
10 August 2021	Russian Field	37.9%	20.1%	5.3%	2%	4.3%	12.3%	3%	3%	12.1%	—	—	17.8%
18 September 2016	Election result	29.52%	15.17%	8.83%	7.72% (Note: Only A Just Russia)	DNP	13.12%	8.17%	5.36%	6.97%			14.35%

=== Leningradsky constituency (No. 198) ===
Fieldwork date	Polling firm	Zvyagintsev CPRF	Vlasov LDPR	Khovanskaya SRZP	Balabutkin CR	Litvinovich Yabloko	Andrianova Greens	Katayev RPFJ	Tarbaev NP	Goluyenko GA	Bryukhanova Independent	Melnikov Independent	Undecided	Abstention	Lead
13 September 2021	Russian Field	12.8%	—	20.8%	—	13.9%	—				28.1%	—	26.1%	19.0%	7.3%
13 September 2021	WCIOM	8%	3%	18%	2%	12%	2%	1%	2%	0%	10%	1%	15%	22%	6%
18 September 2016	Election result	11.89%	11.99%	31.09%	2.55%	13.99%	2.57%	DNP	New	New	DNP	DNP			17.1%

=== Preobrazhensky constituency (No. 205) ===
Fieldwork date	Polling firm	UR	Obukhov CPRF	Popova Yabloko	Wasserman Independent	Others	Undecided	Abstention	Lead
13 September 2021	Russian Field	DNP	20.9%	16.9%	41.9%	—	52.2%	14.9%	21.0%
18 September 2016	Election result	34.8%	10.5%	10.3%	19.9%	24.5%			14.9%

=== Moscow Central constituency (No. 208) ===
Fieldwork date	Polling firm	UR	Ostanina CPRF	Mitrokhin Yabloko	Shevchenko RPFJ	Leonov Independent	Others	Undecided	Abstention	Lead
13 September 2021	Russian Field	DNP	12.2%	19.9%	12.2%	21.0%	—	34.4%	18.9%	1.1%
18 September 2016	Election result	34.25%	12.86%	DNP	DNP	DNP	50.07%			22.1%

== Seat projection ==
=== All seats ===
Projections for all 450 seats.

Fieldwork date	Polling firm	UR	CPRF	LDPR	SRZP	CR	Yabloko	RPPSJ	Rodina	PG	Greens	CP	RPFJ	NP	GA	Independent	Lead
9 September	CPK	292–306	67–70	39–42	25–28	1	1–2	1	1–2	1	0	1	0	0	0	3–5	222–239
3 September	CPK	299–306	71–73	38–40	26–28	1	2–3	1	1–2	0–1	0	0	0	0	0	2	226–235
27 August	CPK	293–305	64–68	43–46	31–33	1	2–3	1	1–2	0–1	0	0	0	0	0	2	225–241
20 August	CPK	300	67	41	32	1	3	1	2	1	0	0	0	0	0	2	233
19 August	CPK	305	62	40	33	1	3	1	2	1	0	0	0	0	0	2	243
18 September 2016	Election result	343	42	39	23	0	0	0	1	0	0	1	DNP	New	New	1	301

=== Party lists ===
Projections for 225 out of 450 seats, elected by party lists.

Fieldwork date	Polling firm	UR	CPRF	LDPR	SRZP	CR	Yabloko	RPPSJ	Rodina	PG	Greens	CP	RPFJ	NP	GA	Lead
13 September	WCIOM (FPP)	102	48	28	19	0	0	13	0	0	0	0	0	15	0	54
13 September	WCIOM (FPP)	109	51	30	21	0	0	0	0	0	0	0	0	14	0	58
13 September	WCIOM (FPP)	117	55	31	22	0	0	0	0	0	0	0	0	0	0	62
9 September	CIPKR	89	75	24	17	0	0	0	0	0	0	0	0	20	0	14
3 September	FOM (CPK)	113	56	37	19	0	0	0	0	0	0	0	0	0	0	57
27 August	FOM (CPK)	107	51	43	24	0	0	0	0	0	0	0	0	0	0	56
20 August	FOM (CPK)	114	50	38	23	0	0	0	0	0	0	0	0	0	0	64
9-13 August	CIPKR	88	67	28	21	0	0	21	0	0	0	0	0	0	0	21
6–8 August	FOM (CPK)	119	45	37	24	0	0	0	0	0	0	0	0	0	0	74
23-25 July	FOM (CPK)	115	47	39	24	0	0	0	0	0	0	0	0	0	0	68
16-18 July	FOM (CPK)	114	44	41	26	0	0	0	0	0	0	0	0	0	0	70
9-11 July	FOM (CPK)	120	43	39	23	0	0	0	0	0	0	0	0	0	0	77
2-4 July	FOM (CPK)	116	43	39	27	0	0	0	0	0	0	0	0	0	0	73
27-29 June	CIPKR	88	56	28	32	0	0	21	0	0	0	0	0	0	0	32
24-27 June	FOM (CPK)	107	48	41	29	0	0	0	0	0	0	0	0	0	0	59
18-20 June	FOM (CPK)	114	43	39	29	0	0	0	0	0	0	0	0	0	0	71
11-13 June	FOM (CPK)	120	41	38	26	0	0	0	0	0	0	0	0	0	0	79
18 September 2016	Election result	140	35	34	16	0	0	0	0	0	0	0	DNP	New	New	105

=== Single-member constituencies ===
Projections for 225 out of 450 seats, elected by Single-member constituencies.

Fieldwork date	Polling firm	UR	CPRF	LDPR	SRZP	CR	Yabloko	RPPSJ	Rodina	PG	Greens	CP	RPFJ	NP	GA	Independent	Lead
20 August	CPK	186	17	3	9	1	3	1	2	1	0	0	0	0	0	2	169
19 August	APEC	189-198	7-11	4-5	7-9	0	0-1	0	1	1	0	1	0	0	0	5-6	178-191
18 September 2016	Election result	203	7	5	7	0	0	DNP	1	0	0	1	DNP	New	New	1	196

== Pre-campaign polls ==
Opinion polls conducted prior to the campaign and the announcement of the list of participating parties. Parties with more than 5% support of the whole electorate (enough to enter State Duma while not adjusting for likely voters) are given in bold.

=== 2021 ===
Fieldwork date	Polling firm	UR	CPRF	LDPR	SRZP (Note: A Just Russia (JR) before 22 February 2021)	Others	Undecided	Abstention	Lead
27 June	FOM	29%	13%	11%	**8%**	7%	16%	15%	16%
27 June	WCIOM	28.7%	13.9%	10.7%	**7.1%**	13.4%	12.9%	11.2%	14.8%
20 June	FOM	32%	12%	11%	**8%**	8%	17%	11%	20%
20 June	WCIOM	30.4%	11.9%	10.0%	**7.8%**	13.4%	13.7%	10.7%	18.5%
13 June	FOM	32%	11%	10%	**7%**	8%	17%	14%	21%
13 June	WCIOM	30.5%	12.0%	10.4%	**7.7%**	13.0%	13.5%	10.7%	18.5%
6 June	FOM	31%	10%	10%	**6%**	7%	16%	17%	21%
6 June	WCIOM	30.6%	12.7%	10.8%	**7.6%**	13.1%	12.9%	10%	17.9%
31 May	CIPKR	31%	12%	10%	**8%**	29%		-	19%
30 May	FOM	32%	11%	11%	**8%**	6%	16%	14%	21%
30 May	WCIOM	29.7%	13.2%	10.2%	**7.3%**	12.8%	14.1%	10.7%	16.5%
23 May	FOM	33%	13%	11%	**8%**	7%	17%	10%	20%
23 May	WCIOM	29.5%	12.7%	10.2%	**7.8%**	13.4%	13.5%	10.7%	16.8%
16 May	FOM	31%	12%	11%	**7%**	7%	17%	13%	19%
16 May	WCIOM	30.4%	12.1%	10.5%	**7.7%**	11.5%	14.9%	10.9%	18.3%
8 May	FOM	30%	11%	11%	**7%**	7%	17%	16%	19%
8 May	WCIOM	29.6%	12.2%	10.7%	**7.4%**	13.1%	14.2%	10.6%	17.4%
2 May	WCIOM	30.5%	12.2%	11.2%	**7.1%**	12.8%	13.9%	10.2%	18.3%
25 April	FOM	33%	12%	10%	**7%**	6%	18%	13%	21%
25 April	WCIOM	30.0%	12.2%	10.3%	**7.4%**	13.1%	14.9%	9.9%	17.8%
24 April	**Gennady Zyuganov is re-elected as the leader of the Communist Party**								
18 April	FOM	32%	13%	11%	**8%**	8%	18%	9%	19%
18 April	WCIOM	29.1%	12.9%	10.3%	**7.6%**	13.2%	14.4%	10.2%	16.2%
11 April	FOM	32%	12%	10%	**7%**	7%	17%	12%	20%
11 April	WCIOM	29.4%	13.0%	10.7%	**7.7%**	12.4%	14.5%	10.2%	16.4%
4 April	FOM	31%	12%	9%	**7%**	6%	16%	16%	19%
4 April	WCIOM	29.2%	12.7%	10.2%	**7.9%**	13.2%	14.6%	10.2%	16.5%
28 March	FOM	31%	12%	11%	**7%**	7%	17%	13%	19%
28 March	WCIOM	30.3%	12.4%	10.3%	**6.9%**	12.9%	15.0%	10.1%	17.9%
22 March	Insomar	33%	16%	9%	**8%**	25%		-	17%
21 March	FOM	31%	12%	11%	**8%**	8%	18%	10%	19%
21 March	WCIOM	29.3%	12.6%	10.3%	**8.0%**	13.6%	14.7%	9.6%	16.7%
14 March	FOM	31%	13%	10%	**7%**	8%	18%	12%	18%
14 March	WCIOM	28.7%	12.5%	10.8%	**7.3%**	14.4%	14.5%	10.1%	16.2%
7 March	FOM	31%	12%	9%	**6%**	6%	17%	16%	19%
7 March	WCIOM	30.3%	12.3%	10.8%	**8.2%**	12.2%	14.0%	10.2%	18.0%
28 February	FOM	32%	12%	9%	**6%**	7%	18%	15%	20%
28 February	WCIOM	29.4%	12.4%	10.1%	**8.4%**	12.9%	14.7%	10.3%	17.0%
24 February	Levada Center	27%	10%	12%	**5%**	8%	15%	21%	15%
22 February	**Sergey Mironov is elected as the leader of the A Just Russia — Patriots — For Truth**								
21 February	FOM	30%	13%	10%	**7%**	7%	19%	11%	17%
21 February	WCIOM	29.8%	12.2%	10.2%	**7.1%**	13.7%	14.9%	10.2%	17.6%
14 February	FOM	30%	12%	10%	**7%**	8%	20%	11%	18%
14 February	WCIOM	30.2%	11.6%	10.8%	**7.4%**	12.3%	15.4%	10.1%	18.6%
7 February	FOM	29%	10%	9%	**6%**	7%	18%	18%	19%
7 February	WCIOM	31.0%	11.1%	9.6%	**6.6%**	13.5%	16.2%	10.1%	19.9%
31 January	FOM	31%	10%	9%	**7%**	7%	20%	15%	21%
31 January	WCIOM	30.9%	11.2%	10.6%	**6.2%**	12.9%	15.9%	10.4%	19.7%
24 January	FOM	32%	11%	11%	**6%**	7%	19%	12%	21%
24 January	WCIOM	30.6%	11.9%	10.9%	**7.0%**	12.7%	14.7%	10.5%	18.7%
20 January	**Sergey Mironov announced the merger of A Just Russia, Patriots of Russia and For Truth parties.**								
17 January	FOM	32%	12%	13%	**5%**	7%	18%	12%	19%
17 January	WCIOM	31.0%	13.0%	11.9%	**6.6%**	13.2%	13.4%	9.4%	18%
10 January	FOM	28%	12%	11%	4%	16%	17%	10%	16%
18 September 2016	Election result	54.20%	13.34%	13.14%	**6.81%** (Note: Including the results of A Just Russia — 6.22% and Patriots of Russia — 0.59%)	7.51%			40.86%

=== 2020 ===
Fieldwork date	Polling firm	UR	CPRF	LDPR	JR	Others	Undecided	Abstention	Lead
30 December	WCIOM	30.5%	13.0%	12.0%	**7.3%**	13.1%	12.6%	9.9%	17.5%
20 December	WCIOM	31.1%	13.1%	11.7%	**6.2%**	12.8%	13.8%	9.7%	18.0%
20 December	FOM	31%	12%	12%	**6%**	19%	14%	5%	19%
14 December	**Vladimir Zhirinovsky is re-elected as the leader of the Liberal Democratic Party**								
13 December	WCIOM	30.1%	13.4%	12.1%	**7.0%**	12.8%	13.3%	9.7%	16.7%
13 December	FOM	30%	12%	11%	**5%**	17%	15%	8%	18%
6 December	WCIOM	30.2%	13.2%	12.7%	**6.4%**	13.7%	13.3%	8.9%	17.0%
6 December	FOM	28%	12%	10%	**5%**	15%	17%	10%	16%
29 November	WCIOM	29.9%	13.2%	13.1%	**6.6%**	12.6%	13.2%	9.7%	16.7%
29 November	FOM	29%	13%	10%	**6%**	16%	17%	7%	16%
26 November	Levada Center	29%	7%	11%	**5%**	11%	12%	22%	18%
22 November	WCIOM	30.8%	13.0%	12.3%	**6.8%**	13.5%	12.7%	9.4%	17.8%
22 November	FOM	30%	13%	11%	**6%**	17%	16%	5%	17%
15 November	WCIOM	31.0%	13.2%	11.7%	**6.6%**	13.0%	13.4%	9.3%	17.8%
15 November	FOM	31%	12%	10%	**6%**	15%	19%	7%	19%
8 November	WCIOM	31.6%	12.9%	11.5%	**6.5%**	13.4%	12.4%	10.1%	18.7%
8 November	FOM	30%	12%	9%	**5%**	15%	18%	9%	18%
1 November	WCIOM	31.5%	13.0%	11.8%	**6.4%**	13.2%	12.9%	9.6%	18.5%
1 November	FOM	30%	13%	10%	**6%**	16%	16%	8%	17%
25 October	WCIOM	31.3%	13.1%	11.8%	**6.2%**	13.9%	13.0%	9.2%	18.2%
25 October	FOM	31%	13%	11%	**6%**	16%	16%	6%	18%
18 October	WCIOM	31.8%	13.1%	11.4%	**6.8%**	12.7%	13.0%	9.8%	18.7%
18 October	FOM	31%	12%	10%	**5%**	15%	18%	8%	19%
11 October	WCIOM	33.1%	12.7%	11.0%	**6.9%**	11.8%	12.7%	10.1%	20.4%
11 October	FOM	30%	11%	10%	**5%**	14%	18%	10%	19%
4 October	WCIOM	33.0%	12.9%	11.2%	**6.4%**	12.8%	12.6%	9.7%	20.1%
4 October	FOM	31%	12%	10%	**5%**	15%	17%	8%	19%
27 September	WCIOM	32.4%	13.3%	11.5%	**6.7%**	12.7%	13.0%	8.8%	19.1%
27 September	FOM	31%	13%	11%	**6%**	17%	16%	5%	18%
20 September	WCIOM	31.7%	14.1%	11.6%	**6.7%**	13.4%	11.7%	9.4%	17.6%
20 September	FOM	30%	13%	10%	**5%**	16%	17%	7%	17%
13 September	**Gubernatorial elections in 20 Federal Subjects (14 UR, 5 independent and 1 LDPR)**								
13 September	**Regional elections in 11 Federal Subjects (all won UR)**								
13 September	**By-elections in 4 constituencies (3 UR and 1 JR)**								
13 September	WCIOM	31.5%	13.5%	10.7%	**6.0%**	13.1%	14.1%	9.6%	18.0%
13 September	FOM	30%	12%	9%	**5%**	14%	19%	9%	18%
6 September	WCIOM	31.5%	12.8%	11.7%	**6.4%**	12.7%	14.0%	9.3%	18.7%
6 September	FOM	31%	12%	9%	**5%**	13%	20%	9%	19%
30 August	WCIOM	31.6%	13.2%	11.5%	**6.0%**	12.5%	14.1%	9.3%	18.4%
30 August	FOM	31%	12%	10%	**5%**	15%	19%	7%	19%
26 August	Levada Center	31%	7%	11%	3%	10%	11%	22%	20%
23 August	WCIOM	31.7%	13.0%	12.2%	**6.1%**	12.3%	14.3%	8.8%	18.7%
23 August	FOM	30%	13%	10%	**5%**	18%	17%	5%	18%
16 August	WCIOM	30.5%	13.0%	11.4%	**5.8%**	12.8%	15.3%	9.6%	17.5%
16 August	FOM	30%	12%	10%	**5%**	17%	18%	7%	18%
9 August	WCIOM	31.9%	13.0%	11.4%	**6.0%**	11.8%	14.0%	10.4%	18.9%
9 August	FOM	30%	11%	11%	**5%**	14%	19%	9%	19%
2 August	WCIOM	31.6%	13.0%	11.8%	**6.0%**	12.2%	14.0%	9.7%	18.6%
2 August	FOM	29%	12%	12%	**5%**	15%	18%	7%	17%
26 July	WCIOM	32.4%	13.0%	12.5%	**5.6%**	12.1%	13.8%	9.1%	19.4%
26 July	FOM	31%	13%	13%	**6%**	12%	20%	4%	18%
19 July	WCIOM	32.0%	12.6%	12.8%	**5.8%**	12.5%	14.3%	8.7%	19.2%
19 July	FOM	32%	12%	12%	**5%**	10%	21%	6%	20%
12 July	WCIOM	33.9%	11.8%	11.2%	**6.2%**	12.3%	14.4%	8.8%	22.1%
12 July	FOM	32%	11%	9%	**5%**	13%	22%	8%	21%
5 July	WCIOM	33.3%	12.5%	10.3%	**6.0%**	12.7%	15.4%	8.6%	20.8%
5 July	FOM	33%	11%	10%	**5%**	9%	23%	7%	22%
1 July	**Constitutional referendum: 78.5% of voters vote in favour amendments to the Constitution**								
28 June	WCIOM	36.1%	12.6%	10.5%	**5.3%**	11.9%	14.4%	7.9%	23.5%
28 June	FOM	35%	12%	11%	**6%**	11%	20%	4%	23%
21 June	WCIOM	33.4%	13.0%	11.2%	**6.2%**	11.3%	15.0%	8.7%	20.4%
21 June	FOM	33%	12%	10%	**5%**	14%	18%	5%	21%
14 June	WCIOM	33.0%	13.1%	10.7%	**5.8%**	11.4%	15.6%	8.8%	19.9%
14 June	FOM	32%	13%	9%	4%	12%	20%	7%	19%
7 June	WCIOM	32.2%	14.3%	11.0%	**5.9%**	10.9%	15.2%	8.1%	17.9%
7 June	FOM	31%	12%	9%	3%	13%	22%	9%	19%
31 May	WCIOM	33.4%	14.2%	11.1%	**5.9%**	11.6%	14.7%	8.0%	19.2%
31 May	FOM	31%	11%	10%	4%	14%	20%	8%	20%
24 May	WCIOM	33.9%	14.5%	11.5%	**5.4%**	10.7%	13.9%	8.1%	19.4%
24 May	FOM	33%	13%	11%	**5%**	15%	18%	5%	20%
17 May	WCIOM	33.8%	14.3%	10.7%	**5.5%**	10.9%	14.7%	8.7%	19.5%
17 May	FOM	31%	13%	10%	**5%**	14%	20%	7%	18%
10 May	WCIOM	33.8%	14.5%	9.9%	**5.8%**	10.2%	15.0%	9.1%	19.3%
10 May	FOM	30%	12%	9%	4%	12%	22%	10%	18%
3 May	WCIOM	33.5%	13.9%	11.4%	**5.8%**	10.9%	15.0%	7.9%	19.6%
26 April	FOM	33%	13%	10%	**5%**	14%	19%	5%	20%
26 April	WCIOM	33.0%	13.7%	11.0%	**5.9%**	10.8%	15.4%	8.6%	19.3%
26 April	CIPKR	31%	12%	9%	4%	20%	11%	13%	19%
19 April	WCIOM	34.0%	14.1%	10.7%	**5.7%**	9.8%	15.8%	8.4%	19.9%
19 April	FOM	34%	12%	9%	**5%**	12%	20%	8%	22%
12 April	WCIOM	34.3%	13.2%	10.3%	**5.9%**	9.6%	16.3%	8.7%	21.1%
12 April	FOM	32%	10%	8%	4%	10%	24%	9%	22%
5 April	WCIOM	36.0%	12.8%	9.6%	**5.6%**	10.1%	16.7%	7.8%	23.2%
5 April	FOM	34%	11%	8%	4%	12%	23%	7%	23%
2 April	CIPKR	38%	11%	9%	4%	17%	12%	9%	27%
29 March	WCIOM	34.7%	13.5%	10.9%	**5.2%**	10.3%	16.0%	7.7%	21.2%
29 March	FOM	37%	12%	9%	4%	14%	19%	5%	25%
22 March	WCIOM	32.5%	14.2%	11.5%	**5.7%**	10.8%	15.0%	8.4%	18.3%
22 March	FOM	35%	13%	12%	**5%**	13%	23%		22%
15 March	WCIOM	33.0%	13.6%	11.4%	**6.1%**	11.2%	14.1%	8.9%	19.4%
15 March	FOM	33%	9%	9%	4%	7%	20%	16%	24%
10 March	**President Vladimir Putin supported the amendment to the Constitution to reset the terms of the President of Russia and plans to hold snap legislative election were scrapped**								
7 March	CIPKR	34%	16%	10%	**5%**	21%	7%	7%	18%
7 March	FOM	32%	9%	10%	4%	7%	19%	17%	22%
7 March	WCIOM	32.9%	14.8%	11.4%	**6.0%**	10.6%	14.9%	8.1%	18.1%
1 March	FOM	31%	10%	10%	**5%**	8%	20%	14%	21%
1 March	WCIOM	32.3%	14.8%	11.4%	**6.0%**	11.6%	14.2%	8.1%	17.5%
26 February	Levada Centre	28	8%	10%	3%	11%	13%	23%	18%
23 February	FOM	32%	11%	11%	**5%**	9%	20%	10%	21%
22 February	WCIOM	33.0%	14.9%	12.2%	**6.3%**	10.8%	12.7%	8.6%	18.1%
16 February	WCIOM	32.7%	14.8%	11.4%	**6.4%**	11.2%	12.9%	8.9%	17.9%
16 February	FOM	32%	10%	12%	**5%**	8%	20%	12%	20%
9 February	WCIOM	33.2%	14.5%	12.0%	**6.0%**	10.8%	13.3%	8.6%	18.7%
9 February	FOM	31%	11%	12%	4%	8%	20%	11%	19%
2 February	WCIOM	32.5%	14.8%	11.5%	**6.6%**	10.3%	13.3%	8.4%	17.7%
2 February	FOM	31%	11%	12%	4%	8%	21%	10%	19%
26 January	WCIOM	34.2%	15.5%	11.8%	**6.3%**	10.4%	12.7%	7.8%	18.7%
26 January	FOM	32%	11%	12%	**5%**	9%	19%	10%	20%
19 January	WCIOM	32.6%	15.1%	12.5%	**6.1%**	10.7%	13.0%	8.7%	17.5%
19 January	FOM	33%	12%	12%	4%	10%	16%	12%	21%
16 January	**Mikhail Mishustin approved as Prime Minister**								
15 January	**Dmitry Medvedev resigned as Prime Minister**								
15 January	**President Vladimir Putin announced a constitutional reform**								
12 January	WCIOM	32.5%	14.5%	12.6%	**5.9%**	11.2%	12.7%	9.1%	18.0%
12 January	FOM	32%	12%	13%	3%	10%	14%	13%	19%
18 September 2016	Election result	54.20%	13.34%	13.14%	**6.22%**	11.23%			40.86%

=== 2019 ===
Fieldwork date	Polling firm	UR	CPRF	LDPR	JR	Others	Undecided	Abstention	Lead
22 December	WCIOM	33.0%	14.3%	12.8%	**5.6%**	10.8%	12.7%	9.2%	18.7%
22 December	FOM	34%	12%	12%	4%	8%	15%	13%	22%
18 December	Levada Center	29%	9%	8%	3%	10%	14%	24%	20%
15 December	WCIOM	31.4%	15.6%	13.0%	**6.0%**	10.7%	12.7%	9.0%	15.8%
15 December	FOM	33%	12%	12%	4%	9%	16%	14%	21%
8 December	WCIOM	32.3%	14.9%	12.8%	**5.9%**	10.6%	13.1%	8.9%	17.4%
8 December	FOM	32%	12%	12%	4%	9%	16%	14%	20%
1 December	WCIOM	33.3%	15.6%	12.3%	**5.8%**	11.0%	11.8%	8.7%	17.7%
1 December	FOM	33%	12%	12%	4%	8%	15%	13%	21%
24 November	WCIOM	32.7%	15.4%	11.5%	**5.6%**	10.8%	12.8%	9.5%	17.3%
24 November	FOM	33%	12%	12%	4%	9%	15%	12%	21%
17 November	WCIOM	32.6%	14.9%	12.1%	**6.2%**	10.1%	12.9%	9.6%	17.7%
17 November	FOM	33%	12%	12%	4%	10%	16%	12%	21%
10 November	WCIOM	33.0%	15.4%	12.0%	**5.7%**	10.9%	12.5%	9.0%	17.6%
10 November	FOM	34%	13%	11%	4%	9%	15%	13%	21%
3 November	WCIOM	32.6%	15.4%	12.6%	**6.0%**	10.6%	12.6%	8.9%	17.2%
3 November	FOM	32%	13%	12%	4%	9%	15%	14%	19%
27 October	WCIOM	33.9%	15.4%	11.7%	**5.6%**	10.6%	12.6%	8.8%	18.5%
27 October	FOM	31%	13%	12%	4%	10%	16%	13%	18%
20 October	WCIOM	33.3%	14.8%	12.6%	**6.0%**	11.2%	11.9%	8.8%	18.5%
20 October	FOM	32%	12%	13%	4%	9%	16%	12%	19%
13 October	WCIOM	33.7%	16.0%	12.9%	**6.0%**	10.5%	11.5%	8.0%	17.8%
13 October	FOM	34%	12%	13%	4%	8%	16%	13%	22%
6 October	WCIOM	33.4%	15.6%	12.4%	**6.6%**	10.8%	11.1%	8.6%	17.8%
6 October	FOM	31%	12%	13%	**5%**	9%	15%	14%	18%
29 September	WCIOM	32.5%	15.3%	13.0%	**5.9%**	10.7%	12.0%	9.0%	17.2%
29 September	FOM	31%	13%	13%	4%	8%	16%	14%	18%
22 September	WCIOM	33.7%	15.8%	11.9%	**6.0%**	10.6%	12.2%	8.3%	17.9%
22 September	FOM	33%	12%	13%	4%	8%	16%	12%	20%
15 September	WCIOM	33.6%	16.2%	12.3%	**5.9%**	10.7%	11.8%	8.4%	17.4%
15 September	FOM	33%	12%	13%	4%	8%	16%	12%	20%
8 September	WCIOM	32.2%	15.8%	12.6%	**6.3%**	10.5%	12.6%	8.5%	16.4%
8 September	FOM	31%	12%	12%	4%	9%	17%	12%	19%
8 September	**Gubernatorial elections in 16 Federal Subjects (UR hold 12, independents gain 4 from UR)**								
8 September	**Regional elections in 13 Federal Subjects (UR hold 12, LDPR gain 1 from UR)**								
8 September	**By-elections in 4 constituencies (UR hold 3, LDPR hold 1)**								
25 August	WCIOM	32.6%	14.6%	12.8%	**5.7%**	10.6%	13.3%	8.7%	18.0%
25 August	FOM	32%	12%	13%	4%	9%	15%	12%	19%
18 August	WCIOM	32.5%	15.5%	12.6%	**5.4%**	10.6%	13.3%	8.6%	17.0%
18 August	FOM	32%	12%	14%	4%	9%	15%	12%	18%
11 August	WCIOM	33.0%	15.6%	11.9%	**5.6%**	10.3%	13.7%	8.3%	17.4%
11 August	FOM	32%	10%	14%	4%	10%	16%	12%	18%
4 August	WCIOM	32.4%	15.1%	12.9%	**6.2%**	10.2%	13.5%	8.2%	17.3%
4 August	FOM	33%	11%	13%	4%	8%	16%	12%	20%
28 July	WCIOM	33.5%	15.5%	12.2%	**5.8%**	10.2%	13.2%	7.9%	18.0%
28 July	FOM	33%	12%	12%	4%	8%	15%	13%	21%
24 July	Levada Center	28%	11%	10%	2%	10%	11%	27%	17%
21 July	WCIOM	33.0%	14.7%	12.6%	**6.1%**	9.8%	14.0%	8.2%	18.3%
21 July	FOM	34%	12%	12%	**5%**	7%	15%	13%	22%
14 July	WCIOM	32.3%	15.8%	13.2%	**6.1%**	10.1%	13.1%	8.0%	16.5%
14 July	FOM	35%	12%	12%	4%	8%	16%	11%	23%
7 July	WCIOM	32.2%	15.3%	13.0%	**6.0%**	10.1%	13.7%	8.0%	16.9%
7 July	FOM	34%	12%	12%	4%	10%	16%	11%	22%
30 June	WCIOM	33.6%	15.1%	12.0%	**6.3%**	9.8%	13.0%	8.6%	18.5%
30 June	FOM	33%	11%	13%	**5%**	9%	16%	12%	20%
23 June	WCIOM	34.3%	14.6%	12.5%	**5.9%**	9.5%	13.1%	8.6%	19.7%
23 June	FOM	34%	11%	13%	4%	7%	17%	12%	21%
16 June	WCIOM	33.9%	15.4%	12.0%	**6.5%**	10.0%	12.7%	7.9%	18.5%
16 June	FOM	34%	12%	12%	4%	8%	16%	12%	22%
9 June	WCIOM	33.7%	15.8%	12.0%	**5.8%**	10.1%	12.7%	8.4%	17.9%
9 June	FOM	34%	12%	12%	4%	8%	16%	11%	22%
2 June	WCIOM	34.3%	14.8%	12.5%	**6.2%**	9.5%	13.0%	8.4%	19.5%
2 June	FOM	34%	12%	12%	4%	8%	16%	11%	22%
26 May	WCIOM	34.5%	15.1%	12.1%	**5.6%**	9.5%	13.1%	8.4%	19.4%
26 May	FOM	35%	13%	12%	4%	8%	16%	12%	23%
19 May	WCIOM	34.7%	15.3%	11.2%	**5.7%**	10.2%	13.3%	8.1%	19.4%
19 May	FOM	36%	13%	12%	4%	8%	16%	11%	23%
12 May	WCIOM	35.0%	14.7%	12.0%	**6.1%**	9.2%	13.5%	7.9%	20.3%
12 May	FOM	36%	13%	11%	3%	8%	15%	12%	23%
5 May	WCIOM	34.5%	15.3%	11.9%	**6.2%**	9.5%	12.9%	8.2%	19.2%
29 April	Levada Center	32%	10%	10%	3%	14%	13%	20%	22%
28 April	WCIOM	34.0%	16.3%	12.9%	**6.6%**	9.1%	12.5%	6.9%	17.7%
28 April	FOM	35%	12%	12%	4%	8%	17%	12%	23%
21 April	WCIOM	34.6%	15.6%	11.8%	**6.1%**	10.0%	12.7%	7.9%	19.0%
21 April	FOM	35%	12%	12%	3%	7%	15%	12%	23%
14 April	WCIOM	35.1%	15.8%	12.0%	**6.1%**	9.7%	12.8%	7.4%	19.3%
14 April	FOM	35%	12%	12%	3%	10%	17%	11%	23%
7 April	WCIOM	35.5%	15.1%	11.5%	**5.9%**	9.5%	12.7%	8.5%	20.4%
7 April	FOM	34%	13%	12%	3%	10%	17%	11%	21%
31 March	WCIOM	35.6%	15.0%	12.2%	**6.1%**	9.7%	12.6%	7.3%	20.6%
31 March	FOM	32%	13%	12%	3%	10%	16%	12%	19%
24 March	WCIOM	37.1%	15.3%	10.8%	**5.6%**	8.4%	12.6%	8.6%	21.8%
24 March	FOM	33%	13%	11%	4%	5%	16%	13%	20%
17 March	WCIOM	34.8%	16.5%	11.3%	**6.6%**	9.1%	12.3%	7.8%	18.3%
17 March	FOM	34%	13%	11%	4%	5%	17%	13%	21%
10 March	WCIOM	34.6%	16.1%	11.7%	**5.5%**	9.3%	12.9%	8.2%	18.5%
10 March	FOM	34%	12%	11%	4%	7%	17%	13%	22%
3 March	WCIOM	35.4%	15.3%	11.4%	**6.1%**	8.9%	12.9%	8.2%	20.1%
3 March	FOM	35%	12%	11%	4%	7%	17%	12%	23%
24 February	WCIOM	35.2%	14.9%	12.1%	**5.3%**	9.1%	13.5%	8.5%	20.3%
24 February	FOM	33%	13%	11%	4%	7%	16%	13%	20%
17 February	WCIOM	33.2%	15.8%	12.7%	**6.2%**	9.1%	12.4%	9.1%	17.4%
17 February	FOM	32%	13%	12%	4%	6%	17%	13%	19%
10 February	WCIOM	33.2%	16.0%	13.3%	**5.9%**	9.0%	12.6%	8.5%	17.2%
10 February	FOM	33%	13%	12%	4%	6%	17%	12%	20%
3 February	WCIOM	32.9%	15.9%	12.3%	**6.3%**	9.4%	12.5%	9.0%	17.0%
3 February	FOM	32%	14%	12%	3%	5%	18%	14%	18%
27 January	WCIOM	32.3%	16.2%	13.4%	**6.0%**	9.2%	12.0%	9.2%	16.1%
27 January	FOM	32%	12%	11%	3%	5%	19%	14%	20%
20 January	WCIOM	32.7%	16.3%	12.0%	**6.3%**	9.7%	11.6%	10.0%	16.4%
20 January	FOM	33%	12%	11%	4%	5%	19%	13%	21%
13 January	WCIOM	33.8%	16.3%	11.8%	**6.0%**	8.8%	12.6%	9.2%	17.5%
13 January	FOM	33%	13%	13%	3%	5%	18%	13%	20%
18 September 2016	Election result	54.20%	13.34%	13.14%	**6.22%**	11.23%			40.86%

=== 2018 ===
Fieldwork date	Polling firm	UR	CPRF	LDPR	JR	Others	Undecided	Abstention	Lead
29 December	WCIOM	35.6%	15.8%	12.1%	**6.3%**	9.4%	11.8%	7.5%	19.8%
23 December	WCIOM	35.2%	15.5%	11.8%	**6.5%**	9.4%	12.1%	8.0%	19.7%
23 December	FOM	33%	13%	11%	4%	5%	17%	13%	20%
22 December	CIPKR	33%	18%	10%	**6%**	18%	9%	6%	15%
16 December	**Gubernatorial recall election in Primorsky Krai (UR hold)**								
16 December	FOM	34%	14%	11%	3%	6%	18%	12%	20%
16 December	WCIOM	36.2%	15.5%	11.7%	**5.5%**	9.1%	11.8%	8.6%	20.7%
9 December	FOM	34%	14%	10%	4%	6%	16%	14%	20%
9 December	WCIOM	36.6%	15.3%	11.1%	**5.9%**	8.2%	12.7%	8.7%	21.3%
2 December	FOM	35%	14%	11%	3%	5%	17%	13%	21%
2 December	WCIOM	35.4%	15.5%	10.9%	**5.6%**	9.4%	12.8%	8.8%	19.9%
25 November	FOM	33%	14%	11%	3%	4%	16%	15%	19%
25 November	WCIOM	33.9%	16.7%	11.5%	**6.1%**	9.3%	12.3%	8.5%	17.2%
18 November	FOM	32%	14%	12%	3%	3%	18%	14%	18%
18 November	WCIOM	35.7%	16.4%	10.7%	**5.6%**	8.7%	12.2%	8.6%	19.3%
11 November	FOM	33%	13%	11%	4%	6%	17%	13%	20%
11 November	WCIOM	36.7%	15.5%	10.9%	**5.9%**	8.3%	12.2%	8.7%	21.2%
11 November	**Second round of gubernatorial election in Khakassia (CPRF gain from UR)**								
4 November	FOM	35%	13%	12%	3%	3%	16%	13%	22%
28 October	FOM	35%	12%	12%	4%	4%	16%	14%	23%
28 October	WCIOM	36.3%	16.1%	11.5%	**5.5%**	8.7%	12.3%	8.1%	20.2%
28 October	**Sergey Mironov is re-elected as the leader of A Just Russia**								
21 October	FOM	35%	13%	12%	3%	4%	15%	14%	22%
21 October	WCIOM	36.7%	16.5%	11.6%	**5.8%**	8.3%	11.2%	8.5%	20.2%
14 October	FOM	35%	14%	12%	4%	4%	16%	13%	21%
14 October	WCIOM	36.7%	16.4%	11.4%	**5.7%**	8.4%	11.4%	8.4%	20.3%
7 October	FOM	32%	13%	13%	3%	7%	16%	14%	19%
7 October	WCIOM	34.9%	15.8%	12.6%	**6.3%**	8.4%	11.7%	8.8%	19.1%
30 September	FOM	31%	14%	14%	4%	6%	15%	14%	17%
30 September	WCIOM	34.5%	17.6%	12.0%	**6.1%**	8.1%	12.2%	8.1%	16.9%
23 September	FOM	34%	13%	13%	3%	4%	17%	13%	21%
23 September	WCIOM	35.5%	17.5%	11.2%	**5.6%**	8.3%	11.8%	8.4%	18.0%
23 September	**Second round of gubernatorial elections in Khabarovsk Krai and Vladimir Oblast (LDPR gain both from UR)**								
16 September	FOM	35%	13%	12%	4%	4%	15%	14%	22%
16 September	WCIOM	36.6%	17.0%	10.8%	**6.2%**	8.3%	11.4%	8.5%	19.6%
16 September	**Second round of gubernatorial election in Primorsky Krai (UR hold, but result is annulled)**								
9 September	FOM	34%	13%	11%	3%	4%	17%	13%	21%
9 September	WCIOM	35.3%	16.2%	11.2%	**6.7%**	7.8%	13.0%	8.5%	19.2%
9 September	**Gubernatorial elections in 26 Federal Subjects (UR hold 20, JR hold 1, CPRF hold 1, 4 runoffs)**								
9 September	**Regional elections in sixteen Federal Subjects (UR hold 12, lose overall control in 4)**								
9 September	**By-elections in seven constituencies (UR hold 5, LDPR hold 1, CPRF gain 1 from UR)**								
2 September	WCIOM	36.3%	14.7%	11.3%	**6.2%**	8.3%	13.5%	8.3%	21.6%
2 September	FOM	35%	13%	11%	4%	3%	17%	12%	22%
30 August	Levada Center	28%	9%	11%	3%	9%	13%	22%	17%
26 August	WCIOM	36.6%	14.9%	11.6%	**6.4%**	7.7%	13.5%	7.9%	21.7%
26 August	FOM	34%	13%	11%	4%	4%	17%	13%	21%
19 August	WCIOM	36.1%	15.3%	11.1%	**5.9%**	7.7%	13.5%	9.0%	20.8%
19 August	FOM	35%	12%	12%	4%	3%	17%	14%	23%
12 August	WCIOM	35.3%	14.7%	11.4%	**6.2%**	7.8%	14.4%	9.0%	20.6%
12 August	FOM	34%	12%	12%	4%	4%	18%	13%	22%
9 August	CIPKR	25%	18%	13%	**6%**	17%	10%	8%	7%
5 August	WCIOM	34.9%	15.8%	11.8%	**6.3%**	7.9%	13.4%	8.7%	19.1%
5 August	FOM	32%	12%	12%	3%	6%	16%	15%	20%
29 July	WCIOM	35.0%	15.6%	10.9%	**6.2%**	7.9%	14.2%	8.9%	19.4%
29 July	FOM	33%	13%	11%	4%	3%	19%	13%	20%
22 July	WCIOM	37.1%	15.5%	10.7%	**5.8%**	7.6%	13.2%	8.8%	21.6%
22 July	FOM	35%	13%	12%	3%	3%	16%	14%	22%
15 July	WCIOM	38.6%	14.4%	10.2%	**6.0%**	8.9%	13.1%	8.7%	24.2%
15 July	FOM	37%	12%	10%	4%	4%	16%	13%	25%
8 July	WCIOM	38.8%	13.6%	10.3%	**5.9%**	8.2%	13.5%	8.6%	25.2%
8 July	FOM	36%	12%	11%	4%	6%	17%	13%	24%
1 July	WCIOM	38.1%	14.5%	10.5%	**5.7%**	7.6%	13.5%	8.8%	23.6%
1 July	FOM	36%	13%	11%	4%	3%	16%	14%	23%
24 June	WCIOM	38.7%	14.5%	10.3%	**5.7%**	8.1%	13.3%	8.3%	24.2%
24 June	FOM	35%	13%	11%	4%	5%	17%	13%	22%
17 June	WCIOM	45.9%	11.8%	9.5%	4.9%	6.9%	13.1%	6.9%	34.1%
17 June	FOM	38%	12%	10%	4%	4%	17%	13%	26%
14 June	**Dmitry Medvedev announces government's intention to increase the retirement age (from 55/60 to 63/65)**								
10 June	WCIOM	47.8%	11.1%	8.3%	4.6%	7.0%	12.7%	7.6%	36.7%
10 June	FOM	45%	9%	8%	3%	5%	16%	12%	36%
3 June	WCIOM	48.9%	10.8%	8.7%	4.9%	6.9%	11.8%	7.1%	38.1%
3 June	FOM	42%	10%	10%	3%	4%	16%	13%	32%
27 May	WCIOM	49.3%	10.2%	8.6%	4.7%	6.6%	12.1%	7.6%	39.1%
27 May	FOM	46%	9%	9%	2%	3%	16%	11%	37%
20 May	WCIOM	49.9%	10.8%	8.1%	4.8%	6.6%	11.5%	7.2%	39.1%
20 May	FOM	47%	10%	8%	4%	4%	15%	10%	37%
13 May	WCIOM	49.9%	10.4%	7.7%	4.8%	6.5%	12.3%	7.2%	39.5%
13 May	FOM	46%	9%	9%	3%	5%	15%	11%	37%
8 May	**Dmitry Medvedev re-approved as Prime Minister**								
6 May	WCIOM	50.7%	9.3%	7.8%	4.7%	6.5%	12.1%	7.9%	41.4%
29 April	WCIOM	49.9%	9.7%	8.4%	3.4%	7.0%	13.0%	7.5%	40.2%
22 April	WCIOM	49.4%	10.3%	8.2%	3.8%	6.6%	13.9%	7.2%	39.1%
15 April	FOM	47%	9%	8%	2%	3%	17%	11%	38%
15 April	WCIOM	48.8%	10.7%	7.8%	2.9%	6.7%	14.8%	7.3%	38.1%
8 April	FOM	47%	9%	8%	2%	3%	16%	12%	38%
8 April	WCIOM	49.5%	10.6%	7.9%	3.5%	7.1%	13.9%	6.7%	38.9%
1 April	FOM	47%	10%	7%	2%	4%	18%	9%	37%
1 April	WCIOM	50.8%	10.7%	7.8%	3.5%	7.1%	12.8%	6.5%	40.1%
25 March	FOM	53%	9%	6%	1%	4%	17%	9%	44%
25 March	WCIOM	51.5%	11.4%	7.8%	3.8%	6.6%	12.1%	6.1%	39.7%
18 March	**Vladimir Putin (independent, support by UR and JR) won the presidential election**								
17 March	WCIOM	52.2%	8.5%	8.4%	3.1%	6.3%	15.2%	5.3%	43.7%
11 March	WCIOM	51.4%	9.1%	8.3%	2.5%	5.6%	16.2%	6.2%	42.3%
11 March	FOM	50%	8%	8%	2%	4%	17%	8%	42%
4 March	WCIOM	52.0%	9.4%	8.8%	2.7%	5.7%	14.8%	5.9%	42.6%
4 March	FOM	51%	8%	9%	2%	4%	17%	8%	42%
25 February	WCIOM	50.6%	9.5%	10.1%	3.0%	5.4%	14.5%	6.0%	41.2%
25 February	FOM	49%	9%	10%	2%	4%	16%	7%	39%
18-25 February	WCIOM	49.5%	10.1%	8.9%	3.8%	5.9%	14.8%	6.3%	39.4%
18 February	FOM	50%	9%	9%	2%	3%	15%	9%	41%
4–11 February	WCIOM	50.8%	9.6%	8.7%	3.2%	5.4%	15.1%	6.5%	41.2%
10–11 February	FOM	51%	8%	9%	3%	4%	16%	8%	42%
28 January–4 February	WCIOM	50.0%	9.5%	10.4%	3.8%	5.6%	12.9%	7.1%	39.6%
3–4 February	FOM	51%	9%	9%	3%	6%	14%	7%	42%
21–28 January	WCIOM	49.4%	10.0%	9.1%	4.2%	5.6%	14.1%	6.8%	39.4%
27–28 January	FOM	53%	8%	8%	2%	5%	15%	8%	45%
20–21 January	FOM	50%	8%	8%	2%	4%	16%	9%	42%
14–21 January	WCIOM	52.3%	10.0%	8.7%	3.4%	5.8%	8.1%	10.7%	42.3%
13–14 January	FOM	50%	9%	7%	3%	7%	16%	9%	41%
7–14 January	WCIOM	53.2%	10.5%	9.5%	3.8%	5.2%	7.7%	9.3%	42.7%
18 September 2016	Election result	54.20%	13.34%	13.14%	**6.22%**	11.23%			40.86%

=== 2017 ===
Fieldwork date	Polling firm	UR	CPRF	LDPR	JR	Others	Undecided	Abstention	Lead
24–29 December	WCIOM	51.6%	11.0%	10.2%	4.3%	5.0%	7.6%	9.3%	41.9%
25 December	**A Just Russia supports Putin's presidential bid**								
17–24 December	WCIOM	52.3%	9.2%	10.4%	4.6%	5.9%	7.1%	9.7%	41.9%
23–24 December	FOM	51%	8%	9%	3%	5%	15%	8%	42%
23 December	**United Russia supports Putin's presidential bid**								
23 December	**Pavel Grudinin nominated as presidential candidate from the Communist Party**								
20 December	**Vladimir Zhirinovsky nominated as presidential candidate from the Liberal Democratic Party**								
16–17 December	FOM	51%	7%	10%	3%	6%	14%	8%	41%
10–17 December	WCIOM	54.4%	8.5%	9.2%	3.9%	5.8%	6.7%	10.6%	45.2%
14 December	**Vladimir Putin said that he will run for president as independent candidate**								
3–11 December	FOM	50%	8%	10%	2%	4%	13%	8%	40%
3–10 December	WCIOM	53.8%	7.6%	10.0%	4.3%	5.5%	6.3%	11.1%	43.8%
8 December	CIPKR	44%	11%	9%	4%	2%	15%	10%	33%
1–5 December	Levada Centre	37%	9%	10%	3%	7%	17%	12%	27%
27 November–3 December	FOM	51%	8%	9%	3%	3%	13%	9%	42%
26 November–3 December	WCIOM	52.2%	9.4%	10.1%	4.6%	5.5%	6.4%	11.0%	42.1%
17–27 November	FOM	50%	8%	9%	3%	6%	14%	9%	41%
19–26 November	WCIOM	52.3%	8.6%	10.4%	4.9%	6.5%	5.6%	10.9%	41.9%
12–19 November	WCIOM	52.1%	9.6%	9.4%	4.2%	5.1%	6.9%	11.8%	42.5%
14–17 November	FOM	50%	9%	9%	3%	4%	13%	10%	41%
3–14 November	FOM	50%	9%	9%	3%	5%	13%	9%	41%
5–12 November	WCIOM	52.1%	9.2%	9.5%	**5.3%**	5.5%	6.8%	10.7%	42.6%
29 October–5 November	WCIOM	53.4%	8.2%	10.0%	**5.1%**	5.2%	6.2%	10.9%	43.4%
30 October–3 November	FOM	50%	8%	9%	4%	5%	13%	9%	41%
22–29 October	WCIOM	51.8%	9.0%	10.1%	**5.0%**	5.5%	6.5%	11.1%	41.7%
20–30 October	FOM	50%	7%	10%	**5%**	5%	12%	10%	40%
15–22 October	WCIOM	52.0%	9.2%	9.7%	4.4%	6.2%	6.3%	11.4%	42.3%
13–20 October	FOM	49%	8%	11%	4%	4%	12%	10%	38%
8-15 October	WCIOM	50.8%	8.7%	10.1%	**5.0%**	5.3%	7.1%	12.2%	40.7%
6–13 October	FOM	49%	9%	11%	4%	3%	12%	9%	38%
1–8 October	WCIOM	50.7%	9.4%	9.8%	4.6%	5.9%	6.3%	12.5%	40.9%
3–6 October	FOM	50%	9%	10%	4%	6%	12%	9%	40%
27 September–3 October	FOM	50%	8%	9%	4%	5%	13%	9%	41%
24 September–1 October	WCIOM	51.0%	8.9%	9.2%	**5.5%**	6.5%	5.9%	11.6%	41.8%
18–27 September	FOM	49%	9%	10%	4%	4%	14%	9%	39%
17–24 September	WCIOM	51.7%	9.1%	9.4%	**5.2%**	5.5%	6.0%	12.2%	42.3%
8–18 September	FOM	49%	9%	11%	4%	4%	12%	9%	40%
10–17 September	WCIOM	52.9%	8.6%	9.5%	3.8%	5.8%	5.4%	12.7%	43.4%
10 September	**Gubernatorial elections in 17 Federal Subjects (UR hold all)**								
10 September	**Regional elections in six Federal Subjects (UR hold all)**								
10 September	**By-elections in Bryansk (LDPR gain from UR) and Kingisepp (UR hold) constituencies**								
3–10 September	WCIOM	52.1%	9.0%	10.0%	4.5%	5.5%	7.3%	10.8%	42.1%
29 August–8 September	FOM	49%	8%	11%	4%	5%	12%	10%	38%
27 August–3 September	WCIOM	51.6%	9.1%	9.3%	4.6%	5.3%	7.5%	11.8%	42.3%
20–29 August	FOM	49%	7%	11%	3%	7%	13%	10%	38%
20–27 August	WCIOM	49.2%	9.2%	10.8%	**5.5%**	6.0%	6.8%	11.7%	38.4%
13–20 August	WCIOM	51.0%	9.4%	10.8%	4.4%	6.3%	6.9%	10.6%	40.0%
13–20 August	FOM	49%	7%	12%	4%	4%	12%	10%	37%
6–13 August	WCIOM	50.9%	8.6%	10.9%	4.9%	5.5%	7.2%	10.8%	40.0%
30 July–6 August	WCIOM	51.9%	8.3%	11.5%	**5.4%**	5.4%	5.3%	11.0%	40.4%
23–30 July	WCIOM	50.3%	9.1%	11.1%	**5.0%**	6.2%	6.3%	10.9%	39.2%
23–28 July	FOM	46%	9%	11%	4%	4%	14%	9%	35%
16–23 July	WCIOM	49.2%	9.6%	11.7%	**5.5%**	6.4%	6.3%	10.4%	37.5%
14–23 July	FOM	46%	8%	10%	4%	6%	14%	10%	36%
9–16 July	WCIOM	50.6%	8.7%	10.6%	**5.2%**	5.1%	5.9%	12.3%	40.0%
7–14 July	FOM	47%	8%	11%	4%	5%	13%	10%	36%
2–9 July	WCIOM	47.9%	9.9%	11.0%	**5.7%**	5.1%	7.0%	12.5%	36.9%
1–7 July	FOM	48%	8%	11%	4%	5%	12%	10%	37%
25 June–2 July	WCIOM	47.8%	9.8%	12.1%	4.8%	5.4%	6.0%	13.2%	35.7%
23 June–1 July	FOM	49%	8%	11%	4%	5%	12%	9%	38%
23–26 June	Levada Centre	39%	8%	8%	2%	8%	22%	16%	31%
18–25 June	WCIOM	47.4%	10.6%	11.7%	4.9%	6.3%	6.5%	11.6%	35.7%
18–23 June	FOM	48%	7%	12%	4%	5%	12%	10%	36%
12–18 June	FOM	48%	8%	12%	4%	4%	11%	11%	36%
11–18 June	WCIOM	50.9%	8.9%	10.1%	4.9%	6.4%	5.8%	11.5%	40.8%
5–12 June	FOM	47%	9%	12%	4%	3%	11%	11%	35%
4–11 June	WCIOM	48.8%	9.2%	12.8%	**5.6%**	5.6%	5.2%	11.5%	36.0%
28 May–4 June	WCIOM	48.4%	9.5%	12.0%	4.4%	6.4%	5.9%	12.4%	36.4%
21–28 May	WCIOM	47.6%	9.4%	12.6%	**5.3%**	6.5%	6.1%	11.7%	35.0%
26 May	**Gennady Zyuganov is re-elected as the leader of the Communist Party**								
14–21 May	WCIOM	47.6%	10.7%	12.5%	**5.0%**	6.0%	5.7%	11.5%	35.1%
7–14 May	WCIOM	49.4%	9.3%	12.8%	**5.4%**	4.6%	6.2%	11.4%	37.1%
30 April–7 May	WCIOM	49.3%	10.5%	12.1%	**5.0%**	5.5%	5.7%	11.1%	37.2%
23–30 April	WCIOM	48.1%	10.2%	12.0%	**5.4%**	6.0%	5.9%	11.5%	36.1%
16–23 April	WCIOM	47.7%	11.0%	12.4%	**5.1%**	5.7%	6.0%	11.0%	35.5%
9–16 April	WCIOM	48.0%	10.6%	12.6%	**5.4%**	5.3%	5.8%	11.5%	35.4%
2–9 April	WCIOM	49.3%	9.5%	12.6%	4.8%	5.8%	5.4%	11.8%	36.7%
26 March–2 April	WCIOM	49.0%	9.3%	14.4%	4.8%	5.0%	5.7%	11.0%	34.6%
19–26 March	WCIOM	49.7%	9.3%	12.9%	**5.1%**	5.6%	5.1%	11.3%	36.8%
12–19 March	WCIOM	51.4%	9.3%	13.0%	4.6%	5.1%	4.7%	10.6%	38.4%
5–12 March	WCIOM	50.1%	9.4%	12.5%	**5.6%**	7.0%	4.3%	10.3%	37.6%
26 February–5 March	WCIOM	49.9%	10.2%	11.5%	**6.1%**	5.8%	4.8%	10.8%	38.4%
19–26 February	WCIOM	51.1%	9.4%	12.5%	**5.1%**	5.3%	4.4%	11.3%	38.6%
12–19 February	WCIOM	50.3%	8.8%	13.3%	**5.2%**	6.4%	4.6%	10.7%	37.0%
5–12 February	WCIOM	49.8%	10.2%	12.0%	**5.9%**	6.0%	4.7%	10.5%	37.8%
29 January–5 February	WCIOM	48.7%	10.9%	12.9%	**5.2%**	5.1%	4.4%	11.9%	35.8%
4 February	**Vladimir Zhirinovsky is re-elected as the leader of the Liberal Democratic Party**								
22–29 January	WCIOM	50.7%	10.0%	11.8%	4.7%	6.4%	4.7%	10.8%	38.9%
22 January	**Dmitry Medvedev is re-elected as the leader of United Russia**								
15–22 January	WCIOM	50.8%	10.4%	13.0%	**5.1%**	4.4%	4.6%	10.8%	37.8%
8–15 January	WCIOM	49.3%	10.5%	13.7%	**5.2%**	5.3%	4.0%	11.3%	35.6%
18 September 2016	Election result	54.20%	13.34%	13.14%	**6.22%**	11.23%			40.86%

=== 2016 ===
Fieldwork date	Polling firm	UR	CPRF	LDPR	JR	Others	Undecided	Abstention	Lead
18–25 December	WCIOM	48.0%	8.8%	12.1%	**6.5%**	5.6%	5.3%	13.0%	35.9%
11–18 December	WCIOM	48.0%	8.2%	12.0%	4.9%	6.0%	5.2%	14.3%	36.0%
4–11 December	WCIOM	46.9%	9.4%	12.0%	**6.2%**	6.2%	5.3%	13.3%	34.9%
27 November–4 December	WCIOM	45.1%	8.8%	13.1%	**7.8%**	6.1%	4.4%	13.8%	32.0%
20–27 November	WCIOM	46.8%	8.9%	13.0%	**5.3%**	5.3%	5.0%	14.9%	33.8%
13–20 November	WCIOM	43.2%	8.8%	15.1%	**5.9%**	6.2%	4.1%	15.5%	28.1%
6–13 November	WCIOM	45.1%	9.2%	14.3%	**5.3%**	7.0%	5.3%	12.9%	30.8%
30 October–6 November	WCIOM	44.9%	9.4%	12.6%	**6.8%**	6.4%	3.9%	14.9%	32.3%
23–30 October	WCIOM	44.4%	11.0%	12.2%	**6.1%**	7.0%	4.9%	13.5%	32.2%
16–23 October	WCIOM	41.5%	10.4%	13.8%	**6.8%**	7.4%	4.0%	13.9%	27.7%
9–16 October	WCIOM	44.7%	8.8%	13.8%	**5.9%**	7.0%	4.5%	14.2%	30.9%
2–9 October	WCIOM	44.6%	8.4%	13.7%	**6.3%**	8.2%	3.8%	13.7%	30.9%
25 September–2 October	WCIOM	43.5%	8.9%	15.0%	**5.8%**	7.4%	3.9%	13.8%	28.5%
18–25 September	WCIOM	43.1%	10.0%	15.7%	**5.0%**	8.7%	2.9%	13.8%	27.4%
18 September	Election result	54.20%	13.34%	13.14%	**6.22%**	11.23%			40.86%

== Regional polls and elections ==
=== Altai Republic ===
Fieldwork date	Polling firm	UR	CPRF	LDPR	JR	Others	Undecided	Abstention	Lead
8 September 2019	Regional election	34.2%	29.5%	12.0%	5.3%	14.9%	—	—	4.7%
26–29 March 2019	CIPKR	34%	16%	10%	6%	15%	11%	7%	18%
18 September 2016	Election result	48.81%	18.89%	12.73%	4.10%	13.47%			29.92%

=== Buryatia ===
Fieldwork date	Polling firm	UR	CPRF	LDPR	JR	Others	Undecided	Abstention	Lead
30 August - 5 September 2021	NMCPSM	22%	31%	15%	14%	16%			9%
26-30 July 2021	NMCPSM	19%	30%	—	—	—	—	—	11%
22 November-5 December 2018	Black Cub	21.1%	30.6%	14.1%	7.4%	—	—	—	9.5%
9 September 2018	Regional election	41.1%	25.6%	12.1%	9.4%	7.4%	—	—	15.5%
27-31 August 2018	FOM	34%	13%	6%	3%	0%	24%	18%	21%
18 September 2016	Election result	43.34%	20.59%	13.54%	6.55%	13.41%			22.75%

=== Crimea ===
Fieldwork date	Polling firm	UR	CPRF	LDPR	JR	Others	Undecided	Abstention	Lead
8 September 2019	Regional election	54.7%	8.2%	16.8%	4.0%	—	11%	—	45%
26–29 March 2019	CIPKR	54%	4%	9%	5%	5%	11%	10%	45%
18 September 2016	Election result	72.80%	5.60%	11.14%	2.06%	5.30%			61.66%

=== Kabardino–Balkaria ===
Fieldwork date	Polling firm	UR	CPRF	LDPR	JR	Others	Undecided	Abstention	Lead
8 September 2019	Regional election	65.9%	12.8%	5.1%	10.4%	5.7%	—	—	52.9%
26–29 March 2019	CIPKR	39%	15%	6%	2%	13%	9%	13%	24%
18 September 2016	Election result	77.71%	18.90%	0.15%	2.09%	1.15%			58.81%

=== Karachay–Cherkessia ===
Fieldwork date	Polling firm	UR	CPRF	LDPR	JR	Others	Undecided	Abstention	Lead
8 September 2019	Regional election	65.0%	12.2%	5.0%	6.2%	11.1%	—	—	52.8%
26–29 March 2019	CIPKR	40%	12%	3%	1%	14%	12%	14%	28%
18 September 2016	Election result	81.67%	7.97%	0.64%	1.07%	8.44%			73.70%

=== Khakassia ===
Fieldwork date	Polling firm	UR	CPRF	LDPR	JR	Others	Undecided	Abstention	Lead
30 August - 5 September 2021	NMCPSM	33%	32%	7%	9%	11%			1%
1-2 November 2018	CIPKR	35%	25%	12%	4%	9%	9%	5%	10%
18-20 October 2018	CIPKR	25%	28%	14%	4%	10%	12%	5%	3%
9 September 2018	Regional election	25.5%	31.0%	21.0%	7.1%	9.8%	—	—	4.5%
27-31 August 2018	FOM	30%	16%	12%	2%	3%	24%	12%	14%
18 September 2016	Election result	38.06%	20.90%	19.52%	7.17%	12.00%			17.16%

=== Komi ===
Fieldwork date	Polling firm	UR	CPRF	LDPR	JR	Others	Undecided	Abstention	Lead
30 August - 1 September 2021	NMCPSM	22.8%	18.1%	13.6%	12.9%	18.0%	—	—	4.7%
13 September 2020	Regional election	28.6%	14.8%	14.5%	8.6%	27.1%	—	—	13.8%
18 September 2016	Election result	37.85%	12.49%	22.59%	8.82%	15.16%			15.26%

=== Mari El ===
Fieldwork date	Polling firm	UR	CPRF	LDPR	JR	Others	Undecided	Abstention	Lead
8 September 2019	Regional election	37.5%	26.9%	15.8%	7.8%	9.0%	—	—	10.6%
26–29 March 2019	CIPKR	43%	18%	9%	3%	10%	11%	5%	25%
18 September 2016	Election result	46.70%	27.28%	10.44%	4.60%	9.37%			19.42%

=== Tatarstan ===
Fieldwork date	Polling firm	UR	CPRF	LDPR	JR	Others	Undecided	Abstention	Lead
8 September 2019	Regional election	72.4%	10.7%	3.8%	4.0%	7.9%	—	—	61.7%
26–29 March 2019	CIPKR	34%	13%	9%	4%	13%	15%	10%	21%
18 September 2016	Election result	87.27%	4.07%	2.25%	2.26%	6.16%			83.20%

=== Tuva ===
Fieldwork date	Polling firm	UR	CPRF	LDPR	JR	Others	Undecided	Abstention	Lead
30 August - 5 September 2021	NMCPSM	81%	4%	4%	8%	1%			73%
26-30 July 2021	NMCPSM	82%	4%	—	—	—	—	—	78%
8 September 2019	Regional election	80.1%	3.6%	7.8%	4.6%	2.3%	—	—	72.3%
26–29 March 2019	CIPKR	48%	8%	5%	5%	11%	12%	10%	40%
18 September 2016	Election result	82.61%	4.17%	3.12%	4.35%	5.71%			78.26%

=== Yakutia ===
Fieldwork date	Polling firm	UR	CPRF	LDPR	JR	Others	Undecided	Abstention	Lead
22 November-5 December 2018	Black Cub	30.8%	21.4%	8.6%	22.4%	—	—	—	8.4%
9 September 2018	Regional election	50.8%	19.4%	9.6%	16.3%	—	—	—	31.4%
18 September 2016	Election result	46.42%	14.35%	10.70%	15.20%	11.52%			31.22%

=== Kamchatka Krai ===
Fieldwork date	Polling firm	UR	CPRF	LDPR	JR	Others	Undecided	Abstention	Lead
22 November-5 December 2018	Black Cub	33.3%	15.3%	23.0%	1.2%	—	—	—	10.3%
18 September 2016	Election result	46.70%	12.59%	21.31%	4.42%	11.64%			25.39%

=== Khabarovsk Krai ===
Fieldwork date	Polling firm	UR	CPRF	LDPR	JR	Others	Undecided	Abstention	Lead
30 August - 5 September 2021	NMCPSM	15%	20%	37%	6%	17%			22%
26-30 July 2021	NMCPSM	12%	—	36%	3%	—	—	—	24%
8 September 2019	Regional election	12.5%	17.2%	56.1%	3.5%	6.9%	—	—	38.9%
26–29 March 2019	CIPKR	17%	10%	35%	2%	13%	15%	7%	18%
22 November-5 December 2018	Black Cub	14.8%	18.3%	31.8%	5.8%	—	—	—	13.5%
18 September 2016	Election result	37.31%	16.46%	25.01%	4.52%	14.03%			12.30%

=== Primorsky Krai ===
Fieldwork date	Polling firm	UR	CPRF	LDPR	JR	Others	Undecided	Abstention	Lead
22 November-5 December 2018	Black Cub	29.5%	22.8%	18.4%	4.2%	—	—	—	6.7%
18-20 October 2018	CIPKR	24%	30%	12%	3%	14%	7%	9%	6%
26-28 August 2018	CIPKR	25%	28%	13%	5%	16%	6%	6%	3%
18 September 2016	Election result	38.99%	17.95%	19.66%	5.16%	14.86%			19.33%

=== Zabaykalsky Krai ===
Fieldwork date	Polling firm	UR	CPRF	LDPR	JR	Others	Undecided	Abstention	Lead
30 August - 5 September 2021	NMCPSM	23%	23%	21%	15%	16%			-
22 November-5 December 2018	Black Cub	20.6%	18.4%	22.2%	3.7%	—	—	—	1.6%
9 September 2018	Regional election	28.3%	24.6%	24.6%	9.0%	9.4	—	—	3.7%
27-31 August 2018	FOM	30%	13%	21%	6%	5%	7%	12%	9%
18 September 2016	Election result	39.87%	15.93%	26.40%	4.17%	10.78%			13.47%

=== Amur Oblast ===
Fieldwork date	Polling firm	UR	CPRF	LDPR	JR	Others	Undecided	Abstention	Lead
22 November-5 December 2018	Black Cub	30.9%	18.4%	32.7%	1.1%	—	—	—	1.8%
18 September 2016	Election result	37.91%	16.62%	29.02%	4.15%	9.90%			8.89%

=== Bryansk Oblast ===
Fieldwork date	Polling firm	UR	CPRF	LDPR	JR	Others	Undecided	Abstention	Lead
8 September 2019	Regional election	63.7%	12.9%	12.3%	5.1%	4.0%	—	—	50.8%
26–29 March 2019	CIPKR	34%	15%	14%	3%	11%	15%	5%	19%
18 September 2016	Election result	63.91%	13.29%	10.80%	3.48%	7.25%			50.62%

=== Vladimir Oblast ===
Fieldwork date	Polling firm	UR	CPRF	LDPR	JR	Others	Undecided	Abstention	Lead
9 September 2018	Regional election	29.6%	23.7%	20.8%	10.2%	11.9%	—	—	5.9%
27-31 August 2018	FOM	30%	9%	13%	2%	2%	28%	15%	27%
18 September 2016	Election result	45.20%	13.03%	17.96%	7.61%	2.78%			27.24%

=== Volgograd Oblast ===
Fieldwork date	Polling firm	UR	CPRF	LDPR	JR	Others	Undecided	Abstention	Lead
8 September 2019	Regional election	48.2%	19.5%	14.9%	8.4%	6.3%	—	—	28.7%
26–29 March 2019	CIPKR	27%	17%	14%	3%	14%	14%	8%	10%
18 September 2016	Election result	50.64%	16.17%	14.94%	5.61%	16.78%			34.47%

=== Ivanovo Oblast ===
Fieldwork date	Polling firm	UR	CPRF	LDPR	JR	Others	Undecided	Abstention	Lead
9 September 2018	Regional election	34.1%	26.9%	16.3%	8.2%	10.7%	—	—	7.2%
27-31 August 2018	FOM	26%	13%	10%	3%	2%	24%	21%	13%
18 September 2016	Election result	42.38%	18.08%	17.67%	7.31%	10.93%			24.30%

=== Irkutsk Oblast ===
Fieldwork date	Polling firm	UR	CPRF	LDPR	JR	Others	Undecided	Abstention	Lead
9 September 2018	Regional election	27.8%	33.9%	15.8%	7.0%	10.9%	—	—	6.1%
27-31 August 2018	FOM	32%	15%	11%	4%	2%	15%	20%	7%
18 September 2016	Election result	39.77%	24.08%	17.01%	5.19%	11.85%			15.69%

=== Kemerovo Oblast ===
Fieldwork date	Polling firm	UR	CPRF	LDPR	JR	Others	Undecided	Abstention	Lead
30 August - 5 September 2021	NMCPSM	24%	18%	7%	13%	21%			6%
9 September 2018	Regional election	64.4%	10.0%	10.1%	7.8%	5.5%	—	—	54.3%
27-31 August 2018	FOM	39%	8%	12%	3%	1%	23%	14%	27%
18 September 2016	Election result	77.33%	7.21%	7.72%	4.51%	2.78%			69.61%

=== Magadan Oblast ===
Fieldwork date	Polling firm	UR	CPRF	LDPR	JR	Others	Undecided	Abstention	Lead
22 November-5 December 2018	Black Cub	37.4%	21.8%	23.2%	5.7%	—	—	—	14.2%
18 September 2016	Election result	44.69%	14.84%	19.15%	7.72%	11.25%			25.54%

=== Rostov Oblast ===
Fieldwork date	Polling firm	UR	CPRF	LDPR	JR	Others	Undecided	Abstention	Lead
9 September 2018	Regional election	57.0%	17.1%	9.9%	7.1%	6.9%	—	—	39.9%
27-31 August 2018	FOM	29%	13%	8%	3%	1%	25%	18%	16%
18 September 2016	Election result	58.79%	13.60%	12.49%	4.34%	9.21%			45.19%

=== Tula Oblast ===
Fieldwork date	Polling firm	UR	CPRF	LDPR	JR	Others	Undecided	Abstention	Lead
8 September 2019	Regional election	50.3%	14.5%	10.4%	7.1%	13.9%	—	—	35.8%
26–29 March 2019	CIPKR	40%	14%	8%	2%	12%	14%	7%	26%
18 September 2016	Election result	53.02%	14.41%	14.28%	4.47%	11.95%			38.61%

=== Sakhalin Oblast ===
Fieldwork date	Polling firm	UR	CPRF	LDPR	JR	Others	Undecided	Abstention	Lead
22 November-5 December 2018	Black Cub	30.6%	18.5%	13.0%	4.0%	—	—	—	12.1%
10 September 2017	Regional election	44.6%	16.5%	13.0%	4.5%	16.8%	—	—	28.1%
18 September 2016	Election result	45.44%	15.44%	20.03%	3.40%	13.34%			25.41%

=== Jewish Autonomous Oblast ===
Fieldwork date	Polling firm	UR	CPRF	LDPR	JR	Others	Undecided	Abstention	Lead
22 November-5 December 2018	Black Cub	32.4%	17.0%	30.1%	4.5%	—	—	—	2.3%
18 September 2016	Election result	45.03%	17.11%	21.90%	2.80%	9.64%			23.13%

=== Chukotka Autonomous Okrug ===
Fieldwork date	Polling firm	UR	CPRF	LDPR	JR	Others	Undecided	Abstention	Lead
22 November-5 December 2018	Black Cub	40.3%	20.2%	21.1%	3.6%	—	—	—	19.2%
18 September 2016	Election result	58.80%	7.76%	17.34%	3.13%	8.50%			41.64%

=== Moscow ===
Fieldwork date	Polling firm	UR	CPRF	LDPR	Yabloko	JR	PoR	PG	Rodina	RPPJ	PARNAS	CR	Greens	CP	CP	NP	Others	Undecided	Abstention	Lead
13 September 2021	INSOMAR	36.2%	18.5%	9.5%	–	7.8%		–	–	–	–	–	3.1%	–	–	5.3%	–	–	–	17.7%
26 April 2021	Levada Center	15%	6%	10%	5%	6%		–	1%	1%	–	1%	1%	–	–	–	5%	21%	25%	5%
April 2021	Russian Field	22.9%	5.8%	10.1%	4.2%	4.0%	–	–	–	–	–	–	–	–	–	–	9.1%	14.9%	28.1%	12.8%
18 August 2020	Levada Center	24%	10%	14%	3%	2%	<1%	<1%	<1%	1%	<1%	1%	2%	<1%	<1%	–	3%	13%	21%	10%
29 April 2019	Levada Center	25%	12%	8%	2%	4%	1%	<1%	<1%	2%	<1%	2%	1%	<1%	<1%	–	2%	15%	25%	13%
14 October 2018	Levada Center	25%	10%	9%	2%	4%	–	1%	1%	2%	1%	1%	1%	–	–	–	1%	15%	26%	15%
18 September 2016	Election result	37.76%	13.90%	13.09%	9.53%	6.54%	0.60%	3.55%	3.52%	2.93%	2.62%	1.97%	1.77%	0.32%	0.25%	New	1.65%		(64.8%)	23.86%

=== Sevastopol ===
Fieldwork date	Polling firm	UR	CPRF	LDPR	JR	Others	Undecided	Abstention	Lead
8 September 2019	Regional election	38.5%	18.7%	18.6%	8.8%	10.7%	—	—	30%
26–29 March 2019	CIPKR	39%	17%	9%	2%	5%	15%	8%	22%
18 September 2016	Election result	53.78%	12.07%	11.14%	5.09%	11.23%			41.71%

=== Saint Petersburg ===
Fieldwork date	Polling firm	UR	CPRF	LDPR	SRZP	Yabloko	Rodina	NP	Others	Undecided	Abstention	Lead
10–12 September 2021	ANO ISOGOR	29.9%	16.3%	6.8%	11.4%	3.7%	5%	5%	—	21.5%	—	13.6%
June 2021	SPbSNIC	43%	20%	8%	3%	20%	—	—	1%	—	—	9%
18 September 2016	Election result	39.71%	11.31%	11.36%	6.90%	9.08%	2.69%	New	15.08%			28.35%

== Local polls ==
=== Chelyabinsk ===
Fieldwork date	Polling firm	UR	CPRF	LDPR	JR	Others	Undecided	Abstention	Lead
28 September - 3 October 2018	RANEPA Chelyabinsk	19.0%	7.3%	5.8%	5.0%	1.3%	10.5%	51.3%	11.7%

== Polls by social groups ==
=== Entrepreneurs ===
Fieldwork date	Polling firm	UR	CPRF	LDPR	SRPZP	CR	Yabloko	RPPSJ	Rodina	PG	RPFJ	NP	GA	Undecided	Abstention	Lead
May 2021	Platforma	31.2%	15.2%	13.0%	13.0%	4.3%	4.3%	6.5%	2.2%	1.4%	2.9%	5.8%	0.0%	—	—	16.0%
