= 2018 Vladimir Oblast Legislative Assembly election =

Local election in Russia

- 9 September 2018

All 38 seats in the Legislative Assembly 20 seats needed for a majority
- Turnout: 32.90%
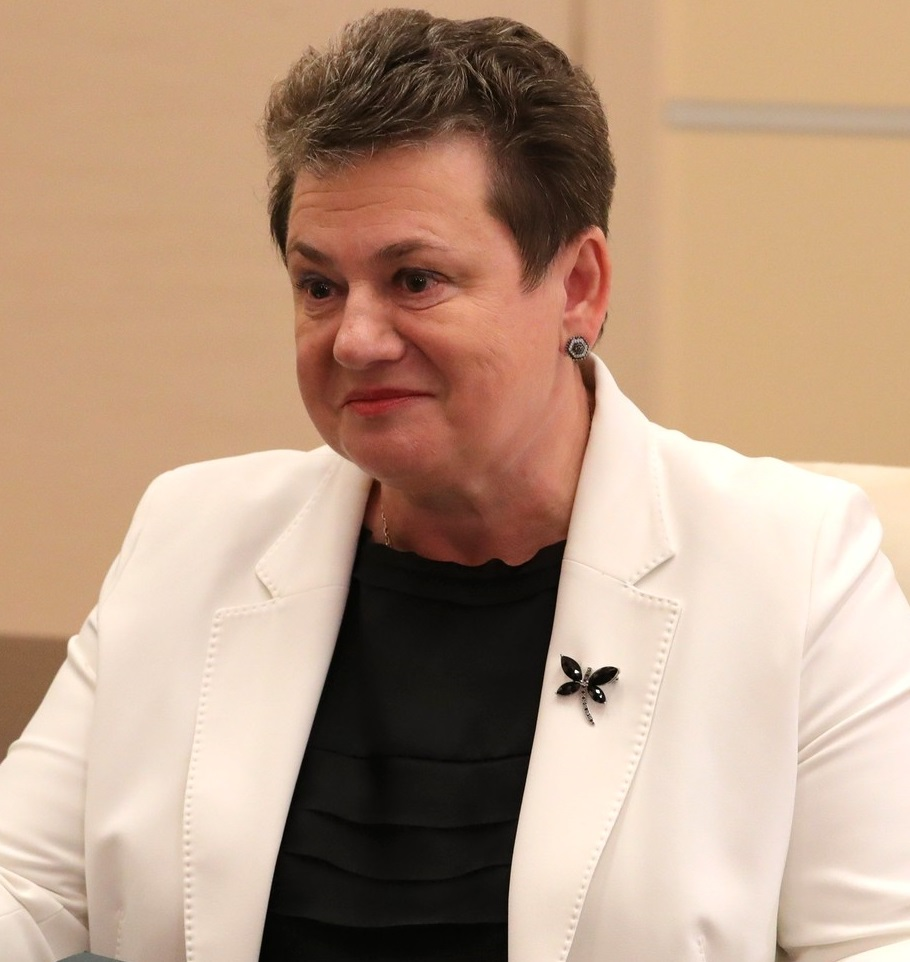

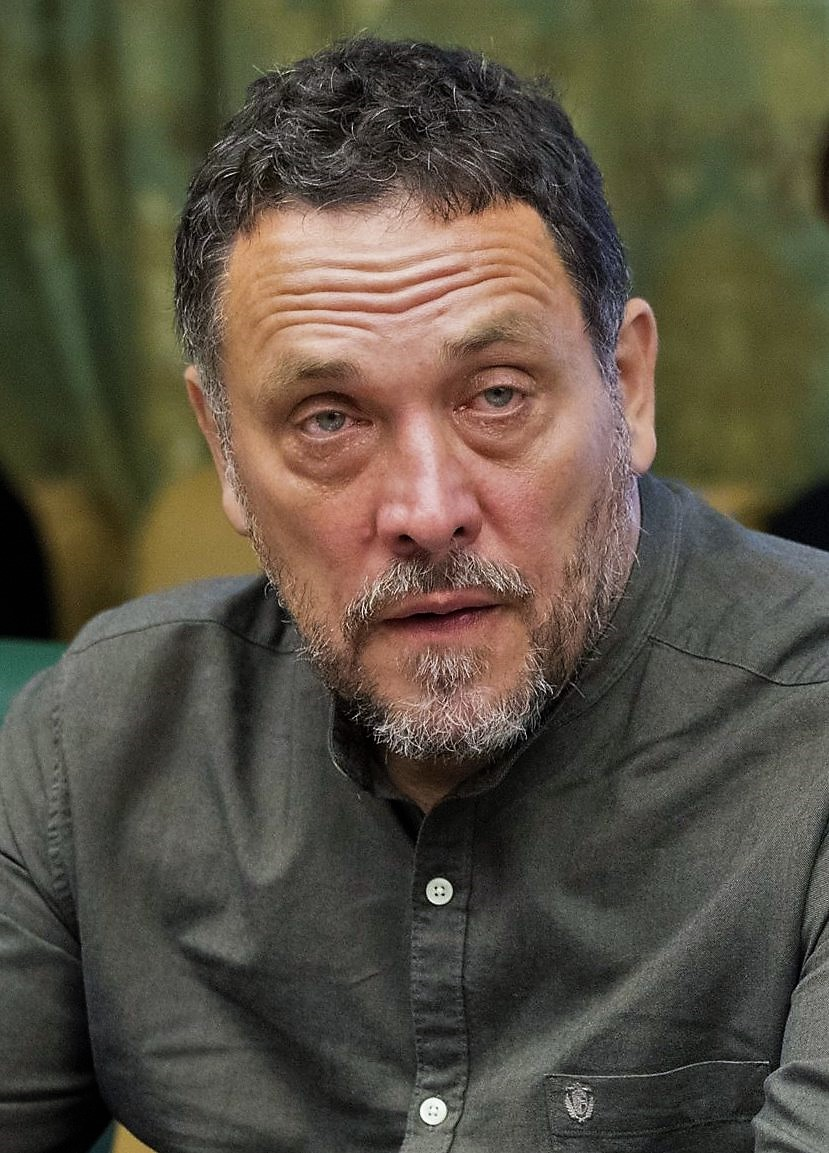

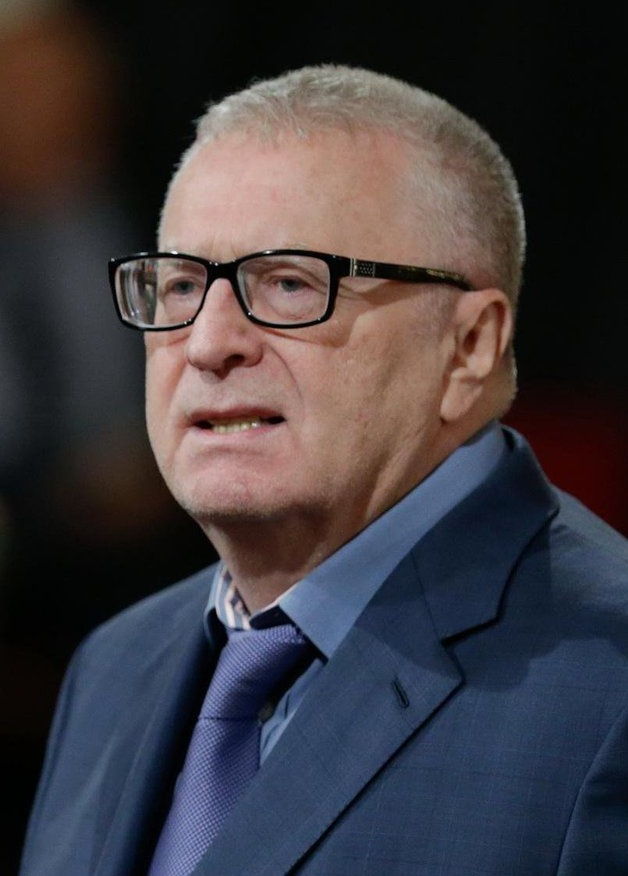
	First party	Second party	Third party
Leader	Svetlana Orlova	Maxim Shevchenko	Vladimir Zhirinovsky
Party	United Russia	CPRF	LDPR
Last election	32 seats, 44.33%	3 seats, 13.54%	2 seats, 9.92%
Seats won	23	7	4
Seat change	▼9	▲4	▲2
Popular vote	110,117	88,122	77,443
Percentage	29.57%	23.66%	20.80%
- Results by oblast-wide constituency (left) and single-member constituencies (right)
Chairman before election
Vladimir Kiselyov
United Russia
Elected Chairman
Vladimir Kiselyov
United Russia

Elections to the Legislative Assembly of Vladimir Oblast were held on 9 September 2018, on the common election day, to elect all 38 members of the seventh convocation of the Legislative Assembly. The elections were held simultaneously with the first round of the 2018 Vladimir Oblast gubernatorial election.

The Legislative Assembly was elected for a five-year term using parallel voting. 19 deputies were elected by party-list proportional representation in a single oblast-wide constituency, while the other 19 were elected in single-member districts using first-past-the-post voting. Parties were required to receive at least 5% of the party-list vote to participate in the allocation of proportional seats.

United Russia remained the largest party in the Legislative Assembly and retained its absolute majority, although its representation fell from 32 to 23 seats. The Communist Party of the Russian Federation increased its representation from three to seven seats, while the Liberal Democratic Party of Russia doubled its representation from two to four seats. A Just Russia won three seats and the Communist Party of Social Justice entered the regional parliament for the first time with one seat.

== Electoral system ==
The 38 members of the Legislative Assembly were elected under a mixed electoral system. Half of the chamber, 19 deputies, was elected from a single oblast-wide constituency by proportional representation. The remaining 19 deputies were elected in single-member constituencies by plurality voting.

A party list was required to receive at least 5% of the vote to qualify for the distribution of proportional seats. As of 1 July 2018, 1,130,678 voters were registered in Vladimir Oblast.

== Participating parties ==
Seven party lists were registered to contest the oblast-wide constituency. Ten parties initially nominated lists, but the lists submitted by Communists of Russia, Rodina and People Against Corruption were denied registration.

The registered party lists were headed by regional governor Svetlana Orlova for United Russia, journalist Maxim Shevchenko for the Communist Party, federal party leader Vladimir Zhirinovsky for the Liberal Democratic Party, Sergey Biryukov for A Just Russia, Ivan Altukhov for the Communist Party of Social Justice, Andrey Shirokov for the Party of Pensioners and Dmitry Kushpita for Yabloko.

Party	No. 1 on party list	2013 election	
United Russia	Svetlana Orlova	44.33%	32 / 38
Communist Party	Maxim Shevchenko	13.54%	3 / 38
Liberal Democratic Party	Vladimir Zhirinovsky	9.92%	2 / 38
A Just Russia	Sergey Biryukov	6.96%	1 / 38
Communist Party of Social Justice	Ivan Altukhov	3.73%	0 / 38
Party of Pensioners	Andrey Shirokov	4.22%	0 / 38
Yabloko	Dmitry Kushpita	1.75%	0 / 38

In the single-member constituencies, 84 candidates were initially nominated. After withdrawals and registration refusals, 74 candidates were registered, all of whom had been nominated by political parties.

== Opinion polls ==
Date	Poll source	UR	LDPR	CPRF	JR	Yabloko	Pensioners	CPSJ	Spoil ballot	Abstention	Undecided
15–16 August 2018	CIPKR	33%	17%	22%	7%	3%	2%		1%	5%	10%
27–31 August 2018	FOM	30%	13%	9%	2%	1%	1%	0%	2%	15%	28%

== Results ==
United Russia received the largest share of the party-list vote with 29.57%, a decline of 14.76 percentage points compared with 2013. The Communist Party finished second with 23.66%, followed by the Liberal Democratic Party with 20.80%. A Just Russia received 10.20% and the Communist Party of Social Justice received 6.14%, allowing five parties to take part in the distribution of proportional seats.

The Party of Pensioners received 4.38% and Yabloko received 1.42%, leaving both parties below the 5% threshold.

United Russia won 16 of the 19 single-member constituencies. The Communist Party won two constituencies and A Just Russia won one. Combined with the proportional seats, United Russia won 23 seats and retained an absolute majority in the Legislative Assembly.

Party	Party list				SMC	Total result	
Party	Votes	%	±pp	Seats	Seats	Seats	+/–
United Russia	110,117	29.57%	▼14.76	7	16	23	▼9
Communist Party	88,122	23.66%	▲10.12	5	2	7	▲4
Liberal Democratic Party	77,443	20.80%	▲10.88	4	0	4	▲2
A Just Russia	37,990	10.20%	▲3.24	2	1	3	▲2
Communist Party of Social Justice	22,873	6.14%	▲2.41	1	0	1	▲1
Party of Pensioners	16,310	4.38%	▲0.16	0	0	0	Steady
Yabloko	5,276	1.42%	▼0.33	0	0	0	Steady
Valid votes	358,131	96.17%					
Invalid/blank votes	14,272	3.83%					
Total	372,403	100%		19	19	38	Steady
Registered voters/turnout	1,131,807	32.90%	▲4.38				
Source: Election Commission of Vladimir Oblast

== Aftermath ==
The first sitting of the seventh convocation was held on 28 September 2018. Incumbent chairman Vladimir Kiselyov of United Russia was re-elected as Chairman of the Legislative Assembly. Kiselyov received 27 votes, while Communist Party candidate Sergey Kazakov received seven.

Five political parties were represented in the new Legislative Assembly: United Russia with 23 deputies, the Communist Party with seven, the Liberal Democratic Party with four, A Just Russia with three and the Communist Party of Social Justice with one.
