= Central constituency (Moscow) =

Russian legislative constituency

Central single-member constituency
- Constituency of the Russian State Duma

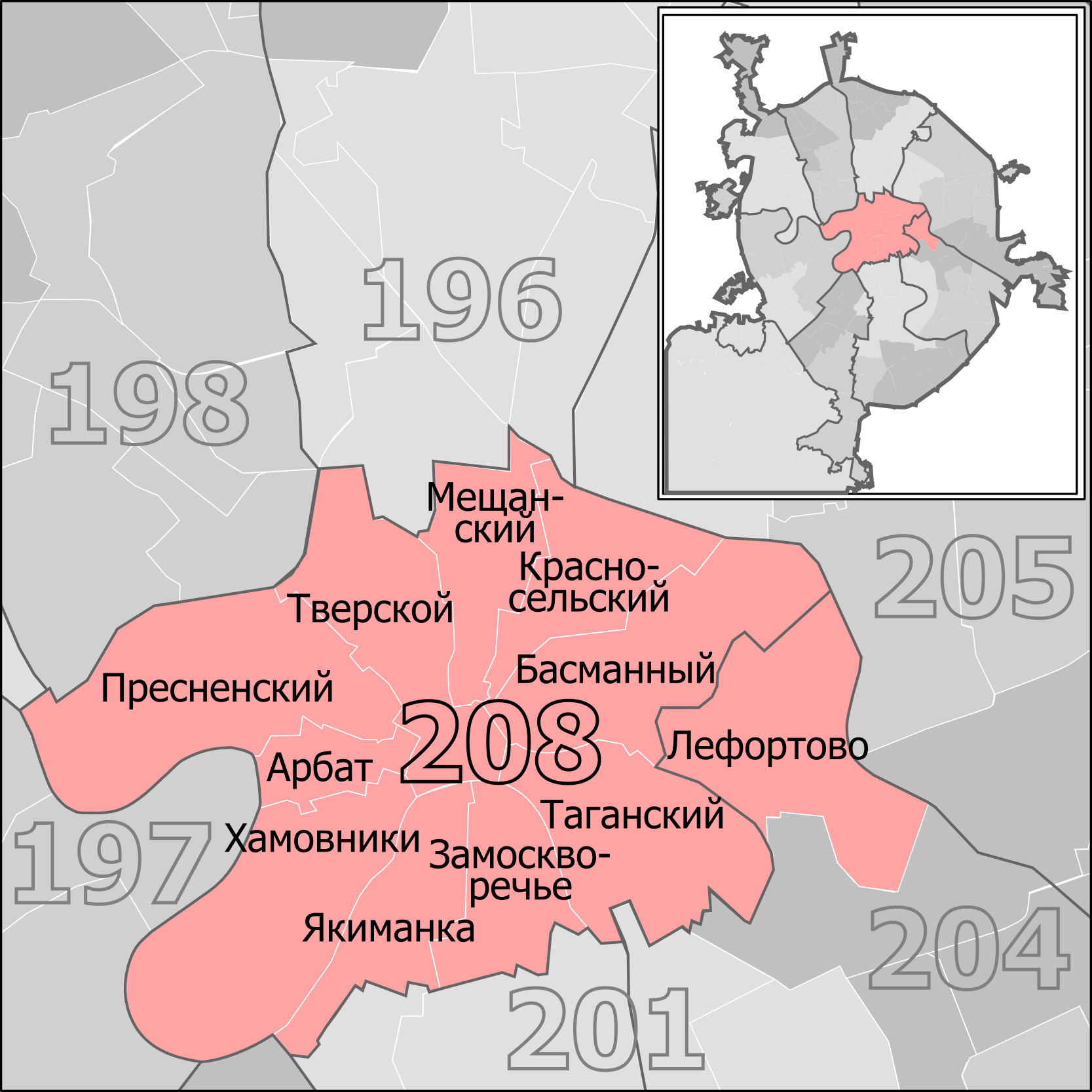
- Constituency boundaries since 2016
- Deputy: Oleg Leonov; United Russia
- Federal subject: Moscow
- Districts: Central AO, South-Eastern AO (Lefortovo)
- Voters: 491,569 (2026)

The Central constituency (No.207 (Note: No.202 in 1993-2007, No.208 in 2016–2026)) is a Russian legislative constituency in Moscow. The constituency covers all of Central Moscow and Lefortovo District to its immediate east.

The constituency has been represented since 2026 by United Russia deputy Oleg Leonov, former Vedomosti newspaper owner and strategic consultant, who won the open seat, succeeding one-term New People incumbent Oleg Leonov.

== Boundaries ==
1993–1995: Central Administrative Okrug (Arbat District, Basmanny District, Khamovniki District, Krasnoselsky District, Meshchansky District, Presnensky District, Tagansky District, Tverskoy District)
The constituency was based entirely within Central Moscow, covering its part on the left bank of Moskva River.

1995–2003: Central Administrative Okrug (Arbat District, Basmanny District, Khamovniki District, Kitay-gorod, (Note: merged with Tverskoy District in 2002) Krasnoselsky District, Meshchansky District, Presnensky District, Tverskoy District, Yakimanka District, Zamoskvorechye District)
After the 1995 redistricting the constituency was significantly changed, losing Tagansky District to Avtozavodsky constituency. This seat instead gained Yakimanka, Zamoskvorechye from the former Nagatinsky constituency.

2003–2007: Central Administrative Okrug (Arbat District, Basmanny District, Khamovniki District, Kitay-gorod, Krasnoselsky District, Meshchansky District, Presnensky District, Tagansky District, Tverskoy District, Yakimanka District, Zamoskvorechye District)
Following the 2003 redistricting the constituency was altered, re-gaining Tagansky District from Avtozavodsky constituency and covering all of Central Moscow.

2016–present: Central Administrative Okrug (Arbat District, Basmanny District, Khamovniki District, Kitay-gorod, Krasnoselsky District, Meshchansky District, Presnensky District, Tagansky District, Tverskoy District, Yakimanka District, Zamoskvorechye District), South-Eastern Administrative Okrug (Lefortovo)
The constituency was re-created for the 2016 election and retained all of its former territory as well as gained Lefortovo in South-Eastern Moscow from the former Avtozavodsky constituency.

== Members elected ==
Election	Member	Party
1993	Artyom Tarasov	Independent
1995	Nikolay Gonchar	Independent
1999	Nikolay Gonchar	Independent
2003	Nikolay Gonchar	Independent
2007	Proportional representation - no election by constituency	
2011	Proportional representation - no election by constituency	
2016	Nikolay Gonchar	United Russia
2021	Oleg Leonov	Independent
2026	Oleg Leonov	United Russia

== Election results ==
=== 1993 ===
Summary of the 12 December 1993 Russian legislative election in the Central constituency
Candidate	Party	Votes	%
Artyom Tarasov	Independent	37,966	14.12%
Fyodor Shelov-Kovedyayev	Independent	37,002	13.76%
Aleksandr Minkin	Independent	31,704	11.79%
Aleksandr Krasnov	Independent	24,945	9.28%
Aleksandr Frolov	Communist Party	14,358	5.34%
Anatoly Basargin	Independent	14,039	5.22%
Valery Kubarev	Independent	8,762	3.26%
Vera Balakireva	Russian Democratic Reform Movement	8,282	3.08%
Valery Fadeyev	Independent	7,571	2.82%
Vladimir Knyazev	Kedr	5,954	2.21%
Aleksey Zuyev	Liberal Democratic Party	5,544	2.06%
Konstantin Petrosyan	Yavlinky–Boldyrev–Lukin	4,560	1.70%
Aleksandr Kotenyov	Independent	4,376	1.63%
Sergey Vladimirov	Civic Union	3,415	1.27%
Yevgeny Vostrikov	Independent	3,135	1.17%
Vladimir Kozhemyakin	Party of Russian Unity and Accord	2,685	1.00%
against all		40,953	15.23%
Total		268,877	100%

=== 1995 ===
Summary of the 17 December 1995 Russian legislative election in the Central constituency
Candidate	Party	Votes	%
Nikolay Gonchar	Independent	74,175	25.85%
Fyodor Shelov-Kovedyayev	Democratic Choice of Russia – United Democrats	33,631	11.72%
Mikhail Motorin	Yabloko	27,551	9.60%
Aleksey Podberezkin	Communist Party	26,811	9.34%
Aleksandr Krasnov	Stanislav Govorukhin Bloc	16,482	5.74%
Sergey Goncharov	Congress of Russian Communities	16,051	5.59%
Andrey Nuykin	Independent	10,813	3.77%
Tatyana Krylova	Independent	9,080	3.16%
Galina Khovanskaya	Independent	7,925	2.76%
Valery Belousov	Independent	6,490	2.26%
Boris Uvarov	Power to the People!	5,967	2.08%
Andrey Shestakov	Independent	5,030	1.75%
Andrey Strygin	Liberal Democratic Party	3,816	1.33%
Nikolay Chigarentsev	Independent	3,357	1.17%
Sergey Chernyakhovsky	Communists and Working Russia - for the Soviet Union	3,349	1.17%
Yevgeny Shvedov	Independent	2,285	0.80%
Sergey Drogush	Independent	1,174	0.41%
Igor Brumel	Independent	1,044	0.36%
against all		26,975	9.40%
Total		286,917	100%

=== 1999 ===
Summary of the 19 December 1999 Russian legislative election in the Central constituency
Candidate	Party	Votes	%
Nikolay Gonchar (incumbent)	Independent	88,456	32.24%
Aleksandr Minkin	Independent	65,644	23.92%
Alla Gerber	Union of Right Forces	31,048	11.32%
Aleksey Rogozhin	Independent	14,662	5.34%
Aleksey Podberezkin	Spiritual Heritage	12,601	4.59%
Sergey Ruzavin	Independent	11,055	4.03%
Gennady Bulgakov	Liberal Democratic Party	4,175	1.52%
Valery Bobkov	Independent	3,399	1.24%
Sergey Shevchenko	Independent	3,095	1.13%
Grigory Loza	Russian Socialist Party	2,783	1.01%
against all		32,151	11.72%
Total		274,390	100%

=== 2003 ===
Summary of the 7 December 2003 Russian legislative election in the Central constituency
Candidate	Party	Votes	%
Nikolay Gonchar (incumbent)	Independent	97,066	36.57%
Aleksandr Pleshakov	Independent	34,860	13.13%
Olga Andronova	Rodina	28,780	10.84%
Yelena Karpukhina	Communist Party	26,471	9.97%
Aleksandr Russky	Independent	5,837	2.20%
Boris Pashintsev	Independent	4,789	1.80%
Igor Vashurkin	Great Russia – Eurasian Union	3,848	1.45%
Aleksandr Kuznetsov	United Russian Party Rus'	3,848	1.45%
against all		56,489	21.28%
Total		266,649	100%

=== 2016 ===
Summary of the 18 September 2016 Russian legislative election in the Central constituency
Candidate	Party	Votes	%
Nikolay Gonchar	United Russia	57,110	34.25%
Pavel Tarasov	Communist Party	21,442	12.86%
Andrey Zubov	People's Freedom Party	18,789	11.27%
Maria Baronova	Independent	13,197	7.92%
Mikhail Degtyarev	Liberal Democratic Party	12,573	7.54%
Kristina Simonyan	A Just Russia	8,095	4.86%
Ksenia Sokolova	Party of Growth	6,912	4.15%
Maria Katasonova	Rodina	6,569	3.94%
Dmitry Zakharov	Communists of Russia	4,956	2.97%
Anton Umnikov	The Greens	4,125	2.47%
Andrey Rudenko	Civic Platform	3,160	1.90%
Oleg Eston	Patriots of Russia	2,744	1.65%
Aleksey Mikhaylov	Civilian Power	2,338	1.40%
Total		166,733	100%

=== 2021 ===
Results by district: Oleg Leonov: 20–30% 30–40%; Sergey Mitrokhin: 20–30% 30–40%; Magomet Yandiev: 30–40%

Summary of the 17-19 September 2021 Russian legislative election in the Central constituency
Candidate	Party	Votes	%
Oleg Leonov	Independent	57,505	26.28%
Sergey Mitrokhin	Yabloko	47,815	21.85%
Nina Ostanina	Communist Party	22,146	10.12%
Maksim Shevchenko	Russian Party of Freedom and Justice	13,961	6.38%
Andrey Shirokov	Party of Pensioners	13,935	6.37%
Tatyana Vinnitskaya	New People	13,787	6.30%
Magomet Yandiev	A Just Russia — For Truth	12,979	5.93%
Dmitry Koshlakov-Krestovsky	Liberal Democratic Party	11,533	5.28%
Dmitry Zakharov	Communists of Russia	7,411	3.39%
Ketevan Kharaidze	Green Alternative	5,745	2.63%
Yakov Yakubovich	Party of Growth	4,219	1.93%
Anatoly Yushin	Civic Platform	2,307	1.05%
Total		218,839	100%

=== 2026 ===
Summary of the 18-20 September 2026 Russian legislative election in the Central constituency
Candidate	Party	Votes	%
Oleg Leonov	United Russia	91,311	39.05%
Sergey Mitrokhin	Yabloko	35,360	15.12%
Andrey Voronkov	Communist Party	31,400	13.43%
Maria Chuprina	New People	25,025	10.70%
Roman Krastelev	Liberal Democratic Party	17,749	7.59%
Ilya Sviridov	A Just Russia	16,102	6.89%
Irina Loye	The Greens	7,669	3.28%
Pavel Shtefan	Communists of Russia	5,693	2.43%
Vitaly Semenenko	Party of Direct Democracy	2,080	0.89%
Total		233,831	100%
