= Sergey Mitrokhin =

Russian politician (born 1963)

- Сергей Митрохин
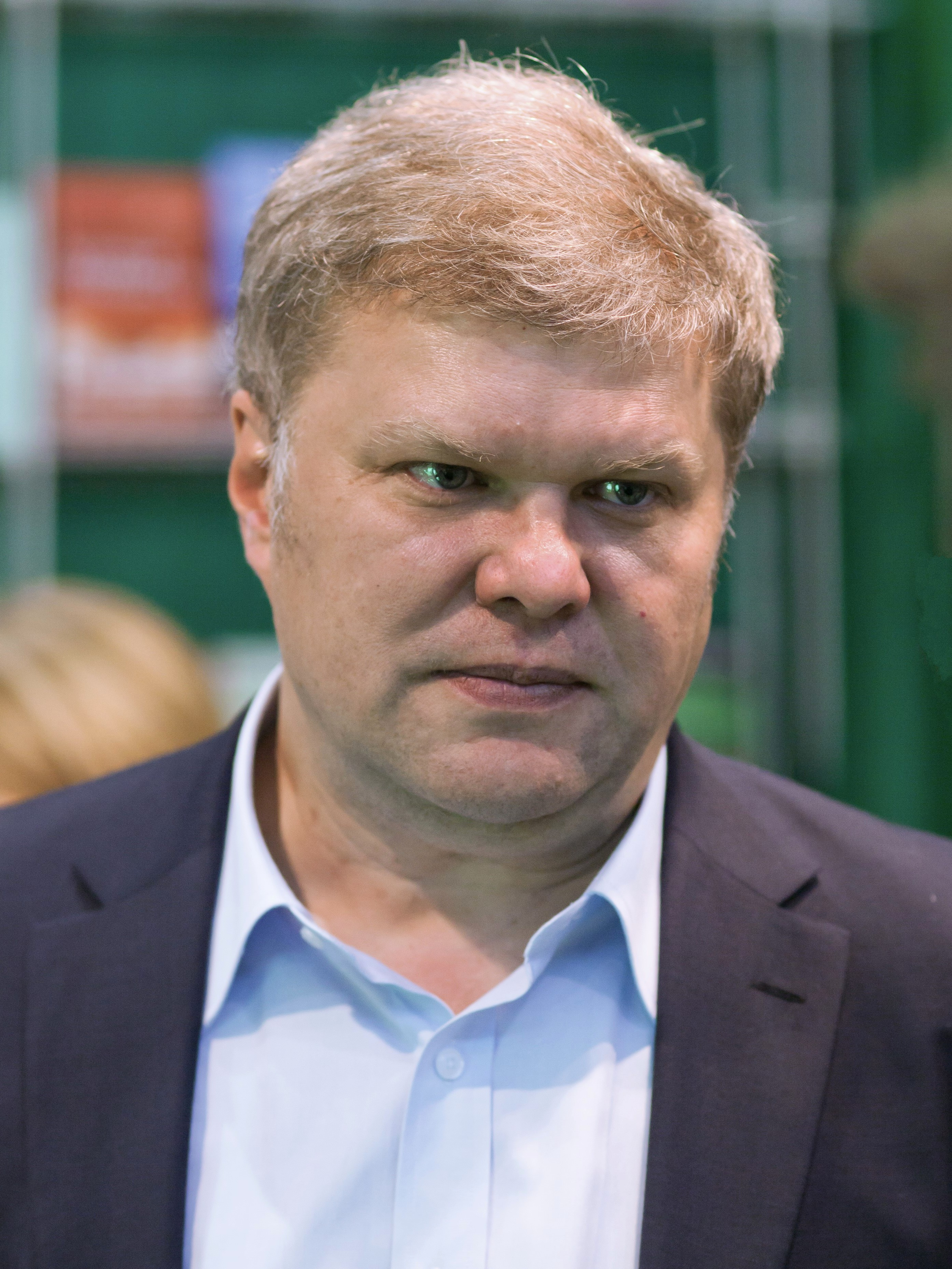
- Mitrokhin in 2013

Member of the Moscow City Duma
- In office 8 September 2019 – 18 September 2024
- In office 4 December 2005 – 11 October 2009

Chairman of Yabloko
- In office 21 June 2008 – 20 December 2015
- Preceded by: Grigory Yavlinsky
- Succeeded by: Emilia Slabunova

Deputy Leader of Yabloko
- In office 2001–2008

Member of the State Duma
- In office 11 May 1994 – 29 December 2003

Personal details
- Born: 20 May 1963 (age 63) Moscow, RSFSR, Soviet Union (now Russia)
- Party: Yabloko
- Children: 1 daughter (b. 2002)
- Education: Moscow Pedagogical State University
- Sergey Mitrokhin's voice recorded August 2013

Sergey Sergeyevich Mitrokhin (Russian: Серге́й Серге́евич Митро́хин; born 20 May 1963) is a Russian politician.

He is a former leader of the liberal Yabloko party. He was a member of the State Duma (1994–2003) and Moscow City Duma (2005–2009, 2019–2024). Mitrokhin studied at the Moscow State Pedagogical University and got his PhD in political science.

In 2014, he opposed the Kremlin's policy and the war against Ukraine.

== Political career ==
=== Chairman of Yabloko (2008-2015) ===
On 21–22 June 2008, at the 15th Congress of Yabloko, Sergei Mitrokhin was elected chairman of the party; his candidacy was supported by the former chairman Grigory Yavlinsky. 75 out of 127 delegates (60%) voted for Mitrokhin's candidacy. Together with Grigory Yavlinsky, Alexei Yablokov, Sergei Ivanenko, and Igor Artemyev, he joined the party's political committee.

On 11 June 2009, Mitrokhin handed over the anti-crisis plan developed by Yabloko to President Dmitry Medvedev.

In the Moscow City Duma elections in July 2009, Mitrokhin headed the Yabloko list. Yabloko gained 4.7%, thus failing to cross the electoral threshold. Only United Russia (66.2%, 32 seats) and the Communist Party of the Russian Federation (13.3% of the vote, 3 seats) entered the Moscow Duma. During the vote-counting period, Mitrokhin challenged the voting results at his polling station and achieved a vote recount; the local election commission head was suspended from work. According to the official protocol, at polling station No. 192 in the Khamovniki District, no vote was cast for Yabloko; however, Mitrokhin and his family voted for their party there. He turned to the Investigative Committee of the Russian Prosecutor's Office. However, the Investigative Committee did not initiate a criminal case for falsification of voting results since it did not see "direct intent aimed at distorting the results."

In August 2009, Mitrokhin opposed the site plan of Moscow, arguing that "the site plan was written in the interests of the commercial construction oligarchy, not Muscovites."

On 22 January 2010, at a meeting of the State Council of the Russian Federation, he accused United Russia of monopolizing the party system.

On 3 March 2010, Mitrokhin was detained at the "Churov, shave your beard!" rally.

In the fall of 2011, during the elections to the State Duma of the sixth convocation, Mitrokhin entered the Yabloko list as number two (Grigory Yavlinsky was number one). According to the results of the parliamentary elections held on 4 December 2011, Yabloko received 3.4% of the votes. Thus, the party did not overcome the 5% electoral threshold required to receive mandates, but it did overcome the 3% required to qualify for state funding.

On 16 June 2012, Mitrokhin was re-elected chairman of the Yabloko party. Party founder Grigory Yavlinsky lobbied for Mitrokhin's candidacy. 105 delegates voted for Mitrokhin; 21 against.

On 14 January 2013, Mitrokhin approved the exit of 13 members of the St. Petersburg branch from the party, including three deputies of the Legislative Assembly: Olga Galkina, Maxim Reznik, and Vyacheslav Notyag.

In June 2013, Mitrokhin was nominated by Yabloko as a candidate for the Moscow mayoral elections, which took place on 8 September, and was registered by the Moscow City Election Commission on 17 July. On 8 September 2013, on the single voting day, Mitrokhin took fourth place, gaining 3.5% of the votes.

== Electoral history ==
2019 Moscow City Duma election (43rd constituency)
Candidate	Party	Votes	%
Sergey Mitrokhin	Yabloko	16120	46.28%
Dmitry Koshlakov-Krestovsky	LDPR	7231	20.76%
Roman Klimentiev	CPRF	6529	18.74%
Evgeny Borovik	A Just Russia	4952	14.22%

2021 Russian legislative election (Central constituency)
Candidate	Party	Votes	%
Oleg Leonov	Independent	57,505	26.28%
Sergey Mitrokhin	Yabloko	47,815	21.85%
Nina Ostanina	Communist Party	22,146	10.12%
Maksim Shevchenko	Russian Party of Freedom and Justice	13,961	6.38%
Andrey Shirokov	Party of Pensioners	13,935	6.37%
Tatyana Vinnitskaya	New People	13,787	6.30%
Magomet Yandiev	A Just Russia — For Truth	12,979	5.93%
Dmitry Koshlakov-Krestovsky	Liberal Democratic Party	11,533	5.28%
Dmitry Zakharov	Communists of Russia	7,411	3.39%
Ketevan Kharaidze	Green Alternative	5,745	2.63%
Yakov Yakubovich	Party of Growth	4,219	1.93%
Anatoly Yushin	Civic Platform	2,307	1.05%
Total		218,839	100%
