= Oleg Leonov (politician) =

Russian public and political figure

Oleg Leonov MP
- Олег Леонов
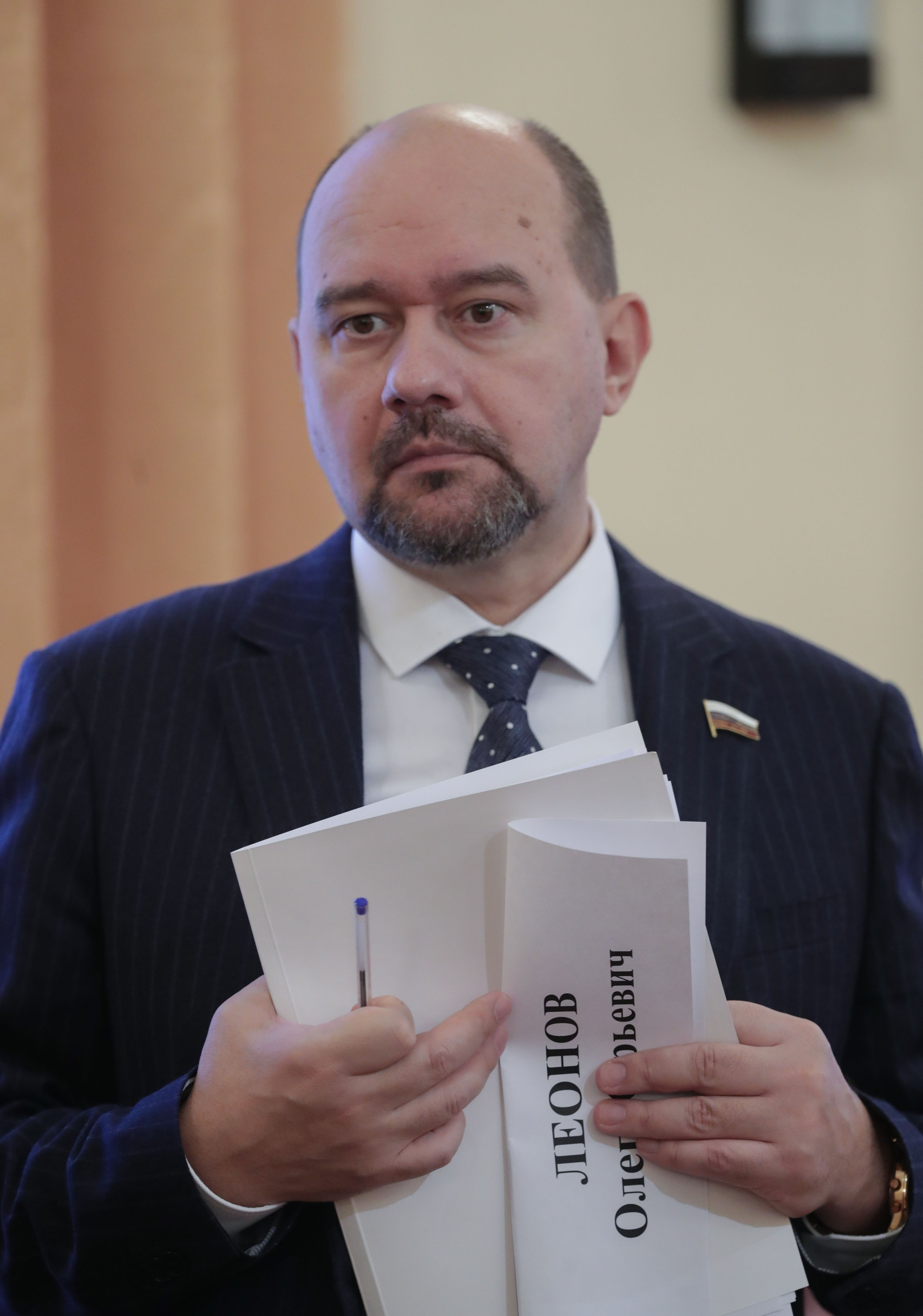

Member of the State Duma for Moscow
- Incumbent
- Assumed office 12 October 2021
- Preceded by: Nikolay Gonchar
- Constituency: Central Moscow (No. 208)

Personal details
- Born: 10 September 1970 (age 55) Moscow, RSFSR, USSR
- Party: New People (since 2021)
- Education: Moscow Automobile and Road Institute; Moscow State University

Oleg Yuryevich Leonov (Russian: Олег Юрьевич Леонов; born 10 September 1970) is a Russian activist and politician. He has been member of the State Duma for Moscow's Central constituency since the 2021 legislative election.

In 2021, Leonov ran for parliament as an independent, however was endorsed by Sergey Sobyanin. In October 2021, Leonov joined the New People parliamentary faction.

He was sanctioned by the United Kingdom from 11 March 2022 in relation to Russia's actions in Ukraine.

== Electoral history ==
2021 Russian legislative election (Central constituency)
Candidate	Party	Votes	%
Oleg Leonov	Independent	57,505	26.28%
Sergey Mitrokhin	Yabloko	47,815	21.85%
Nina Ostanina	Communist Party	22,146	10.12%
Maksim Shevchenko	Russian Party of Freedom and Justice	13,961	6.38%
Andrey Shirokov	Party of Pensioners	13,935	6.37%
Tatyana Vinnitskaya	New People	13,787	6.30%
Magomet Yandiev	A Just Russia — For Truth	12,979	5.93%
Dmitry Koshlakov-Krestovsky	Liberal Democratic Party	11,533	5.28%
Dmitry Zakharov	Communists of Russia	7,411	3.39%
Ketevan Kharaidze	Green Alternative	5,745	2.63%
Yakov Yakubovich	Party of Growth	4,219	1.93%
Anatoly Yushin	Civic Platform	2,307	1.05%
Total		218,839	100%
