= 2018 Russian elections =

← 2017	18 March (Presidential); 9 September (1st round of Single Voting Day); 16 and 23 September and 11 November (2nd round of Single Voting Day); 16 December (Special gubernatorial election in Primorsky Krai)	2019 →
- Gubernatorial Gubernatorial and legislative Legislative Two legislative elections (including one of another subject) Referendum

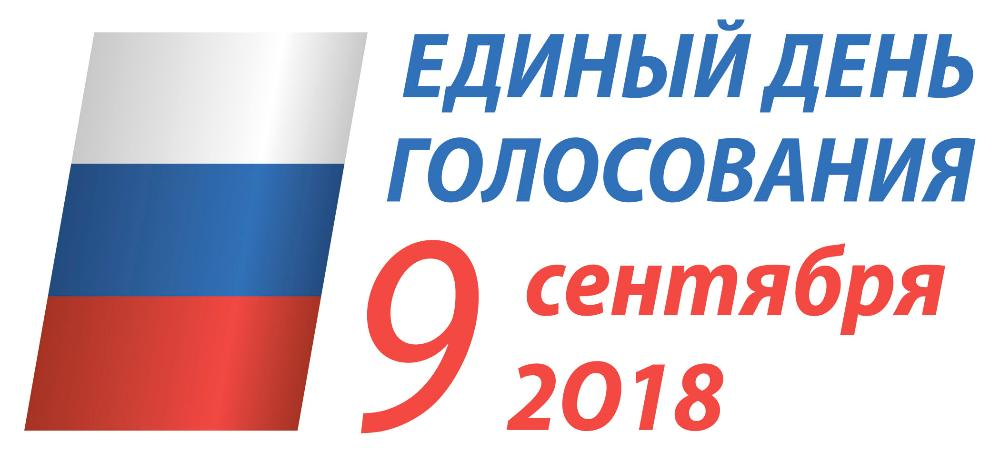
The logo of the voting day on September 9, 2018

Elections in the Russian Federation took place mostly on 9, 16 and 23 September, with the exception of the presidential election, which occurred on 18 March and a special gubernatorial election in Primorsky Krai, which occurred in December.

== Overview ==
Type of election	Quantity
Presidential	1
By-elections to the State Duma	7
Regional legislative election	17
Gubernatorial election	17
Regional referendums	1

== Presidential election ==
The presidential elections were held on 18 March.

Candidate	Party	Votes	%
Vladimir Putin	Independent	56,430,712	77.53
Pavel Grudinin	Communist Party	8,659,206	11.90
Vladimir Zhirinovsky	Liberal Democratic Party	4,154,985	5.71
Ksenia Sobchak	Civic Initiative	1,238,031	1.70
Grigory Yavlinsky	Yabloko	769,644	1.06
Boris Titov	Party of Growth	556,801	0.76
Maxim Suraykin	Communists of Russia	499,342	0.69
Sergey Baburin	Russian All-People's Union	479,013	0.66
Total		72,787,734	100.00
Valid votes		72,787,734	98.92
Invalid/blank votes		791,258	1.08
Total votes		73,578,992	100.00
Registered voters/turnout		109,008,428	67.50
Source: CEC

== By-elections to the State Duma ==
The by-elections in four constituencies took place on a single voting day on 9 September:

- 2018 Saratov by-election
- 2018 Zavolzhsky by-election
- 2018 Balashov by-election
- 2018 Nizhny Novgorod by-election

== Gubernatorial and head elections ==
Gubernatorial elections in 19 subjects of the Federation were held on 9 September. The second round, if necessary, will be held on September 23.

=== Direct elections ===
- 2018 Altai Krai gubernatorial elections
- 2018 Samara Oblast gubernatorial election
- 2018 Nizhny Novgorod Oblast gubernatorial election
- 2018 Krasnoyarsk Krai gubernatorial election
- September 2018 Primorsky Krai gubernatorial election (election result was cancelled and new elections were scheduled)
- December 2018 Primorsky Krai gubernatorial election
- 2018 Oryol Oblast gubernatorial election
- 2018 Novosibirsk Oblast gubernatorial election
- 2018 Omsk Oblast gubernatorial election
- 2018 Ivanovo Oblast gubernatorial election
- 2018 Pskov Oblast gubernatorial election
- 2018 Moscow Oblast gubernatorial election
- 2018 Khakas head election
- 2018 Magadan Oblast gubernatorial election
- 2018 Vladimir Oblast gubernatorial election
- 2018 Khabarovsk Krai gubernatorial election
- 2018 Moscow mayoral election
- 2018 Chukotka Autonomous Okrug gubernatorial election
- 2018 Voronezh Oblast gubernatorial election
- 2018 Kemerovo Oblast gubernatorial election

=== Indirect elections ===
- 2018 Nenets gubernatorial election
- 2018 Dagestani head election
- 2018 Ingush head election

== Regional elections ==
=== Autonomous republics and okrugs ===
- 2018 Bashkir parliamentary election
- 2018 Buryat parliamentary election
- 2018 Kalmyk parliamentary election
- 2018 Sakha parliamentary election
- 2018 Khakas parliamentary election
- 2018 Nenets parliamentary election

=== Oblasts and krais ===
- 2018 Zabaikalsky Krai Legislative Assembly election
- 2018 Arkhangelsk Oblast Assembly of Deputies election
- 2018 Vladimir Oblast Legislative Assembly election
- 2018 Ivanovo Oblast Duma election
- 2018 Irkutsk Oblast Legislative Assembly election
- 2018 Kemerovo Oblast Council of People's Deputies election
- 2018 Rostov Oblast Legislative Assembly election
- 2018 Smolensk Oblast Duma election
- 2018 Ulyanovsk Oblast Legislative Assembly election
- 2018 Yaroslavl Oblast Duma election

== Regional referendums ==
The referendum was held on 18 March.

- 2018 Volgograd Oblast time zone referendum
