= Maksim Shevchenko (journalist) =

Russian journalist (born 1966)

Maxim Shevchenko
- Максим Шевченко

Leader of the Russian Party of Freedom and Justice
- Incumbent
- Assumed office 31 March 2021
- Preceded by: Andrei Vladimirovich Bogdanov

Member of the Legislative Assembly of Vladimir Oblast
- Incumbent
- Assumed office 9 September 2018

Personal details
- Born: Maxim Leonardovich Shevchenko; February 22, 1966 (age 60) Moscow, USSR
- Citizenship: Soviet Union→Russia
- Party: Russian Party of Freedom and Justice
- Occupation: editor, journalist and presenter on television and radio in Russia

Maxim Shevchenko (born February 22, 1966) is an editor, journalist and presenter on television and radio in Russia, one of the leading Russian journalists and experts on ethno-cultural and religious policies. He is the leader of the opposition Russian Party of Freedom and Justice.

He is the presenter of the Russian nationalist socio-political TV programs Judge for yourself (Судите сами) and In the context (В контексте) on Channel One. He also presents Choice of faith, Strategy and other analytical programs on Radio Mayak, and live broadcasts on the Internet TV channel Russia.ru.

== Biography and journalistic activities ==
In 1990, he graduated from the Moscow Aviation Institute, "Engineering and system analysis of microelectronic devices." The second education (unfinished) - lecture of Oriental Studies at the Institute of Asian and African (Moscow State University).

In 1993–95 he worked as a teacher of the history of Russia and Western Europe in the first classical orthodox school "Radonezh-Yasnevo".

Since 1987 he has worked in independent journalism as a special correspondent for the independent newspapers Messenger of Christian Democracy (1987–91), as the head the Society and Culture department of The First of September (1992–95), as the project author and executive editor of application "NG-religion" and special correspondent on "hot spots" of Nezavisimaya Gazeta (1995–02), and as the project author and editor of the magazine Meaning. As a war correspondent for Nezavisimaya Gazeta, he worked in Afghanistan, Pakistan, Chechnya, Dagestan, Yugoslavia, Israel and Palestine.

In 2000, he created the Center for Strategic Studies of Religion and Politics of the Modern World, an independent non-profit expert-analytical community that connects and involves the experts and analysts specializing in the problems of contemporary political, socio-mythological and religious consciousness.

Since 2010 he has been editor-in-chief of Caucasian Policy, raising issues of direct relevance to the formation of the Caucasian policy in the federal center and the regions of the North Caucasus in Russia, focusing on critical social issues, refugee issues, problems associated with the violation and human rights, education, business development and local governance.

He is the founder of the radio station Ethno-radio, which started broadcasting on November 4, 2011.

Maxim Shevchenko tried to become deputy of Russian parliament as representative of Dagestan Republic. He also tried to become governor of Vladimir Oblast. Although he did not succeed in both cases he did make several changes in Russian politics. Both Dagestan president Ramazan Abdulatipov and Vladimir Oblast Svetlana Orlova left their offices. Maxim Shevchenko also supported Pavel Grudinin on general Presidential elections. Pavel Grudinin scored 2nd in the presidential race.

== Public activities ==
- In 2008 and 2010 years he was a Member of the Public Chamber of the Russian Federation:
  - Head of the working group on the development of social dialogue and civil society institutions in the Caucasus (2010);
  - Member of the Public Chamber's Commission on Ethnic Relations and Freedom of Conscience (2008 and 2010).
- A Member of the Board of Trustees of the Federal Public Portal "Project-Zakona.ru".
- A Member of the Anti-orange Committee.
