= Russian Party of Freedom and Justice =

Political party in Russia

Russian Party of Freedom and Justice Российская партия свободы и справедливости
- Abbreviation: RPSS
- Chairman: Konstantin Rykov
- Founder: Andrei Bogdanov
- Founded: 8 April 2012 (Communist Party of Social Justice) 28 March 2021 (Russian Party of Freedom and Justice)
- Headquarters: Moscow
- Ideology: Broad Socialism
- Political position: Centre-left
- Colours: Black; Red
- Seats in the State Duma: 0 / 450
- Seats in the Regional Parliaments: 0 / 3,928

Website
- my.rpss.ru

The Russian Party of Freedom and Justice (RPFJ) (Note: Russian: Российская партия свободы и справедливости (РПСС), romanized: Rossijskaja partija svobody i spravedlivosti (RPSS)) is a political party in Russia established and registered in 2012 as Communist Party of Social Justice.

== History ==
The party was created with the participation of the leader of the Democratic Party of Russia and politician Andrey Bogdanov.

In the 2013 elections in Volgograd, the party received 5.04% (9055 votes) breaking the five-percent threshold and received one seat in the city Parliament.

In 2014, Bogdanov became party leader, succeeding Yuri Morozov in this post. Andrei Brezhnev, grandson of General Secretary of the Communist Party of the Soviet Union Leonid Brezhnev, was elected First Secretary of the Central Committee of the party. In this year's election, Brezhnev was the candidate for the Parliament of Crimea and Sevastopol, but the party did not win any seats.

In April 2021, the party was renamed the Russian Party of Freedom and Justice. Konstantin Rykov became the chairman of the party, and Maksim Shevchenko became the leader.

On September 9, 2022, Maxim Shevchenko stated in his official Telegram channel that he no longer considers himself the leader of the RPSS and does not participate in the activities of a political party.

== Criticism ==
The Communist Party of the Russian Federation (CPRF) has accused the party of being a creation of the Kremlin and United Russia to siphon votes away from the CPRF.

CPRF points out that the CPSJ nominated candidates in single-mandate constituencies who had the same names as candidates from the CPRF, in order to confuse voters. Sergei Obukhov asserts that "it is not the CPSJ who stands behind the nomination of namesakes, but the administrative resource and the ruling party".

In 2020, the party nominated Gennady Shchadov in the elections for the governor of Irkutsk Oblast while Mikhail Shchapov was nominated from the CPRF.

Leader of the Left Front Sergei Udaltsov said that "the nature of the actions of the new party (RPSS) gives reason to think that they will be a spoiler party". He called Maksim Shevchenko's joining the RPSS "a betrayal of his comrades at a crucial moment" and considered possible his exclusion from Left Front.

== Former logos ==
Communist Party of Social Justice (2012–2017)

Communist Party of Social Justice (2017–2021)

Alternative logo (2021–)
