= 2022 Sakhalin Oblast Duma election =

- 9–11 September 2022
- Turnout: 29.67%
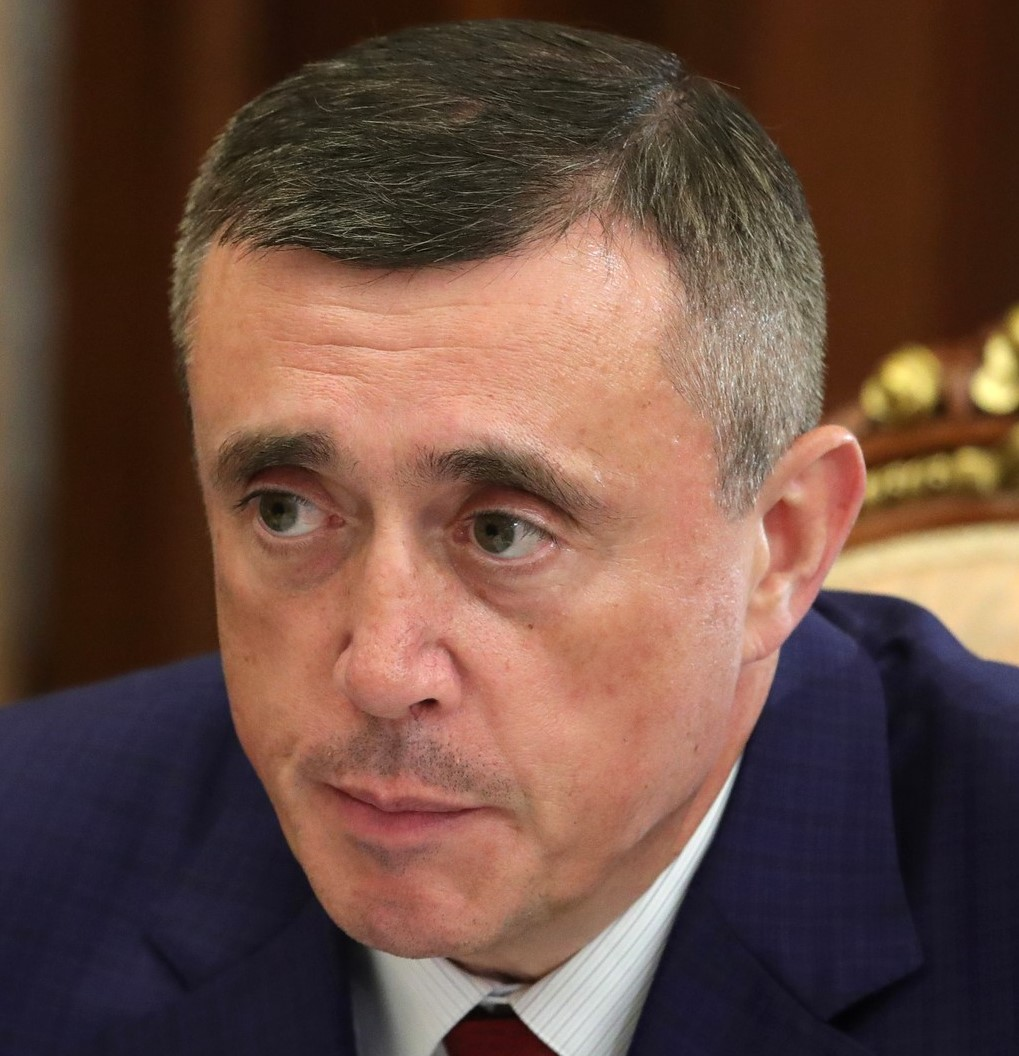

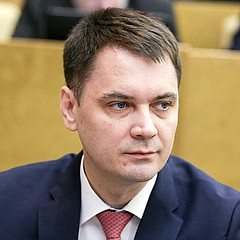
	Majority party	Minority party	Third party
			LDPR
Candidate	Valery Limarenko	Aleksey Korniyenko	Vitaly Baranov
Leader	Dmitry Medvedev	Gennady Zyuganov	Leonid Slutsky
Party	United Russia	CPRF	LDPR
Last election	19 seats, 44.64%	4 seats, 16.50%	2 seats, 13.02%
Seats won	21	2	1
Seat change	▲2	▼2	▼1
Popular vote	52,359	15,804	10,200
Percentage	47.20%	14.25%	9.19%
Swing	▲2.56%	▼2.25%	▼3.83%
	Fourth party	Fifth party	Sixth party
	NL	RPPSS	SR-ZP
Candidate	Roman Vedeneyev	Yury Vygolov	Vadim Politsinsky
Leader	Aleksey Nechayev	Vladimir Burakov	Sergey Mironov
Party	New People	Party of Pensioners	SR-ZP
Last election	Did not exist	Did not participate	0 seats, 4.54%
Seats won	2	1	1
Seat change	Did not exist	Did not participate	▲1
Popular vote	9,865	7,435	5,706
Percentage	8.89%	6.70%	5.14%
Swing	Did not exist	Did not participate	▲0.60%

The 2022 Sakhalin Oblast Duma election took place on 9–11 September 2022, on common election day. All 28 seats in the Oblast Duma were up for reelection.

== Electoral system ==
Under current election laws, the Oblast Duma is elected for a term of five years, with parallel voting. 10 seats are elected by party-list proportional representation with a 5% electoral threshold, with the other half elected in 18 single-member constituencies by first-past-the-post voting. Until 2022 the number of mandates allocated in proportional and majoritarian parts were standing at 14 each. Initially, 7 party list mandates and 21 single-member constituencies were proposed, however, this model was declared unconstitutional as it could create a situation, where there would be not enough seats for every qualified party. Seats in the proportional part are allocated using the Imperiali quota, modified to ensure that every party list, which passes the threshold, receives at least one mandate ("Tyumen method").

== Candidates ==
=== Party lists ===
To register regional lists of candidates, parties need to collect 0.5% of signatures of all registered voters in Sakhalin Oblast.

The following parties were relieved from the necessity to collect signatures:

- United Russia
- Communist Party of the Russian Federation
- A Just Russia — Patriots — For Truth
- Liberal Democratic Party of Russia
- New People
- Rodina
- Russian Party of Freedom and Justice
- Yabloko
- Communists of Russia

№	Party	Oblast-wide list	Candidates	Territorial groups	Status
1	Party of Pensioners	Yury Vygolov • Alla Lyubimova • Lidia Lazareva • Sergey Li • Armen Khachatryan	23	18	Registered
2	Liberal Democratic Party	Vitaly Baranov • Dmitry Fleyer • Anton Butov	38	18	Registered
3	A Just Russia — For Truth	Vadim Politsinsky • Natalya Zhdakayeva • Aleksandr Yalovoy • Aleksandr Anistratov • Anna Sokolovskaya	37	18	Registered
4	United Russia	Valery Limarenko • Andrey Khapochkin • Yevgenia Tuchkova • Yelena Kasyanova • Vitaly Gomilevsky	58	18	Registered
5	Communist Party	Aleksey Korniyenko • Pavel Ashikhmin • Mikhail Cherevik • Andrey Silenginsky	42	18	Registered
6	New People	Roman Vedeneyev • Ivan Butakov • Vladislav Glukhov • Ivan Rybakov • Aleksandr Borovikov	19	14	Registered
7	Communists of Russia	Dmitry Zenkin • Dmitry Karpov • Darya Sviridenko • Yelena Larkina • Aleksandr Zenkin	30	17	Registered
8	Rodina	Aleksandr Konkov • Viktor Sheybak • Andrey Yermakov • Yevgeny Peshkov • Aleksandr Afonichev	20	15	Registered
9	RPSS	Susanna Adrova • Dana Pantyukhina • Konstantin Bessonov • Nadezhda Smirnova • Yury Markov	22	17	Registered
	Civic Platform	Yevgeny Cherny • Anna Nikolskaya • Yelena Zapodoynikova	25	12	Failed to qualify
	Yabloko				Failed the certification

New People and RPPSS will take part in Sakhalin Oblast legislative election for the first time, while For Women of Russia and Patriots of Russia, who participated in the 2017 election, had been dissolved henceforth.

=== Single-mandate constituencies ===
18 single-mandate constituencies were formed in Sakhalin Oblast, an increase of 4 seats since last redistricting in 2017.

To register, candidates in single-mandate constituencies need to collect 3% of signatures of registered voters in the constituency.

Number of candidates in single-mandate constituencies
Party	Candidates	
Party	Nominated	Registered
United Russia	18	18
Communist Party	18	17
Liberal Democratic Party	17	16
A Just Russia — For Truth	18	18
New People	11	10
Communists of Russia	18	18
Rodina	18	17
RPSS	16	16
Party of Pensioners	4	3
Independent	4	0
Total	142	132

== Results ==
Summary of the 9–11 September 2022 Sakhalin Oblast Duma election results
Party	Party list					Constituency		Total	
Party	Votes	%	±pp	Seats	+/–	Seats	+/–	Seats	+/–
United Russia	52,359	47.20	▲2.56%	4	▼5	17	▲7	21	▲2
Communist Party	15,804	14.25	▼2.25%	2	▼1	0	▼1	2	▼2
Liberal Democratic Party	10,200	9.19	▼3.83%	1	▼1	0	Steady	1	▼1
New People	9,865	8.89	New	1	New	1	New	2	New
Party of Pensioners	7,435	6.70	New	1	New	0	New	1	New
A Just Russia — For Truth	5,706	5.14	▲0.60%	1	▲1	0	Steady	1	▲1
Communists of Russia	2,827	2.55	▼1.57%	0	Steady	0	Steady	0	Steady
RPSS	1,620	1.46	▼2.36%	0	Steady	0	Steady	0	Steady
Rodina	795	0.72	▼0.45%	0	Steady	0	Steady	0	Steady
Invalid ballots	4,325	3.90	▼0.63%	—	—	—	—	—	—
Total	110,936	100.00	—	10	▼4	18	▲4	28	Steady
Turnout	110,936	29.67	▲3.65%	—	—	—	—	—	—
Registered voters	373,907	100.00	—	—	—	—	—	—	—

Summary of the 9–11 September 2022 Sakhalin Oblast Duma election results by constituency
№	Candidate	Party	Votes	%
1	Aleksandr Grinberg	United Russia	2,582	57.49%
1	Pavel Solovov	Communist Party	444	9.89%
1	Marina De	New People	384	8.55%
1	Yevgeny Kovalenko	Communists of Russia	291	6.48%
1	Stanislav Yurin	A Just Russia — For Truth	268	5.97%
1	Maria Gavrilina	Rodina	185	4.12%
1	Georgy Kolyvanov	Russian Party of Freedom and Justice	89	1.98%
1	Total		4,491	100%
1	Source:			
2	Sergey Bondarev (incumbent)	United Russia	1,666	40.82%
2	Vladimir Fedorov	Communist Party	562	13.77%
2	Ivan Rybakov	New People	474	11.61%
2	Ivan Kovtun	A Just Russia — For Truth	380	9.31%
2	Roman Zarochintsev	Liberal Democratic Party	355	8.70%
2	Anna Mayboroda	Communists of Russia	198	4.85%
2	Larisa Bocharova	Russian Party of Freedom and Justice	152	3.72%
2	Mikhail Savelyev	Rodina	92	2.25%
2	Total		4,081	100%
2	Source:			
3	Irina Savitskaya	United Russia	1,448	31.54%
3	Svetlana Ivanova (incumbent)	Communist Party	1,125	24.50%
3	Ivan Kardash	A Just Russia — For Truth	585	12.74%
3	Ivan Pkhidenko	New People	478	10.41%
3	Aleksandr Razuvayev	Liberal Democratic Party	351	7.65%
3	Svetlana Ivanova	Communists of Russia	220	4.79%
3	Aleksandr Bogomolov	Rodina	134	2.92%
3	Ramil Abakarov	Russian Party of Freedom and Justice	72	1.57%
3	Total		4,591	100%
3	Source:			
4	Aleksandr Sharifulin (incumbent)	United Russia	1,939	38.89%
4	Susanna Adrova	Russian Party of Freedom and Justice	895	17.95%
4	Ivan Butov	Liberal Democratic Party	607	12.17%
4	Natalya Zhdakayeva	A Just Russia — For Truth	557	11.17%
4	Vyacheslav Kim	Communist Party	416	8.34%
4	Oksana Lysenko	Rodina	191	3.83%
4	Denis Kan	Communists of Russia	174	3.49%
4	Total		4,986	100%
4	Source:			
5	Andrey Khapochkin (incumbent)	United Russia	2,219	42.93%
5	Sergey Ponomaryov	Communist Party	1,006	19.46%
5	Sergey Bodry	Liberal Democratic Party	474	9.17%
5	Yury Vygolov	Party of Pensioners	367	7.10%
5	Dmitry Zenkin	Communists of Russia	283	5.47%
5	Sergey Abramov	Russian Party of Freedom and Justice	199	3.85%
5	Denis Shamazov	A Just Russia — For Truth	189	3.66%
5	Igor Pilyugov	Rodina	97	1.88%
5	Total		5,169	100%
5	Source:			
6	Roman Vedeneyev	New People	2,116	41.68%
6	Yury Alin	United Russia	1,111	21.88%
6	Irina Nikitina	Communist Party	557	10.97%
6	Semyon Zayka	Liberal Democratic Party	305	6.01%
6	Anna Sokolovskaya	A Just Russia — For Truth	294	5.79%
6	Irina Nikitina	Communists of Russia	259	5.10%
6	Konstantin Alekseyev	Rodina	129	2.54%
6	Yelena Reutskaya	Russian Party of Freedom and Justice	117	2.30%
6	Total		5,077	100%
6	Source:			
7	Yury Tsoi (incumbent)	United Russia	1,983	52.39%
7	Viktor Lapansky	Communist Party	460	12.15%
7	Anton Volokhov	New People	454	11.99%
7	Anna Fedorenko	Liberal Democratic Party	239	6.31%
7	Lev Shapovalov	A Just Russia — For Truth	236	6.24%
7	Mikhail Ivanchenko	Russian Party of Freedom and Justice	101	2.67%
7	Andrey Naumych	Communists of Russia	98	2.59%
7	Valentina Mochalova	Rodina	68	1.80%
7	Total		3,785	100%
7	Source:			
8	Artyom Kruglik	United Russia	3,007	47.13%
8	Nikolay Dolgikh	Communist Party	1,559	24.44%
8	Aleksandr Gusto	A Just Russia — For Truth	434	6.80%
8	Alla Lyubimova	Party of Pensioners	307	4.81%
8	Andrey Yermakov	Rodina	223	3.50%
8	Sergey Boldakov	Liberal Democratic Party	306	3.23%
8	Sergey Dolgikh	Communists of Russia	187	2.93%
8	Vladimir Borovikov	Russian Party of Freedom and Justice	140	2.19%
8	Total		6,380	100%
8	Source:			
9	Yury Im	United Russia	3,553	45.55%
9	Igor Yanchuk	Communist Party	1,288	16.51%
9	Oleg Denisov	Liberal Democratic Party	609	7.81%
9	Zhaneta Akentyeva	Party of Pensioners	595	7.63%
9	Nina Lankina	A Just Russia — For Truth	564	7.23%
9	Tikhon Skotnikov	Russian Party of Freedom and Justice	356	4.56%
9	Anton Stolbov	Communists of Russia	317	4.06%
9	Yury Rechkin	Rodina	125	1.60%
9	Total		7,801	100%
9	Source:			
10	Yevgeny Lotin (incumbent)	United Russia	6,505	67.04%
10	Andrey Yartsev	A Just Russia — For Truth	697	7.18%
10	Tatyana Litvinova	New People	534	5.50%
10	Stanislav Useinov	Communist Party	525	5.41%
10	Vladimir Romashkin	Liberal Democratic Party	477	4.92%
10	Boris Kuznetsov	Communists of Russia	329	3.39%
10	Maksim Shibarov	Russian Party of Freedom and Justice	186	1.92%
10	Mikhail Kulakov	Rodina	130	1.34%
10	Total		9,703	100%
10	Source:			
11	Aleksandr Doroshenko	United Russia	2,660	44.47%
11	Dmitry Fleyer	Liberal Democratic Party	869	14.53%
11	Aleksey Gerasimov	Communist Party	812	13.57%
11	Vasily Ryabov	New People	421	7.04%
11	Igor Fedotov	Communists of Russia	384	6.42%
11	Grigory Brandt	A Just Russia — For Truth	222	3.71%
11	Ruslan Kovkov	Rodina	123	2.06%
11	Total		5,982	100%
11	Source:			
12	Maksim Kozlov (incumbent)	United Russia	3,637	54.38%
12	Maksim Degtyarev	Liberal Democratic Party	875	13.08%
12	Ivan Smirnov	New People	673	10.06%
12	Mullo Mukhuddinov	Communists of Russia	322	4.81%
12	Vadim Politsinsky	A Just Russia — For Truth	273	4.08%
12	Andrey Pavlichenko	Russian Party of Freedom and Justice	166	2.48%
12	Aleksandr Kuimov	Rodina	89	1.33%
12	Total		6,688	100%
12	Source:			
13	Natalya Korshunova (incumbent)	United Russia	2,449	44.65%
13	Aleksandr Dydo	Communist Party	698	12.73%
13	Dmitry Shirokov	Liberal Democratic Party	664	12.11%
13	Sergey Uporov	A Just Russia — For Truth	608	11.08%
13	Aleksandr Borovikov	New People	319	5.82%
13	Vadim Vikhristyuk	Russian Party of Freedom and Justice	254	4.63%
13	Oleg Panasenko	Communists of Russia	169	3.08%
13	Yevgeny Lomako	Rodina	42	0.77%
13	Total		5,485	100%
13	Source:			
14	Natalya Zakharchuk	United Russia	2,782	39.58%
14	Sergey Stepanov	Communist Party	2,224	31.64%
14	Aleksandr Anistratov	A Just Russia — For Truth	729	10.37%
14	Vitaly Kryuchkov	Liberal Democratic Party	338	4.81%
14	Vasily Samchenko	Communists of Russia	284	4.04%
14	Yevgeny Tikhomirov	Russian Party of Freedom and Justice	257	3.66%
14	Total		7,029	100%
14	Source:			
15	Aleksandr Bolotnikov (incumbent)	United Russia	4,431	59.05%
15	Aleksandr Alyamkin	Communist Party	1,226	16.34%
15	Andrey Zykov	Communists of Russia	702	9.36%
15	Tatos Mkoyan	A Just Russia — For Truth	224	2.99%
15	Roman Mozzhukhin	Russian Party of Freedom and Justice	214	2.85%
15	Viktor Sheybak	Rodina	139	1.85%
15	Total		7,504	100%
15	Source:			
16	Aleksandr Radomsky	United Russia	3,013	55.24%
16	Kirill Verny	Communist Party	854	15.66%
16	Nadezhda Pulikova	A Just Russia — For Truth	406	7.44%
16	Dmitry Oleshko	Rodina	238	4.36%
16	Svetlana Rybakova	Liberal Democratic Party	179	3.28%
16	Oksana Orlova	Communists of Russia	171	3.14%
16	Lyaysan Makhiyanova	New People	147	2.70%
16	Total		5,454	100%
16	Source:			
17	Mikhail Babchuk	United Russia	4,007	58.62%
17	Dmitry Karpov	Communists of Russia	713	10.43%
17	Artyom Vasilyev	Communist Party	591	8.65%
17	Vladimir Iovets	A Just Russia — For Truth	506	7.40%
17	Gennady Maltsev	Liberal Democratic Party	311	4.55%
17	Artyom Fisunenko	Russian Party of Freedom and Justice	230	3.36%
17	Aleksandr Konkov	Rodina	161	2.36%
17	Total		6,836	100%
17	Source:			
18	Vladimir Rozumeyko (incumbent)	United Russia	2,442	52.11%
18	Artyom Anisimov	Communist Party	883	18.84%
18	Zinaida Kek	A Just Russia — For Truth	382	8.15%
18	Andrey Voronov	Liberal Democratic Party	337	7.19%
18	Tatyana Lazareva	Russian Party of Freedom and Justice	173	3.69%
18	Aleksandr Ivanov	Communists of Russia	152	3.24%
18	Yevgeny Kovalev	Rodina	65	1.39%
18	Total		4,686	100%
18	Source:			

Former Sakhalin Oblast Duma Speaker Andrey Khapochkin (United Russia) was appointed to the Federation Council, replacing incumbent Yury Arkharov (Independent).

== See also ==
- 2022 Russian regional elections
