= 2024 Sakhalin Oblast gubernatorial election =

2024 Russian gubernatorial election

- 6–8 September 2024
- Turnout: 41.94%
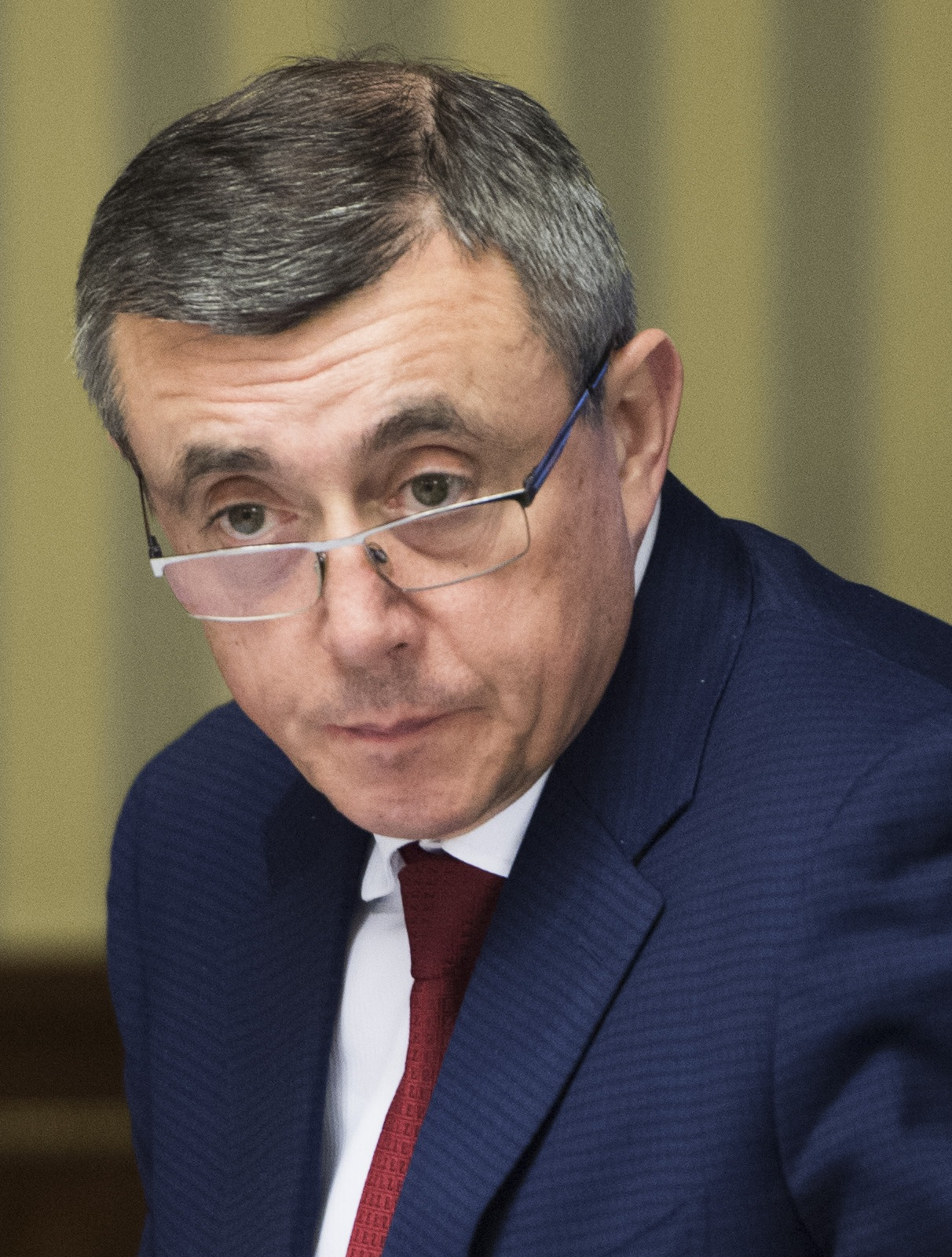
		CPRF	NL
Candidate	Valery Limarenko	Pavel Ashikhmin	Roman Vedeneyev
Party	United Russia	CPRF	New People
Popular vote	127,336	11,912	11,677
Percentage	80.79%	7.56%	7.41%
Governor before election
Valery Limarenko
Independent
Governor-elect
Valery Limarenko
United Russia

The 2024 Sakhalin Oblast gubernatorial election took place on 6–8 September 2024, on common election day. Incumbent Governor Valery Limarenko was reelected to a second term in office.

== Background ==
In September 2018 Governor of Sakhalin Oblast Oleg Kozhemyako was appointed acting Governor of Primorsky Krai after a political crisis that followed the 2018 gubernatorial election and the resignation of previous acting Governor Andrey Tarasenko. Vera Shcherbina, Chairwoman of the Sakhalin Oblast Government, served as acting Governor until December 2018 when Atomstroyexport president Valery Limarenko was appointed instead by President Vladimir Putin.

Limarenko, despite being a member of United Russia party, ran for a full term as an independent and faced a spirited challenge from Communist State Duma member from Primorsky Krai Aleksey Korniyenko. Former State Duma member and 2015 gubernatorial runner-up Svetlana Ivanova failed to secure support from CPRF and ran as an Independent but was unable to pass the municipal filter. Limarenko won September 2019 gubernatorial election with 56.14% of the vote with Korniyenko placing second with 24.21%. It was the closest gubernatorial election that cycle.

In April 2024 during a meeting with President Vladimir Putin Governor Limarenko announced his intention to run for a second term and received Putin's endorsement.

== Candidates ==
In Sakhalin Oblast candidates for Governor can be nominated by registered political parties or by self-nomination. Candidate for Governor of Sakhalin Oblast should be a Russian citizen and at least 30 years old. Candidates for Governor should not have a foreign citizenship or residence permit. Each candidate in order to be registered is required to collect at least 10% of signatures of members and heads of municipalities. In addition, self-nominated candidates should collect 0.5% of signatures of Sakhalin Oblast residents. Also gubernatorial candidates present 3 candidacies to the Federation Council and election winner later appoints one of the presented candidates.

=== Declared ===
Candidate name, political party		Occupation	Status	Ref.
Pavel Ashikhmin; Communist Party		Member of Sakhalin Oblast Duma (2022–present)	Registered	
Valery Limarenko; United Russia	Valery Limarenko	Incumbent Governor of Sakhalin Oblast (2018–present)	Registered	
Vadim Politsinsky; SR–ZP		Member of Sakhalin Oblast Duma (2022–present)	Registered	
Roman Vedeneyev; New People		Member of Sakhalin Oblast Duma (2022–present)	Registered	
Sergey Makarov; Independent		Publishing technician	Did not file	
Ruslan Vakhitov; Independent		Community activist	Did not file	
Yegor Zuyev; Independent		Businessman	Did not file	

=== Candidates for Federation Council ===
Gubernatorial candidate, political party	Candidates for Federation Council	Status
Pavel Ashikhmin; Communist Party	* Yevgeny Anisimov, veteran of the Russian invasion of Ukraine * Mikhail Cherevik, Member of Sakhalin Oblast Duma (2022–present) * Sergey Ponomaryov, former Member of Sakhalin Oblast Duma (1996–2008)	Registered
Valery Limarenko; United Russia	* Yury Filipenko, Director of the Victory Museum and Memorial Complex (2016–present) * Vladimir Ikonnikov, Chairman of the Civic Chamber of Sakhalin Oblast (2014–present), Member of the Presidential Council for Civil Society and Human Rights (2022–present) * Grigory Karasin, incumbent Senator (2019–present), Chairman of the Council Committee on Foreign Affairs (2021–present)	Registered
Vadim Politsinsky; SR–ZP	* Yevgeny Filileyev, energy specialist * Anna Mamot, Sakhalin State University employee * Feliks Mamot, military prosecutor	Registered
Roman Vedeneyev; New People	* Aleksandr Borovikov, Member of Duma of Yuzhno-Sakhalinsk (2022–present) * Ivan Butakov, Member of Duma of Yuzhno-Sakhalinsk (2019–present) * Vladislav Glukhov, Member of Duma of Yuzhno-Sakhalinsk (2019–present)	Registered

== Results ==
Summary of the 6–8 September 2024 Sakhalin Oblast gubernatorial election results
Candidate	Party	Votes	%
Valery Limarenko (incumbent)	United Russia	127,336	80.79
Pavel Ashikhmin	Communist Party	11,912	7.56
Roman Vedeneyev	New People	11,677	7.41
Vadim Politsinsky	A Just Russia – For Truth	3,538	2.24
Valid votes		154,463	98.00
Blank ballots		3,153	2.00
Total		157,616	100.00
Turnout		157,616	41.94
Registered voters		375,835	100.00

Governor Limarenko re-appointed incumbent Senator Grigory Karasin (Independent) to the Federation Council.

== See also ==
- 2024 Russian regional elections
