= Governor of Sakhalin Oblast =

Highest-ranking official in Sakhalin Oblast, Russia

- Coat of Arms of Sakhalin Oblast

- Flag of Sakhalin Oblast

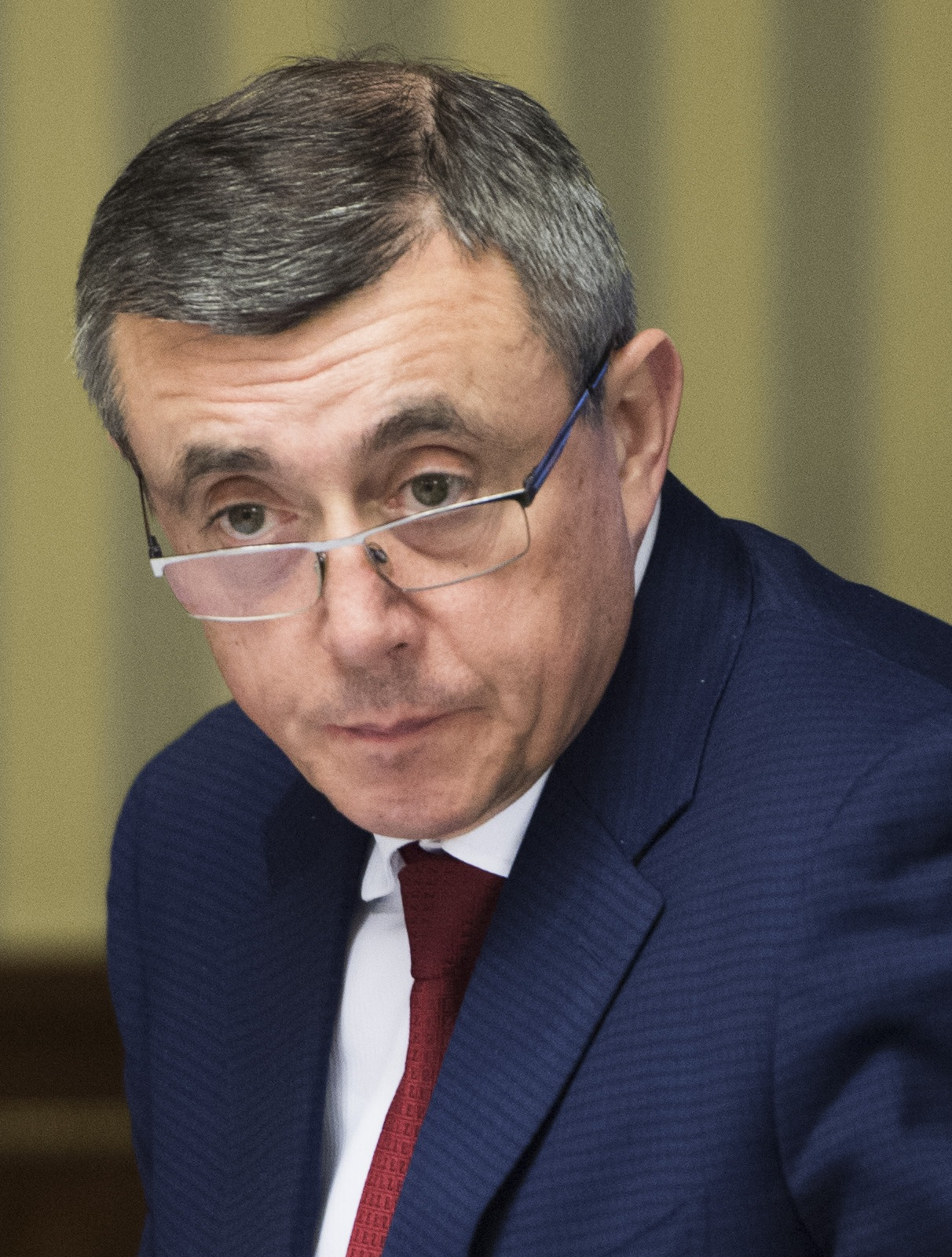
- Incumbent; Valery Limarenko since September 12, 2019
- Government of Sakhalin Oblast
- Style: His Excellency, Mr. Governor
- Residence: Kommunistichesky Avenue 32, Yuzhno-Sakhalinsk
- Seat: Yuzhno-Sakhalinsk
- Term length: 5 years
- Formation: 1991
- First holder: Valentin Fyodorov
- Website: sakhalin.gov.ru

The Governor of Sakhalin Oblast (Russian: Губернатор Сахалинской области) is the head of the executive branch of the Government of Sakhalin Oblast and the highest official of the oblast. The governor has a duty to enforce state laws in the region and to approve bills passed by the Sakhalin Oblast Duma or to disapprove it.

Since the formation of the position in 1991 there have been eight governors, including two interim governors. Igor Farkhutdinov was the only governor to die in office. The current governor, Valery Limarenko, has been interim governor since December 7, 2018.

The longest serving governors were Igor Farkhtdinov and Aleksandr Khoroshavin, who both served for 8 years in the office.

== Powers ==
- Forms the government, appoint the main officials of the provincial government. Performs the power of the highest official of the oblast.
- Take decision on the strategic development of the oblast and make socio-economic policy of the oblast.
- Ensures the observance of rights and freedoms of the citizen living in the oblast. Implementation of Federal and oblast laws and the Russian legislation in the oblast.
- Solves the issue of civil service. He/she appoints or dismissed the main holders of post of the oblast government.
- Appoints the head of the districts of oblast.
- Holds meetings of the oblast government on serious issues.
- Issue decrees and orders to implement law in the oblast.

== List of governors ==
No.	Image	Governor	Tenure	Time in office	Party	Election
1		Valentin Fyodorov (1939–2021)	8 October 1991 – 8 April 1993 (resigned)	1 year, 182 days	Independent	Appointed
2		Yevgeny Krasnoyarov (born 1939)	8 April 1993 – 24 April 1995 (resigned)	2 years, 16 days	Independent	Appointed
3		Igor Farkhutdinov (1950–2003)	24 April 1995 – 20 August 2003 (died in office)	8 years, 118 days	Independent	Appointed 1996; 2000
–		Ivan Malakhov (born 1953)	20 August 2003 – 30 December 2003	3 years, 352 days	Independent → United Russia	Acting
4		Ivan Malakhov (born 1953)	30 December 2003 – 7 August 2007 (resigned)	3 years, 352 days	Independent → United Russia	2003
–		Aleksandr Khoroshavin (born 1959)	7 August 2007 – 11 August 2007	7 years, 230 days	United Russia	Acting
5		Aleksandr Khoroshavin (born 1959)	11 August 2007 – 25 March 2015 (removed)	7 years, 230 days	United Russia	2007 (Note: Appointed by the president of Russia wth the consent of the Sakhalin Oblast Duma.); 2011
–		Oleg Kozhemyako (born 1962)	25 March 2015 – 13 September 2015	3 years, 185 days	United Russia	Acting
6		Oleg Kozhemyako (born 1962)	13 September 2015 – 26 September 2018 (resigned)	3 years, 185 days	United Russia	2015
–		Vera Shcherbina (born 1958)	27 September 2018 – 7 December 2018	71 days	United Russia	Acting
–		Valery Limarenko (born 1960)	7 December 2018 – 12 September 2019	7 years, 327 days	United Russia	Acting
7		Valery Limarenko (born 1960)	12 September 2019 – present	7 years, 327 days	United Russia	2019; 2024
