= Aleksandr Khoroshavin =

Russian politician

Alexander Khoroshavin
- Александр Хорошавин
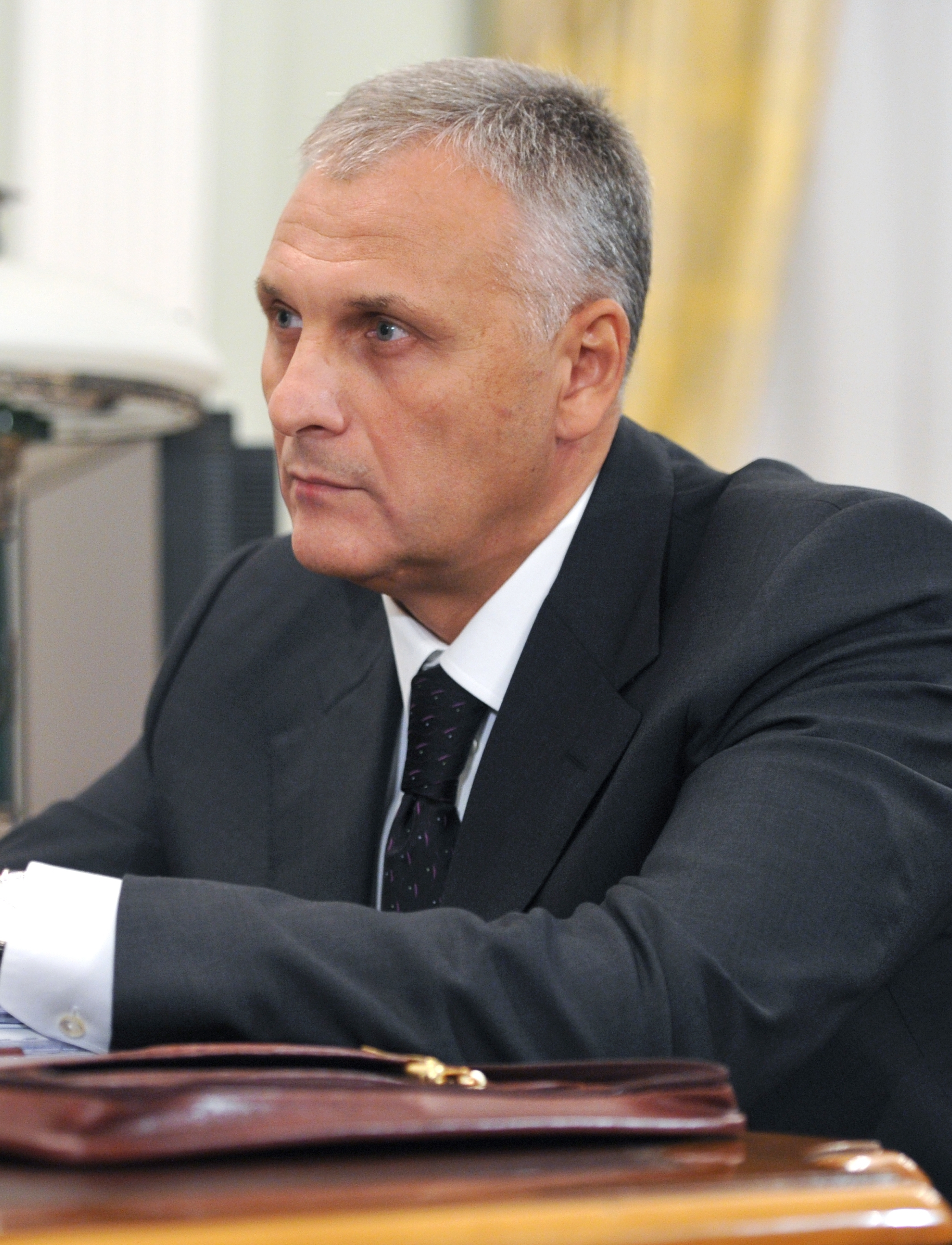
- Khoroshavin in 2011

Governor of Sakhalin Oblast
- In office August 7, 2007 – March 25, 2015
- President: Dmitry Medvedev; Vladimir Putin
- Preceded by: Ivan Malakhov
- Succeeded by: Oleg Kozhemyako

Personal details
- Born: November 26, 1959 (age 66) Svobodny, Amur AO, Russian SFSR, Soviet Union
- Party: United Russia
- Education: Far Eastern State Technical University
- Profession: Teacher

Alexander Vadimovich Khoroshavin (Russian: Александр Вадимович Хорошавин: born May 2, 1959) is a Russian politician who served as Governor of Sakhalin Oblast from 2007 to 2015.

== Biography ==
Khoroshavin was appointed to the position after Ivan Malakhov left office in 2007. On March 4, 2015, he was arrested after being accused of taking bribes, equivalent of US$5.6 million President Vladimir Putin removed him from office on March 25, 2015, as a result of the arrest.

=== Arrest ===
On March 4, 2015, Khoroshavin was detained at his workplace and, accompanied by employees of the RF IC, was taken to Moscow. During the search at the place of residence, 1 billion rubles in cash were seized. Searches were also held in a Moscow apartment and at the Khoroshavin's dacha where, in addition to money, 800 jewelry were seized, for example, a pen worth 36 million rubles. Subsequently, the presence of such an expensive pen was disproved.

On March 4, the Moscow Basmanny Court arrested Khoroshavin and his adviser Andrei Ikramov, in the case of receiving a bribe (the so-called “kickback”) of $5.6 million from the head of Energostroy, the head of the Pacific Vneshtorgbank Nikolai Kran, conclusion of a state contract for the construction of one of the blocks of the Yuzhno-Sakhalinskaya CHPP.

On the same day, on a flight to Tokyo, Andrei Lobkin, director of Yuzhno-Sakhalinsk Airport Terminal (formerly the mayor of Yuzhno-Sakhalinsk) left the Sakhalin Region. Later, criminal proceedings were instituted against the latter on the grounds of a crime under Part 4 of Art. 291.1 of the Criminal Code (mediation in bribery). OJSC Yuzhno-Sakhalinsk Airport was established with the support of Khoroshavin.

Khoroshavin supported Lobkin's initiative to reconstruct the Yuzhno-Sakhalinsk airport worth 7 billion rubles, including the construction of a new airport complex and a new runway capable of receiving the longest-haul aircraft.

March 25, 2015, Khoroshavin, while in jail, was removed from office by decree of the President of the Russian Federation with the wording “in connection with the loss of confidence of the President of the Russian Federation”.

The prosecutor's office demanded that Alexander Khoroshavin be punished by imprisonment of 13 years and a fine of 500 million rubles. Khoroshavin stated that he was not guilty and in his last word addressed the residents of the Sakhalin Region: “There were no bribes and legalization. I confirm this in the last word. I have not committed the crimes that charge me. If this affects the aggravation of punishment, so be it”.

On February 9, 2018, the Yuzhno-Sakhalinsk City Court sentenced Khoroshavin to 13 years in prison in a maximum security penal colony with a fine of 500 million rubles, a ban on holding public office for five years, and deprivation of state awards - the Order of Honor and Medal Order of Merit to the Fatherland, II degree.

On April 28, 2022, Khoroshavin was sentenced to 15 years in prison for accepting more than 100 million rubles in bribes from candidates during a 2014 local election campaign.
