= Andrey Khapochkin =

Russian politician (born 1968)

- Андрей Хапочкин
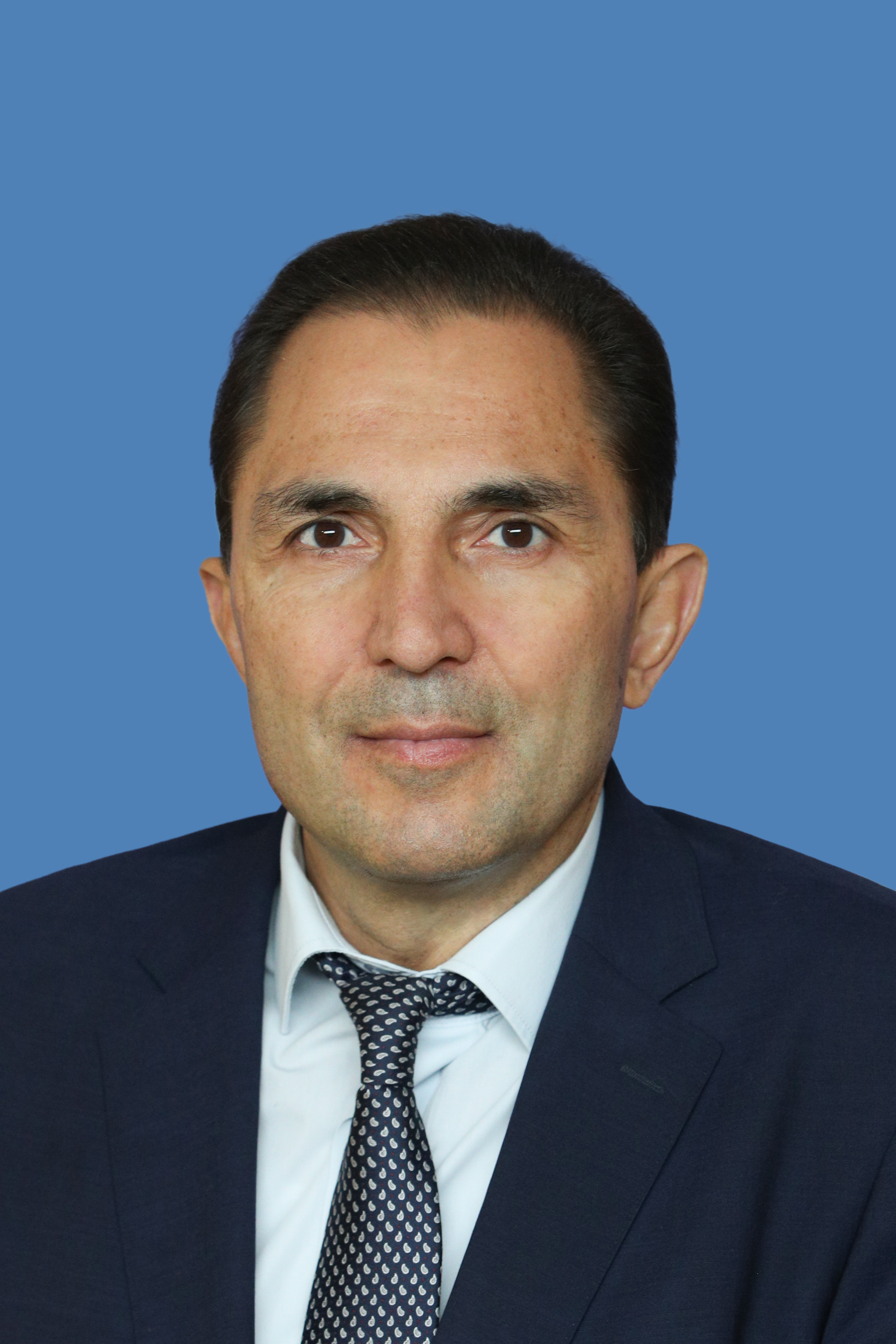

Senator from Sakhalin Oblast
- Incumbent
- Assumed office 6 October 2022
- Preceded by: Yuri Arkharov

Personal details
- Born: Andrey Khapochkin; 7 October 1967 (age 58) Irkutsk Oblast, Russian Soviet Socialist Republic, Soviet Union
- Party: United Russia
- Education: Kharkiv National University of Radioelectronics

Andrey Alexeyevich Khapochkin (Russian: Андрей Алексеевич Хапочкин; born 7 October 1968) is a Russian politician serving as a senator from Sakhalin Oblast since 6 October 2022.

== Biography ==
Andrey Khapochkin was born on 29 August 1958 in Irkutsk Oblast. In 1992, he graduated from the Kharkiv National University of Radioelectronics. From 1986 to 1987, he served in the Soviet Army. In 1996, he became the author of the weekly regional program "Sports News". Later Khapochkin worked as an editor, correspondent, and TV host. From 2002 to 2006, he headed the youth policy department of the administration of the Sakhalin region. From 2006 to 2022, he was the deputy of the Sakhalin Oblast Duma of the 5th, 6th, and 7th convocations. On 6 October 2022, he became the senator from the Sakhalin Oblast Duma.

Since Khapochkin was appointed senator only in October 2022, he has not yet been included, as other senators, in the list of personal sanctions introduced by the European Union, the United Kingdom, the USA, Canada, Switzerland, Australia, Ukraine, New Zealand, for ratifying the decisions of the "Treaty of Friendship, Cooperation and Mutual Assistance between the Russian Federation and the Donetsk People's Republic and between the Russian Federation and the Luhansk People's Republic" and providing political and economic support for Russia's annexation of Ukrainian territories.
