= Igor Farkhutdinov =

Russian politician (1950–2003)

- Игорь Фархутдинов
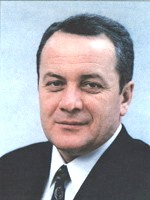

3rd Governor of Sakhalin Oblast
- In office 24 April 1995 – 20 August 2003
- Preceded by: Yevgeny Krasnoyarov
- Succeeded by: Ivan Malakhov

Mayor of Yuzhno-Sakhalinsk
- In office 31 December 1991 – 24 April 1995
- Succeeded by: Vladimir Yagubov

Personal details
- Born: 16 April 1950 Novosibirsk, RSFSR, Soviet Union
- Died: 20 August 2003 (aged 53) Opala, Ust-Bolsheretsky District, Kamchatka Oblast, Russia
- Party: Our Home – Russia
- Education: Krasnoyarsk Polytechnic Institute

Igor Pavlovich Farkhutdinov (Russian: Игорь Павлович Фархутдинов; April 16, 1950 – August 20, 2003) was governor of Sakhalin Oblast, Russia during 1995–2003.

== Biography ==
Igor Farkhutdinov was born in 1950 in Novosibirsk to a Russian mother and Tatar father. His maternal grandfather participated in the Russo-Japanese War on Sakhalin island. In 1972 Igor graduated from the Krasnoyarsk Polytechnic Institute (now part of the Siberian Federal University) as engineer-economist. He played for the rugby team "Polytechnic" (now Krasny Yar). For the next five years he worked at Tymovskoye power plant, Sakhalin Oblast.

From 1977 to 1985 Farkhutdinov was working in Tymovsky District committee, then Sakhalin Oblast committee of Komsomol, instructor of the Communist Party regional committee. From 1985 to 1991 he was the head of Nevelsk. Until August 1991, he was member of the Communist Party.

From 31 December 1991 to 24 April 1995 — Chairman of the Yuzhno-Sakhalinsk City Executive Committee, then Mayor of Yuzhno-Sakhalinsk. On 24 April 1995, he was appointed Head of Administration of Sakhalin Oblast. A month later, the island suffered from a disastrous earthquake, that devastated the town of Neftegorsk. Farkhutdinov won the 1996 gubernatorial election and successfully re-elected in 2000. During his governorship two oil and gas projects were launched on the island, Sakhalin-1 and Sakhalin-2.

== Death ==
On 20 August 2003, a Mi-8 helicopter disappeared in Kamchatka Oblast, on board of which was a group of officials from Sakhalin, including governor Farkhutdinov. The helicopter took off at 05:40 AM Moscow time from the Izluchina helipad (Elizovo Airport) in the direction of Severo-Kurilsk, Paramushir island. An hour later the helicopter was lost. It crashed 150 km south of Petropavlovsk-Kamchatsky, near Opala volcano, losing control as a result of the collision of the rotor blades with the tail boom. On August 23, the burnt wreckage of a helicopter was discovered. All 17 passengers and three crew members died. They were buried in the courtyard of the Resurrection Cathedral in Yuzhno-Sakhalinsk.

On 10 February 2017, Prime Minister of Russia Dmitry Medvedev signed an order to assign the name of Igor Farkhutdinov to a previously unnamed island of the Kuril archipelago.
