= Ivan Malakhov =

Russian politician (born 1953)

- Иван Малахов
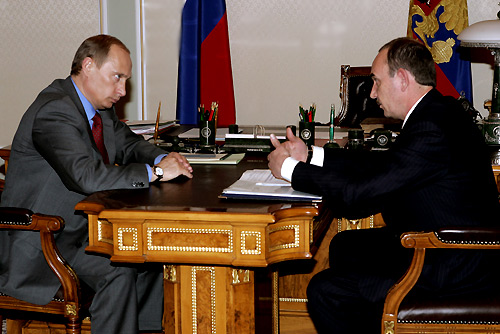
- Malakhov in 2005

Governor of Sakhalin Oblast
- In office August 20, 2003 – August 7, 2007
- President: Vladimir Putin
- Preceded by: Igor Farkhutdinov
- Succeeded by: Alexander Khoroshavin

Personal details
- Born: June 29, 1953 (age 72) Pologoye Zaimische, Astrakhan Oblast, Russian SFSR, Soviet Union
- Party: United Russia
- Profession: Sailor

Ivan Pavlovich Malakhov (born June 29, 1953) is a Russian politician and the former governor of Sakhalin Oblast. He was born in Pologoye Zaimische, Astrakhan Oblast, Russian SFSR, and is a naval veteran, attaining the rank of captain. From 1981 – 1982 he was at Higher Officers' Courses in Leningrad. In 1991, he became mayor of Nevelsk, and in 1996 after graduating from the Russian Academy of State Service, he became vice-governor of Sakhalin. He became acting governor at the death of Governor Frakhudinov on August 20, 2003. He was elected governor in a run-off on December 21, 2003, and was sworn in on December 30. Malakhov has been instrumental in opening up the Sakhalin region to economic development and mineral exploration.

Malakhov quit over criticism over his handling of a relief operation following an earthquake in Nevelsk, southern Sakhalin, in early August 2007.
