= Vera Shcherbina =

Russian politician

- Вера Щербина
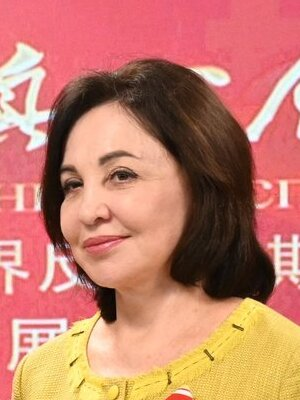
- Shcherbina in 2025

Prime Minister of Primorsky Krai
- Incumbent
- Assumed office 1 January 2020
- Governor: Oleg Kozhemyako

Governor of Sakhalin Oblast (acting)
- In office 27 September 2018 – 7 December 2018
- Preceded by: Oleg Kozhemyako
- Succeeded by: Valery Limarenko

Personal details
- Born: Vera Georgiyevna Scherbina; 20 November 1958 (age 67) Chernyshevsk, Chita Oblast, Russian SFSR, Soviet Union
- Party: United Russia

Vera Georgiyevna Shcherbina (Russian: Вера Георгиевна Щербина; born 20 November 1958) is a Russian politician. She served as the acting governor of Sakhalin Oblast from 27 September to 7 December 2018. She also served as the head of the Government of Sakhalin Oblast from 2016 to 2018.

She has PhD in Economics, and is an honored economist of Russia.

== Biography ==
Vera Shcherbina was born in Chernyshevsk on 11 November 2018.

In 1976 she graduated from secondary school number 1 in the city of Zavitinsk in Amur Oblast.

Since 1978, she worked in the Luchegorsk village council of the Primorsky Krai as a construction technician.

In 1984, she received a diploma from the Faculty of Engineering and Economics of the Khabarovsk Polytechnic Institute.

Since 1992, after receiving a proper education, she began to work in the state authorities of Primorye.

In 1997, she took the position of deputy head of the administration of the Pozharsky district of the Primorsky Krai for financial issues.

In 1999, she became a candidate of economic sciences, having completed her postgraduate studies at the Khabarovsk Academy of Economics and Law with a degree in Finance and Money Circulation.

In 2001, she became the head of the department of inter-budgetary relations, then the deputy director of the finance department of the Primorsky Krai Administration.

In 2005, she was appointed Vice Governor, and the head of the Finance Department of the Administration of the Koryak Autonomous Okrug in the Kamchatka Krai.

In 2008 Shcherbina was accepted as a federal inspector in the office of the presidential envoy in the Far Eastern Federal District in Moscow.

In December 2008, she became Deputy Chairman of the Government of the Amur Oblast as the Minister of Finance. In October 2012, she was appointed First Deputy Chairman of the Government of the Amur Oblast.

In September 2015, she took the position of First Deputy Chairman of the Government of the Sakhalin Oblast.

In January 2016, she was appointed Chairman of the Government of the Sakhalin Oblast.

After Oleg Kozhemyako was appointed as the acting Governor of the Primorsky Krai, Shcherbina was the acting governor of Sakahlin Oblast from 27 September 2018 until 7 December 2018].

On 17 December 2018, she left the post of Chairman of the Government of the Sakhalin Region of her own free will.
