= Sakhalin Oblast Duma =

Regional parliament of Sakhalin Oblast, Russia

Sakhalin Oblast Duma Сахалинская областная Дума
- 8th legislature

Type
- Type: Unicameral

Leadership
- Chairwoman: Yelena Kasyanova, United Russia since 26 September 2022

Structure
- Seats: 28
- Political groups: United Russia (21); CPRF (2); New People (2); RPPSJ (1); SRZP (1); LDPR (1)
- Length of term: 5 years

Elections
- Voting system: Parallel voting
- Last election: 11 September 2022
- Next election: 2027

Meeting place
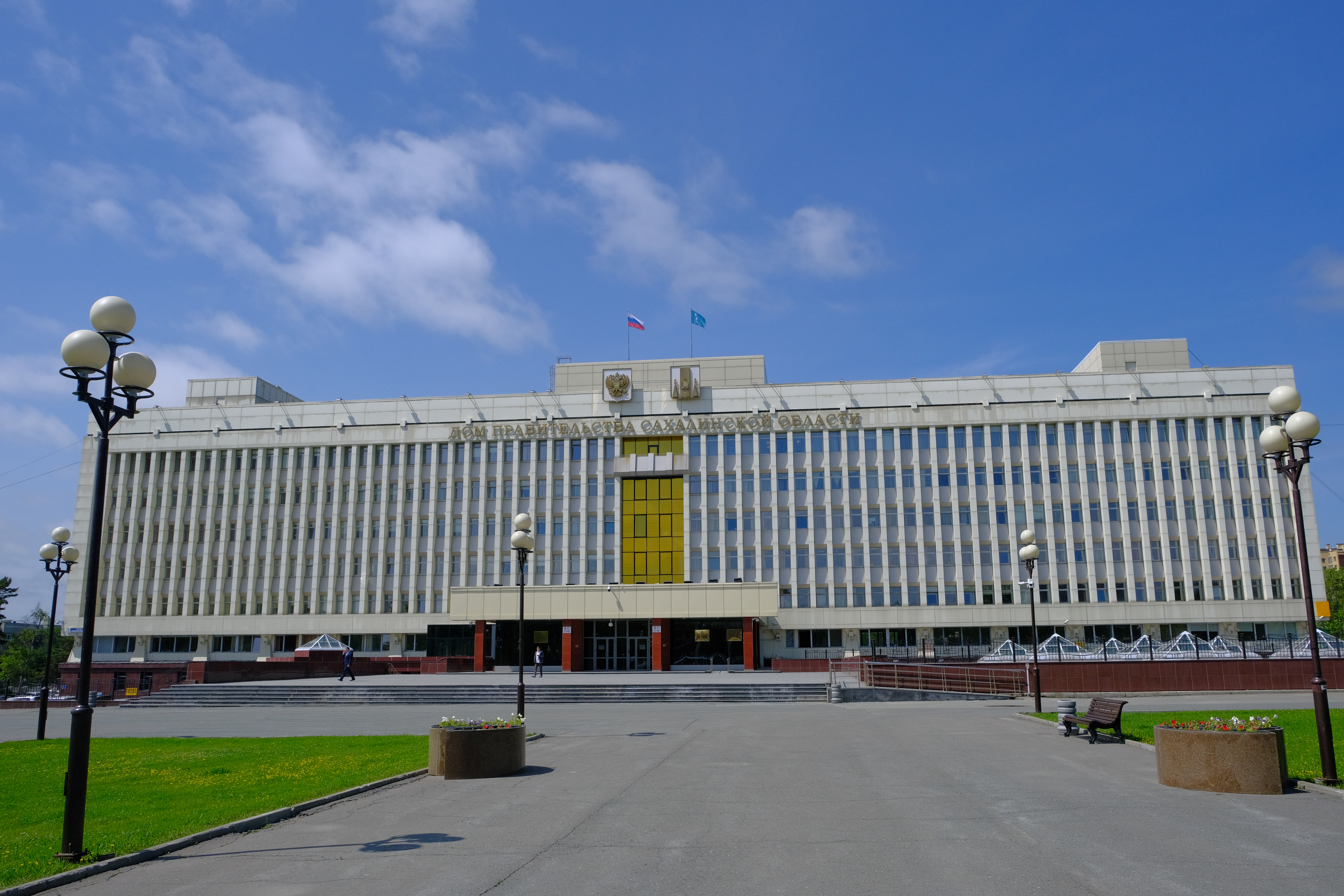
- 37 Chekhova Street, Yuzhno-Sakhalinsk

Website
- www.dumasakhalin.ru

The Sakhalin Oblast Duma (Russian: Сахалинская областная дума, romanized: Sakhalinskaya oblastnaya duma) is the regional parliament of Sakhalin Oblast, a federal subject of Russia. Together with the executive and judicial branches, the oblast's legislative assembly is vested with power to control the oblast's own affairs with moderate levels of autonomy from Moscow. A total of 28 deputies are elected for five-year terms. 18 deputies are elected by single-member constituencies and 10 deputies are elected in party lists.

== History ==
Prior to the dissolution of the Soviet Union, the Supreme Soviet of RSFSR was the legislative body of the Soviet Union that was elected by members of the Congress of People's Deputies of Russia. The Supreme Soviet of Russia itself contained the Council of the Republic and the Council of Nationalities, which represented the population size of the federal subjects and the federal subjects themselves respectively. During the Russian constitutional crisis of 1993, the activities of the regional council of people's deputies were terminated. Power was decentralized to the individual federal subjects in accordance with the presidential decree of October 9, 1993 (No. 1617) "On the Reform of Representative Authorities and Local Self-Government in the Russian Federation" and the decision of the Sakhalin Oblast Governor of October 16, 1993 (No. 251) "On the reform of the Sakhalin Regional People's Deputies".

In its aftermath, in accordance with another presidential decree of October 22, 1993 (No. 1723) “On the Basic Principles of the Organization of State Power in the Subjects of the Russian Federation”, the Provisional Regulation on the Regional Duma, which would be the legislative body of Sakhalin Oblast, was approved by the Sakhalin Oblast Governor via decision No. 65 on February 2, 1994. The regulation establishes that the oblast Duma will consist of 16 deputies elected by the population of the region and would have a term of two years.

== Structure ==
As with most of the regional parliaments of Russia, the Oblast Duma is unicameral. As of 2022, it currently comprises 28 deputies, with 18 of them running in single-mandate constituencies and the other 10 in a single at-large electoral district. 18 members are elected in single-member districts by first-past-the-post voting while another 10 are selected by party-list proportional representation in a single island-wide electoral district. The Oblast Duma, as with all regional legislatures in Russia, elects the Oblast's representation in the Federation Council, the upper house of the bicameral Federal Assembly, the national parliament

A two-thirds majority vote is needed for a charter or its amendments to be adopted by the Duma. While a simple majority vote is needed for resolutions or laws to be passed in the Duma.

The executive branch of Sakhalin works closely with the oblast's Duma. The executive branch is also known as the government Sakhalin. It is headed by the governor, who is the highest ranking person in the oblast. The Governor is not to be confused with the Chairman of the Duma, who is head of the Duma only.

== Elections ==
=== 2017 ===
Party	%	Seats
United Russia	44.64	19
Communist Party of the Russian Federation	16.50	4
Liberal Democratic Party of Russia	13.02	2
Self-nominated	—	3
For Women of Russia	4.82	0
A Just Russia	4.54	0
Communists of Russia	4.12	0
Registered voters/turnout	26.02	

=== 2022 ===
Party	%	Seats
United Russia	47.20	21
Communist Party of the Russian Federation	14.25	2
Liberal Democratic Party of Russia	9.19	1
New People	8.89	2
Russian Party of Pensioners for Social Justice	6.70	1
A Just Russia — For Truth	5.14	1
Registered voters/turnout	29.67	

== List of chairpeople ==
Chairman	Year
Valiulla Safiullovich Maksutov	1994 – 1996
Boris Nikitovich Tretyak	1996 – 2001
Lyubov Fedorovna Shubina (acting)	2001 – 2002
Vladimir Ilyich Efremov	2002 – 2017
Andrey Alekseevich Khapochkin	2017 – 2022
Yelena Nikolayevna Kasyanova	2022 – present

== Previous legislative assemblies ==
Convocation	Results and development
I	Elections for the first convocation were held on 27 March 1994. However, due to the fact that the elections in Yuzhno-Sakhalinsk, which were held in March 1994, as well as repeated elections in July 1994, were declared invalid, the Duma of the first convocation started off with only 12 deputies. These 12 deputies were elected for a 2-year term. In the 24 meetings that the convocation had, a total of 369 resolutions were accepted, with 26 being regional laws.
II	Elections for the second convocation were held on 20 October 1996. 27 deputies were elected for a 4-year term. In the 77 meetings that the convocation had, a total of 1768 resolutions were accepted, with 208 being regional laws.
III	Elections for the third convocation were held on 22 October 2000. 27 deputies were elected for a 4-year term. In the 92 meetings that the convocation had, a total of 2154 resolutions were accepted, with 317 being regional laws.
IV	Elections for the fourth convocation were held on 10 October 2004. 28 deputies were elected for a 4-year term. In the 91 meetings that the convocation had, a total of 2729 resolutions were accepted, with 375 being regional laws.
V	Elections for the fifth convocation were held on 12 October 2008. 28 deputies were elected for a 4-year term. In the 82 meetings that the convocation had, a total of 2166 resolutions were accepted, with 534 being regional laws.
VI	Elections for the sixth convocation were held on 14 October 2012. 28 deputies were elected for a newly extended 5-year term. In the 123 meetings that the convocation had, a total of 2017 resolutions were accepted, with 614 being regional laws.
VII	Elections for the seventh convocation were held on 10 September 2017. 28 deputies were elected for a 5-year term. During the seventh convocation, many issues especially those pertaining to the compulsory health insurance fund, pension and student development were tabled for discussion by the Duma.
