= For Women of Russia =

People's Party «For Women of Russia» Народная партия «За женщин России»
- Abbreviation: NPZZhR (English); НПЗЖР (Russian)
- Leader: Galina Khavraeva
- Founder: Galina Latysheva
- Founded: March 31, 2007
- Registered: May 17, 2012
- Dissolved: June 14, 2019
- Headquarters: 2/3rd building, Shubinsky Lane, Moscow, Russia
- Ideology: Women's rights Conservatism; Neoconservatism; Single-issue party
- Political position: Centre-right to right-wing
- Colours: Blue; Gold
- Slogan: "Conscience, Consent, Strength!" (Russian: "Совесть, Согласие, Сила!")

Website
- npzhr.ru

The People's Party «For Women of Russia» (NPZZhR; Russian: Народная партия «За женщин России»; НПЗЖР; Narodnaya partiya «Za zhenshchin Rossii», NPZZhR) was a registered political party in Russia. The history of the party dates back to the founding congress on March 31, 2007. The party approved the charter and program of the party on April 22, 2012.

== People's Party "For Women of Russia" ==
=== Election results ===
In the elections to the Closed administrative district of Fokino in 2013, the party received 3.1%. The party also participated in the elections to the city council of Kamensk-Uralsky.

According to the results of a single election day in 2013, the party won a seat in the State Assembly of the Sakha Republic in a single-mandate constituency 21. Gulsum Beisembayeva represented the party in the Yakut parliament in 2013–2018, she was not elected to the next composition.

The party competed with the Yabloko party in the Volgograd region in the elections to the regional parliament on September 14, 2014.

== Party liquidation ==
In May 2019, it became known that the Russian Ministry of Justice had filed a lawsuit to liquidate the party in connection with failure to comply with the requirements for mandatory participation in elections (within seven years from the date of registration, the party must participate in a number of elected companies).

On June 14, 2019, the People's Party "For Women of Russia" was liquidated by a decision of the Supreme Court of the Russian Federation for insufficient participation in elections for seven years.

Party participation in elections in 2012-2019
Election type	Required participation	Actual participation	List of regions
Russian presidential elections	1	0	n/a
State Duma elections	1	0	n/a
Elections for the Heads of constituent entities	9 (10% from subjects)	2	Primorsky Krai, Amur Oblast
Elections to legislative assemblies of constituent entities	17 (20% from subjects)	8	Republic of Sakha, Republic of North Ossetia – Alania, Chechen Republic, Krasnodar Krai, Amur Oblast, Volgograd Oblast, Sakhalin Oblast, Sverdlovsk Oblast
Elections to local governments in the constituent entities	43 (more than half of the subjects)	14	Karachay-Cherkess Republic, Republic of Sakha, Republic of North Ossetia – Alania, Krasnodar Krai, Primorsky Krai, Amur Oblast, Astrakhan Oblast, Volgograd Oblast, Novosibirsk Oblast, Sakhalin Oblast, Sverdlovsk Oblast, Tver Oblast, Tula Oblast, City of Saint Petersburg

== Criticism ==
Gazeta.Ru expert Arkady Lyubarev notes the presence in the party of signs of a "single-issue party".
