= Valery Limarenko =

Russian politician (born 1960)

- Валерий Лимаренко
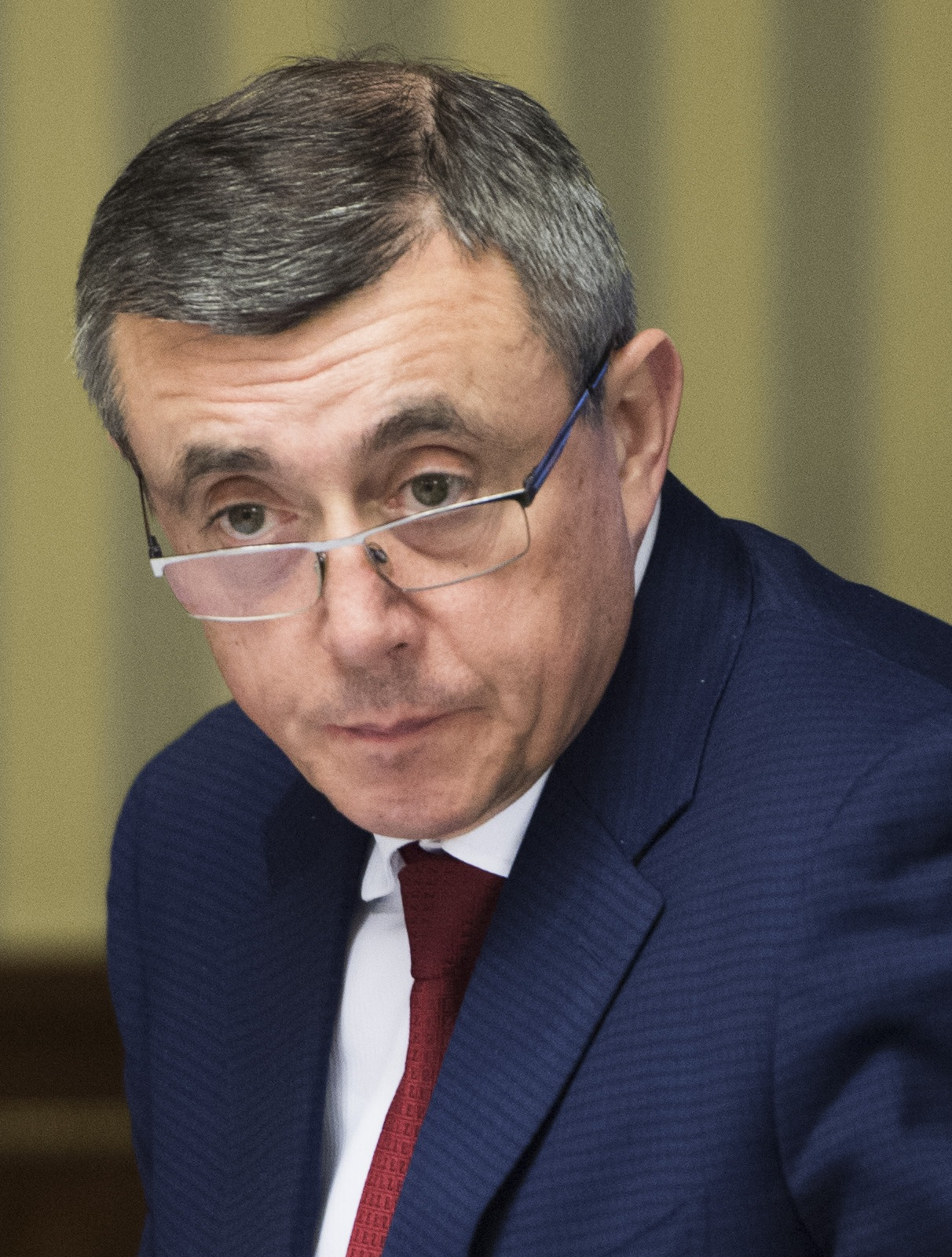
- Limarenko in 2019

Governor of Sakhalin Oblast
- Incumbent
- Assumed office 12 September 2019
- President: Vladimir Putin
- Preceded by: Vera Shcherbina (acting); Oleg Kozhemyako

Governor of Sakhalin Oblast (acting)
- In office 7 December 2018 – 12 September 2019

Personal details
- Born: 19 October 1960 (age 65) Kharkiv, Ukrainian SSR, Soviet Union
- Party: United Russia
- Education: Kharkov Aviation Institute

Valery Igorevich Limarenko (Russian: Валерий Игоревич Лимаренко; born 19 October 1960) is a Russian politician currently serving as Governor of Sakhalin Oblast, a federal subject of Russia, since 2018.

== Early life ==
Limarenko was born on 19 October 1960 in Kharkiv. His grandfather worked at an aircraft repair plant and his father was a military pilot. He was also going to become a pilot, but did not pass for medical reasons.

In 1983, he graduated from Kharkov Aviation Institute and was qualified as a mechanical engineer of aircraft engines. In 1983, Limarenko took up the post of a design engineer at the All-Union Scientific Research Institute of Experimental Physics (VNIIEF) in Arzamas-16. In 1988, he returned to scientific work. In 1999, he defended his thesis for the degree of candidate of economic sciences on the topic "Management of the Process of Mortgage Lending in the Municipality", at the Nizhny Novgorod State University of Architecture and Civil Engineering.

In 2000, he defended his thesis for Ph.D. on economics on the topic "Formation and Development of the Municipal System of Management of Housing Mortgage Lending in a Transitional Economy", at the Institute of Regional Economic Research in Moscow.

== Scientific career ==
Limarenko served as the president of the Moscow Engineering Physics Institute and head of the department of Life Cycle Management Systems for Complex Engineering Objects at the Nizhny Novgorod State Technical University (NSTU). He also received an honorary doctorate from NSTU.

He also served as the head of the department of New Financial Technologies at the Sarov State Physics Technical Institute. Limarenko served as the vice president of the International Association of Housing and Mortgage Funds (IAIF).

== Business career ==
In 2007, he joined Rosatom, a Russian state corporation that specializes in nuclear energy, nuclear non-energy goods and high-tech products. Limarenko headed numerous subsidiaries of Rosatom before heading the Engineering Division of Rosatom from July 2016.

During his time in Rosatom, Limarenko oversaw the providing of assistance to Japan during the Fukushima nuclear disaster in the aftermath of the 2011 Tōhoku earthquake and tsunami. He also was responsible for the development of the Unit No.3 of Tianwan Nuclear Power Plant in Lianyungang, China.

== Political career ==
From 1984 to 1988, he worked as a Komsomol worker at VNIIEF. He later served as deputy and then secretary of the Komsomol committee of VNIIEF. He served as the Deputy in the Sarov Town Duma and later Deputy Chairman for Economics and Finance.

Limarenko was appointed as the Minister of Construction, Housing and Utilities of Nizhny Novgorod in 2001. In 2003, he served as Chief Federal Inspector for the Nizhny Novgorod Region in the office of the Plenipotentiary Representative of the President of the Russian Federation in the Volga Federal District. From 2005 to 2007, he served as the deputy governor and deputy chairman of the Government of Nizhny Novgorod for construction, energy, housing, communal services and information technologies.

=== Governor of Sakhalin Oblast ===
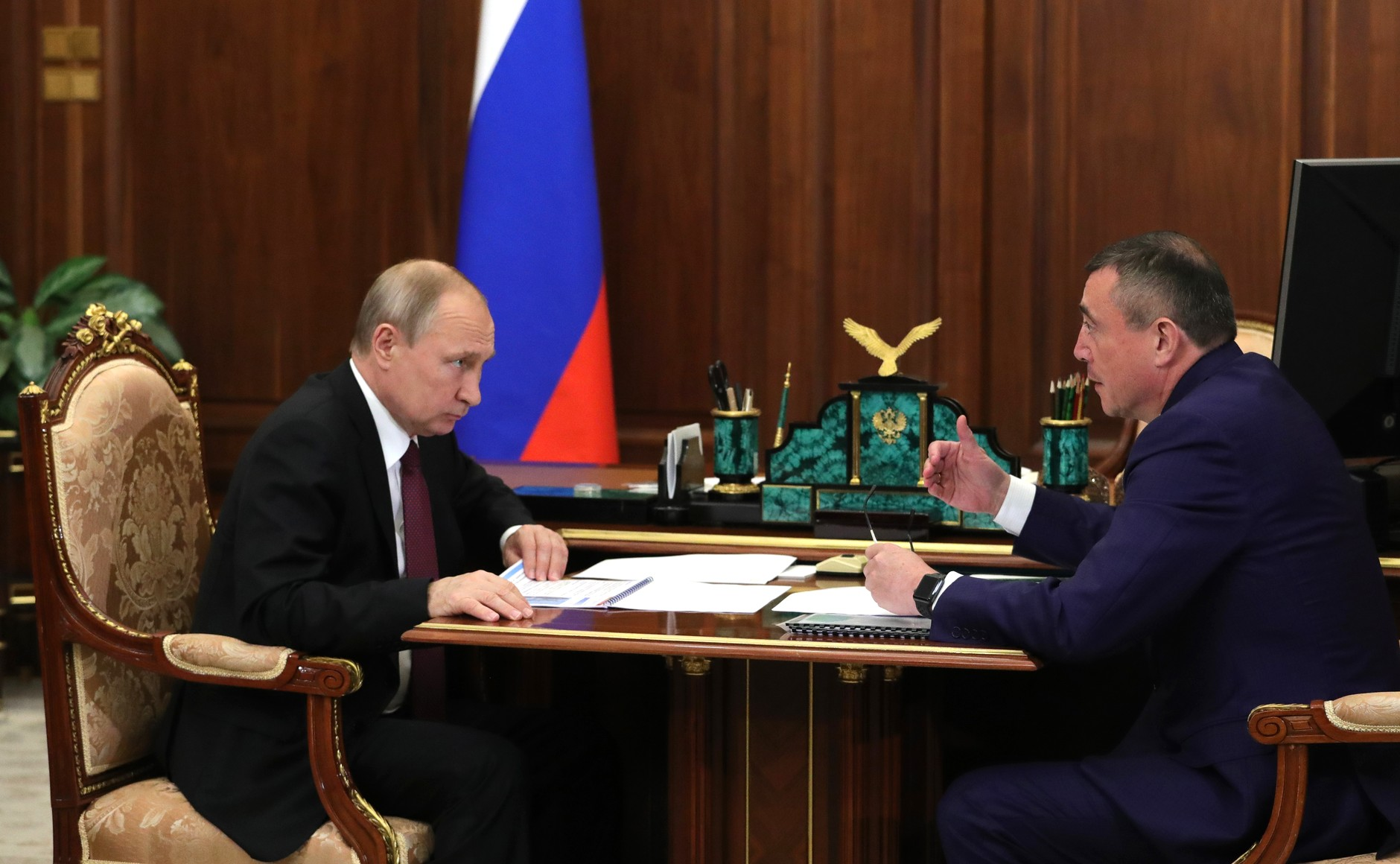
Limarenko and Vladimir Putin in the Kremlin, 30 July 2019

On 7 December 2018, by the Decree of the President of Russia Vladimir Putin, Limarenko was appointed Acting Governor of the Sakhalin Oblast due to the transfer of previous governor Oleg Kozhemyako to the position of Acting Governor of Primorsky Krai.

On 10 December 2018 Limarenko announced his intention to stand as a candidate in the gubernatorial elections as a self-nominated candidate. Limarenko regularly held meetings with residents of the region, where the most pressing problems are discussed. On 2019 Russian regional elections, Limarenko won the first round of elections for the Governor of the Sakhalin Region gaining 56.15% of the votes cast in the elections. His term of office will end in 2024. On 12 September 2019 he officially took office as the Head of the Sakhalin Region.

From 27 January 2020 he became a member of the Presidium of the State Council of the Russian Federation.

On 14 January 2021, in his Telegram account, Limarenko announced his intention to issue special badges to citizens vaccinated against COVID-19 in the region, allowing them not to wear masks. On 19 January it became known that instead of a badge for those vaccinated against COVID-19, an electronic certificate will be introduced in the form of a QR code in the phone.

On 8 September 2021, under his governorship, Sakhalin Oblast signed a memorandum with Japan's Mitsubishi Corporation to cooperate on decarbonisation through setting up large-scale production of hydrogen for exports, and also through carbon capture and storage technologies.

==== Three-year results ====
Under Limarenko, Sakhalin Region became the first region in Russia to complete the resettlement program of emergency housing for buildings, recognized as such before 2017. With the support of the federal center, the authorities continued to resettle dilapidated houses that had been listed to the program in subsequent years. According to media reports, Limarenko's lobbying played an essential role in resolving this issue.

Media reports also stated that Limarenko's lobbying has helped speed up the region's gasification with Gazprom. As of 2022, the level of gasification in Sakhalin and the Kuril Islands reached 54%. In addition, all the region's residents are reimbursed up to 152 000 rubles for preparing their households for gas supply. The preparation includes design and survey works, construction of external gas pipelines, installation of gas pipelines and internal gas supply system into the house. In Yuzhno-Sakhalinsk and Aniva districts, preferential categories of citizens are also compensated up to 50 000 rubles for purchasing in-house gas equipment (e.g., stoves, water heaters, heating boilers, gas consumption meters, safety and alarm systems).

In addition, Limarenko resolved the transportation issue in the region. During his three years of governorship, the network of local aviation routes was significantly expanded. To do so, a unified Far Eastern airline was created on the base of a local Aurora airline company. Moreover, dozens of runways and air terminals were rebuilt during this period in various districts. In August 2022, regional authorities began the construction of a new runway and passenger terminal at Yuzhno-Sakhalinsk International Airport. As a result, passenger traffic in aviation increased by more than 30%.

The shortage of passenger ships in the Kuril direction (Kunashir, Iturup, and Shikotan) was also solved. In 2021, two newly-built cargo-passenger ships – the Admiral Nevelskoy and the Pavel Leonov – departed for the Korsakov-Kurily line. They were built near Saint Petersburg specifically for serving in island regions.

Since 2019, 474.2 km of regional, inter-municipal, and local roads have been upgraded on the islands. Furthermore, 120.6 km of roads were built and reconstructed, including 22.3 km of local roads. From 2020, 630 km of local roads have been maintained according to a standard, including a full range of measures to maintain roads in a proper condition. Since the same year, Sakhalin has fully completed upgrading the railway gauge to a network-wide standard.

According to Alexei Kurtov, vice president of the Russian Association of Political Consultants, Limarenko created an effective management team and implemented high-quality digital management of the region.

As noted by political scientist Yevgeny Minchenko, Limarenko is one of the most digitally advanced governors in the Far Eastern Federal District. According to Minchenko, the governor "has significantly restructured the region's management system, included elements of IT, and automated the collection of information and informing the population. These measures resulted in innovations in health care: end-to-end databases have been implemented, and a call center has been organized. The innovations have provided efficient routing of patients and reduced their stress linked to the shortage of medical specialists. Consequently, there was a 30% increase in the number of patients received per month.

According to Galina Dzyuba, a Sakhalin Region Public Chamber member, Limarenko has raised the region's investment appeal rating in the Agency for Strategic Initiatives list from 40th place to fifth. Furthermore, between 2020 and 2022, the region has moved upwards from the 30th to eighth place in the National Investment Climate Registry.

The support of the governor and the government allowed Sakhalin manufacturers to implement major investment projects, increase production rates, and expand the range of products. Inna Pavlenko, Minister of Agriculture and Trade of the Sakhalin Region, reported in 2022 that the region received extensive government support for the agro-industrial complex and trade in more than 40 areas. As a result, over three years, the regional self-sufficiency in milk has increased 1.5 times, and in meat - 1.2 times. Also, 100% of the population's demand for fresh cucumbers and more than 90% for tomatoes have been met. While the regional government annually allocated about 3 billion rubles for the support and development of agricultural enterprises, by September 2022, 3.5 billion rubles have already been assigned to this sector. Regional manufacturers cover two-thirds of the region's demand for milk and dairy products and 50% of the demand for pork.

In 2021, Limarenko initiated a program to provide the region's residents with freshly-caught fish that would come directly from fishing companies. Overall, in 2021, residents received 285 tons of fresh fish; in the first eight months of 2022, they received 356 tons.

In the summer of 2020, Limarenko launched another program to pay islanders for information on the coordinates of illegal garbage dumpsites. Moreover, the regional authorities organized competitions to search for illegal dumpsites with the help of drones. In the project's first year, 2,500 unauthorized dumpsites were located and eliminated; in the summer of 2022 - more than a thousand.

One of the governor's priorities is the development of healthcare in the Sakhalin Region. Between 2019 and 2022, the regional budget allocated more than 104 billion rubles for healthcare. The funding allowed to upgrade the material and technical base of medical institutions, including the purchase of expensive high-tech equipment, repair the buildings of medical institutions, and ensure the proper functioning of medical organizations. In addition, Limarenko initiated a program of an in-depth examination of citizens over 65 years. In 2021, about 73 000 residents of the Sakhalin region received comprehensive health examinations. It is estimated that in 2022 90,000 people will be provided with in-depth examinations. For this purpose, sixteen diagnostic centers were opened in the region. Furthermore, the Smart Feldsher and Obstetrician Center project was also implemented. As a result, ten first-aid and obstetric stations received equipment for medical examinations and remote data transmission. Consequently, about 2500 thousand people were examined with the help of SMART technologies, so they did not have to travel to district centers or Yuzhno-Sakhalinsk. Finally, the twenty-four-hour "1-300" service was implemented. It allows one to book a medical appointment or call a doctor at home, write a prescription without going to a hospital, and receive practical advice about the work of medical institutions and the procedure for providing medical care.

The authorities also aim at improving the region's tourist attractiveness. From 2019 to 2021, the following measures were implemented to provide the infrastructure minimum on fourteen priority touristic routes of the island: more than 30 modern toilet modules and 90 tourist navigation signs were installed, and over ten viewing platforms and socially significant places were set up. In 2022, a diving center was opened on Moneron Island. In August of the same year, a 50-passenger catamaran was launched to the island, thus significantly increasing the accessibility of the nature park.

From 2019 to 2022, 5695 places in general schools and 710 places in preschool institutions were opened for children in the Sakhalin region.

In 2020, the governor initiated a program to provide the Sakhalin Region with natural gas. As of 2022, work is being carried out to reconstruct heating, water supply, and sewage networks and to switch to energy-efficient technologies, which will significantly reduce atmospheric emissions.

== Sanctions ==
In February 2023, the Office of Foreign Assets Control of the United States Department of the Treasury added Limarenko to the Specially Designated Nationals and Blocked Persons List due to his involvement in the enforcement of the conscription of Russian citizens in response to the 2022 mobilization order during the Russian invasion of Ukraine.

== Personal life ==
Limarenko is married to Marina Anatolyevna, who graduated from the Tula State University with a degree in Robotics and worked as a designer. They have two sons and several grandchildren.

== Awards and honors ==
- Order of Alexander Nevsky (2016): for the achieved labor success and many years of conscientious work.
- Order of Honour (2010): for great contributions to the development of nuclear energy, and ensuring the physical and energy start-up of Unit No.2 of the Rostov Nuclear Power Plant.
- Order of St. Sergius of Radonezh, third class
- Order of the Monk Seraphim of Sarov, third and second classes
