= 2025 Sverdlovsk Oblast gubernatorial election =

Russian gubernatorial election

- 12–14 September 2025
- Turnout: 39.89% ▲11.44 pp
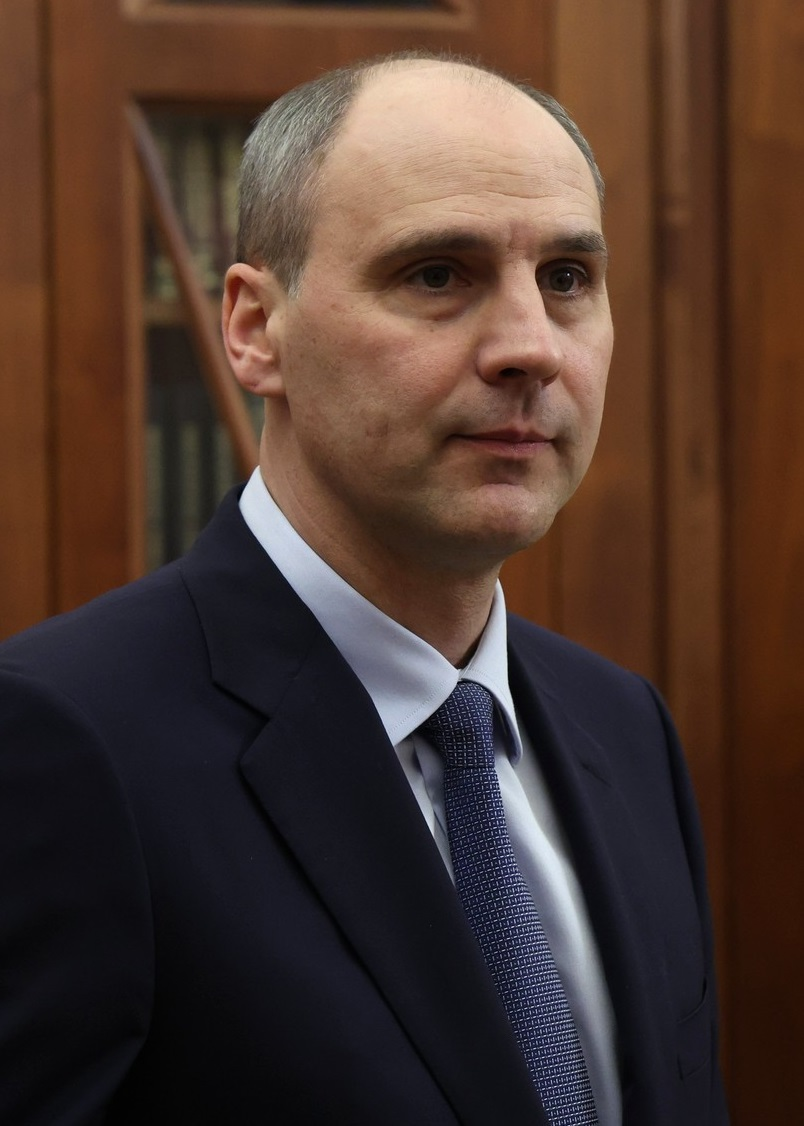

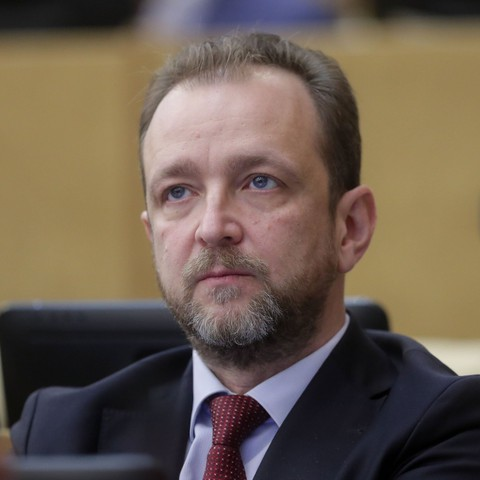
Candidate	Denis Pasler	Aleksandr Ivachyov
Party	United Russia	CPRF
Popular vote	805,868	200,410
Percentage	61.30%	15.25%
		LDPR
Candidate	Andrey Kuznetsov	Aleksandr Kaptyug
Party	SR–ZP	LDPR
Popular vote	166,399	80,084
Percentage	12.66%	6.09%
Governor before election
Denis Pasler (acting)
United Russia
Governor-elect
Denis Pasler
United Russia

The 2025 Sverdlovsk Oblast gubernatorial election took place on 12–14 September 2025, on common election day. Acting Governor of Sverdlovsk Oblast Denis Pasler was elected for a full term in office.

== Background ==
Then-Presidential Envoy to the Ural Federal District Yevgeny Kuyvashev was appointed acting Governor of Sverdlovsk Oblast in May 2012, replacing first-term governor Alexander Misharin who resigned early. Later that month Kuyvashev was confirmed in the position by the Legislative Assembly of Sverdlovsk Oblast. Governor Kuyvashev ran for re-election in 2017 and 2022, winning with 62.16% and 65.78% of the vote. Under Yevgeny Kuyvashev Sverdlovsk Oblast saw dynamic social and economic development, while the governor was successful in managing conflicts in a traditionally politically active and protest-leaning region. For example, Kuyvashev was instrumental in removing opposition Mayor of Yekaterinburg Yevgeny Roizman in 2018 and publicly supported building a church instead of public square in the city that sparked massive protests in 2019, while at the same time protecting Boris Yeltsin Presidential Center and fending off conservative critics, like Nikita Mikhalkov, Vladimir Solovyev and Yevgeny Prigozhin.

Governor Kuyvashev was also mentioned a potential candidate for promotion to the Government of Russia after 2024 Russian presidential election, however, he did not receive an appointment when the Mikhail Mishustin's Second Cabinet was formed in May 2024. In February 2025 Vedomosti reported that Presidential Administration of Russia was looking into replacing Kuyvashev as Governor of Sverdlovsk Oblast in spring or fall of 2025, while Kuyvashev himself denied his intention to resign. Governor of Orenburg Oblast and former Prime Minister of Sverdlovsk Oblast Denis Pasler was viewed as the most likely successor to Kuyvashev, though other candidates reportedly were considered, including recently appointed Presidential Envoy to the Ural Federal District Artem Zhoga, First Deputy Governor of Sverdlovsk Oblast Aleksey Shmykov, Yekaterinburg mayor Aleksey Orlov and Andrey Yarin, Head of the Presidential Office for Internal Policy.

On March 26, 2025, Yevgeny Kuyvashev tendered his resignation, later that day President of Russia Vladimir Putin met with Denis Pasler and asked him to become acting Governor of Sverdlovsk Oblast, which Pasler accepted. Meanwhile, various sources alleged that Kuyvashev would soon receive a new position at the federal level.

== Candidates ==
In Sverdlovsk Oblast candidates for Governor of Sverdlovsk Oblast can be nominated only by registered political parties. Candidate for Governor of Sverdlovsk Oblast should be a Russian citizen and at least 30 years old. Candidates for Governor of Sverdlovsk Oblast should not have a foreign citizenship or residence permit. Each candidate in order to be registered is required to collect at least 7.9% of signatures of members and heads of municipalities. Also gubernatorial candidates present 3 candidacies to the Federation Council and election winner later appoints one of the presented candidates.

=== Declared ===
Candidate name, political party		Occupation	Status	Ref.
Aleksandr Ivachyov; Communist Party		Deputy Chairman of the Legislative Assembly of Sverdlovsk Oblast (2021–present); Member of the Legislative Assembly (2016–present); 2022 gubernatorial candidate	Registered	
Aleksandr Kaptyug; Liberal Democratic Party		Member of Legislative Assembly of Sverdlovsk Oblast (2021–present); 2022 gubernatorial candidate	Registered	
Rant Krayev (Note: until April 2025 known as Rant Agadzhanyan); New People		Member of Legislative Assembly of Sverdlovsk Oblast (2021–present)	Registered	
Andrey Kuznetsov; SR–ZP	Andrey Kuznetsov	Member of State Duma (2021–present); 2022 gubernatorial candidate	Registered	
Denis Pasler; United Russia	Denis Pasler	Acting Governor of Sverdlovsk Oblast (2025–present); Former Governor of Orenburg Oblast (2019–2025)	Registered	
Dinamudin Sadikhov; Civic Initiative		Journalist	Failed to qualify	
Ivan Volkov; Russian All-People's Union		Lawyer; 2017 and 2022 gubernatorial candidate	Failed to qualify	
Stanislav Naumov; Liberal Democratic Party	Stanislav Naumov	Member of State Duma (2021–present)	Withdrew	

=== Eliminated in the primary ===
- Aleksey Orlov (United Russia), Mayor of Yekaterinburg (2020–present)

=== Declined ===
- Alexander Demin (New People), Member of State Duma (2021–present), 2022 gubernatorial candidate
- Sergey Kozlov (New People), Member of Yekaterinburg City Duma (2023–present)

=== Candidates for Federation Council ===
Head candidate, political party	Candidates for Federation Council	Status
Aleksandr Ivachyov; Communist Party	* Yevgeny Bukreyev, Member of Legislative Assembly of Sverdlovsk Oblast (2021–present) * Oleg Gordeyev, Member of Legislative Assembly of Sverdlovsk Oblast (2021–present) * Rimma Skomorokhova, Member of Legislative Assembly of Sverdlovsk Oblast (2021–present)	Registered
Aleksandr Kaptyug; Liberal Democratic Party	* Yevgeny Klimov, city polyclinic deputy general director * Ksenia Leshchenko, Member of Yekaterinburg City Duma (2023–present) * Aleksandr Panasenko, Member of Pervouralsk City Duma (2012–2017, 2022–present), businessman	Registered
Rant Krayev; New People	* Dmitry Dymshakov, furniture businessman * Nikita Lezhankin, former sports gymnast * Olga Zyryanova, Ural Federal University sociology senior lecturer	Registered
Andrey Kuznetsov; SR–ZP	* Maksim Chiryshev, Russian Army soldier * Aleksey Korovkin, Member of Novaya Lyalya Duma (2022–present), ambulance paramedic * Yekaterina Yesina, Member of Legislative Assembly of Sverdlovsk Oblast (2021–present)	Registered
Denis Pasler; United Russia	* Lyudmila Babushkina, Chairwoman of the Legislative Assembly of Sverdlovsk Oblast (2011–present) * Aleksey Orlov, Mayor of Yekaterinburg (2020–present) * Viktor Sheptiy, incumbent Senator (2022–present)	Registered
Dinamudin Sadikhov; Civic Initiative	* Sergey Borozdin, businessman * Ilona Reinhardt, Ural State Law University senior lecturer * Natalya Sheychenko, housing cooperative co-founder	Failed to qualify

== Finances ==
All sums are in rubles.

Financial Report	Source	Ivachyov	Kaptyug	Krayev	Kuznetsov	Pasler	Sadikhov
First		900,000	266,600	8,196,585	929,640	25,000,000	249,320
Final		4,950,000	4,676,600	28,867,585	6,119,280	59,007,500	249,320

== Polls ==
Fieldwork date	Polling firm	Pasler	Ivachyov	Kuznetsov	Kaptyug	Krayev	None	Lead
14 September 2025	2025 election	61.3	15.3	12.7	6.1	2.7	2.0	46.0
5–19 August 2025	WCIOM	54.1	14.8	11.3	7.6	9.9	2.3	39.3

== Results ==
Summary of the 12–14 September 2025 Sverdlovsk Oblast gubernatorial election results
Candidate	Party	Votes	%
Denis Pasler (incumbent)	United Russia	805,868	61.30
Aleksandr Ivachyov	Communist Party	200,410	15.25
Andrey Kuznetsov	A Just Russia – For Truth	166,399	12.66
Aleksandr Kaptyug	Liberal Democratic Party	80,084	6.09
Rant Krayev	New People	35,811	2.72
Valid votes		1,288,572	98.02
Blank ballots		26,005	1.98
Total		1,314,577	100.00
Turnout		1,314,577	39.89
Registered voters		3,295,327	100.00

Governor Pasler re-appointed incumbent Senator Viktor Sheptiy (United Russia) to the Federation Council.

== See also ==
- 2025 Russian regional elections
