= 2026 Sverdlovsk Oblast legislative election =

Regional legislative election in Russia

- 18–20 September 2026

All 50 seats in the Legislative Assembly 26 seats needed for a majority
- Turnout: 47.71% ▼0.11 pp
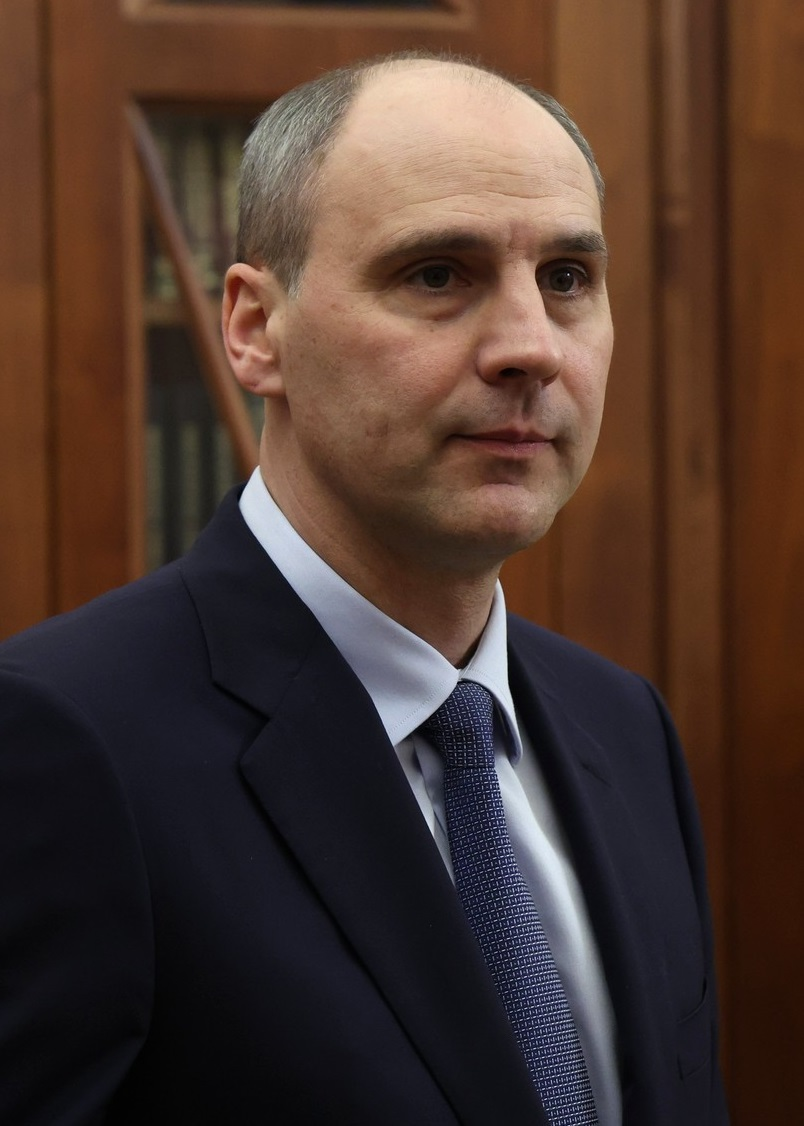

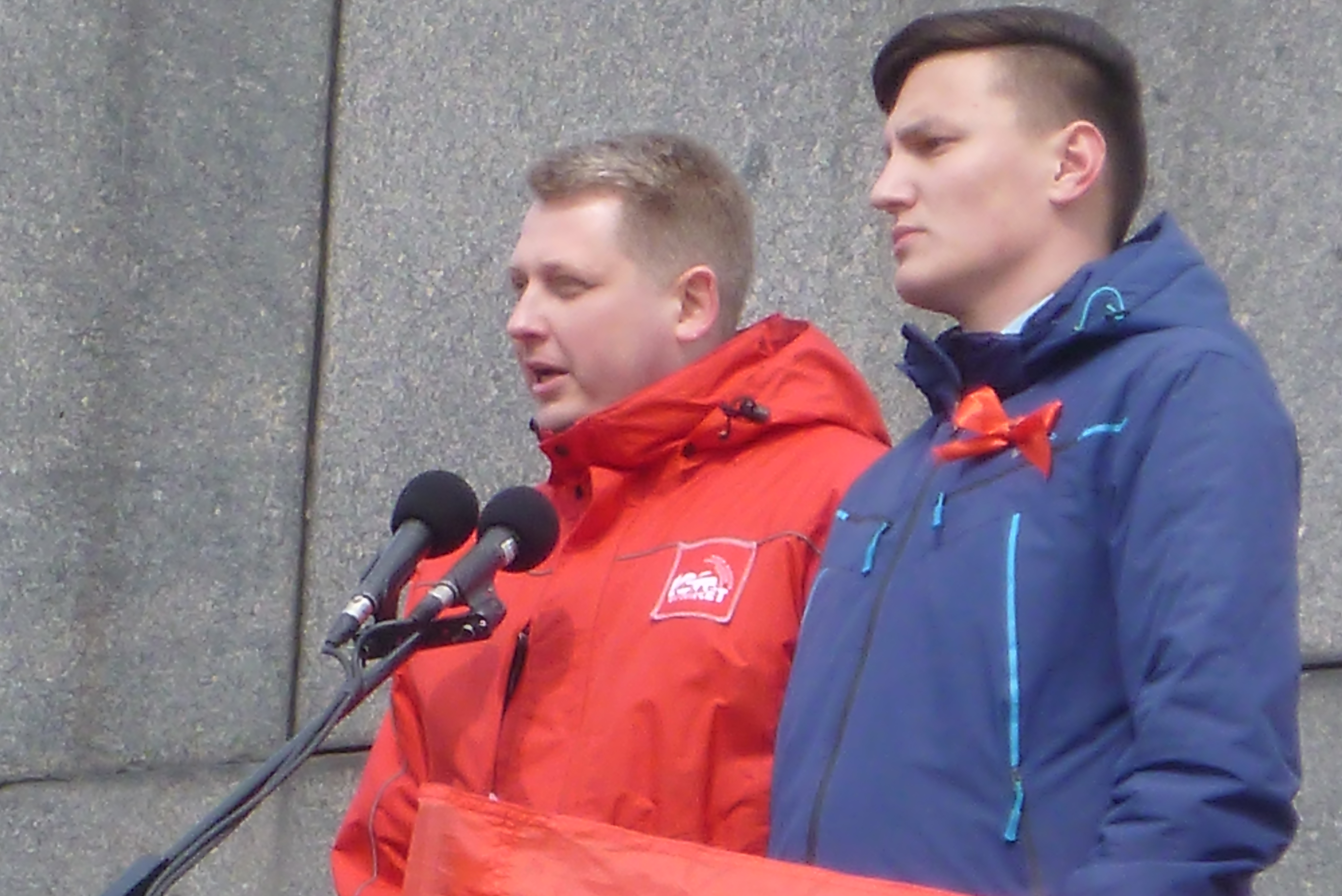

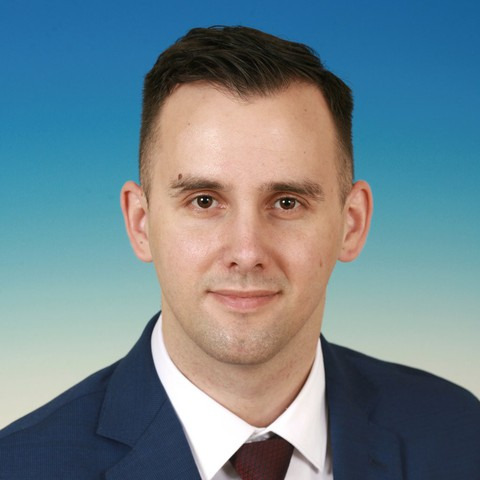

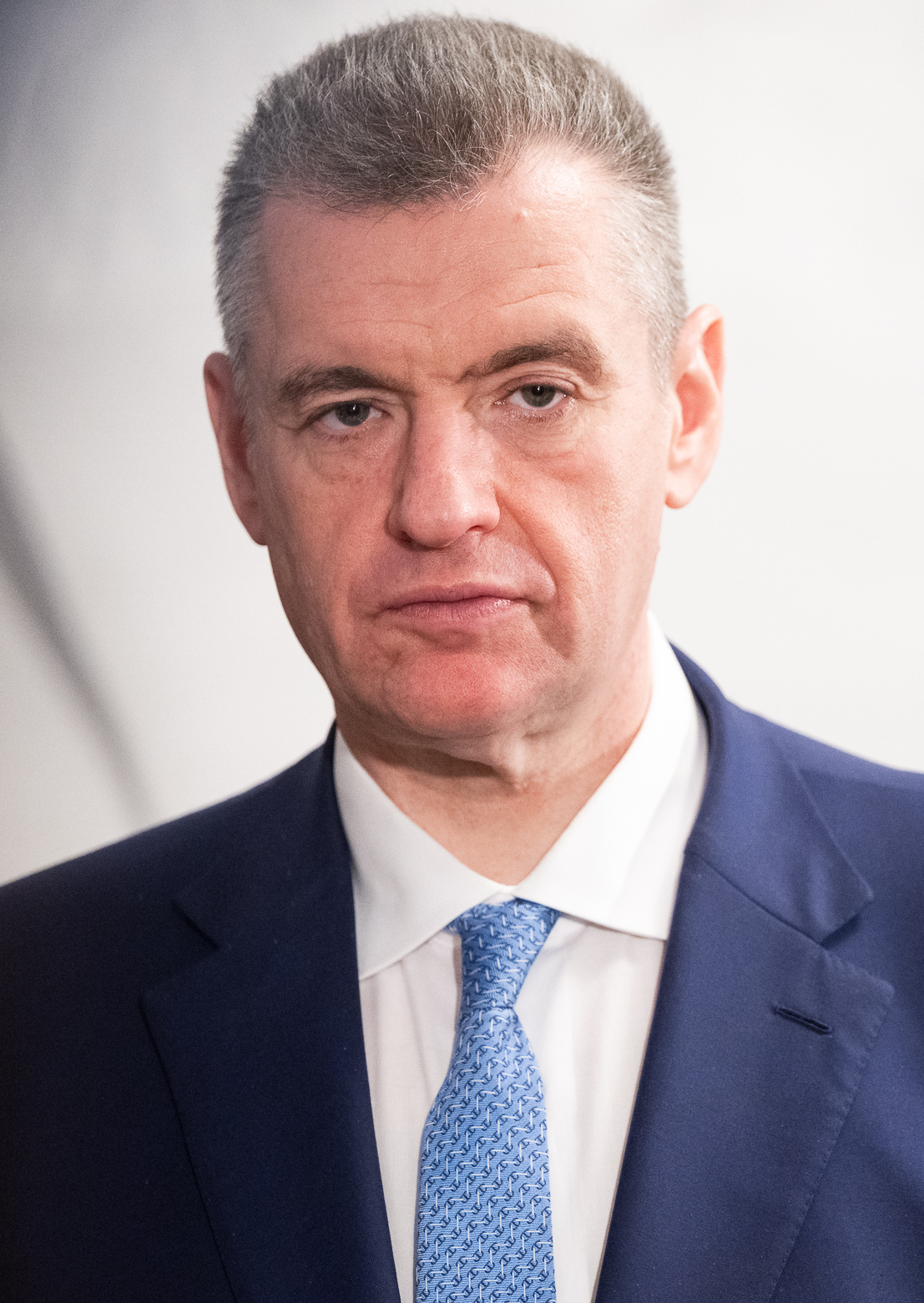

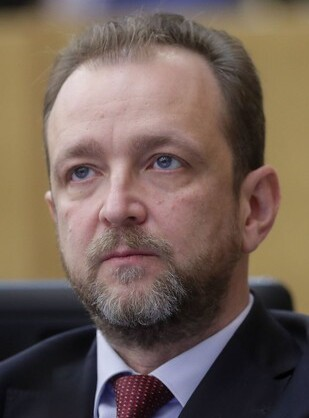
	Majority party	Minority party	Third party
Candidate	Denis Pasler	Aleksandr Ivachyov	Alexander Demin
Party	United Russia	CPRF	New People
Last election	35.56%, 33 seats	22.98%, 9 seats	9.19%, 2 seats
Seats won	36	5	4
Seat change	▲3	▼4	▲2
Popular vote	669,137	304,478	226,527
Percentage	42.26%	19.23%	14.31%
Swing	▲6.70 pp	▼3.75 pp	▲5.12 pp
	Fourth party	Fifth party
Candidate	Leonid Slutsky	Andrey Kuznetsov
Party	LDPR	A Just Russia
Last election	9.35%, 2 seats	14.50%, 4 seats
Seats won	3	2
Seat change	▲1	▼2
Popular vote	178,806	152,795
Percentage	11.29%	9.65%
Swing	▲1.94 pp	▼4.85 pp
Chairman before election
Lyudmila Babushkina
United Russia
Elected Chairman
Dmitry Zhukov
United Russia
Senator before election
Alexander Vysokinsky
United Russia
Senator after election
Aleksey Orlov
United Russia

The 2026 Legislative Assembly of Sverdlovsk Oblast election took place on 18–20 September 2026, on common election day, coinciding with the 2026 Russian legislative election. All 50 seats in the Legislative Assembly were up for re-election.

United Russia increased its majority in the Legislative Assembly, winning 42.3% of the vote and all 25 single-mandate constituencies. Communist Party of the Russian Federation and A Just Russia saw significant losses with their factions reduced to 5 and 2 members. New People and Liberal Democratic Party of Russia gained several seats, pushing A Just Russia to fifth place.

== Electoral system ==
Under current election laws, the Legislative Assembly is elected for a term of five years, with parallel voting. 25 seats are elected by party-list proportional representation with a 5% electoral threshold, with the other half elected in 25 single-member constituencies by first-past-the-post voting. Seats in the proportional part are allocated using the Imperiali quota, modified to ensure that every party list, which passes the threshold, receives at least one mandate.

== Candidates ==
=== Party lists ===
To register regional lists of candidates, parties need to collect 0.5% of signatures of all registered voters in Sverdlovsk Oblast.

The following parties were relieved from the necessity to collect signatures:

- United Russia
- Communist Party of the Russian Federation
- Liberal Democratic Party of Russia
- A Just Russia
- New People
- Yabloko

No.	Party	Oblast-wide list	Candidates	Territorial groups	Status
1	United Russia	Denis Pasler • Maksim Sholomov • Arkady Chernetsky	78	25	Registered
3	Liberal Democratic Party	Leonid Slutsky • Andrey Burgart • Vladimir Kuznetsov	74	25	Registered
4	A Just Russia	Andrey Kuznetsov • Yekaterina Yesina • Maksim Chiryshev	78	25	Registered
5	Communist Party	Aleksandr Ivachyov • Nikolay Ezersky • Rimma Skomorokhova	76	25	Registered
6	New People	Alexander Demin • Rant Krayev • Leonid Khayutin	75	25	Registered
~~2~~	Yabloko	Konstantin Kiselyov • Tatyana Gorshkaleva • Aleksey Kholodarev	71	25	Disqualified
	Rodina	Pyotr Yanochkin • Dmitry Shumilov • Pavel Timofeyev	70	25	Failed to qualify

Green Alternative and Party of Growth, which participated in the last election, were dissolved and merged into Russian Ecological Party "The Greens" and New People, respectively. Yabloko was initially registered for the legislative election but was disqualified on August 28, 2026, by the Sverdlovsk Oblast Court for unlawful social media campaigning.

=== Single-mandate constituencies ===
25 single-mandate constituencies were formed in Sverdlovsk Oblast. To register candidates in single-mandate constituencies need to collect 3% of signatures of registered voters in the constituency.

Number of candidates in single-mandate constituencies
Party	Candidates	
Party	Nominated	Registered
United Russia	25	25
Communist Party	25	25
A Just Russia	25	25
Liberal Democratic Party	23	23
New People	24	23
Yabloko	18	14
Independent	9	0
Total	149	135

== Results ==
=== Results by party lists ===
Summary of the 18–20 September 2026 Legislative Assembly of Sverdlovsk Oblast election results
Party	Party list					Constituency		Total	
Party	Votes	%	±pp	Seats	+/–	Seats	+/–	Seats	+/–
United Russia	669,137	42.26	▲6.70	11	▲1	25	▲2	36	▲3
Communist Party	304,478	19.23	▼3.75	5	▼2	0	▼2	5	▼4
New People	226,527	14.31	▲5.12	4	▲2	0	Steady	4	▲2
Liberal Democratic Party	178,806	11.29	▲1.94	3	▲1	0	Steady	3	▲1
A Just Russia	152,795	9.65	▼4.85	2	▼2	0	Steady	2	▼2
Yabloko	–	–	–	–	–	0	Steady	0	Steady
Invalid ballots	51,661	3.26	▼0.49	—	—	—	—	—	—
Total	1,583,404	100.00	—	25	Steady	25	Steady	50	Steady
Turnout	1,583,404	47.71	▼0.11	—	—	—	—	—	—
Registered voters	3,318,939	100.00	—	—	—	—	—	—	—

Deputy Chairman Dmitry Zhukov (United Russia) was elected Chairman of the Legislative Assembly, replacing longtime outgoing Chairwoman Lyudmila Babushkina (United Russia), who was in turn elected as his first deputy. Former Yekaterinburg mayor Aleksey Orlov (United Russia) was appointed to the Federation Council, replacing incumbent Senator Alexander Vysokinsky (United Russia).

=== Results in single-member constituencies ===
==== District 1 ====
Summary of the 18–20 September 2026 Legislative Assembly of Sverdlovsk Oblast election in Alapayevsky constituency No.1
Candidate	Party	Votes	%
Yevgeny Starkov (incumbent)	United Russia	29,036	46.08%
Konstantin Kostin	Liberal Democratic Party	8,560	13.59%
Timofey Mogila	Communist Party	8,295	13.17%
Kirill Ryaposov	A Just Russia	6,273	9.86%
Olga Naumik	New People	5,081	8.06%
Larisa Pinayeva	Yabloko	2,501	3.97%
Total		63,007	100%

==== District 2 ====
Summary of the 18–20 September 2026 Legislative Assembly of Sverdlovsk Oblast election in Asbestovsky constituency No.2
Candidate	Party	Votes	%
Mikhail Zubarev (incumbent)	United Russia	24,805	38.02%
Yevgeny Shabanov	Communist Party	15,699	24.06%
Natalya Musalnikova	New People	9,051	13.87%
Aleksandr Kaptyug	Liberal Democratic Party	7,107	10.89%
Yegor Perminov	A Just Russia	5,285	8.10%
Total		65,246	100%

==== District 3 ====
Summary of the 18–20 September 2026 Legislative Assembly of Sverdlovsk Oblast election in Beloyarsky constituency No.3
Candidate	Party	Votes	%
Vyacheslav Wegner (incumbent)	United Russia	23,352	39.15%
Zakhar Kazantsev	Communist Party	9,797	16.43%
Yevgeny Popov	A Just Russia	6,591	11.05%
Roman Zhukov	New People	6,509	10.91%
Oleg Pushkarev	Liberal Democratic Party	5,585	9.36%
Yelizaveta Shmakova	Yabloko	5,183	8.69%
Total		59,643	100%

==== District 4 ====
Summary of the 18–20 September 2026 Legislative Assembly of Sverdlovsk Oblast election in Bogdanovichsky constituency No.4
Candidate	Party	Votes	%
Lyudmila Babushkina (incumbent)	United Russia	40,356	59.60%
Vladimir Lyzhin	Communist Party	9,398	13.88%
Nikita Gribkov	A Just Russia	5,147	7.60%
Ravil Bekseleyev	Liberal Democratic Party	3,977	5.87%
Vyacheslav Yevlanov	New People	3,822	5.64%
Viktor Khrunev	Yabloko	2,870	4.24%
Total		67,709	100%

==== District 5 ====
Summary of the 18–20 September 2026 Legislative Assembly of Sverdlovsk Oblast election in Beryozovsky constituency No.5
Candidate	Party	Votes	%
Yevgeny Pistsov	United Russia	20,818	39.49%
Andrey Pinyazhin	Communist Party	8,938	16.95%
Rant Krayev	New People	8,337	15.81%
Yekaterina Burmak	A Just Russia	7,535	14.29%
Vyacheslav Moskvin	Liberal Democratic Party	4,878	9.25%
Total		52,717	100%

==== District 6 ====
Summary of the 18–20 September 2026 Legislative Assembly of Sverdlovsk Oblast election in Verkh-Isetsky constituency No.6
Candidate	Party	Votes	%
Sergey Melekhin (incumbent)	United Russia	16,763	30.73%
Irina Vinogradova	New People	12,805	23.47%
Nikolay Nikolayev	Communist Party	10,847	19.88%
Maria Boyarskaya	Liberal Democratic Party	6,620	12.14%
Vitaly Sukhov	A Just Russia	5,517	10.11%
Total		54,552	100%

==== District 7 ====
Summary of the 18–20 September 2026 Legislative Assembly of Sverdlovsk Oblast election in Zheleznodorozhny constituency No.7
Candidate	Party	Votes	%
Dmitry Nozhenko	United Russia	15,955	31.08%
Danila Popov	Communist Party	8,455	16.47%
Pavel Kargin	New People	7,548	14.70%
Konstantin Abaturov	A Just Russia	6,814	13.27%
Galina Lysenko	Yabloko	5,835	11.37%
Yelena Silivonchik	Liberal Democratic Party	4,944	9.63%
Total		51,332	100%

==== District 8 ====
Summary of the 18–20 September 2026 Legislative Assembly of Sverdlovsk Oblast election in Kirovsky constituency No.8
Candidate	Party	Votes	%
Mikhail Klimenko (incumbent)	United Russia	18,657	37.77%
Olesya Plechko	Communist Party	12,555	25.41%
Aleksandr Bosykh	A Just Russia	9,952	20.15%
Aleksandr Tutynin	Liberal Democratic Party	5,779	11.70%
Total		49,401	100%

==== District 9 ====
Summary of the 18–20 September 2026 Legislative Assembly of Sverdlovsk Oblast election in Leninsky constituency No.9
Candidate	Party	Votes	%
Viktor Maslakov (incumbent)	United Russia	22,817	37.93%
Dmitry Dymshakov	New People	8,339	13.86%
Dmitry Duma	Communist Party	8,301	13.80%
Olga Lopareva	Yabloko	7,625	12.68%
Denis Karakoz	A Just Russia	6,120	10.17%
Natalya Grekhova	Liberal Democratic Party	5,418	9.01%
Total		60,149	100%

==== District 10 ====
Summary of the 18–20 September 2026 Legislative Assembly of Sverdlovsk Oblast election in Oktyabrsky constituency No.10
Candidate	Party	Votes	%
Yevgeny Zyablitsev (incumbent)	United Russia	20,386	41.48%
Svetlana Vyatkina	Yabloko	7,182	14.62%
Arseny Artyukh	New People	6,766	13.77%
Sergey Savchenko	Communist Party	6,429	13.08%
Denis Khavantsev	A Just Russia	4,021	8.18%
Yekaterina Zuyeva	Liberal Democratic Party	3,194	6.50%
Total		49,141	100%

==== District 11 ====
Summary of the 18–20 September 2026 Legislative Assembly of Sverdlovsk Oblast election in Ordzhonikidzevsky constituency No.11
Candidate	Party	Votes	%
Anton Shipulin	United Russia	20,138	41.31%
Tatyana Zakirova	Communist Party	8,312	17.05%
Alyona Kirillova	Yabloko	5,509	11.30%
Nikita Lezhankin	New People	5,312	10.90%
Yelena Rudakova	Liberal Democratic Party	4,420	9.07%
Ainur Akhtyamov	A Just Russia	3,555	7.29%
Total		48,747	100%

==== District 12 ====
Summary of the 18–20 September 2026 Legislative Assembly of Sverdlovsk Oblast election in Chkalovsky constituency No.12
Candidate	Party	Votes	%
Sergey Pavlenko	United Russia	14,934	28.15%
Viktoria Ivachyova	Communist Party	11,556	21.78%
Mikhail Osintsev	New People	7,924	14.94%
Viktor Chupriyanov	Yabloko	6,041	11.39%
Vera Mikushina	A Just Russia	5,993	11.30%
Yevgeny Kolomytsev	Liberal Democratic Party	5,106	9.62%
Total		53,052	100%

==== District 13 ====
Summary of the 18–20 September 2026 Legislative Assembly of Sverdlovsk Oblast election in Irbitsky constituency No.13
Candidate	Party	Votes	%
Grigory Bacherikov	United Russia	33,625	53.16%
Natalya Bazhenova	A Just Russia	10,365	16.39%
Mikhail Zakharov	Communist Party	9,791	15.48%
Ilya Ilyinykh	Liberal Democratic Party	7,299	11.54%
Total		63,250	100%

==== District 14 ====
Summary of the 18–20 September 2026 Legislative Assembly of Sverdlovsk Oblast election in Kamensk-Uralsky constituency No.14
Candidate	Party	Votes	%
Viktor Yakimov (incumbent)	United Russia	18,594	30.78%
Olga Bakhareva	Communist Party	16,779	27.77%
Ruslan Biktashev	New People	12,254	20.28%
Denis Kochnev	A Just Russia	9,570	15.84%
Total		60,414	100%

==== District 15 ====
Summary of the 18–20 September 2026 Legislative Assembly of Sverdlovsk Oblast election in Verkhnepyshminsky constituency No.15
Candidate	Party	Votes	%
Aleksey Smirnov	United Russia	30,537	48.93%
Rimma Skomorokhova	Communist Party	8,816	14.13%
Olesya Orlova	A Just Russia	7,477	11.98%
Andrey Shchepin	Liberal Democratic Party	5,218	8.36%
Alan Tsekoyev	New People	4,279	6.86%
Leonid Buyny	Yabloko	3,876	6.21%
Total		62,411	100%

==== District 16 ====
Summary of the 18–20 September 2026 Legislative Assembly of Sverdlovsk Oblast election in Krasnoturyinsky constituency No.16
Candidate	Party	Votes	%
Pyotr Sokolyuk (incumbent)	United Russia	34,615	47.47%
Andrey Bychkov	Communist Party	9,858	13.52%
Yury Shirokikh	A Just Russia	8,604	11.80%
Aleksey Nikitin	New People	8,596	11.79%
Aleksey Bykov	Liberal Democratic Party	8,321	11.41%
Total		72,916	100%

==== District 17 ====
Summary of the 18–20 September 2026 Legislative Assembly of Sverdlovsk Oblast election in Krasnouralsky constituency No.17
Candidate	Party	Votes	%
Sergey Zhamilov	United Russia	31,247	42.89%
Gabbas Dautov	Communist Party	11,436	15.70%
Valery Molokov	New People	8,337	11.44%
Roman Novikov	A Just Russia	8,209	11.27%
Sergey Chichikalo	Liberal Democratic Party	6,938	9.52%
Aleksandra Skoropolitova	Yabloko	3,079	4.23%
Total		72,856	100%

==== District 18 ====
Summary of the 18–20 September 2026 Legislative Assembly of Sverdlovsk Oblast election in Krasnoufimsky constituency No.18
Candidate	Party	Votes	%
Albert Abzalov (incumbent)	United Russia	36,291	51.33%
Sergey Medov	Communist Party	16,021	22.66%
Aleksey Fomin	New People	5,963	8.43%
Aleksey Kessler	A Just Russia	5,246	7.42%
Rustam Nizamov	Liberal Democratic Party	4,637	6.56%
Total		70,704	100%

==== District 19 ====
Summary of the 18–20 September 2026 Legislative Assembly of Sverdlovsk Oblast election in Dzerzhinsky constituency No.19
Candidate	Party	Votes	%
Vladimir Roshchupkin (incumbent)	United Russia	25,207	40.24%
Mikhail Boyarkin	Communist Party	15,512	24.76%
Aleksandr Medvedev	New People	6,988	11.15%
Lyubov Martyanova	A Just Russia	6,394	10.21%
Irina Prokopyeva	Liberal Democratic Party	6,053	9.66%
Total		62,647	100%

==== District 20 ====
Summary of the 18–20 September 2026 Legislative Assembly of Sverdlovsk Oblast election in Leninsky constituency No.20
Candidate	Party	Votes	%
Vyacheslav Pogudin (incumbent)	United Russia	19,064	32.56%
Dmitry Nikanorov	Communist Party	12,910	22.05%
Yekaterina Vasina	A Just Russia	10,204	17.43%
Dmitry Glebov	New People	9,020	15.40%
Vyacheslav Smirnov	Yabloko	5,086	8.69%
Total		58,557	100%

==== District 21 ====
Summary of the 18–20 September 2026 Legislative Assembly of Sverdlovsk Oblast election in Tagilstroyevsky constituency No.21
Candidate	Party	Votes	%
Vladimir Radayev (incumbent)	United Russia	24,201	41.43%
Fyodor Trachuk	Communist Party	9,409	16.11%
Sergey Kozin	A Just Russia	7,062	12.09%
Yevgeny Lifanov	New People	5,846	10.01%
Vasily Konyakin	Liberal Democratic Party	5,727	9.81%
Nikita Kirillov	Yabloko	4,129	7.07%
Total		58,408	100%

==== District 22 ====
Summary of the 18–20 September 2026 Legislative Assembly of Sverdlovsk Oblast election in Pervouralsky constituency No.22
Candidate	Party	Votes	%
Pavel Bulatov	United Russia	18,736	30.91%
Sergey Latayev	Communist Party	11,804	19.47%
Marina Arzhannikova	A Just Russia	10,085	16.64%
Aleksandr Panasenko	Liberal Democratic Party	9,641	15.90%
Ruslan Borovskikh	New People	7,851	12.95%
Total		60,621	100%

==== District 23 ====
Summary of the 18–20 September 2026 Legislative Assembly of Sverdlovsk Oblast election in Revdinsky constituency No.23
Candidate	Party	Votes	%
Aleksandr Serebrennikov (incumbent)	United Russia	27,480	43.12%
Aleksandr Tyurikov	Communist Party	10,474	16.44%
Veniamin Tarov	A Just Russia	6,829	10.72%
Maksim Antonenko	Liberal Democratic Party	6,229	9.78%
Mikhail Valyavin	New People	5,472	8.59%
Dmitry Yurkov	Yabloko	4,521	7.09%
Total		63,722	100%

==== District 24 ====
Summary of the 18–20 September 2026 Legislative Assembly of Sverdlovsk Oblast election in Serovsky constituency No.24
Candidate	Party	Votes	%
Dmitry Zhukov (incumbent)	United Russia	32,467	47.54%
Igor Chudov	Communist Party	13,355	19.55%
Anton Sharapov	New People	7,457	10.92%
Konstantin Makayev	Liberal Democratic Party	6,289	9.21%
Aleksey Snigiryov	A Just Russia	5,493	8.04%
Total		68,295	100%

==== District 25 ====
Summary of the 18–20 September 2026 Legislative Assembly of Sverdlovsk Oblast election in Sysertsky constituency No.25
Candidate	Party	Votes	%
Sergey Karyakin (incumbent)	United Russia	19,390	33.42%
Oleg Gordeyev	Communist Party	13,356	23.02%
Lyubov Kuntsevich	New People	6,876	11.85%
Vadim Weigult	Liberal Democratic Party	6,268	10.80%
Maksim Chiryshev	A Just Russia	5,874	10.12%
Sergey Loginov	Yabloko	3,969	6.84%
Total		58,025	100%

=== Members ===
Incumbent deputies are highlighted with bold, elected members who declined to take a seat are marked with ~~strikethrough~~.

Constituency
No.	Member	Party
1	Yevgeny Starkov	United Russia
2	Mikhail Zubarev	United Russia
3	Vyacheslav Wegner	United Russia
4	Lyudmila Babushkina	United Russia
5	Yevgeny Pistsov	United Russia
6	Sergey Melekhin	United Russia
7	Dmitry Nozhenko	United Russia
8	Mikhail Klimenko	United Russia
9	Viktor Maslakov	United Russia
10	Yevgeny Zyablitsev	United Russia
11	Anton Shipulin	United Russia
12	Sergey Pavlenko	United Russia
13	Grigory Bacherikov	United Russia
14	Viktor Yakimov	United Russia
15	Aleksey Smirnov	United Russia
16	Pyotr Sokolyuk	United Russia
17	Sergey Zhamilov	United Russia
18	Albert Abzalov	United Russia
19	Vladimir Roshchupkin	United Russia
20	Vyacheslav Pogudin	United Russia
21	Vladimir Radayev	United Russia
22	Pavel Bulatov	United Russia
23	Aleksandr Serebrennikov	United Russia
24	Dmitry Zhukov	United Russia
25	Sergey Karyakin	United Russia

Party lists
Member	Party
~~Denis Pasler~~	United Russia
~~Maksim Sholomov~~	United Russia
Arkady Chernetsky	United Russia
Taras Isakov	United Russia
Nikolay Klevets	United Russia
Vyacheslav Brozovsky	United Russia
Yelena Treskova	United Russia
Alexander Vysokinsky	United Russia
~~Sergey Bidonko~~	United Russia
Yury Biktuganov	United Russia
Sergey Semakin	United Russia
Aleksey Orlov	United Russia
Viktor Babenko	United Russia
Dmitry Tropnikov	United Russia
~~Aleksandr Ivachyov~~	Communist Party
Nikolay Ezersky	Communist Party
Rimma Skomorokhova	Communist Party
Oleg Gordeyev	Communist Party
Nikolay Korobeynikov	Communist Party
Vitaly Ryapisov	Communist Party
~~Alexander Demin~~	New People
Rant Krayev	New People
Leonid Khayutin	New People
Irina Vinogradova	New People
Dmitry Dymshakov	New People
~~Leonid Slutsky~~	Liberal Democratic Party
Andrey Burgart	Liberal Democratic Party
Vladimir Kuznetsov	Liberal Democratic Party
Aleksandr Kaptyug	Liberal Democratic Party
~~Andrey Kuznetsov~~	A Just Russia
Yekaterina Yesina	A Just Russia
Maksim Chiryshev	A Just Russia

== See also ==
- 2026 Russian regional elections
