= 2022 Sverdlovsk Oblast gubernatorial election =

- 11 September 2022
- Turnout: 28.47%
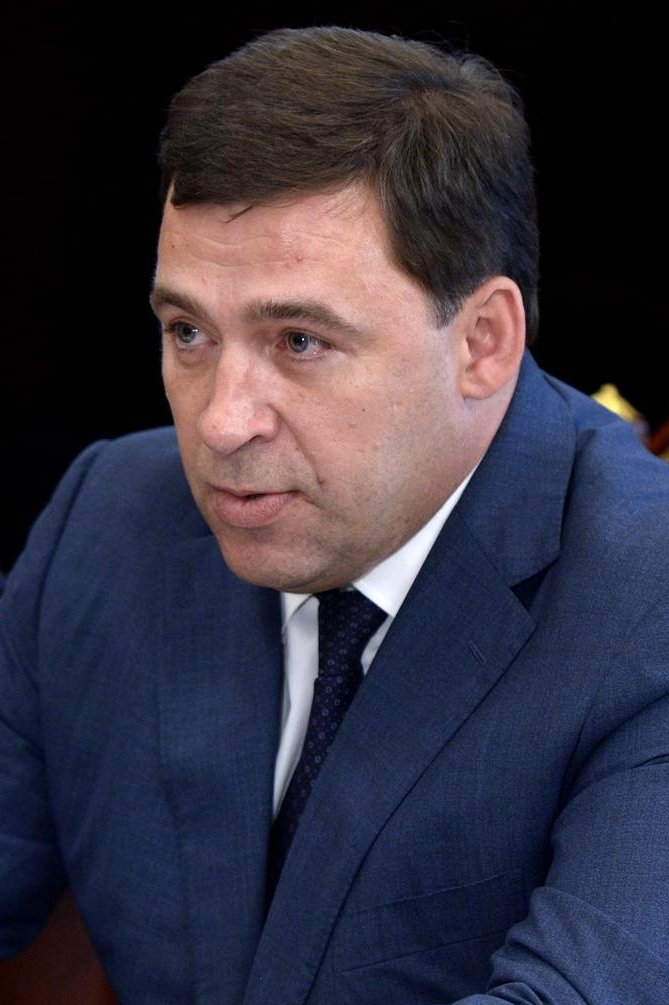

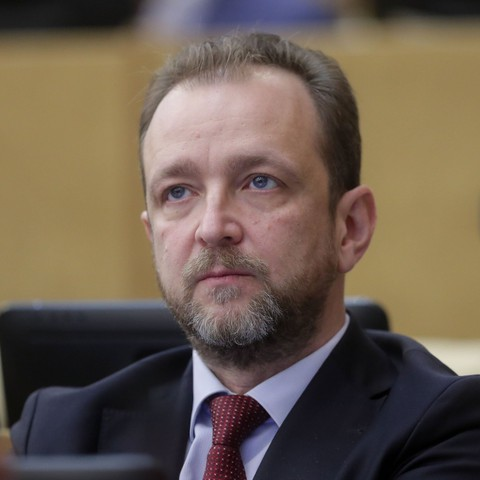

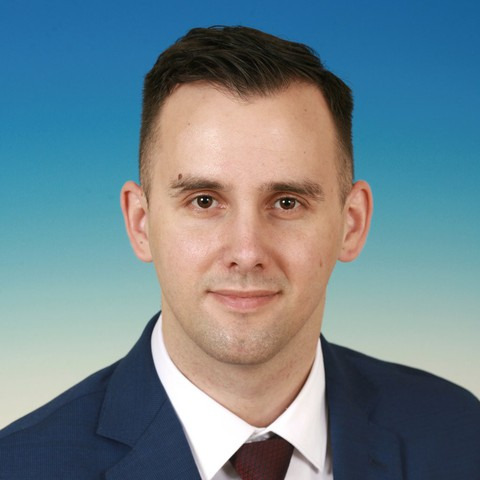
Nominee	Yevgeny Kuyvashev	Aleksandr Ivachyov
Party	United Russia	CPRF
Popular vote	618,617	121,351
Percentage	65.78%	12.90%
Nominee	Andrey Kuznetsov	Alexander Demin
Party	SR-ZP	New People
Popular vote	86,047	60,883
Percentage	9.15%	6.47%
Governor before election
Yevgeny Kuyvashev
United Russia
Elected Governor
Yevgeny Kuyvashev
United Russia

The 2022 Sverdlovsk Oblast gubernatorial election took place on 11 September 2022, on common election day. Governor Yevgeny Kuyvashev was re-elected for a third term.

== Background ==
Presidential Envoy to the Ural Federal District Yevgeny Kuyvashev was appointed acting Governor of Sverdlovsk Oblast in May 2012, and later that month he was confirmed in the position by the Legislative Assembly of Sverdlovsk Oblast. Kuyvashev won his second term in 2017 election with 62.16% of the vote.

Since autumn 2021 rumours spread about Kuyvashev potential resignation, however, the governor generally avoided complaints about his job. In April 2022, Kuyvashev publicly feuded with TV host Vladimir Solovyov after the latter's degrading comments about Yekaterinburg. Despite the rumours and the public conflict, on 20 May President Vladimir Putin endorsed Kuyvashev for reelection.

Due to the start of the Russian invasion of Ukraine in February 2022 and subsequent economic sanctions the cancellation and postponement of direct gubernatorial elections was proposed. The measure was even supported by A Just Russia leader Sergey Mironov. Eventually, on 7 June Legislative Assembly of Sverdlovsk Oblast called the gubernatorial election for 11 September 2022.

== Candidates ==
Only political parties can nominate candidates for gubernatorial election in Sverdlovsk Oblast, self-nomination is not possible. However, candidates are not obliged to be members of the nominating party. Candidate for Governor of Sverdlovsk Oblast should be a Russian citizen and at least 30 years old. Each candidate in order to be registered is required to collect at least 7.9% of signatures of members and heads of municipalities (121-127 signatures). Also, gubernatorial candidates present three candidacies to the Federation Council and election winner later appoints one of the presented candidates.

=== Registered ===
- Alexander Demin (New People), Member of State Duma, Chairman of the Duma Committee on Small and Medium-sized Entrepreneurship
- Aleksandr Ivachyov (CPRF), Deputy Chairman of Legislative Assembly of Sverdlovsk Oblast
- Aleksandr Kaptyug (LDPR), Member of Legislative Assembly of Sverdlovsk Oblast
- Yevgeny Kuyvashev (United Russia), incumbent Governor of Sverdlovsk Oblast
- Andrey Kuznetsov (SR-ZP), Member of State Duma

=== Failed to qualify ===
- Ivan Volkov (ROS), lawyer, 2017 gubernatorial candidate

=== Eliminated at convention ===
- Dmitry Zhukov (United Russia), Member of Legislative Assembly of Sverdlovsk Oblast

=== Declined ===
- Konstantin Kiselyov (Yabloko), Member of Yekaterinburg City Duma, 2017 The Greens gubernatorial candidate
- Yevgeny Roizman (Yabloko), former mayor of Yekaterinburg (2013–2018), former Member of State Duma (2003–2007), 2017 gubernatorial candidate
- Igor Toroshchin (LDPR), former Member of State Duma (2016–2021), 2017 gubernatorial candidate

=== Candidates for Federation Council ===
Incumbent Senator Eduard Rossel (United Russia) was not renominated.

- Aleksandr Demin (New People):
  - Yaroslav Borodin, TV host, actor
  - Tatyana Fleganova, Member of Civic Chamber of Sverdlovsk Oblast, nonprofit executive
  - Aleksey Nevyantsev, entrepreneur
- Aleksandr Ivachyov (CPRF):
  - Yevgeny Bukreyev, Member of Legislative Assembly of Sverdlovsk Oblast, Kirovgrad School No.3 director
  - Taras Isakov, Member of Legislative Assembly of Sverdlovsk Oblast, retired Lieutenant General
  - Rimma Skomorokhova, Member of Legislative Assembly of Sverdlovsk Oblast
- Aleksandr Kaptyug (LDPR):
  - Vladimir Korolkov, LDPR regional office lawyer
  - Kristina Rachkevich, deputy coordinator of LDPR regional office
  - Alyona Vyatkina, economist
- Yevgeny Kuyvashev (United Russia):
  - Irina Levina, co-chair of ONF regional office, Director of Sverdlovsk Oblast Medical College
  - Aleksey Orlov, Mayor of Yekaterinburg
  - Viktor Sheptiy, First Deputy Speaker of Legislative Assembly of Sverdlovsk Oblast
- Andrey Kuznetsov (SR-ZP):
  - Oksana Ivanova, aide to Andrey Kuznetsov, Christian activist
  - Aleksey Korovkin, emergency medical technician
  - Leonid Martyushev, Member of Nizhny Tagil City Duma

== Finances ==
All sums are in rubles.

Financial Report	Source	Demin	Ivachyov	Kaptyug	Kuyvashev	Kuznetsov	Volkov
First		210,000	810,000	191,800	15,000,000	1,230,000	1,000
Final		25,000,000	7,956,000	3,099,062	45,000,000	6,671,500	1,000

== Polls ==
Fieldwork date	Polling firm	Kuyvashev	Demin	Ivachyov	Kuznetsov	Kaptyug	Undecided	Lead
30 August - 3 September 2022	Russian Field	61%	8%	7%	4%	4%	13%	53%

== Results ==
Summary of the 11 September 2022 Sverdlovsk Oblast gubernatorial election results
Candidate	Party	Votes	%
Yevgeny Kuyvashev (incumbent)	United Russia	618,617	65.78
Aleksandr Ivachyov	Communist Party	121,351	12.90
Andrey Kuznetsov	A Just Russia — For Truth	86,047	9.15
Alexander Demin	New People	60,883	6.47
Aleksandr Kaptyug	Liberal Democratic Party	29,857	3.17
Valid votes		916,755	97.49
Blank ballots		23,648	2.51
Total		950,405	100.00
Turnout		950,405	28.47
Registered voters		3,303,323	100.00

Legislative Assembly of Sverdlovsk Oblast First Vice-Speaker Viktor Sheptiy (United Russia) was appointed to the Federation Council, replacing incumbent senator Eduard Rossel (United Russia).

== See also ==
- 2022 Russian gubernatorial elections
