= Dyoma (disambiguation) =

Dyoma is a village in Russia.

Dyoma may also refer to:

- Dyoma, Chishminsky District, Republic of Bashkortostan, village in Bashkortostan, Russia
- Dyoma (river), river in Bashkortostan, Russia
- A diminutive of Demyan
