= Dyomin =

Dyomin or Demin (Russian: Дёмин or Демин), feminine: Dyomina or Demina, is a Russian patronymic surname derived from the given name Dyoma, a diminutive of Demyan. It may refer to:

- Alexander Demin (born 1988), Russian politician
- Eduard Dyomin (born 1974), Russian football manager and former player
- Egor Dëmin (born 2006), Russian basketball player
- Yekaterina Mikhailova-Demina (1925–2019), Russian front-line reconnaissance officer
- Julia Demina (born 1969), Russian chess player
- Lev Dyomin (1926–1998), Russian cosmonaut
- Maxim Demin, Russian businessman
- Oleh Dyomin (born 1947), Ukrainian politician and diplomat
- Svetlana Demina (born 1961), Russian sport shooter
- Victor Dyomin (1937–1993), Russian cinema critic, editor and screenwriter
- Vladimir Dyomin (1921–1966), Russian football player and football coach
- Vyacheslav Dyomin, Russian footballer

== See also ==
- Dyomkin
- 5086 Demin
