= Demyan =

Masculine given name

Demyan (Russian: Демьян, Ukrainian: Дем'ян) is a Russian and Ukrainian masculine given name, a form of Damian. Diminutives: Dyoma, Dyomka. Derived patronymic surnames: Demyanov, Demyanyuk, Demyanchuk, Demyanenko, Dyomin, Dyomkin.

Notable people with the given name include:

- Demyan Bedny (1883–1945), Russian poet, propagandist and satirist
- Demyan Chubatyi (born 2004), Ukrainian footballer
- Demyan Hanul (1993–2025), Ukrainian activist and assassination victim
- Demyan Korotchenko (1894–1969), Ukrainian Soviet politician
- Demyan Kudryavtsev (born 1971), Russian media manager and entrepreneur
