= Alexander Vysokinsky =

Russian politician (born 1973)

- Александр Высокинский
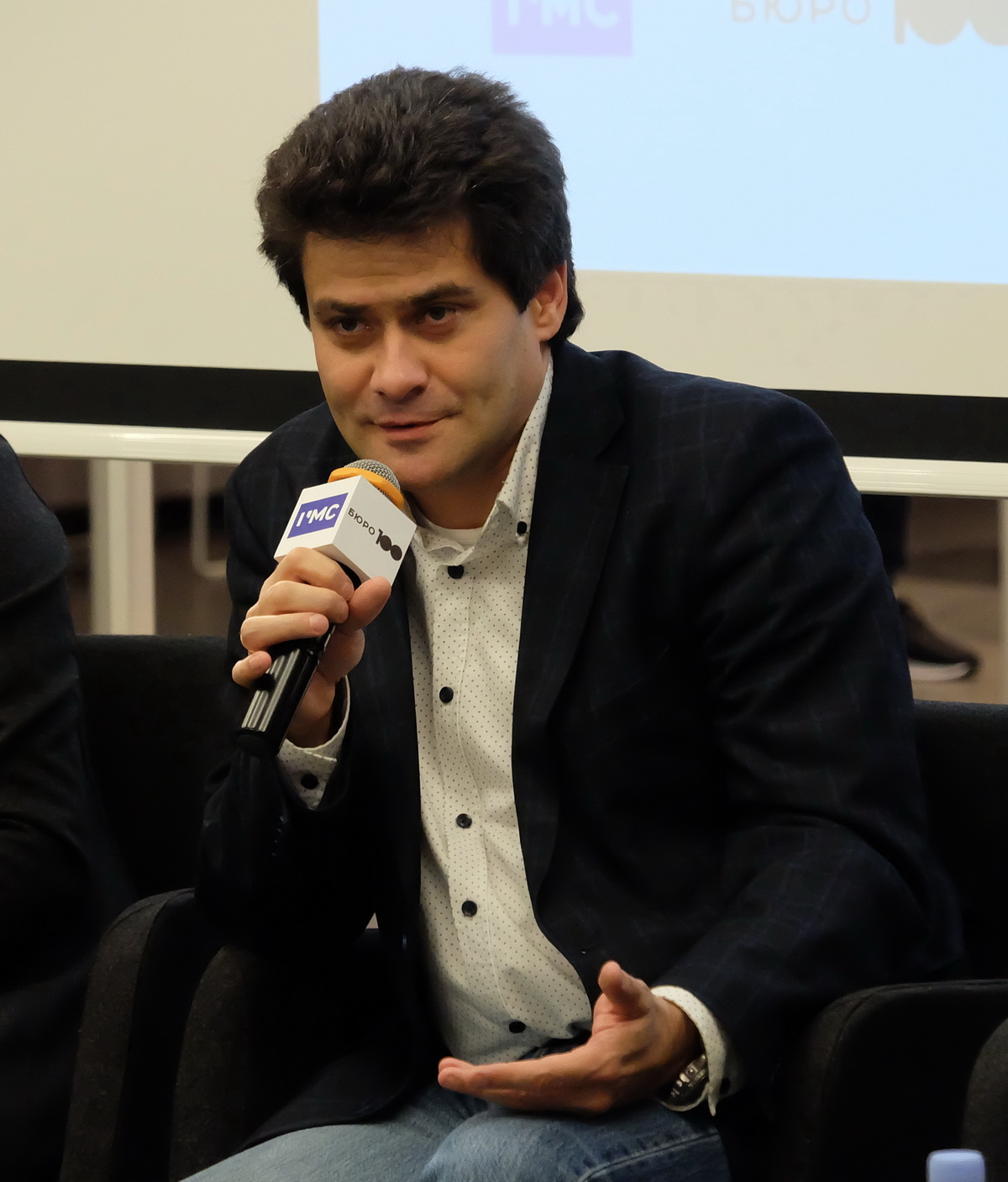

Senator from Sverdlovsk Oblast
- Incumbent
- Assumed office 8 October 2021
- Preceded by: Arkady Chernetsky

First Deputy Governor of Sverdlovsk Oblast
- In office 22 December 2020 – 8 October 2021
- Preceded by: Aleksey Orlov

Acting Governor of Sverdlovsk Oblast
- In office 24 March 2021 – 7 April 2021
- Preceded by: Yevgeny Kuyvashev
- Succeeded by: Yevgeny Kuyvashev

3rd Head of Yekaterinburg
- In office 28 September 2018 – 22 December 2020
- Preceded by: Yevgeny Roizman
- Succeeded by: Aleksey Orlov

Personal details
- Born: Alexander Vysokinsky; 24 September 1973 (age 52) Sverdlovsk, Russian Soviet Socialist Republic, Soviet Union
- Party: United Russia
- Education: Ural Institute of Management

Alexander Gennadyevich Vysokinsky (Russian: Александр Геннадьевич Высокинский; born 24 September 1973) is a Russian politician serving as a senator from Sverdlovsk Oblast since 8 October 2021.

== Biography ==
Alexander Vysokinsky was born 24 September 1973 in Sverdlovsk (now Yekaterinburg). In 1996, he graduated from the Ural Institute of Management. Since December 2000, he was the head of the Department of Competitive Advantages and Investment Attractiveness of the Committee for Economics of the Administration of Yekaterinburg. From May 2002 to June 2008, he was the Chairman of the Economic Committee of the Administration of Yekaterinburg. In 2008 Vysokinsky was appointed the deputy head of Yekaterinburg. From 2016 to 2018, he was the deputy Governor of Sverdlovsk Oblast. On 25 September 2018, he was made mayor of Yekaterinburg, succeeding Yevgeny Roizman after mayoral elections in the city were scrapped earlier that year. On 8 October 2021, he became the senator from the Legislative Assembly of Sverdlovsk Oblast.

=== Sanctions ===
Alexander Vysokinsky is in the list of personal sanctions introduced by the European Union, the United Kingdom, the USA, Canada, Switzerland, Australia, Ukraine, New Zealand, for ratifying the decisions of the "Treaty of Friendship, Cooperation and Mutual Assistance between the Russian Federation and the Donetsk People's Republic and between the Russian Federation and the Luhansk People's Republic" and providing political and economic support for Russia's annexation of Ukrainian territories.
