= Transformation of Ural =

Transformation of Ural Преображение Урала
- Founder: Eduard Rossel
- Founded: 22 November 1993
- Dissolved: 4 February 2013
- Headquarters: Yekaterinburg
- Ideology: Regionalism

Party flag
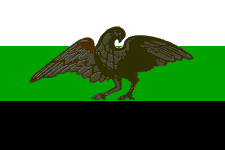

Transformation of Ural (Russian: Преображение Урала, romanized: Preobrazheniye Urala) was a regional political association in Russia, operating in Sverdlovsk Oblast. It participated in 1995 Russian legislative election as Transformation of the Fatherland (Russian: Преображение Отечества, romanized: Preobrazheniye Otechestva).

== Origins ==
In 1993 autonomist movement in Sverdlovsk Oblast resulted in proclaiming the Ural Republic on 31 October. Ten days after the regional leader, the head of administration of Sverdlovsk Oblast Eduard Rossel was removed from office by president Boris Yeltsin, and the republic ceased to exist. Transformation of Ural was founded in November 1993 by Rossel's supporters. Alexey Vorobyov, a close ally of Eduard Rossel, was its initial organizer, and Anton Bakov was Transformation's political coordinator for a long time.

== Electoral history ==
=== Regional level ===
The first elections, in which the Transformation of Ural took part, took place on 10 April 1994. The movement received three out of 28 seats in the Sverdlovsk Oblast Duma. Gaining support from other factions, Rossel was elected chairman of the Duma. The gubernatorial election of 1995 became a key event in the Transformation's history. Eduard Rossel and his successor as the head of administration Alexey Strakhov were the frontrunners. In the second round of elections, Rossel won with 59% of the vote. The 1996 election to the Legislative Assembly was also successful: Transformation won 35.2% and received six mandates out of 14. Two years later, the movement was in for a failure. In the 1998 election, the bloc received only 9.26% of the vote and two seats, overtaken by the "Our Home — Our City" of Arkady Chernetsky.

After this defeat, Rossel decided to drop the very name "Transformation of Ural." He founded the "Unity of the Urals" bloc, later renamed "For the Native Ural." This organization practically ceased to exist in 2004, when governor Eduard Rossel joined the United Russia party, as well as the bloc's representatives in the legislative assembly did. Amendments to the federal law on political parties in the early 2000s forced regional parties in Russia to abandon their activity.

=== Federal level ===
Shortly before the elections to the 2nd State Duma in 1995, Eduard Rossel created the All-Russian public organization "Transformation of the Fatherland" on the basis of the "Transformation of Ural." On 28 September 1995 Transformation of the Fatherland formed the eponymous electoral bloc, allying with the Free Democratic Party of Russia (SvDPR) of Marina Salye and the All-Russian Party for Human Security (VPBCh) of Nikolay Arzhannikov. It did not overcome the 5% electoral threshold, receiving 339,654 votes (0.49%, 23rd place). Anatoly Kotkov, a member of the Democratic Party of Russia, was elected to the Duma from this bloc in Nizhny Tagil constituency.

== Symbols ==
The white-green-black flag, used by Transformation of Ural, was first raised in 1992 at the Mansi people's congress in Uray. Anton Bakov is considered the initiator of the use of this flag in the Ural Republic project, for which he was developing the constitution. Bakov denies that the tricolor was previously used by Mansi activists.

Another symbol of the movement was a golden figure of a bird. It was described either as an eagle or a pigeon, and was redrawn from one of the Kasli iron sculptures.
