= Denis Pasler =

Russian politician (born 1978)

- Денис Паслер
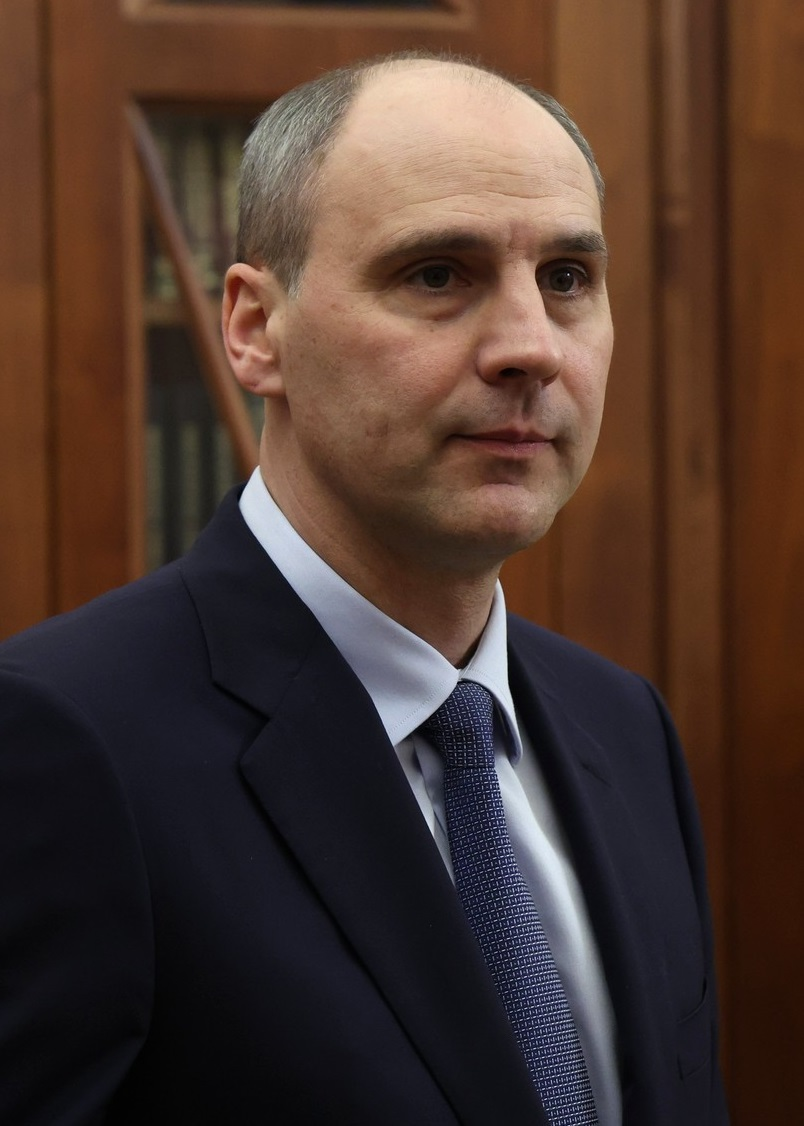
- Pasler in 2025

5th Governor of Sverdlovsk Oblast
- Incumbent
- Assumed office 16 September 2025; Acting: 26 March – 16 September 2025
- Preceded by: Yevgeny Kuyvashev

4th Governor of Orenburg Oblast
- In office 18 September 2019 – 26 March 2025
- Preceded by: Yury Berg
- Succeeded by: Yevgeny Solntsev

Chairman of the Government of the Sverdlovsk Oblast
- In office 19 June 2012 – 28 September 2016
- Governor: Yevgeny Kuyvashev
- Preceded by: Vladimir Vlasov
- Succeeded by: Office disestablished

Member of the House of Representatives of the Legislative Assembly of Sverdlovsk Oblast
- In office 2 March 2008 – 19 June 2012

Personal details
- Born: 29 October 1978 (age 47) Severouralsk, RSFSR Soviet Union
- Citizenship: Russia
- Party: United Russia
- Education: Ural State Mining University

Denis Vladimirovich Pasler (Russian: Денис Владимирович Паслер; born 29 October 1978) is a Russian politician who is currently the governor of Sverdlovsk Oblast since September 2025.

He previously served as the 4th Governor of Orenburg Oblast from 2019 to 2025 and the Chairman of the Government of Sverdlovsk Oblast from 2012 to 2016.

== Biography ==
Denis Pasler was born on 29 October 1978.

After graduating from the Ural State Mining University in 2001, Pasler began working at Severouralsky Concrete Concrete Plant CJSC as the head of the sales department, was the appointed commercial director of the enterprise. Soon he became the general director of Severouralsky Concrete Concrete Plant LLC, which he remained (concurrently) until his appointment as Chairman of the Government of the Sverdlovsk Region.

From 2004 to 2005, he headed OAO Krasnoturinskmezhraygaz. From 2005 to 2009, Pasler headed CJSC GAZEKS (GRO of the Sverdlovsk Oblast).

On 2 March 2008, Pasler was elected to the House of Representatives of the Legislative Assembly of Sverdlovsk Oblast from the Serov single-mandate constituency No. 19. From 2008 to 2011, he was a member of the House of Representatives of the Legislative Assembly of the Sverdlovsk Region from the Serov constituency. In May 2009, he was elected to the Regional Political Council of the United Russia Party, in May 2011 - to the Presidium of the Party's Political Council.

From 2009 to 2010, he was managing director of OAO Sverdlovenergosbyt, and from 25 December 2010 to 2012, he held the position of General Director of OAO Yekaterinburggaz.

From December 2011 to June 2012, he was a member of the Legislative Assembly of Sverdlovsk Oblast, and was a member of the Committee for Infrastructure Development and Housing Policy.

On 19 June 2012, Pasler was nominated and approved for the post of Chairman of the Government of the Sverdlovsk Oblast. On 20 June, in accordance with the decree of the governor, he took up his duties. On 26 September 2016, he resigned of his own accord.

Since 10 March 2017, he has been acting as the General Director of PJSC T Plus, and since 4 April 2017, he has been the chairman of the Board of PJSC T Plus.

=== Acting Governor of Orenburg Oblast ===
On 21 March 2019, Vladimir Putin appointed Pasler the Acting Governor of Orenburg Oblast to replace the resigned Yury Berg.

On 29 April, Pasler's candidacy was proposed at the primaries of United Russia to participate in the election of the governor of the Orenburg Oblast. Pasler won the United Russia primaries. He was supported at the regional conference on 1 June 2019 by 141 delegates out of 153 who took part in the conference.

=== Governor of Orenburg ===
On the Single Voting Day, on 9 September 2019, with a score of 65.93% in the first round of elections for the Governor of the Orenburg Oblast, Pasler won the election. His term will end in 2024.

Since 21 December 2020, he is a member of the Presidium of the State Council of Russia.

=== Governor of Sverdlovsk ===
On 26 March 2025, Pasler was appointed as acting governor of Sverdlovsk Oblast.

=== Sanctions ===
He was sanctioned by the UK government in 2022 in relation to the Russo-Ukrainian War.

== Personal life ==
=== Family ===
His father, Vladimir Yemilievich, was a major entrepreneur in the city of Severouralsk, the owner of the transport business. He died in June 2017.

In an interview with RIA Novosti, Pasler said that his father worked as a loader driver, being at two jobs, and his mother worked in the city sports committee. He stated that he himself began to work very early, at the age of 14 he unloaded wagons with friends.

His brother, Vladimir, was formerly a member of the Severouralsk City Duma and was the commercial director of Severouralsky Concrete Concrete Plant LLC, and now vice-mayor of Severouralsk.

His younger brother, Ivan, has been working in the gas industry for many years. As of August 2020, he held the positions of Deputy General Director and Chief Engineer of Ekaterinburggaz JSC.

His first wife, Larisa Pasler, was a former athlete, played for the Uralochka volleyball club. In the first marriage, he had two sons, Mikhail and Denis. The couple separated in 2013, and the children live with their mother.

The current wife, Yelena Gertz, has a medical education, worked as a cosmetologist, and now is a media manager, editor and publisher. The couple has three children: Yelena's son and daughter from her first marriage and a joint young son.

=== Hobbies ===
He is fond of sports, patronizes the adult and children's football teams of the city of Kamensk-Uralsky. Previously, he was a member of the board of directors of the Ural football club. He actively plays football and is engaged in sports swimming.

On 12 April 2019, he took part in the Space Run, a mass long-distance running competition held in Orenburg and dedicated to Cosmonautics Day.
