= Demyanov =

Demyanov (Демьянов) is a Russian patronymic surname (from Демьян, Damian). Notable people with the surname include:

- Mikhail Demyanov (1873–1913), Russian painter
- Nikolay Demyanov (1861–1938), Russian chemist
- Viktor Demyanov (born 1999), Russian footballer

== See also ==
- Demyanyuk, a Ukrainian cognate
