= Nikolay Ezersky =

Russian politician (born 1956)

Nikolay Ezersky MP
- Николай Езерский
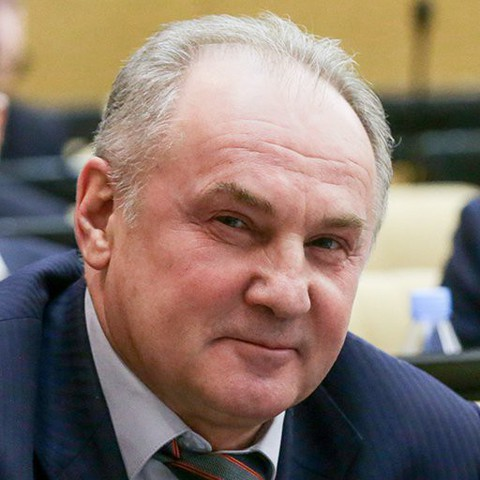

Member of the State Duma (Party List Seat)
- Incumbent
- Assumed office 29 December 2003

Personal details
- Born: 8 May 1956 (age 70) Palmino, Taborinsky District, Sverdlovsk Oblast, Russian SFSR, USSR
- Party: Communist Party of the Russian Federation
- Education: Ural Forest Institute; Ural Socio-Political Institute

Nikolay Nikolaevich Ezersky (Russian: Николай Николаевич Езерский; born 8 May 1956, Palmino, Taborinsky District) is a Russian political figure, FSB lieutenant colonel, and a deputy of the 4th, 5th, 6th, 7th, and 8th State Dumas.

== Biography and education ==
Ezersky was born on May 8, 1956 in Taborinsky District of Sverdlovsk Oblast.

In 1978 he graduated from the Faculty of Forestry Engineering (Process Engineer). In 1988 he graduated from the Ural Socio-Political Institute.

== Political career ==
From 1980 to 1991, he was a member of the Communist Party of the Soviet Union. From 1982 to 1984, he served in the Soviet Army. In 1986, he was among the Chernobyl liquidators. From 2000 to 2003, he was the deputy of the Regional Duma of the Legislative Assembly of Sverdlovsk Oblast. In 2003, he was elected deputy of the 4th State Duma from the Ural Federal District constituency. In 2007, 2011, 2016, and 2021, he was re-elected for the 4th, 5th, 6th, 7th, and 8th State Dumas, respectively.

== Legislative Activities ==
From 2003 to 2019, during his tenure as a deputy of the State Duma of the 4th, 5th, 6th, and 7th convocations, he co-authored 64 legislative initiatives and amendments to draft federal laws.

== Awards and honours ==
In 1995 he was awarded the Medal of the Order "For Merit to the Fatherland" of II class.

In 1999 he became the Honored Builder of Russia.

== Sanctions ==
He was sanctioned by the UK government in 2022 in relation to the Russo-Ukrainian War.
