= Innoprom =

Industrial exhibition

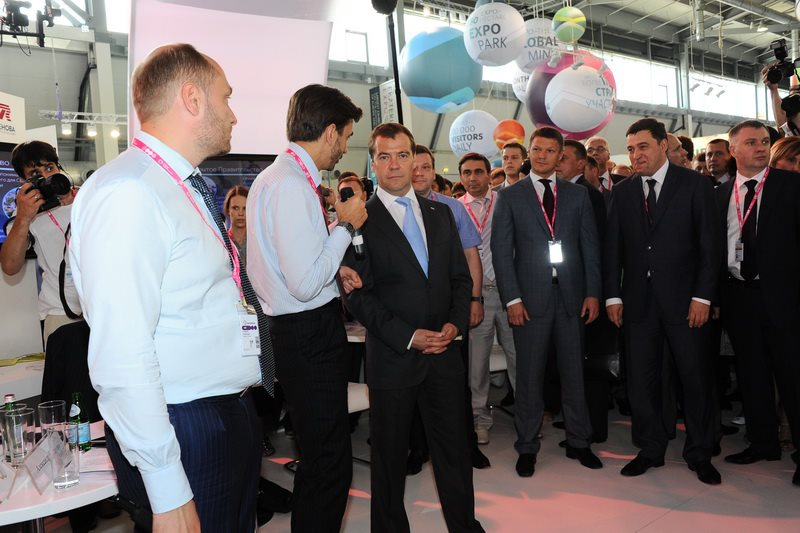
Dmitry Medvedev at Innoprom-2012

Innoprom is a large-scale international industrial exhibition annually held in Ekaterinburg, Russia. As declared, "the purpose of the Exhibition is to present advanced technologies developed in Russia which are ready to be used in industry, to facilitate the spreading of the best innovation practices and developing business connections between industrial enterprises and technology developers."

The first exhibit took part in July 2010 and the third one takes part in July 2012. For the second one, the Ekaterinburg-Expo exhibition and congress center was constructed, one of the largest in Russia. The purpose of the center is to hold future exhibitions of various scale, and Sverdlovsk Oblast authorities aim to make it a place to hold Expo 2020 World Fair. Unfortunately, the Ekaterinburg-Expo construction project ran over the budget dramatically, thus approximately half of the construction was abandoned. Innoprom 2011 was held in completed parts of the complex, abandoned parts being screened with posters and fences.

Representatives of about 30 countries, including commercial enterprises and governmental institutions, attend the expo. Among the key participating companies are Siemens, Sberbank, VSMPO-AVISMA, Rosneft and others. Top Russian officials such as Vladimir Putin and Dmitry Medvedev address the conference. Sverdlovsk Oblast governor Alexander Misharin is one of the key organizers.
