= Dyomkin =

Dyomkin, feminine: Dyomkina, Russian: Дёмкин, Дёмкина, sometimes transliterated as Demkin, Demkina is a Russian patronymic surname derived from the given name Dyomka, a diminutive of Demyan. Notable people with the surname include:

- Andrei Dyomkin (born 1976), Russian footballer
- Natasha Demkina (born 1987), Russian woman who claimed to have extrasensory abilities

== See also ==
- Dyomin
