= Viktor Sheptiy =

Russian politician (born 1965)

- Виктор Шептий
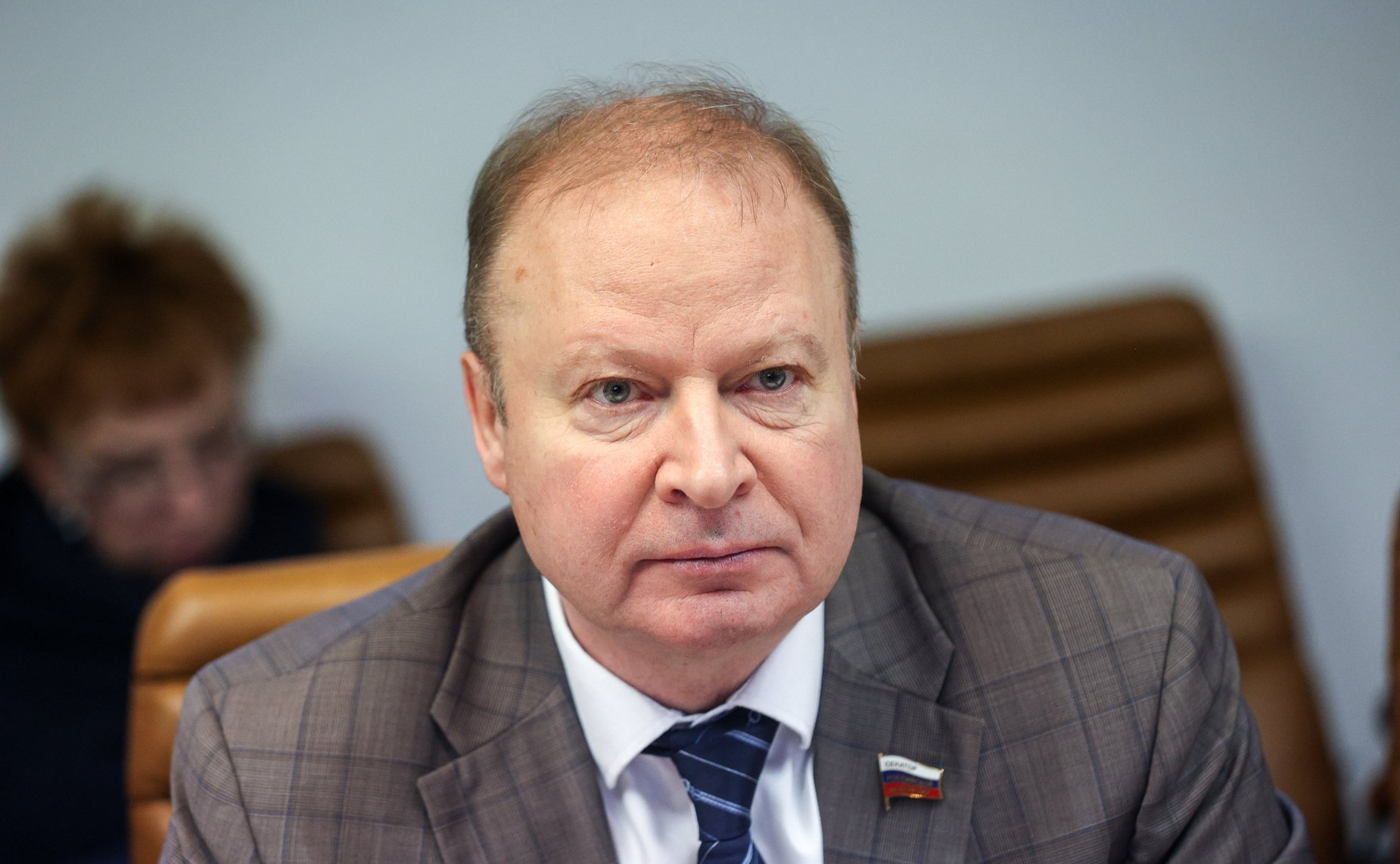

Senator from Sverdlovsk Oblast
- Incumbent
- Assumed office 20 September 2022
- Preceded by: Eduard Rossel

Personal details
- Born: Viktor Sheptiy; 25 December 1965 (age 60) Yekaterinburg, Russian Soviet Federative Socialist Republic, Soviet Union
- Party: United Russia
- Education: Novosibirsk Higher Military Command School, Ural State Law University

Viktor Anatolyevich Sheptiy (Russian: Виктор Анатольевич Шептий; born 25 December 1965) is a Russian politician, serving as a senator from Sverdlovsk Oblast since 20 September 2022.

== Career ==
Viktor Sheptiy was born on 25 December 1965 in Sverdlovsk. In 1989, he graduated from the Novosibirsk Higher Military Command School. From 1993, he worked in the Alpha Group, Federal Security Service Special Purpose Center. At the beginning of 2000s, he became the head of it. From 2004 to 2022, he was the deputy of the Legislative Assembly of Sverdlovsk Oblast. On 20 September 2022, he became the senator from Sverdlovsk Oblast.

=== Sanctions ===
Viktor Sheptiy is under personal sanctions introduced by the European Union, the United Kingdom, the United States, Canada, Switzerland, Australia, Ukraine, New Zealand, for ratifying the decisions of the "Treaty of Friendship, Cooperation and Mutual Assistance between the Russian Federation and the Donetsk People's Republic and between the Russian Federation and the Luhansk People's Republic" and providing political and economic support for Russia's annexation of Ukrainian territories.
