= Vyacheslav Dyomin =

Russian footballer

Personal information
- Full name: Vyacheslav Vitalyevich Dyomin
- Date of birth: 5 September 1968 (age 58)
- Place of birth: Pskov, Russian SFSR
- Height: 1.82 m (5 ft 11 1/2 in)
- Position: Midfielder

Youth career
- FC Mashinostroitel Pskov

Senior career*
Years	Team	Apps	(Gls)
1988–1991	FC Mashinostroitel Pskov	34	(6)
1991	FC Spartak Bryansk (amateur)		
1992	RAF Jelgava	2	(0)
1992	FC Mashinostroitel Pskov	21	(5)
1992	FC Zenit Saint Petersburg	10	(0)
1993	FC KAMAZ Naberezhnye Chelny	3	(0)
1993–1994	FC Tekstilshchik Kamyshin	7	(0)
1995	FC Shinnik Yaroslavl	11	(0)
1995	FC Saturn Ramenskoye	15	(3)
1996–1997	FC Spartak Bryansk	36	(12)
1997	FC Mashinostroitel Pskov	7	(0)
1998	FC Pskov	14	(1)
1999	FC Dynamo Vologda	4	(0)
2000	FC Spartak Kostroma	3	(1)
2005	FC Garant-Sport Velikiy Novgorod		
- * Club domestic league appearances and goals

Vyacheslav Vitalyevich Dyomin (Russian: Вячеслав Витальевич Дёмин; born 5 September 1968 in Pskov) is a former Russian football player.
