= Demyanyuk =

Demyanyuk, Dem'yanyuk or Demjanjuk (Ukrainian: Дем'янюк) is a patronymic surname of Ukrainian origin, meaning "child of Demyan". Notable people with the surname include:

- Dmytro Dem'yanyuk (born 1983), Ukrainian high jumper
- John Demjanjuk (1920–2012), Ukrainian-American Nazi concentration camp guard
- Oleksiy Demyanyuk (1958–1999), Soviet high jumper
