= Arkady Chernetsky =

Russian politician (born 1950)

- Аркадий Чернецкий
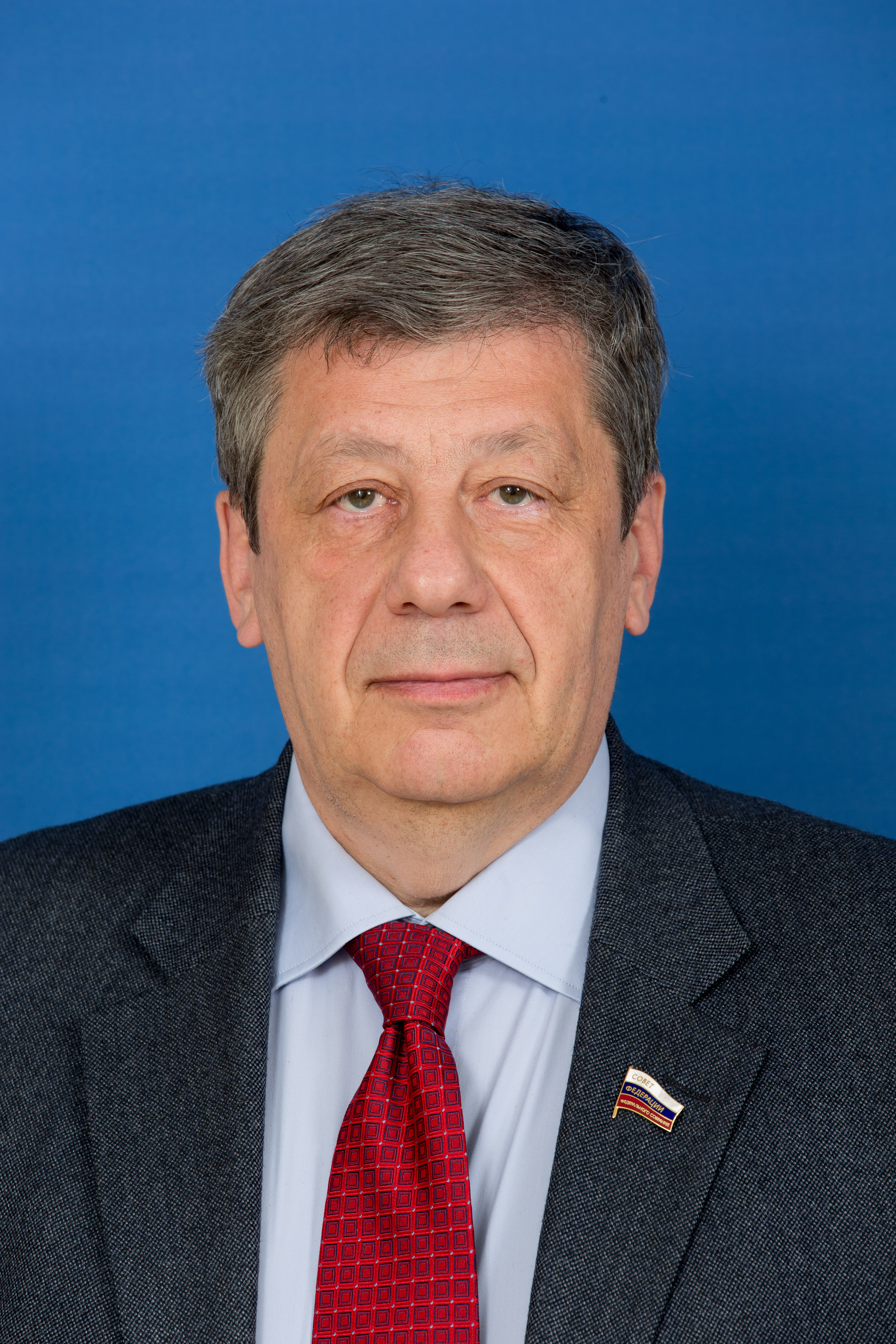

First Deputy Chairman of the Legislative Assembly of Sverdlovsk Oblast
- Incumbent
- Assumed office 8 October 2021

Russian Federation Senator from Sverdlovsk Oblast
- In office 27 October 2010 – 8 October 2021
- Preceded by: Yury Osintsev
- Succeeded by: Alexander Vysokinsky

Mayor of Yekaterinburg
- In office 30 January 1992 – 2 November 2010
- Preceded by: Office established
- Succeeded by: Yevgeny Porunov

Personal details
- Born: 8 May 1950 (age 75) Nizhny Tagil, Sverdlovsk Oblast, RSFSR, Soviet Union
- Political party: United Russia

Arkady Mikhaylovich Chernetsky (Russian: Арка́дий Миха́йлович Черне́цкий; born May 8, 1950) is a Russian politician who served as Mayor of Yekaterinburg, Sverdlovsk Oblast, Russia from January 1992 to November 2, 2010.

== Early life ==
Arkady Mikhailovich Chernetsky was born on May 8, 1950, in Nizhny Tagil to an engineer (his father) and a surgeon (his mother). In 1972, he graduated from the metallurgical department of the Ural Polytechnic Institute.

From 1972 to 1974 Chernetsky served as a tank platoon commander in the Soviet army. He was stationed in the Turkmenia Military District. He completed his term of service as a colonel. After leaving the army, he began working at a factory where he remained for over ten years.

Chernetsky achieved a number of Soviet government awards.

== Biography ==
Arkady Chernetsky was born on May 8, 1950, in Nizhny Tagil. His father, Mikhail Mikhailovich Chernetsky (1919–?), was an engineer; his mother, Eleonora Borisovna Chernetskaya (1925–2021), was a surgeon. His father had been evacuated from Kharkiv to Nizhny Tagil along with Factory No. 183 to work at Uralvagonzavod.

In 1967, he graduated from Secondary School No. 9 in Nizhny Tagil with a silver medal. In 1972, he graduated from the Metallurgical Faculty of the Ural Polytechnic Institute named after S. M. Kirov (UPI) with a degree in metallurgical engineering.

From 1972 to 1974, he served in the Turkestan Military District with the rank of lieutenant, as a platoon commander. He currently holds the rank of reserve colonel.

From 1974 to 1987, he worked at various positions (ultimately as Deputy Director for Production) at the Uraltransmash plant; from 1987 to 1992, he served as General Director of the Uralhimmash plant.

From 1994 to 1996, he was a deputy of the Sverdlovsk Regional Duma. From 1996 to 2004, he served as a deputy of the Chamber of Representatives of the Legislative Assembly of Sverdlovsk Oblast, and from 1998 to 2004, he chaired the Committee on Legislation and Local Self-Government within that chamber.

He has served as President of the Union of Russian Cities (since 2001), Vice President of the Congress of Local Authorities of the Russian Federation, and President of the Ural-Siberian UNESCO Center.

== Other achievements ==
- Orders of Russian Orthodox Church: Order of Prince Daniel 3rd class and Order of St. Sergius of Radonezh 3rd class
- Russian Mayor of 1995
- Honored Industrial Engineer of the Russian Federation (awarded in 1997)
- Honored Citizen of Yekaterinburg (awarded in August 1999)
- Order of Honour (awarded in 2000)
- Order of Friendship (2015)
- Honored Citizen of Sverdlovsk Oblast (2020)
- Order of Alexander Nevsky (2021)
