= Alexander Misharin =

Russian politician (born 1959)

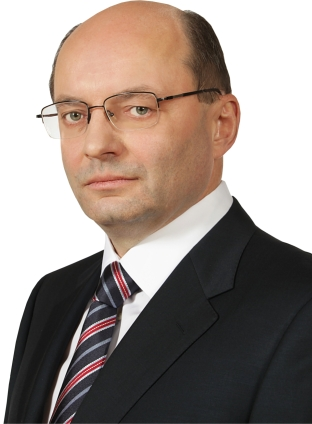
Alexander Misharin

Alexander Sergeevich Misharin (born January 21, 1959, in Sverdlovsk, USSR) is the former governor of Sverdlovsk Oblast, a region in Russia. He was appointed in 2009 after resignation of the previous governor, Eduard Rossel and resigned on May 14, 2012. Prior to his governorship, he made a career in the railway industry, rising to Russia's Deputy Railway Minister. He was appointed first vice-president of Russian Railways and head of Skorostniye Magistrali, the Russian high-speed rail developer and operator on November 28, 2012.

== Early life and education ==
Alexander Misharin was born in Sverdlovsk in the family of railway employees. He went to school in the town of Artyomovsky, Sverdlovsk Oblast and graduated from the Ural State University of Railway Transport in 1981. He obtained his second university degree in economics from the same university in 1997 and defended a PhD thesis in railway computerization efficiency in 1999 for a degree in economics. Misharin defended a Doctoral thesis in engineering in 2005.

== Career ==
Misharin started his career at Sverdlovsk Railway Company in 1981 (until 1989) and was involved in construction of the metropolitan subway train system in Sverdlovsk from 1989 to 1991 as a senior engineer for electrical systems. After the launch of the subway in April 1991, Misharin went back to work for the Sverdlovsk Railway as head of electricity supply and was promoted to chief engineer in 1996.

He was appointed Russian deputy railway minister in 1998, a position he held through June 2004, subsequently becoming Russia's deputy transport minister until March 2009. Misharin sat on the board of directors of Russian Railways, the government-controlled railway, between 2005 and 2008. In 2008, he was serving as the chairman of the board of KrasAir. In March 2009, he was moved to head the Industry and Infrastructure Department of the Russian government.

In May 2012, Misharin resigned as a provincial governor. In January 2013, he was appointed senior VP of Russian Railways and CEO of High Speed Railways, the railway monopoly's subsidiary.

== Political career ==
Misharin became a member of the United Russia political party, rising to membership in the party's General Council. Russian President Dmitry Medvedev nominated Misharin as candidate for Governor of Sverdlovsk Region position, and the regional Duma (legislature) confirmed his nomination, making him regional governor on November 17, 2009.

As regional governor, Misharin was involved in the creation of so-called Titanium Valley, a special economic zone and industrial park that will make products for the aircraft, automotive, shipbuilding and medical industries. He proposed construction of a high-speed railway connecting Moscow and Yekaterinburg and another between Yekaterinburg and Nizhniy Tagil, an industrial city about 150 km (100 miles) apart.

Misharin established and developed long-term international relationships related to commerce, investment, and culture; for example, he developed a strategical contact with American Chamber of Commerce in Russia, and the leading economic partner of the Oblast is Germany. In December 2011 Standard & Poor's credit rating service promoted the Sverdlovsk region's long-term rating from BB to BB+ with a stable outlook.

Misharin ordered construction of the Ekaterinburg-Expo exhibition center to hold the second Innoprom exhibition. The project ran over budget, and half of the construction was abandoned. Innoprom 2011 was held in the completed part of the complex.

After Russia’s bid to host the 2018 FIFA World Cup won, Misharin promoted Yekaterinburg as a host city for elimination-round games and FIFA granted the city host status in September 2012.

Misharin's resignation address (in Russian)

He overturned the membership of his administration twice while he was governor, and also attempted to combine the two legislative houses into one.

Misharin resigned on May 14, 2012.

== Awards and medals ==
- Medal of the Order for the Service for the Motherland, 2nd class
- Stolypin Medal. 2nd Class (November 2009) for addressing strategic challenges to develop the nation’s manufacturing potential and long years of dedicated work
