= Dyoma =

Dyoma Дёма
- Village
- Location within Perm Krai Location within Russia
- Coordinates: 59°39′N 54°02′E
- Country: Russia
- Region: Perm Krai
- District: Kochyovsky District
- Time zone: UTC+5:00

Dyoma (Russian: Дёма) is a rural locality (a village) in Kochyovskoye Rural Settlement, Kochyovsky District, Perm Krai, Russia. The population was 17 as of 2010. The village has 3 streets.

== Geography ==
Dyoma is located 20 km northwest of Kochyovo (the district's administrative centre) by road. Vorobyovo is the nearest rural locality.
