= Demyanenko =

Demyanenko (Ukrainian: Дем'яненко) is a surname of Ukrainian origin. It originates from the name Demyan (Ukrainian: Дем'ян) through an addition of the Ukrainian paternal suffix -enko. Notable people with the surname include:

- Aleksandr Demyanenko (1937–1999), Russian film and theater actor
- Anatoliy Demyanenko (born 1957), Ukrainian football player and coach
- Andrey Demyanenko (born 1984), Belarusian rower
- Danny Demyanenko (born 1994), Canadian volleyball player
- Denys Demyanenko (born 2000), Ukrainian football player
- Ivan Demyanenko (born 1989), Uzbek swimmer
- Olena Demyanenko (born 1966), Ukrainian film director, film producer, screenwriter
- Valentin Demyanenko (born 1983), Ukrainian–Azerbaijani flatwater canoeist
- Viktor Demyanenko (born 1958), Kazakhstani boxer
