= Ural State Mining University =

Public university in Yekaterinburg, Russia

Coordinates: 56°49′34″N 60°35′45″E

- Ykaterinburg Institute of Mines; Екатеринбургский горный институт
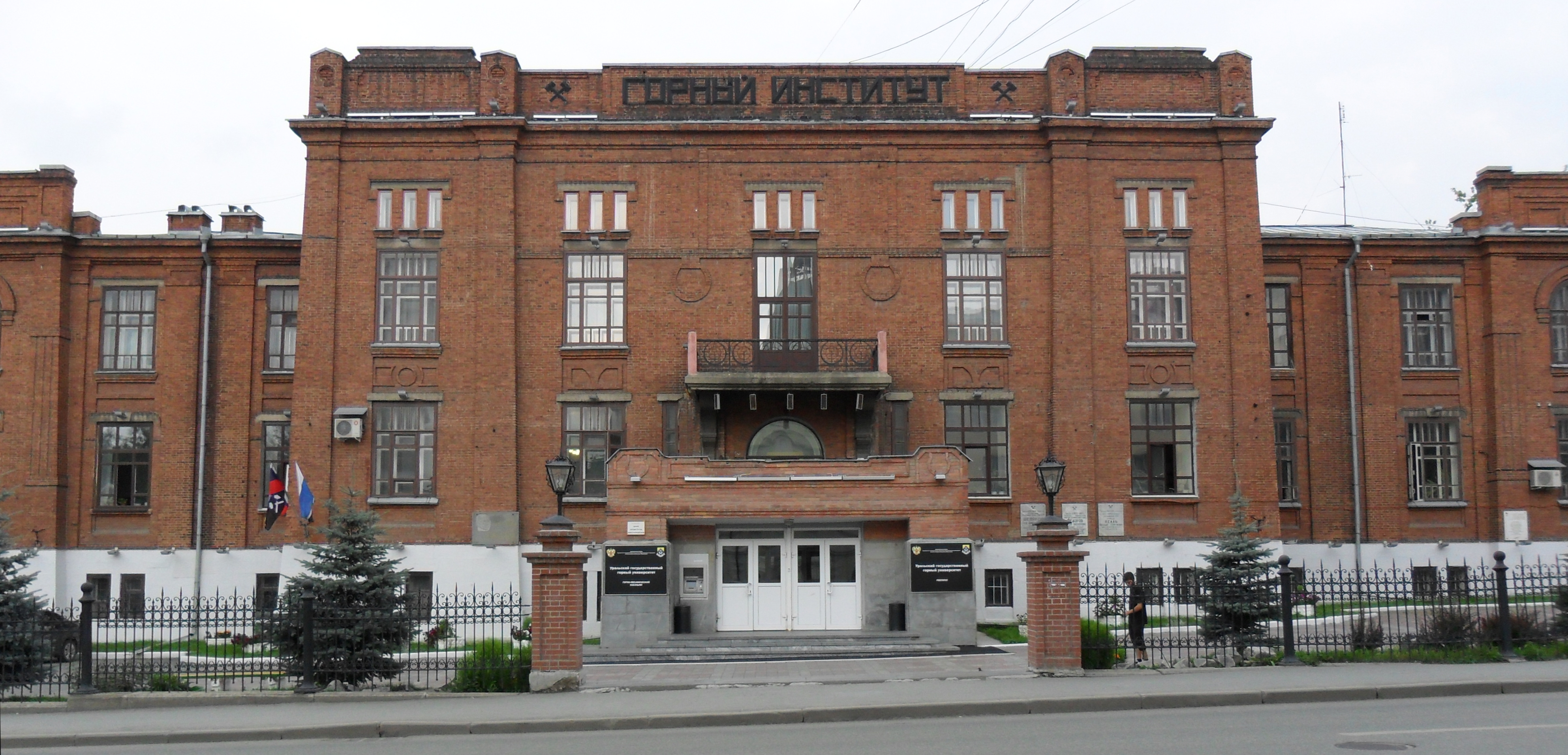
- Motto: О горнем помышляйте Dream of the celectial
- Type: University/Engineering school
- Established: 3 July 1914
- Rector: Prof. Nikolay Kosarev
- Faculty: 208
- Location: Yekaterinburg, Russia
- Campus: Urban
- Website: http://www.ursmu.ru/

Ural State Mining University (Russian: Уральский государственный горный университет) is situated in Yekaterinburg, Russian Federation. It was founded in 1914. In 1917 Nicholas II signed an order titled "On keeping of the Yekaterinburg Institute of Mines under the patronage of His Majesty the Emperor and on giving to this educational establishment the title of The Emperor Nicholas II Ural Institute of Mines".

It is the oldest establishment of higher education in the Middle Urals. It offers education in geology, geophysics, engineering and management of mining, geological prospecting. The university offers dozens of graduate and postgraduate programmes. The geologists of the university have discovered hundreds of deposits in Urals and Siberia.

== Ural Geological Museum ==
The university has a famous museum of minerals founded in 1937 and considered to be one of the greatest public collections of its kind in Europe. The university is also known for its efforts in the maintenance of religious traditions in higher education in Russia and for its chairing of sports and physical culture.

== Alumni ==
- Eduard Rossel - Governor of the Sverdlovsk Oblast
- Boris Ryzhy - Poet
- Yury Prilukov - twice world champion in swimming
- Aleksandr Motylev - champion of Russia in chess
- Alexei Kovyazin - four times Olympic champion in biathlon
- Yekaterina Ivaschenko - rock-climber, world champion
