= Stolypin Medal =

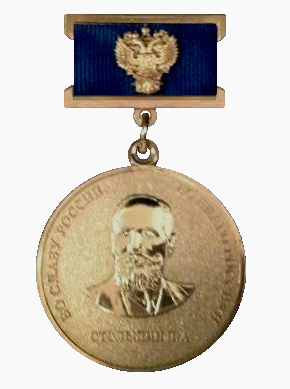
- First Class Stolypin Medal
- Type: Two grade medal
- Awarded for: Achievements in addressing strategic socioeconomic development objectives
- Presented by: Russian Federation
- Eligibility: Russian citizens
- Status: Active
- Established: 26 May 2008
- First award: 8 February 2009
- Ribbon of the medal 1st class Ribbon of the medal 2nd class

The P. A. Stolypin Medal (Russian: Медаль Столыпина П. А., romanized: Medal Stolypina P. A.) is an award of the Government of the Russian Federation. It was established on 26 May 2008 by Decree No. 388 of the Government of the Russian Federation, "On the P.A. Stolypin Medal." The medal is awarded in two classes, the first and the second.

== Statute of the medal ==
The medal is awarded for "achievements in addressing strategic socioeconomic development objectives, including the implementation of long-term projects of the Government of the Russian Federation in industry, agriculture, construction, transport, science, education, healthcare, culture, and other areas." Eligible individuals must have at least 10 years of public service or at least 15 years of professional experience. It is named for Pyotr Stolypin, Chairman of the Council of Ministers between 1906 and 1911.

The regulations were amended on 25 December 2019; establishing that the first-class medal could be awarded to recipients who had not previously received the second-class medal. They were again amended on 30 June 2020; establishing that nominations for the medal are submitted by government ministers, heads of federal government agencies, and senior officials of the federal subjects of Russia, and to allow its award to citizens who have received government letters of commendation and honorary diplomas. The medal is awarded by the Prime Minister of Russia, or by other high-ranking officials as they direct.

== Description ==
The Stolypin Medal is 34mm in diameter and made of brass, the first-class medal is gold-plated, the second-class medal is silver-plated. The obverse features a relief bust of Pyotr Stolypin, with the raised inscription "FOR THE GLORY OF RUSSIA, FOR THE BENEFIT OF RUSSIANS", (Russian: ВО СЛАВУ РОССИИ, ВО БЛАГО РОССИЯН, romanized: VO SLAVU ROSSII, VO BLAGO ROSSIYAN) along the upper edge, and "STOLYPIN P.A." (Russian: СТОЛЫПИН П.А.) along the lower edge. The reverse features the raised inscription "GOVERNMENT OF THE RUSSIAN FEDERATION" (Russian: ПРАВИТЕЛЬСТВО РОССИЙСКОЙ ФЕДЕРАЦИИ, romanized: PRAVITELSTVO ROSSIYSKOY FEDERATSII) and the number of the award. The medal is attached with a loop and ring to a rectangular medal bar, covered with a blue silk moiré ribbon. Attached to the medal bar is an image of a double-headed eagle holding crossed scepters in its claws.

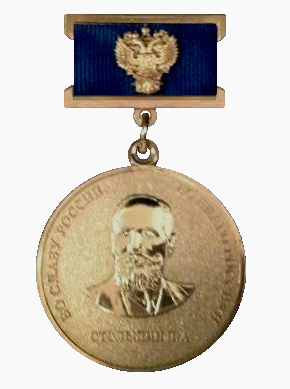
Medal I class

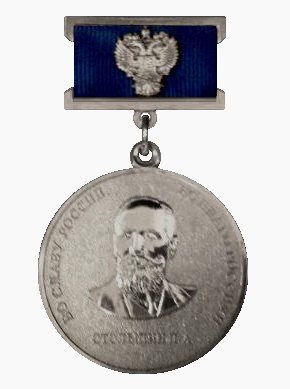
Medal II class

== History ==
The second-class medal was first awarded to German Gref, president of Sberbank, on 8 February 2009. Gref had previously been Minister of Economic Development and Trade. The first-class medal was first awarded to Alexey Gordeyev, Minister of Agriculture, on 5 March 2009.
