= Dyoma, Chishminsky District, Republic of Bashkortostan =

Dyoma Дёма
- Village
- Location within Bashkortostan Location within Russia
- Coordinates: 54°35′N 55°40′E
- Country: Russia
- Region: Bashkortostan
- District: Chishminsky District
- Time zone: UTC+5:00

Dyoma (Russian: Дёма; Bashkir: Дим, Dim) is a rural locality (a village) in Arovsky Selsoviet, Chishminsky District, Bashkortostan, Russia. The village has 23 streets and, as of 2010, a population of 77.

== Geography ==
Dyoma lies 27 km east of Chishmy, the district's administrative seat. Lekarevka is the nearest rural locality.
