= Governor of Sverdlovsk Oblast =

Highest-ranking official in Sverdlovsk Oblast, Russia

- Coat of arms of Sverdlovsk Oblast

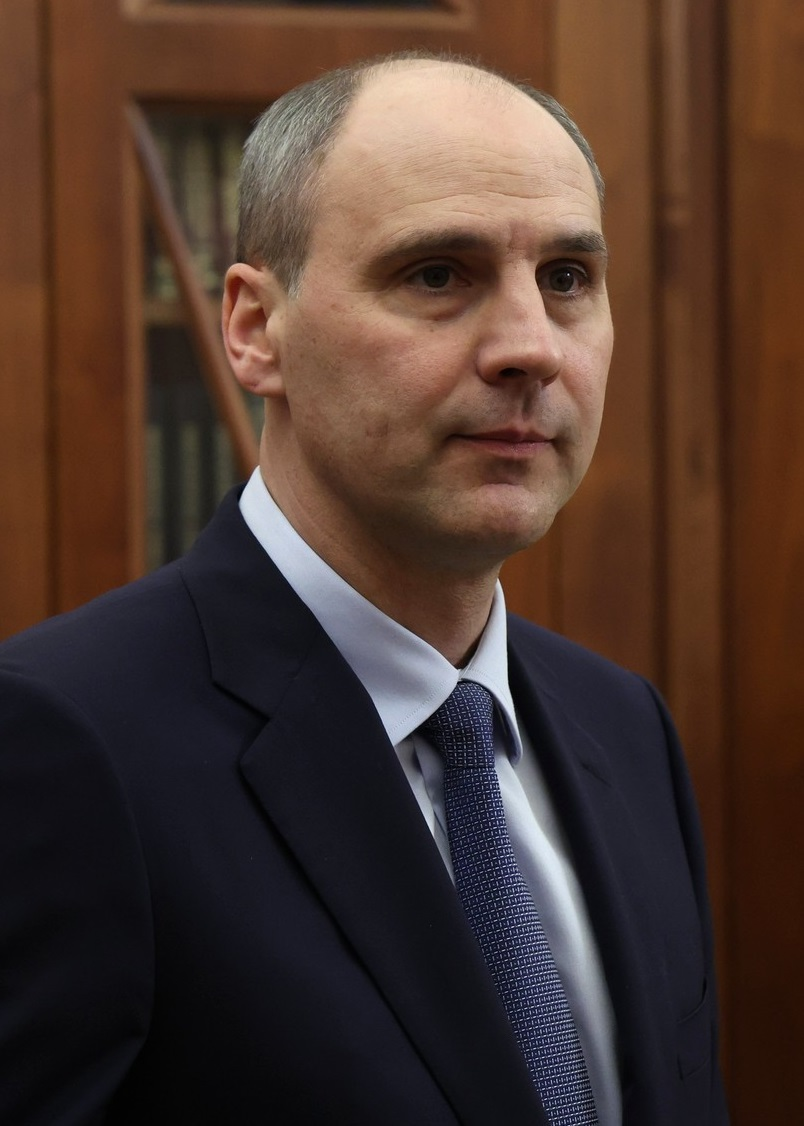
- Incumbent; Denis Pasler since 16 September 2025
- Residence: Tarasov Estate, Yekaterinburg
- Nominator: Political parties
- Term length: 5 years
- Inaugural holder: Eduard Rossel
- Formation: 1991
- Website: gubernator96.ru

The governor of Sverdlovsk Oblast (Russian: Губернатор Свердловской области) is the highest official of Sverdlovsk Oblast, a region of Russia. He heads the government of Sverdlovsk Oblast and is elected by direct popular vote for the term of five years.

== History of office ==
On 16 October 1991, chairman of executive committee of Sverdlovsk Oblast Eduard Rossel was appointed Head of Administration of the region. Rossel pursued a policy aimed at obtaining the economic and legislative independence from the federal Center. The leadership of Sverdlovsk Oblast put forward the idea of transforming the region into an autonomous republic. President of Russia Boris Yeltsin initially announced his support for the Ural Republic, but on 9 November 1993, a presidential decree was issued on the dissolution of the Sverdlovsk Regional Council, and on the next day Eduard Rossel himself was sacked.

In 1995 election, Rossel surpassed Alexey Strakhov, and he took office as governor. He reigned for the next 14 years. In 2009, president Dmitry Medvedev appointed deputy minister of transport Alexander Misharin as the new head of the region. Three years later he was succeeded by Yevgeny Kuyvashev. In 2016 the separate office of the Chairman of the Government of Sverdlovsk Oblast was abolished.

== List of officeholders ==
| No. | Portrait | Governor | Tenure | Time in office | Party | Election |
|---|---|---|---|---|---|---|
| 1 | | Eduard Rossel (born 1937) | 16 October 1991 – 10 November 1993 (removed) | 2 years, 25 days | Independent | Appointed |
| – | | Valery Trushnikov (1950–2008) | 10 November 1993 – 6 January 1994 | 57 days | Independent | Acting |
| 2 | | Aleksey Strakhov (born 1942) | 6 January 1994 – 23 August 1995 (lost election) | 1 year, 229 days | Independent | Appointed |
| (1) | | Eduard Rossel (born 1937) | 23 August 1995 – 23 November 2009 (was not renominated) | 14 years, 92 days | Transformation of Ural → United Russia | 1995; 1999; 2003; 2005 |
| 3 | | Alexander Misharin (born 1959) | 23 November 2009 – 14 May 2012 (resigned) | 2 years, 173 days | United Russia | 2009 |
| – | | Anatoly Gredin (born 1956) | 10 December 2011 – 6 February 2012 | 58 days | United Russia | Acting for Misharin |
| – | | Yevgeny Kuyvashev (born 1971) | 14 May 2012 – 29 May 2012 | 12 years, 316 days | United Russia | Acting |
| 4 | | Yevgeny Kuyvashev (born 1971) | 29 May 2012 – 17 April 2017 (resigned) | 12 years, 316 days | United Russia | 2012 |
| – | | Yevgeny Kuyvashev (born 1971) | 17 April 2017 – 18 September 2017 | 12 years, 316 days | United Russia | Acting |
| (4) | | Yevgeny Kuyvashev (born 1971) | 18 September 2017 – 26 March 2025 (resigned) | 12 years, 316 days | United Russia | 2017; 2022 |
| – | | Denis Pasler (born 1978) | 26 March 2025 – 16 September 2025 | 1 year, 165 days | United Russia | Acting |
| 5 | | Denis Pasler (born 1978) | 16 September 2025 – present | 1 year, 165 days | United Russia | 2025 |
