= Eduard Rossel =

Russian politician (born 1937)

- Эдуард Россель
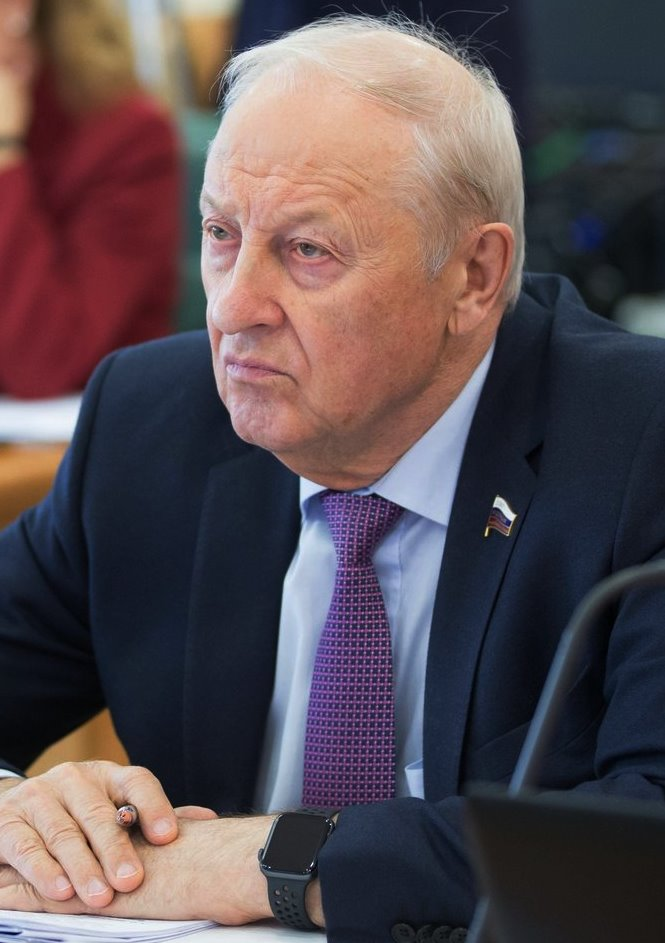
- Rossel in 2018

Senator from Sverdlovsk Oblast
- In office 16 December 2009 – 20 September 2022
- Preceded by: Aleksandr Shkolnik
- Succeeded by: Viktor Sheptiy

Governor of Sverdlovsk Oblast
- In office 25 August 1995 – 23 November 2009
- Preceded by: Aleksey Strakhov
- Succeeded by: Alexander Misharin

Chairman of Sverdlovsk Oblast Duma
- In office 29 April 1994 – 25 August 1995
- Preceded by: Position established
- Succeeded by: Vyacheslav Surganov

Head of Sverdlovsk Oblast Administration
- In office 16 October 1991 – 10 November 1993
- Preceded by: Position established
- Succeeded by: Aleksey Strakhov

Personal details
- Born: 8 October 1937 (age 88) Bor, Gorky Oblast, RSFSR, Soviet Union
- Party: United Russia (2004–)
- Other political affiliations: Transformation of Ural (1993–2004); CPSU (1966–1991)
- Education: Ural State Mining University
- Awards

Eduard Ergartovich Rossel (Russian: Эдуард Эргартович Россель; born 8 October 1937) is a Russian politician who served as Governor of Sverdlovsk Oblast from 1995 to 2009 and, from 2009 to 2022, as a member of the Federation Council.

== Childhood and war ==
Eduard Rossel was born in Bor, Nizhny Novgorod Oblast to Volga German parents. His father was executed by the NKVD in 1938 and he was left living with his mother, who at that time found a Ukrainian man and married him instead. Rossel's original language was German, but due to his mother's marriage to a Soviet national, he began to primarily speak Russian at home instead.

In 1962, Rossel graduated from the Ural State Mining University. He also holds a PhD in Technical Sciences and a doctoral degree in Economics and is an academician of the Russian Academy of Engineering and of the International Academy of Regional Cooperation and Development.

== Career ==
Prior to his career, Eduard Rossel made up his mind that he should never skip a single promotion. Prior to his political career, he was the head of the Sreduralstroy, an Ural based company. In 1974, Rossel met Boris Yeltsin (who in 1991 was elected as the first President of Russia after the collapse of the Soviet Union) at the metallurgy factory, Blooming-1500. During that time, Rossel already worked as head engineer of the Tagilstroy Trust, which was under the control of Alexei Kosygin.

In 1978, Eduard Rossel declined promotion from Boris Yeltsin, who wanted him to become a mayor of Nizhny Tagil. A few days after his election as mayor, Rossel got a visit from Alexander Avdonin, a geologist and local historian, who back then discovered, along with Geliy Ryabov, the burial site of the Romanov Dynasty.

He served as a governor of the Sverdlovsk Oblast from 1991 to 2009.

Rossel supported Boris Yeltsin during his rise to power. Yeltsin and Rossel became more hostile for a time due to Rossel's demand that Sverdlovsk Oblast have a status equal to that of Russia's republics. Rossel eventually returned to Yeltsin's favor, and in January 1996 Rossel won passage of a special bilateral agreement between Moscow and Sverdlovsk.

In 2005, Eduard Rossel awarded his successor, Alexey Vorobyov, the Order of Merit for the Fatherland, 3rd class.

In 2005 Eduard Rossel authored a book entitled A Regional Perspective on the Current and Future Socio-Economic Developments in the Russian Federation, which was published in an English edition by Anthony Rowe Publishing Services on behalf of Intourist Ltd. On Wednesday, 13 April 2005, Eduard Rossel was guest and speaker at a reception held at the Russian Embassy in Kensington Palace Gardens, London for the launch of his book. In his book Eduard Rossel gives a detailed microeconomic picture of the problems, prospects and performance of the economy and government at a regional level, and focuses on the importance of the natural resources of Russia's regions to the economy of Russia. He also gives a picture of the political structure of the Federation at a time when government of the regions was becoming more centralised.

In 2009, Rossel left the gubernatorial post, citing his own failed competency.

In 2018, Eduard Rossel met with vice governor of Sverdlovsk Oblast Aleksey Orlov, finance minister Victoria Kazakova, director of trust company "Belaya Gora", and head of the administration of Nizhniy Tagil, Vladislav Pinaev to discuss whether Belaya Gora should become a tourist resort. The plan is to create a ski resort with the help from the Canadian company Ecosign.

In 2022, he was added to the sanctions list of the British government following the Russian invasion of Ukraine.

In July 2022, it was reported that Rossel would lose the position of senator.

== Honours ==
- Order of Merit for the Fatherland;
  - 1st class (16 November 2009) - for outstanding contribution to strengthening Russian statehood, the socio-economic development of the field and many years of fruitful activity
  - 2nd class (5 April 2004) - for his great personal contribution to the development of Russian statehood and economic and social transformation of the region
  - 3rd class (24 April 2000) - for outstanding contribution to strengthening Russian statehood and the consistent implementation of the course of economic reforms
  - 4th class (20 July 1996) - for services to the state and many years of diligent work
- Order of Honour (9 October 2007) - for outstanding contribution to the socio-economic development of the field and many years of fruitful activity
- Order of the Badge of Honour, twice
  - for achievements in the construction of the first stage of rolling wide-flange beams shop - blooming "1500" Nizhny Tagil Metallurgical Plant named after VI Lenin (April 1975)
  - for the successful completion of the reconstruction of oxygen-converter shop of Nizhny Tagil Metallurgical Plant named after VI Lenin (May 1980)
- Medal "For Valiant Labor. To commemorate the 100th anniversary of the birth of Vladimir Ilyich Lenin" (November 1969)
- Diploma of the President of the Russian Federation (12 December 2008) - for active participation in the drafting of the Constitution and a great contribution to the democratic foundations of the Russian Federation
- Order of Friendship of Peoples (Belarus, 8 October 2007) - for his great personal contribution to strengthening and developing economic, scientific, technological and cultural ties between Belarus and Sverdlovsk Oblast of the Russian Federation
- Order "Dostyk" (Kazakhstan, 2008)
- Medal "Dank" (Kyrgyzstan, 27 May 1999) - for his significant contribution to strengthening friendship, economic and cultural cooperation between the Kyrgyz Republic and the Russian Federation at the regional level
- Order "For Services to the State of Baden-Württemberg" (Baden-Wurttemberg, Germany, 2008) - for outstanding contribution to the international inter-regional cooperation
- Order of Holy Prince Daniel of Moscow, 1st (Russian Orthodox Church, 2003) and 2nd (1997) classes
- Order of St. Sergius, 1st class (Russian Orthodox Church, 2000)
- Order of Saint Blessed Prince Dimitry (Russian Orthodox Church, 2002)
- Order of St. Seraphim of Sarov, 2nd class (Russian Orthodox Church, 2009)
- Honorary citizen of Yekaterinburg, Nizhny Tagil and the Sverdlovsk region (Decree of the Governor of Sverdlovsk region № 883-HS, 7 October 2010)
- Honoured Builder of the RSFSR (1983)

== Personal life ==
Eduard Rossel has a daughter who resides in Düsseldorf.
