= Yevgeny Kuyvashev =

Russian politician

- Евгений Куйвашев
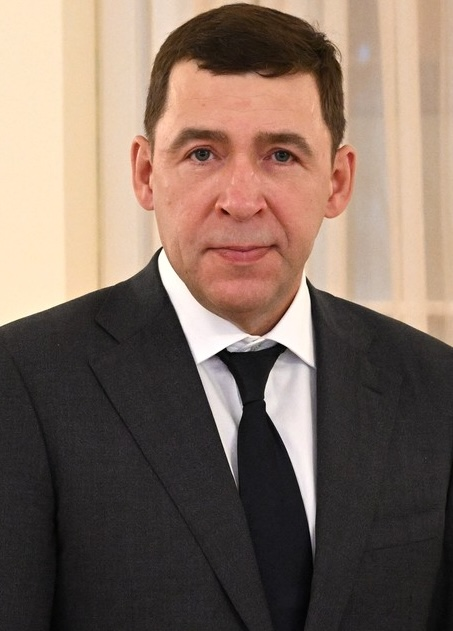
- Kuyvashev in 2023

4th Governor of Sverdlovsk Oblast
- In office 29 May 2012 – 26 March 2025
- Preceded by: Aleksandr Misharin
- Succeeded by: Denis Pasler

3rd Presidential Envoy to the Ural Federal District
- In office 6 September 2011 – 14 May 2012
- President: Dmitry Medvedev; Vladimir Putin
- Preceded by: Nikolay Vinnichenko
- Succeeded by: Igor Kholmanskikh

Head of Tyumen City Administration
- In office 5 July 2007 – 6 September 2011
- Preceded by: Sergey Smetanyuk
- Succeeded by: Aleksandr Moor

Head of Tobolsk City Administration
- In office 30 November 2005 – 5 July 2007
- Preceded by: Yevgeny Vorobyov
- Succeeded by: Ivan Olenberg

Personal details
- Born: Yevgeny Vladmirovich Kuyvashev; 16 March 1971 (age 55) Lugovskoy, Russian SFSR, Soviet Union
- Party: United Russia
- Spouse: Natalya
- Children: Yelizaveta; Dmitry
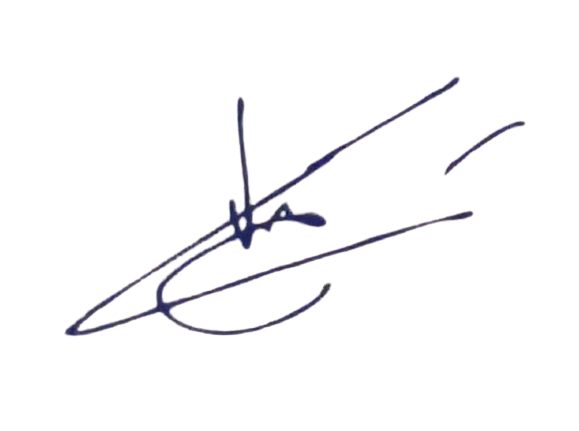
- Signature

Yevgeny Vladmirovich Kuyvashev (Russian: Евгений Владимирович Куйвашев; born 16 March 1971) is a Russian politician who has served as 4th Governor of Sverdlovsk Oblast from 2012 to 2025. He served as the acting governor from 14 May 2012 to 29 May 2012, and again from 17 April 2017 to 18 September 2017.

Kuyvashev previously served as the 3rd Plenipotentiary Presidential Envoy of the Ural Federal District from 2011 to 2012. He held in offices such as the Head of the Administration of Tyumen from 2007 to 2011, and Tobolsk from 2005 to 2007.

He has the federal state civilian service rank of 1st class Active State Councillor of the Russian Federation.

== Biography ==
Yevgeny Kuyvashev was born on 16 March 1971 in the village of Lugovskoy, in Khanty-Mansiysky District, of the Khanty-Mansi Autonomous Okrug, of Tyumen Oblast.

From 1989 to 1991, Kuyvashev served in the military service of the Soviet Army.

From 1991 to 1993, he studied at the Tobolsk Medical School named after Volodya Soldatov, specializing in "dentist-orthodontist".

=== Labor activity ===
After graduating from high school, he worked for some time as a mechanic in the "Surgutremstroy" trust.

After serving in the army in 1991, he worked for a short time as a physical education methodologist at the Department of Technological Transport in Surgut.

After receiving his education, he worked in the Poikovsky village of the Nefteyugansk region of the Khanty-Mansiysk Autonomous Okrug, first as a dental technician, then as a deputy head of the branch of the Union of Afghan Veterans on commercial issues, a concrete mixer driver, a high-altitude installer, and a legal adviser.

=== Administrative work ===
In 1997, Kuyvashev moved to the Administration of the Poikovsky village, where he worked first as an assistant to the head Eduard Khudainatov, then as his deputy, and after Khudainatov moved to work in the Presidential Administration in 2000, he took his place.

In 1999, he went the Moscow Military Institute of the Federal Border Service of the Russia with a degree in lawyer, in a correspondence course.

In parallel with his work in the administration, Kuyvashev taught the theory of state and law, municipal law at the Poikovsky branch of Tyumen State University.

From 2004 to 2005, he was the deputy head of the department of bailiffs in Moscow.

On 30 November 2005, Kuyvashev was unanimously approved by the deputies of the Tobolsk City Duma by the head of the Tobolsk administration.

On 14 June 2007, Kuyvashev applied for a competition to fill the post of head of the Tyumen administration after the resignation of the former mayor, Sergey Smetanyuk, and on 5 July 2007, he was elected to this position by Tyumen City Duma.

In 2010, he initiated professional retraining at Tyumen State University under the program "State and Municipal Administration".

Many media outlets also report that in 2002, Kuyvashev graduated from Yale University with a degree in management. At the same time, Kuyvashev himself in the media commented on the information about his studies at Yale University as follows: "I did not study at Yale - I just listened to lectures there. I did not study, I have no diploma.".

On 29 January 2011, Kuyvashev was the deputy Plenipotentiary Presidential Envoy of the Urals Federal District. From 6 September 2011 to 14 May 14, 2012, Kuyvashev was promoted to the Plenipotentiary Presidential Envoy of the Urals Federal District.

From 14 September 2011 to 14 May 2012, he was the Member of the Security Council of the Russia.

=== Governor of Sverdlovsk Oblast ===
On 14 May 2012, Kuyvashev became the acting Governor of the Sverdlovsk Oblast.

On 24 May 2012, Russian President Vladimir Putin submitted to the Legislative Assembly of the Sverdlovsk Oblast the candidacy of Yevgeny Kuyvashev to empower the governor of the Sverdlovsk Oblast. The candidacy was supported by a majority of votes of the members of parliaments of the Legislative Assembly of the Sverdlovsk Oblast, and on May 29, 2012, Kuyvashev officially took office as the regional governor.

From 28 July 2012 to 22 February 2013 and from 10 November 2015 to 6 April 2016, he was the member of the Presidium of the State Council of the Russia.

During the governorship of Kuyvashev, the system of government bodies of the Sverdlovsk Oblast was changed, repeatedly making amendments to the Charter of the region. In July 2012, on the initiative of Kuyvashev, the post of vice-governor was introduced, but already in December of the next year, this post was abolished. In 2016, the post of regional prime minister was abolished with the assignment of his duties to the governor. Thus, by the beginning of 2017, Kuyvashev became both the governor and the head of the regional government.

In 2012, at the suggestion of Kuyvashev, he sent to the Administration of the President of Russia, a working group was created in the Ministry of Health to consider the issue of compulsory licensing of the activities of all organizations involved in the rehabilitation of drug addicts. In his opinion, such licensing is a matter of citizens' safety. At this time, on his behalf in the region, a state rehabilitation center "Ural without drugs" was created. The decree on its creation was signed on 3 July 2012.

On 18 September 2016, Kuyvashev took part in the elections to the Legislative Assembly of the Sverdlovsk Oblats, heading the list of the United Russia party. After the elections, he gave up his deputy mandate, without starting to act as a deputy.

At the end of 2016, the film director Nikita Mikhalkov criticized the Yeltsin Center, which opened in November 2015, with the financial support of the authorities of the Sverdlovsk Oblast. Kuyvashev said that he was proud to have taken part in the creation of the Yeltsin Center, and said that he was ready to personally lead Mikhalkov on a tour of it.

At the end of March 2017, Kuyvashev found advantages in the decision of the Federal Minister Denis Manturov to transfer the international arms exhibition Russia Arms Expo from Nizhny Tagil to the Patriot park in Moscow Oblast.

According to the governor, this event "will become an incentive for the implementation of new breakthrough initiatives in the Urals". The former governor of Sverdlovsk Oblast, Eduard Rossel (on whose initiative this exhibition was founded in 1999) has of a different opinion, who asked to keep the Russia Arms Expo in Nizhny Tagil and turned to Kuyvashev about the exhibition.

In April 2017, Kuyvashev supported the need to reform public transport in Yekaterinburg (in particular, to eliminate "duplicate" routes) in accordance with the decision of the city manager of Yekaterinburg, Aleksander Yakob, which was adopted in April of the same year.

On 17 April 2017, Kuyvashev resigned at his own request. On the same day, by the decree of the President of Russia, he was appointed acting Governor of the Sverdlovsk Region "until the person elected as the Governor of the Sverdlovsk Oblast takes office." He won the elections on 10 September 2017 with 62.16% of the vote.

On 8 December 2018, on the basis of the decision taken by the delegates of the XVIII Congress of the United Russia party, Kuyvashev was introduced to the Supreme Council of the party.

In 2022, Kuyvashev was sanctioned by the British government following the Russian invasion of Ukraine.

== Criticism ==
Information appeared in the press about Kuyvashev's informal connection with energy businessmen Artyom Bikov and Alexei Bobrov, who were called his sponsors. However, Kuyvashev himself denies this connection: "It is not my fault that they have assets in all regions where I worked. Wherever you start working, Bikov and Bobrov are already there.".

Aksana Panova, the former editor-in-chief of the Ural Internet agency Ura.ru, who was accused at one time in a number of criminal cases, called Kuyvashev the "customer" of her prosecution.

Znak.com noted in 2013 that Kuyvashev, despite the regional budget cuts and economic difficulties, increased funding for "PR": in 2013, 1.136 billion rubles were allocated to the media from the budget (of which 0.5 billion was for the purchase of an unfinished television tower in Yekaterinburg), while in 2012 only 368 million rubles were spent for these purposes. Критику издания вызвал также тот факт, что значительная часть трат на СМИ из бюджета области непрозрачна. The publication was also criticized by the fact that a significant part of the expenditures on the media from the regional budget is not transparent. In October 2013, opposition deputies criticized the authorities of the Sverdlovsk Oblast for the fact that the bulk of media spending from the budget of the Sverdlovsk region goes to the "Regional newspaper" and the OTV television channel. The private media also get some. For example, by order of Kuyvashev, 20 million rubles were transferred to the Malina project.

== Personal life ==
Natalia (born 1974) is an entrepreneur. She is the director and co-owner of Lelya LLC, which owns the Three Glasses chain of elite wine stores located in Tyumen and Tobolsk.

The Kuyvashev family has 2 children, with daughter Yelizaveta (born in 1997) and a son, Dmitry.

Kuyvashev describes himself to be fond of sports, goes in for biathlon and hockey, takes part in all-star matches. He is a fan of the hockey team "Avtomobilist" and the football club "Ural".

In music he prefers Russian rock, which is familiar with the veterans of the Sverdlovsk rock club, is friends with Alexander Pantykin.

He is also good at painting.

=== Wealth ===
In 2011, the income of Kuyvashev, who worked as the Presidential Envoy, amounted to 3.7 million rubles, the income of his, Natalya, with 3.1 million rubles.

According to Vyacheslav Tselishchev, a specialist at one of the Yekaterinburg watch salons, Kuyvashev has the Swiss watch of the Jaeger Le Coultre Master Control brand, which costed 700 thousand rubles in 2012.

At the end of 2016, while working in the government of the Sverdlovsk Oblast, Kuyvashev earned 3,333,627.89 rubles. As of 31 December 2016, he owned an apartment of 144 sq.m. in Yekaterinburg and 1/3 share in an apartment of 131.7 sq.m. in the Tyumen Oblast, a jet ski VX700 and a MZSA trailer 2006 release. The data on the spouse's income for this period differ: the website of the governor of the Sverdlovsk Oblast indicates the amount of 9,967,789.03 rubles, while the information posted by the Election Commission of the Sverdlovsk region during the election of the governor indicated the amount of 2,920,271.03 rubles, the source of income were LLC "Lelya", IE Kuyvasheva N.S., JSC "TsVMIR" SIBERIA "".

After becoming the governor of the Sverdlovsk Oblast, Kuyvashev bought an apartment in Yekaterinburg worth about 13.5-16.5 million rubles.
