= Demyan Chubatyi =

Ukrainian footballer

Personal information
- Full name: Demyan Mykhaylovych Chubatyi
- Date of birth: 16 March 2004 (age 22)
- Place of birth: Ovruch, Ukraine
- Height: 1.76 m (5 ft 9 in)
- Position: Defender

Team information
- Current team: Hirnyk-Sport Horishni Plavni
- Number: 29

Youth career
- 2015–2017: DYuSSh Ovruch
- 2017–2021: Dynamo Kyiv

Senior career*
Years	Team	Apps	(Gls)
2020–2021	Dynamo Kyiv	0	(0)
2021–2024	Oleksandriya	2	(0)
2024–2025	Oleksandriya-2	0	(0)
2025–	Hirnyk-Sport Horishni Plavni	3	(0)
- * Club domestic league appearances and goals as of 4 May 2025

Demyan Mykhaylovych Chubatyi (Ukrainian: Дем'ян Михайлович Чубатий; born 16 March 2004) is a Ukrainian professional footballer who plays as a defender for Hirnyk-Sport Horishni Plavni.

== Career ==
Born in Ovruch, Chubatyi is a product of the local Ovruch youth sportive school and Dynamo Kyiv youth sportive system.

In July 2021 he signed a contract with the Ukrainian Premier League club FC Oleksandriya and made his debut for this side as the second half-time substituted player in the away winning match against FC Metalist 1925 Kharkiv on 26 October 2021 in the Round of 16 of the Ukrainian Cup.
