= Andrey Kuznetsov (politician) =

Russian politician

Andrey Kuznetsov MP
- Андрей Кузнецов
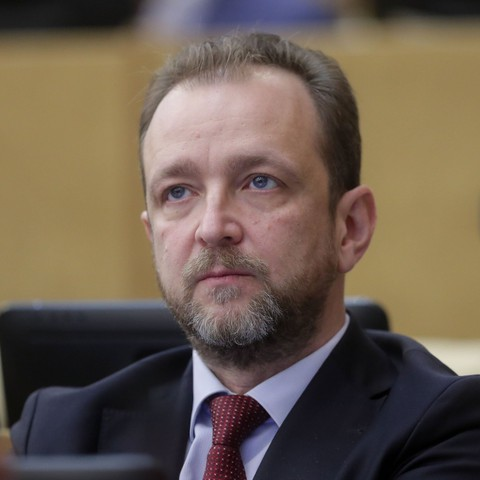

Member of the State Duma (Party List Seat)
- Incumbent
- Assumed office 12 October 2021

Personal details
- Born: 29 May 1972 (age 53) Nizhnyaya Tura, Sverdlovsk Oblast, RSFSR, USSR
- Party: A Just Russia — For Truth
- Education: Ural State University

Andrey Anatolievich Kuznetsov (Russian: Андрей Анатольевич Кузнецов; born September 24, 1972, Nizhnyaya Tura) is a Russian political figure and a deputy of the 8th State Dumas.

From 1993 to 2003, Kuznetsov worked as a correspondent and editor-in-chief in a number of Yekaterinburg media outlets. From 2003 to 2012, he was the executive director of the Ural Institute of Applied Politics and Economics. In 2012, he was appointed the first deputy head of administration of the governor of Sverdlovsk Oblast. From 2013 to 2017, Kuznetsov served as an advisor to Sergey Mironov. From 2020 to 2021, he was the deputy chief of staff of the A Just Russia — For Truth faction in the State Duma. Since September 2021, he has served as deputy of the 8th State Duma.
