= Alexander Demin =

Russian politician (born 1988)

Alexander Demin MP
- Александр Дёмин
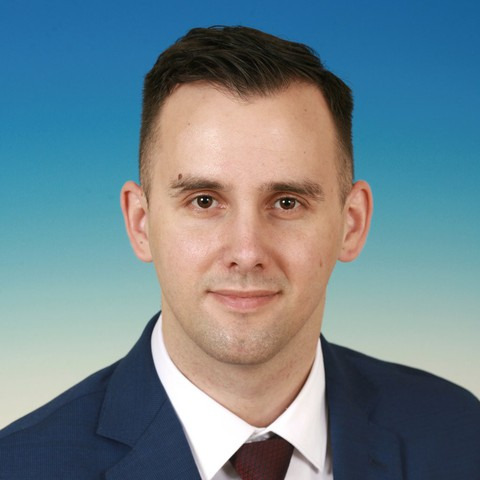

Chairman of the State Duma committee on small and medium-sized businesses
- Incumbent
- Assumed office 12 October 2021
- Preceded by: position has been established

Deputy of the State Duma Russia
- Incumbent
- Assumed office 19 September 2021
- Constituency: Sverdlovsk Oblast

Personal details
- Born: 23 September 1988 (age 38) Rostov-on-Don, RSFSR, USSR
- Party: New People
- Education: Modern University for the Humanities; Southern Federal University

Alexander Vyacheslavovich Demin (Russian: Александр Вячеславович Дёмин; born 23 September 1988, Rostov-on-Don) is a Russian political figure and a chairman of the State Duma Russia committee on small and medium-sized businesses from 12 October 2021 year.

Deputy of the 8th State Duma.

== Biography ==
Born on September 23, 1988, in Rostov-on-Don.

In 2009, he graduated from the Faculty of Psychology of the Modern University for the Humanities. In 2015, he graduated from Southern Federal University with a degree in organizational and developmental psychology.

From 2006 to 2009, he worked as a counselor at the Berezka children’s health camp in Rossosh, Voronezh Oblast.

From 2009 to 2010, he completed compulsory military service in the Russian Aerospace Defence Forces.

Since 2012, he worked at the Orlyonok All-Russian Children's Center as a counselor and later as deputy head for research and methodology.

He headed a project of the Kapitany charitable foundation supporting educational programs, established by Alexey Nechaev, head of Faberlic and leader of the New People party. In 2015, he became acting генеральный директор of the Kapitany charitable foundation.

From 2016 to 2021, he headed the dean’s office division of the Kapitany Business Faculty at Plekhanov Russian University of Economics.

At the same time, from 2018 to 2019, he led the “My First Business” educational competition for school students organized by the autonomous non-profit organization Russia – Land of Opportunity. He was also a member of a working group of the Agency for Strategic Initiatives on legislative and regulatory barriers hindering the development of the non-state education sector in Russia.

Member of the New People party since 2020.

Since September 2021 he has served as deputy of the 8th State Duma.

== Sanctions ==
He was sanctioned by the UK government in 2022 in relation to the Russo-Ukrainian War.
