= Legislative Assembly of Sverdlovsk Oblast =

Regional parliament of Sverdlovsk Oblast, Russia

Legislative Assembly of Sverdlovsk Oblast Законодательное собрание Свердловской области
- 8th legislature

Type
- Type: Unicameral

Leadership
- Chairman: Lyudmila Babushkina, United Russia since 20 December 2011

Structure
- Seats: 50
- Political groups: United Russia (33) CPRF (9); SRZP (4); LDPR (2) NP (2)

Elections
- Voting system: Mixed
- Last election: 19 September 2021
- Next election: 2026

Meeting place
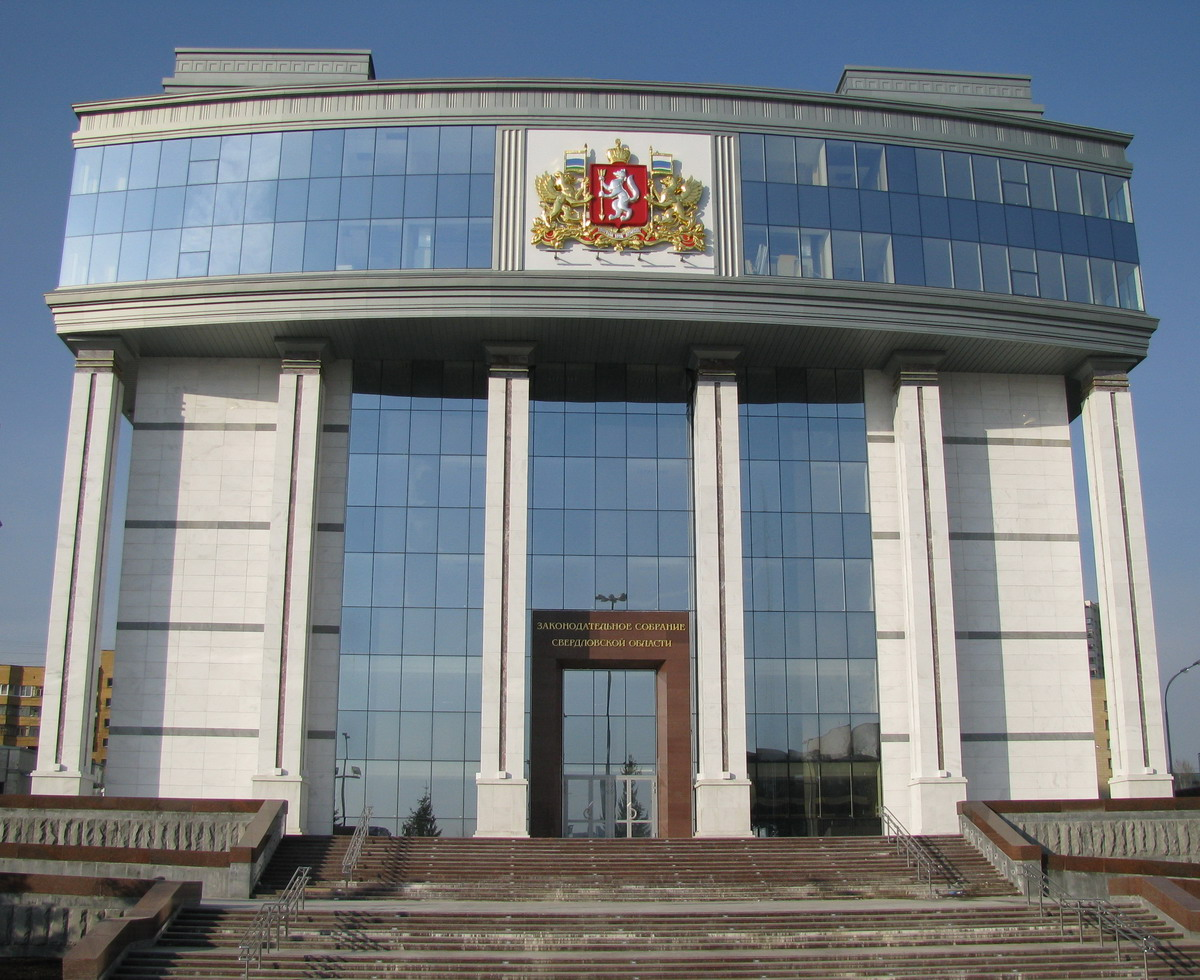
- 10 Boris Yeltsin St., Yekaterinburg

Website
- zsso.ru

The Legislative Assembly of Sverdlovsk Oblast (Russian: Законодательное собрание Свердловской области) is the regional parliament of Sverdlovsk Oblast, a federal subject of Russia. A total of 50 deputies are elected for five-year terms.

== Electoral system ==
According to Article 32 of the Charter of Sverdlovsk Oblast, the Legislative Assembly is unicameral, with a total number of 50 members. 25 of them are elected in party lists, and the other 25 deputies are elected by single-mandate constituencies. The term length for deputies is five years.

== History ==
The Soviet-era Regional Council of People's Deputies was replaced by the Sverdlovsk Oblast Duma in 1994. Two years later, the Duma became the lower house of the newly established Legislative Assembly with the House of Representatives as its upper house. Elections were held to the House in 1996, 1998, 2000, 2004 and 2008 for all 21 seats. In the Sverdlovsk Oblast Duma, half of the total number of seats (14) was at stake every two years. In 2011, bicameralism was abandoned in Sverdlovsk Oblast and the new unicameral Legislative Assembly was elected.

== Elections ==
=== 2021 ===
Party	%	Seats
United Russia	35.56	33
Communist Party of the Russian Federation	22.98	9
A Just Russia — For Truth	14.50	4
Liberal Democratic Party of Russia	9.35	2
New People	9.19	2
Yabloko	2.75	0
Registered voters/turnout	47.82	

== Composition ==
=== 2011 ===
- United Russia — 29 seats
- A Just Russia — 9 seats
- Communist Party — 8 seats
- Liberal Democratic Party — 4 seats

=== 2016 ===
- United Russia — 35 seats
- A Just Russia — 5 seats
- Communist Party — 4 seats
- Liberal Democratic Party — 4 seats

=== 2021 ===
- United Russia — 33 seats
- Communist Party — 9 seats
- A Just Russia — For Truth — 4 seats
- Liberal Democratic Party — 2 seats
- New People — 2 seats
