= Romanov Empire =

Romanov Empire may refer to:

- The Tsardom of Russia (1547-1721), ruled by the Romanov dynasty after 1613
- The Russian Empire (1721-1917)
- The House of Romanov, a European dynasty
- The Romanov Empire (micronation), est. 2011
