= Vehicle registration plates of Russia =

Russian Federation
- Russian private vehicle registration plate from Tver Oblast.
- Country: Russia
- Country code: RUS

Current series
- Size: 520 mm × 110 mm 20.5 in × 4.3 in
- Serial format: A123BC4(56)
- Colour (front): Black on white
- Colour (rear): Black on white

Vehicle registration plates are the mandatory number plates used to display the registration mark of a vehicle, and have existed in Russia for many decades. Most motor vehicles which are used on public roads are required by law to display them. Having a number plate obstructed by snow, mud, paper, or any other tool that makes any of the digits and letters illegible is considered an administrative offense and results in a fine.

== Current plate format ==
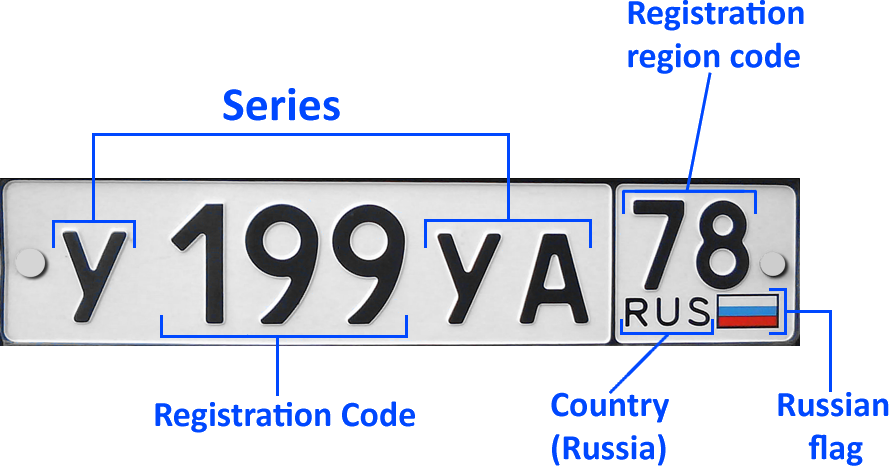
Breakdown of the main elements of the Russian vehicle registration plate.

The rightmost section of the registration plate with the region (177 denotes Moscow) and country (RUS) code

The current format uses a letter followed by 3 digits and two more letters. To improve legibility of the numbers for Russian cars abroad, only a small subset of Cyrillic characters that look like Latin characters are used (12 letters: А, В, Е, К, М, Н, О, Р, С, Т, У, Х), additionally D was issued on some very early plates. Finally, the region number (77, 97, 99, 177, 197, 199, 777, 797 and 799 for Moscow; 78, 98, 178, and 198 for Saint Petersburg, etc.) and the international code RUS with the 1991 to 1993 Russian flag typically to the right of it, however the flag is not mandatory, and since 2013 owners may order plates without it.

There is a different format for trailers (2 letters and 4 digits). Motorcycles, mopeds and scooters plates are made of square reflective plates and its format is 4 digits at the top and two letters at the bottom. These plates lack a national flag.

The standard size for the license plate is 520 mm by 112 mm.

Vehicles used by certain organisations or categories of persons carry special plates:

Image	Description
	Police forces have special numbers on blue colored plates and the format is one letter and four digits. The letter signifies the branch of the police force, and its meaning may change from city to city; for example, in Moscow, A #### 99 rus stands for traffic police, У #### 99 rus for patrol cars, O #### 99 rus for police guard dog service etc.
	Diplomatic cars have white characters on a red background. The first three digits on the plate are a code identifying the embassy to which they belong, assigned in order based on the date at which that country established diplomatic relations with the Soviet Union or post-Soviet Russia (but not Russian Empire, so it starts with the recognition of the Soviet Union by the Great Britain). For example, the United Kingdom is 001, the United States is 004, and South Sudan is 168. Numbers 500 and above identify international organizations, such as 505 for IMF. On ambassadors' cars this code is followed by CD and a digit (004 CD 1 77 rus), while cars assigned to rank-and-file diplomats have this code followed by D and three digits (for example, 004 D 108 77 rus). The lacking diplomatic status administrative and technical staff of embassies, consulates or international organizations have license plate format (004 T 001 77 rus).
	The military license plates have white characters on a black background and the format is NNNN LL for vehicles and LL NNNN for trailers. In this case the two digits on the right are not a regional code but a code for the military district, armed forces branch or service, or federal executive body where military service is required by law. For example, NNNN LL 14 rus is a vehicle belonging to the Railway Troops, NNNN LL 18 rus denotes the Ministry of Emergency Situations, NNNN LL 23 rus is for the Strategic Missile Troops, NNNN LL 21 rus for the Southern Military District etc. Unlike all other categories, the military number plates are not light reflective.
	Public transport vehicles (such as buses, licensed taxis and licensed share taxis) have black characters on a yellow background and the format is LL NNN. Since such vehicles are relatively few, the region code does not change often; in Moscow, for example, yellow "public transport" plates are still issued with the code 77 in December 2009. (Note: This type is not to be confused with the now defunct similar-looking yellow license plates having the format LL NNN L, which were issued prior to 2002 to cars registered to foreign companies operating in Russia; the latter type has now been withdrawn.)
	Trailer plates have colors very similar to normal passenger vehicles, but have format LL NNNN. Until July 2008, these plates had to be duplicated on the rear surface of the trailer, in a large print.
	Temporary and transit licence plates. Made from glossy laminated paper with holographic sticker in the upper left corner.
	Temporary and transit licence plates for exported vehicles with Т digit in left part of plate.
	Motorcycle registration plates. From 2019 updated standard introduced reduced size plates 190 mm (7.5 in)x145 mm (5.7 in) (with Russian national flag on it).

Country code on the bottom right.

Special plates in the above categories never carry the Russian flag, except for trailers.

There are special series (usually numbers starting with A) reserved for government officials (for example, A 001 AA usually belongs to the governor of the region). The license plates for federal government officials originally had a larger flag instead of the regional code but this type has now been withdrawn as well.

Rich businessmen, prominent politicians and crime lords often use para-legally acquired special licence plates (government or police) to get preferential treatment from the transport police and as a status symbol. Often, this is used in conjunction with a flashing siren. The Society of Blue Buckets is a protest movement that opposes this trend.

As of 2014, there are new codes for Russian plates in occupied territories; number 82 for the Republic of Crimea and 92 for Sevastopol. The Russian Federation annexed Crimea from Ukraine and now administers it as two federal subjects: the Republic of Crimea and the federal city of Sevastopol. Ukraine, backed by most of the international community, refuses to accept the annexation and continues to assert its right over the peninsula. Vehicles with such plates may have difficulty entering countries which recognize Crimea as Ukrainian territory and thus deem documents issued by the Russian Federation in Crimea to be invalid.

After Russia's February 2022 escalation of the Russo-Ukrainian War, Russia began issuing license plates for its conquered territories in Ukraine's Donetsk, Kherson, Luhansk, and Zaporizhzhia oblasts. It also began to issue plates numbered 188 in Kupiansk for the Kharkiv Oblast, but its forces were pushed out of the oblast's territory during the Kharkiv counteroffensive in the fall of 2022.

== Runout problem ==
As per GOST provision, only 1,726,272 combinations may be issued within one administration unit (the digits 000 are not allowed). In certain regions, the number of vehicles exceeds that number. Additionally, previous combinations cannot be reused after a vehicle has been de-registered. This scheme creates an issue where the number of possible license plate combinations cannot meet the demand of the number of vehicle registrations.

A short-term solution saw the introduction of additional codes for regions that suffered from this problem. Thus, some regions have two or three codes issued to them, the city of St. Petersburg has four, Moscow Oblast has six, and the federal city of Moscow has ten codes. But this does not fully solve the problem, as the authorities may eventually run out of three-numeral regional codes, and a fourth digit will not fit without changing the standardised layout of the plate. Since October 2013, when a vehicle is registered to a new owner, the registration plate could remain on the vehicle and a new registration number is not required, even if the vehicle is registered in another region.

The problem was resolved by re-registering plates that are no longer in use. Also, since 2013, the owner can keep the license plate for himself personally, or leave it on the car when selling it to another person.

== Regional codes ==
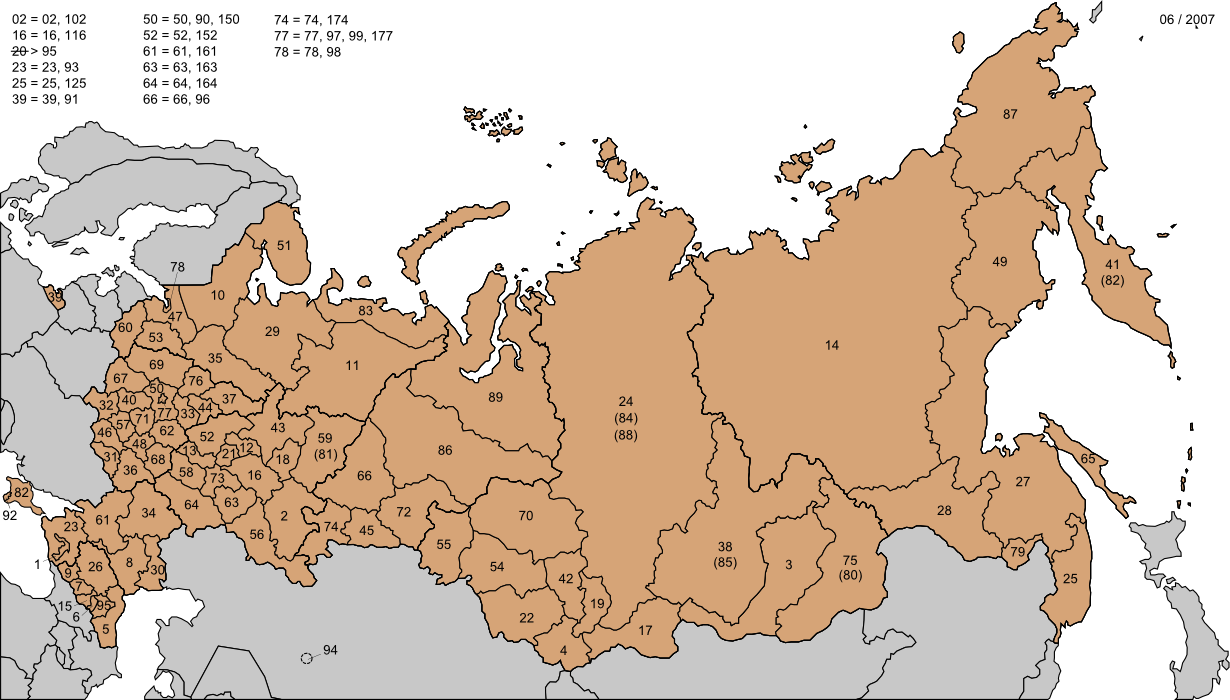
Russian regional vehicle registration codes

The license plate regional codes from 01 to 89 originally matched the numerical order of the federal subjects of Russia as listed in the Article 65 of the Constitution of Russia at the moment of the creation of the standard. In the following years some codes were reassigned or discontinued (for example code number 20 for the Chechen Republic: to prevent illegal registrations, and due to the destruction of the database in the 1990s, all the vehicles of Chechnya were reregistered). As the populous regions started running out of license plate combinations, new codes past code 89 were assigned to them as well. Additional triple-digit codes were created by prepending a "1", "2", "7", or "9" to the existing regional code (e.g. 54 and 154 for Novosibirsk Oblast, or 16, 116 and 716 in Tatarstan). Those regions with an asterisk (*) beside them were involved in mergers with other regions, so are no longer issued, and have their codes listed with an asterisk with the region they are now a part of.

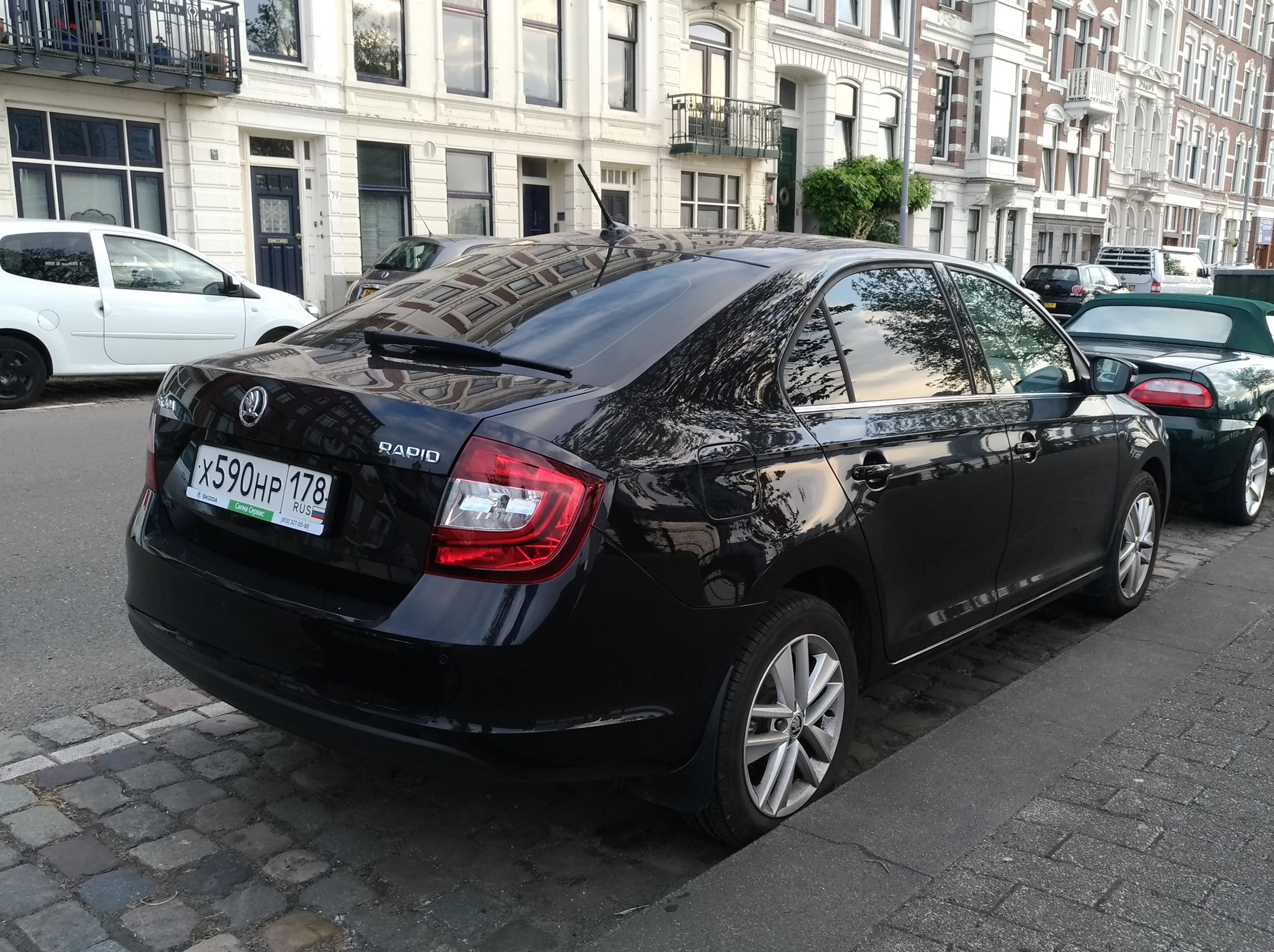
A car with its registration plate from Saint Petersburg.

In June 2014, code 82 (formerly registered to the Koryak Autonomous District) was put back into registration for the Republic of Crimea, while Sevastopol adopted the new code 92. The reason for the decision to use code 82 was because, between the beginning of this plate format and the merging of the district, Koryak AO only registered 1,548 civilian car license plates (starting at A001AA/82 and ending at B549AA/82) and far less of other types (some types, such as public transport plates, were never issued in the region).

Code	The region of Russian Federation
01	Republic of Adygea
02, 102, 702	Republic of Bashkortostan
03	Republic of Buryatia
04	Altai Republic
05, 105	Republic of Dagestan
06	Republic of Ingushetia
07	Kabardino-Balkar Republic
08	Republic of Kalmykia
09	Karachay-Cherkess Republic
10	Republic of Karelia
11	Komi Republic
12	Mari El Republic
13, 113	Republic of Mordovia
14	Sakha Republic
15	Republic of North Ossetia–Alania
16, 116, 716	Republic of Tatarstan
17	Tuva Republic
18	Udmurt Republic
19	Republic of Khakassia
(20) (Note: Abolished in 2000 and superseded by 95; all vehicles bearing license plates with this regional code were subject to mandatory re-registration), 95	Chechen Republic
21, 121	Chuvash Republic
22, 122	Altai Krai
23, 93, 123, 193, 323	Krasnodar Krai
24, 84* (Note: Previously belonged to Taymyr Autonomous Okrug, which became part of Krasnoyarsk Krai in 2007), 88* (Note: Previously belonged to Evenk Autonomous Okrug, which became part of Krasnoyarsk Krai in 2007), 124, 224	Krasnoyarsk Krai
25, 125	Primorsky Krai
26, 126	Stavropol Krai
27	Khabarovsk Krai
28	Amur Oblast
29	Arkhangelsk Oblast
30	Astrakhan Oblast
31, 131	Belgorod Oblast
32	Bryansk Oblast
33, 133	Vladimir Oblast
34, 134	Volgograd Oblast
35	Vologda Oblast
36, 136	Voronezh Oblast
37	Ivanovo Oblast
38, 85* (Note: Previously belonged to Ust-Orda Buryat Autonomous Okrug, which became part of Irkutsk Oblast in 2008), 138	Irkutsk Oblast
39, (91) (Note: Transit license plates only)	Kaliningrad Oblast
40	Kaluga Oblast
41, 82* (Note: Previously belonged to Koryak Autonomous Okrug, which was merged with Kamchatka Oblast in 2007)	Kamchatka Krai
42, 142	Kemerovo Oblast
43	Kirov Oblast
44	Kostroma Oblast
45	Kurgan Oblast
46	Kursk Oblast
47, 147	Leningrad Oblast
48	Lipetsk Oblast
49	Magadan Oblast
50, 90, 150, 190, 250, 550, 750, 790	Moscow Oblast
51	Murmansk Oblast
52, 152, 252	Nizhny Novgorod Oblast
53	Novgorod Oblast
54, 154	Novosibirsk Oblast
55, 155	Omsk Oblast
56, 156	Orenburg Oblast
57	Oryol Oblast
58	Penza Oblast
59, 81* (Note: Previously belonged to Komi-Permyak Autonomous Okrug, which was merged with Perm Oblast in 2005), 159	Perm Krai
60	Pskov Oblast
61, 161, 761	Rostov Oblast
62	Ryazan Oblast
63, 163, 763	Samara Oblast
64, 164	Saratov Oblast
65	Sakhalin Oblast
66, 96, 166, 196	Sverdlovsk Oblast
67	Smolensk Oblast
68	Tambov Oblast
69	Tver Oblast
70	Tomsk Oblast
71	Tula Oblast
72, 172	Tyumen Oblast
73, 173	Ulyanovsk Oblast
74, 174, 774	Chelyabinsk Oblast
75, 80* (Note: Previously belonged to Agin-Buryat Autonomous Okrug, which was merged with Chita Oblast in 2008)	Zabaykalsky Krai
76	Yaroslavl Oblast
77, 97, 99, 177, 197, 199, 777, 797, 799, 977, 997	Moscow
78, 98, 178, 198, 778	St. Petersburg
79	Jewish Autonomous Oblast
80* (Note: Trailers and motorcycles only), 180	Donetsk People's Republic
81*, 181	Luhansk People's Republic
82*	Republic of Crimea
83	Nenets Autonomous Okrug
84*, 184	Kherson Oblast
85*, 185	Zaporozhye Oblast
86, 186	Khanty-Mansi Autonomous Okrug
87	Chukotka Autonomous Okrug
89	Yamalo-Nenets Autonomous Okrug
92	Sevastopol
94	Baikonur and other territories outside of Russian Federation proper overseen by the Ministry of Internal Affairs
(188)	Initially assigned to Russian-occupied territories of Kharkiv Oblast, but very few plates with this code were issued
Internationally disputed areas in italics

== Codes of diplomatic representative offices and international organizations ==
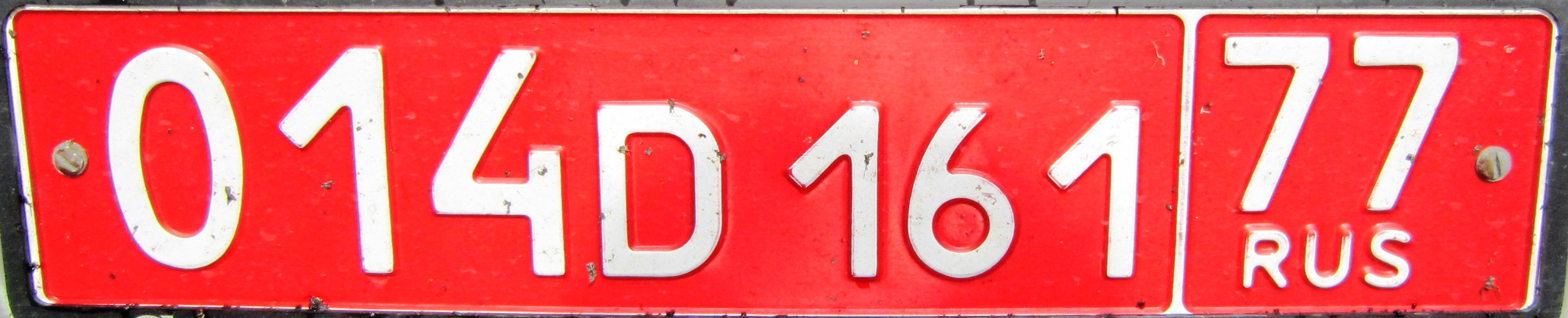
014 is the code for Norwegian diplomats in Russia

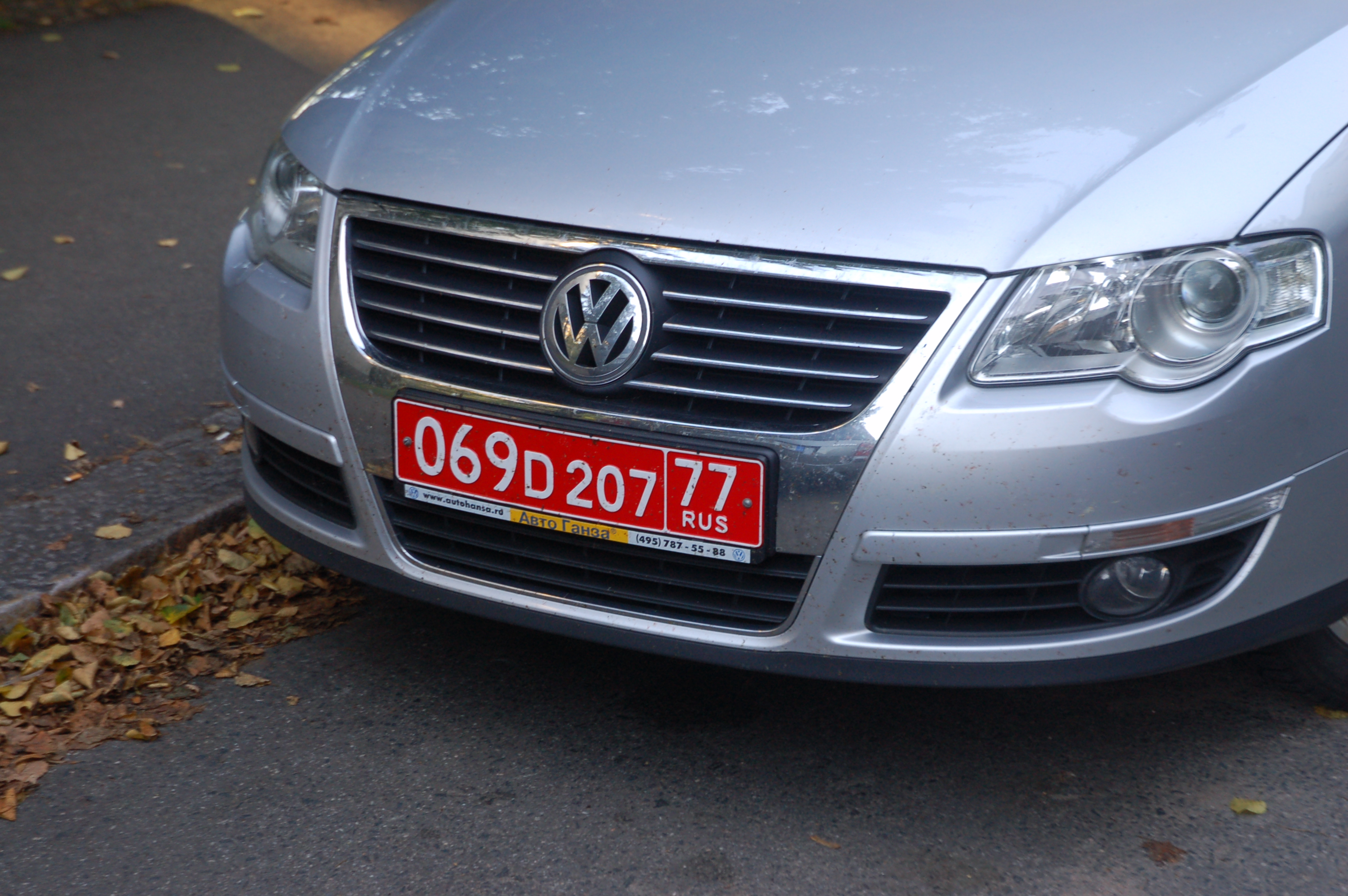
Diplomatic vehicle of the Finnish embassy in Moscow (as evidenced by the 069 number code).

According to the Ministry of Internal Affairs Order 282 from March 28, 2002.

Code	Country or organization
001	United Kingdom
002	Germany
003	Canada
004	United States
005	Japan
006	Spain
007	France
008	Belgium
009	Greece
010	Denmark
011	Italy
012	Luxembourg
013	Netherlands
014	Norway
015	Turkey
016	Australia
017	Austria
018	Algeria
019	Egypt
020	Rwanda
021	Argentina
022	Afghanistan
023	Myanmar
024	Bolivia
025	Brazil
026	Burundi
027	Ghana
028	Bangladesh
029	Guinea
030	Zambia
031	Peru
032	India
033	Indonesia
034	Jordan
035	Iraq
036	Iran
037	Ireland
038	Iceland
039	Cambodia
040	Kenya
041	Cyprus
042	Congo
043	Costa Rica
044	Kuwait
045	Laos
047	Lebanon
048	Libya
049	Mali
050	Morocco
051	Mexico
052	Nepal
053	Nigeria
054	Venezuela
055	New Zealand
056	Pakistan
057	Burkina Faso
058	Senegal
059	N/A (Note: Code 059 is a former code for Syria. The current code for Syria is 133.)
060	Somalia
061	Sudan
062	Sierra Leone
063	Thailand
064	Tanzania
065	Tunisia
066	Uganda
067	Uruguay
068	Philippines
069	Finland
070	Sri Lanka
071	Chad
072	Switzerland
073	Sweden
074	Ecuador
075	Ethiopia
076	Angola
077	Democratic Republic of Congo
078	Colombia
079	Cameroon
080	Guinea-Bissau
081	Portugal
082	Bulgaria
083	Hungary
084	N/A
085	N/A
086	Poland
087	North Korea
088	Cuba
089	Mongolia
090	China
091	Romania
092	N/A (Note: Code 092 is a former code for Czechoslovakia. Currently, codes for Czech Republic and Slovakia are 148 (Czech Republic), and 149 (Slovakia).)
093	Serbia
094	Benin
095	Gabon
096	Guyana
097	Mauritania
098	Madagascar
099	Malaysia
100	Niger
101	Singapore
102	Togo
103	Central African Republic
104	Jamaica
105	Yemen
106	N/A (Note: Code 106 is a former code for the Central African Republic. The current code for the Central African Republic is 103.)
107	Palestine
108	Nicaragua
109	Mozambique
110	Equatorial Guinea
111	Sovereign Military Order of Malta (Note: Earlier, code 111 belonged to the Council for Mutual Economic Assistance. Replaced by the Sovereign Military Order of Malta.)
112	Malta
113	Cape Verde
114	N/A
115	Zimbabwe
116	United Arab Emirates
117	Ivory Coast
118	Namibia
119	N/A (Note: Code 119 is a former code for South Africa. The current code for South Africa is 137.)
120	Oman
121	Qatar
122	N/A (Note: Code 122 is a former code for the Arab League. The current code for the Arab League is 503.)
123	N/A (Note: Code 123 is a former code for Liechtenstein.)
124	South Korea
125	Chile
126	Panama (Note: Earlier, code 126 belonged to UNESCO. Replaced by Panama.)
127	Israel
128	North Macedonia (Note: Earlier, code 128 belonged to the European Union. Replaced by North Macedonia.)
129	Albania
130	N/A (Note: Code 130 is a former code for the International Organizations.)
131	Vatican City
132	Lithuania
133	Syria
134	Estonia
135	Latvia
136	Bahrain
137	South Africa
138	Armenia
139	N/A (Note: Code 139 is a former code for Georgia. The current code Georgia is 158.)
140	Saudi Arabia
141	Slovenia
142	Uzbekistan
143	Kyrgyzstan
144	Croatia
145	Azerbaijan
146	Ukraine
147	Moldova
148	Czech Republic
149	Slovakia
150	Belarus
151	Tajikistan
152	Turkmenistan
153	Kazakhstan
154	Guatemala
155	Bosnia and Herzegovina
156	Eritrea
157	Paraguay
158	Georgia
159	Brunei
160	Gambia
161	Vietnam
162	Mauritius
163	Dominican Republic
164	Montenegro
165	South Ossetia
166	Abkhazia
167	Djibouti
168	South Sudan
169	El Salvador
499	(European Union) European Commission
500	European Bank for Reconstruction and Development
501	N/A (Note: Code 501 is a former code for the Un International Centre.)
502	N/A (Note: Code 502 is a former code for the Eurocommision. The current code for this organization is 499.)
503	Arab League
504	International Bank for Reconstruction and Development
505	International Monetary Fund
506	International Organization for Migration
507	International Federation of Red Cross and Red Crescent Societies
508	International Committee of the Red Cross
509	International Finance Corporation
510	United Nations Industrial Development Organization (UNIDO)
511	United Nations
512	United Nations Educational, Scientific and Cultural Organization (UNESCO); code 126 used earlier.
514	International Bank for Economic Complementation
515	International Investment Bank
516	Intersputnik International Organization of Space Communications
517	International Centre of Scientific and Technical Information
518	N/A (Note: Code 518 is a former code for the International Scientific and Technical Centre)
520	International Labour Organization
521	N/A (Note: Code 521 is a former code for the Interelectro (International Organization for Economic, Scientific and Technical Cooperation in Electrical Industry))
522	Coordination Centre of the Intergovernmental Commission for Cooperation in Computing Machinery
523	(Commonwealth of Independent States) Executive Committee of the CIS
524	European Space Agency
525	Eurasian Patent Organization
526	N/A (Note: Code 526 is a former code for the Taipei-Moscow Coordination Commission for Economic and Cultural Cooperation)
527	N/A (Note: Code 527 is a former code for the Headquarters for Coordination of Military Cooperation of the CIS)
528	(Commonwealth of Independent States) Interstate Bank
529	N/A (Note: Code 529 is a former code of the Eurasian Economic Community (earlier - Integration Committee of the Eurasian Economic Community))
530	International Research Institute of Management Problems
531	Collective Security Treaty Organization (CSTO)
532	(Commonwealth of Independent States) Intergovernmental Statistical Committee of the CIS
533	(Commonwealth of Independent States) Secretariate of Council of the CIS Interparliamentary Assembly
534	(Eurasian Economic Union) Eurasian Development Bank
535	(Commonwealth of Independent States) Intergovernmental Foundation for Humanitarian Cooperation of the CIS
555	(Eurasian Economic Union) Eurasian Economic Commission
556	Program Office of the Council of Europe in Russia
557	(Commonwealth of Independent States) Antiterrorist Centre of the CIS member states
559	Joint Institute for Nuclear Research
900	Honorary consuls and offices headed by them

=== Armed Forces license plate codes ===
The first list of digital codes on the license plates of vehicles of the Armed Forces of the Russian Federation and other executive bodies with military formations was approved by Order of the Minister of Defence of the Russian Federation No. 246, dated 1997..

Code	Formation, military district
09	Military Construction Complex of the Ministry of Defence of Russia (MCC of the Ministry of Defence of Russia)
10	Federal Security Service of the Russian Federation (FSB of Russia)
12	Border Service of the Federal Security Service of the Russian Federation
14	Railway Troops
15	Federal Service of the National Guard Troops of the Russian Federation (Rosgvardia)
16	Special Communications and Information Service of the Federal Protective Service of the Russian Federation (formerly FAPSI)
17	Central Council of Defense Sports and Technical Organizations of the Russian Federation
18	Ministry of the Russian Federation for Civil Defense, Emergencies, and Elimination of Consequences of Natural Disasters
20	Federal Road Construction Directorate under the Ministry of Defense of the Russian Federation
21	Southern Military District
23	Strategic Rocket Forces
25	Eastern Military District
26	Emergency Reserve (ER) Equipment (Long-Term Storage) of the Ground Forces of the Far Eastern Military District
27	Russian Air Defense Forces
29	9th Central Directorate of the Ministry of Defense of the Russian Federation
32	Transbaikal Military District (?)
34	Russian Air Forces
35	Ministry of Defence of the Russian Federation
39	12th Main Directorate of the Ministry of Defense of the Russian Federation (Nuclear Support)
43	Western Military District
45	Russian Navy
50	Russian Military Police
56	Space Forces
65	Central Military District
67	Russian Airborne Forces

== See also ==
- Vehicle registration plate
- Vehicle registration plates of Bulgaria, which uses similar letters and numbers
- European vehicle registration plates
