= East Line Group =

- Headquarters: Russia
- Website: www.dme.aero/eng/

East Line Group (Russian: Группа Ист Лайн) is an airport infrastructure business in Russia. It operates Domodedovo International Airport near Moscow, although the runways are controlled by the state.

== Overview ==
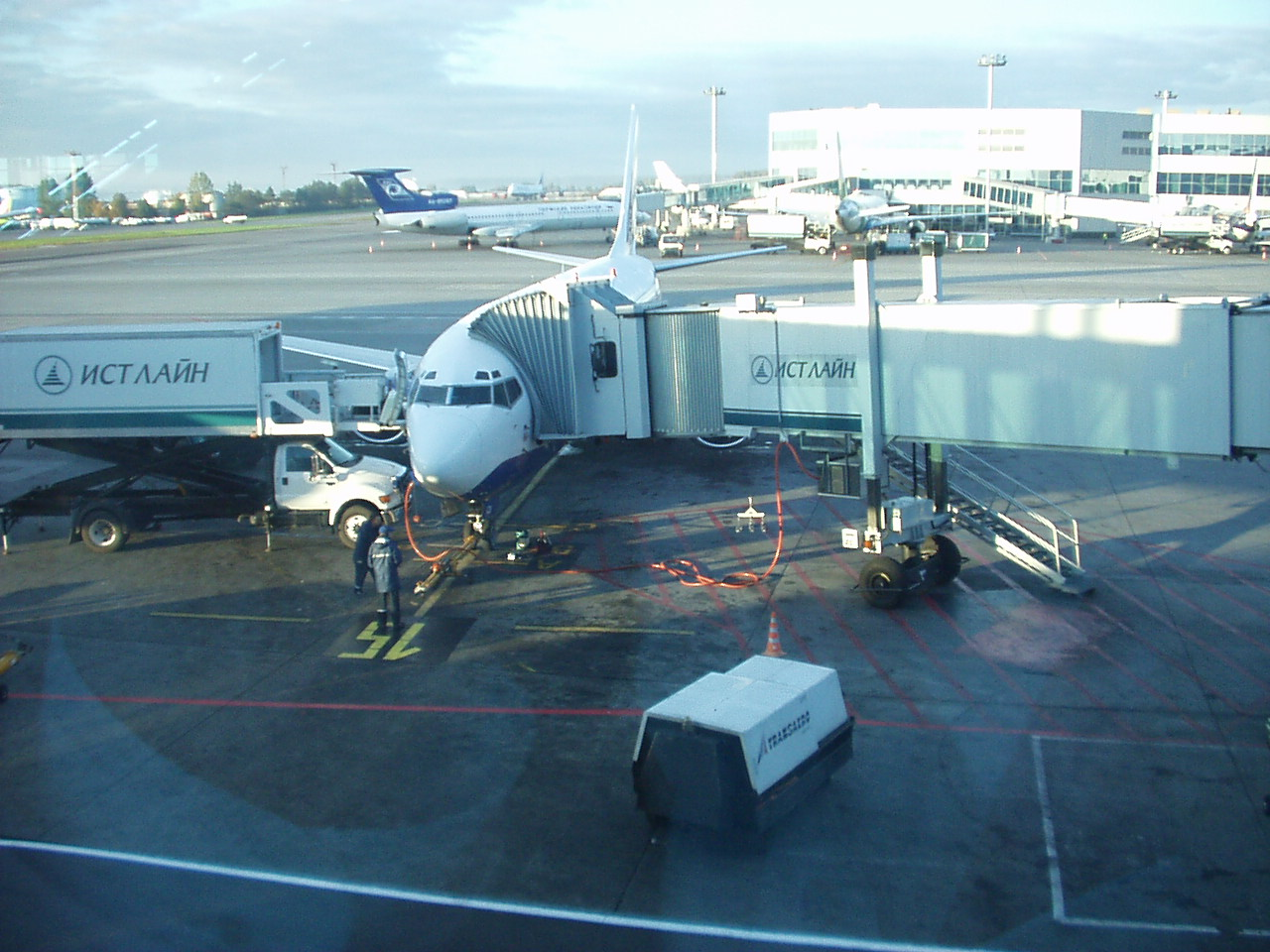
East Line Group's truck and jet bridge

East Line was founded in 1992 as a cargo agent and freight forwarding business; after gaining control of Domodedovo airport it reduced fees and improved ground transport to attract customers.

In 1993–1994, East Line Group, founded by Urals entrepreneurs Anton Bakov and Dmitry Kamenschik, who built capital in the early 1990s on hauling cargo from Asian countries to Russia, invested in several facilities at Domodedovo, including a new customs terminal and catering services.

In December 2010, East Line displaced director Vyacheslav Nekrasov, following disruption at Domodedovo caused by electrical problems and severe winter weather.

East Line has recently reconstructed more airport facilities, and has continued to attract more passengers and more airlines. Domodedovo is now the busiest airport in Russia; there are plans to construct a third runway. Double-level passenger bridges were installed in May 2012, to support the Airbus A380 which will be used on some Emirates flights to Domodedovo.

Domodedovo's rivals, Sheremetyevo International Airport and Vnukovo International Airport, are state-owned.

== See also ==
- Sheremetyevo International Airport
- Domodedovo International Airport
- Vnukovo International Airport
- Transport in Russia
