= Monarchist Party of Russia =

Monarchist Party of Russia Монархическая партия России
- Leader: Anton Bakov
- Pretender to the Russian throne: Grand Duchess Maria Vladimirovna of Russia (regent until 2013); Karl Emich of Leiningen (Nicholas III)
- Founded: April 7, 2012
- Headquarters: 11th Building, Turgeneva Street, Yekaterinburg, Russia. 620075
- Membership: 12,000+ (2021)
- Ideology: Restoration of the Russian monarchy Constitutional monarchism Russian conservatism
- Political position: Right-wing
- Religion: Russian Orthodox Church
- International affiliation: Romanov Empire
- Colors: White; Blue

Party flag

Website
- www.monpartya.ru

The Monarchist Party of Russia (Russian: Монархическая партия Российской Федерации, romanized: Monarkhicheskaya partiya Rossiyskoy Federatsii) is a monarchist political party that was created in 2012 by prominent politician and businessman Anton Bakov, a former member of Russia's State Duma. It declares its aim as the restoration of the monarchy in the country, while transforming it into a modern constitutional one "with full accordance to democratic procedures and current laws", as well as promoting the monarchist conception among Russians and other people of the world.

== Founding and registration ==
The Monarchist Party's founding convention took place on April 7, 2012. Kommersant reported that 1,000 members joined up. The Russian Ministry of Justice registered and licensed the party in 2012. By February 2013, members had organized 47 regional offices, exceeding the necessary limit to participate in regional elections. The legal address of the party is in Kosulino, a village near the city of Yekaterinburg. (The execution of the Romanov family took place in Yekaterinburg, where Bakov lives.) Bakov established the Monarchist Party as a part of his "Russian Empire" project —a micronation claiming to be the successor to the former Russian Empire founded by Peter the Great, and pretending to the overseas territories discovered by Russian sailors but not included in the original empire's successor states—such as Suwarrow atoll in the South Pacific, Antarctica and others.

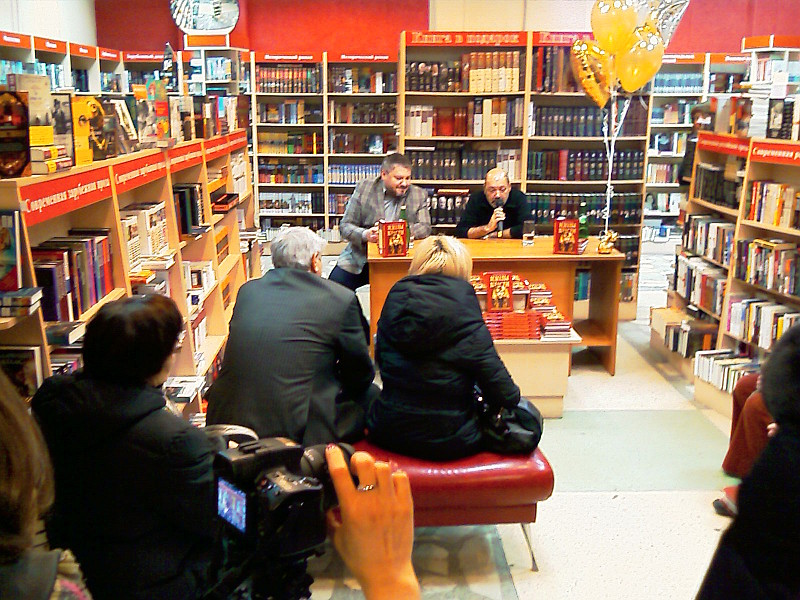
Anton Bakov and writer Andrey Matveev present their book "Idols of power", which explains their modern monarchist conception for Russia.

== Attitude ==
The main declared goals for the party are the promotion of the monarchical idea and the union of Russian monarchists in Russia and abroad. Bakov lists the party's goals as "proposing a successor to [the] Throne; proclaiming a political program affordable for Monarchism in the 21st century; and maintaining a proper propaganda to outline the benefits of [a] monarchy, in particular, we have to carefully explain people why Vladimir Putin is not a monarch." He describes the need for a constitutional monarchy: "We cannot restore monarchic Autocracy, as it was with the Romanovs, and don't need to. We can only have Constitutional Monarchy. This way we can separate the irrational from the rational. On the one side, we will have a Monarch, who won't have absolute power. On the other, we will have responsible Government, reporting to society; and a Parliament. This way we can keep ourselves from a dictatorship."

At the beginning of 2013, Bakov and writer Andrey Matveyev presented their book Idols of Power: from Cheops to Putin. In the book, the authors claim that they found power in the modern Russian Federation and in the former Soviet Union to be the result of the reconstruction of an ancient pagan cult, and monarchy gives them the only constructive direction for Russian politics to move in. In Bakov's words, the work on this book, where they were studying the nature of power and summarizing their political experience, led them to these conclusions and resulted in the creation of the party. Bakov describes the party as being different from other parties because: "The fundamental characteristic of the Monarchist Party -what makes us different from all others - is that we are not a democratic party. We support monarchical governance, not republican. Nowadays, most Russians have liberal doctrines installed in their minds that state that a person is master of his destiny, that people can elect power that will accomplish all what it is told to. This is the myth of the 99%. Our Party tries to expose that".

In June 2013, the party announced its candidate for the throne: it proclaimed the German Prince Karl Emich of Leiningen who also descends from the House of Romanov and, it is claimed, recently converted to Orthodox Christianity, together with his wife, and thus became a Successor, accepting the Orthodox name Nikolai Kirillovich or Emperor Nicholas III and his wife becoming Ekaterina Fedorovna. The succession configuration is set up by pre-Revolution Fundamental Laws of the Russian Empire, and the party announced Nikolai Kirillovich as the legal claimant, in accordance with them. Among Russian monarchists, this attitude is called "Legitimist" and "Cyrillist"—after Cyril Vladimirovich, Grand Duke of Russia, Karl Emich's great-grandfather, and cousin of Nicholas II, who created the Imperial House in emigration, and in 1924 proclaimed himself "Emperor in Exile", and died in 1938 (Bakov believes he was killed).

In early 2016 Bakov announced the Monarchist Party plans to organize a public trial for Lenin and Stalin, accusing them of killing millions of Russians and thus significantly slowing down the normal evolution of society and state.

=== Nicholas III and sovereign state Imperial See ===
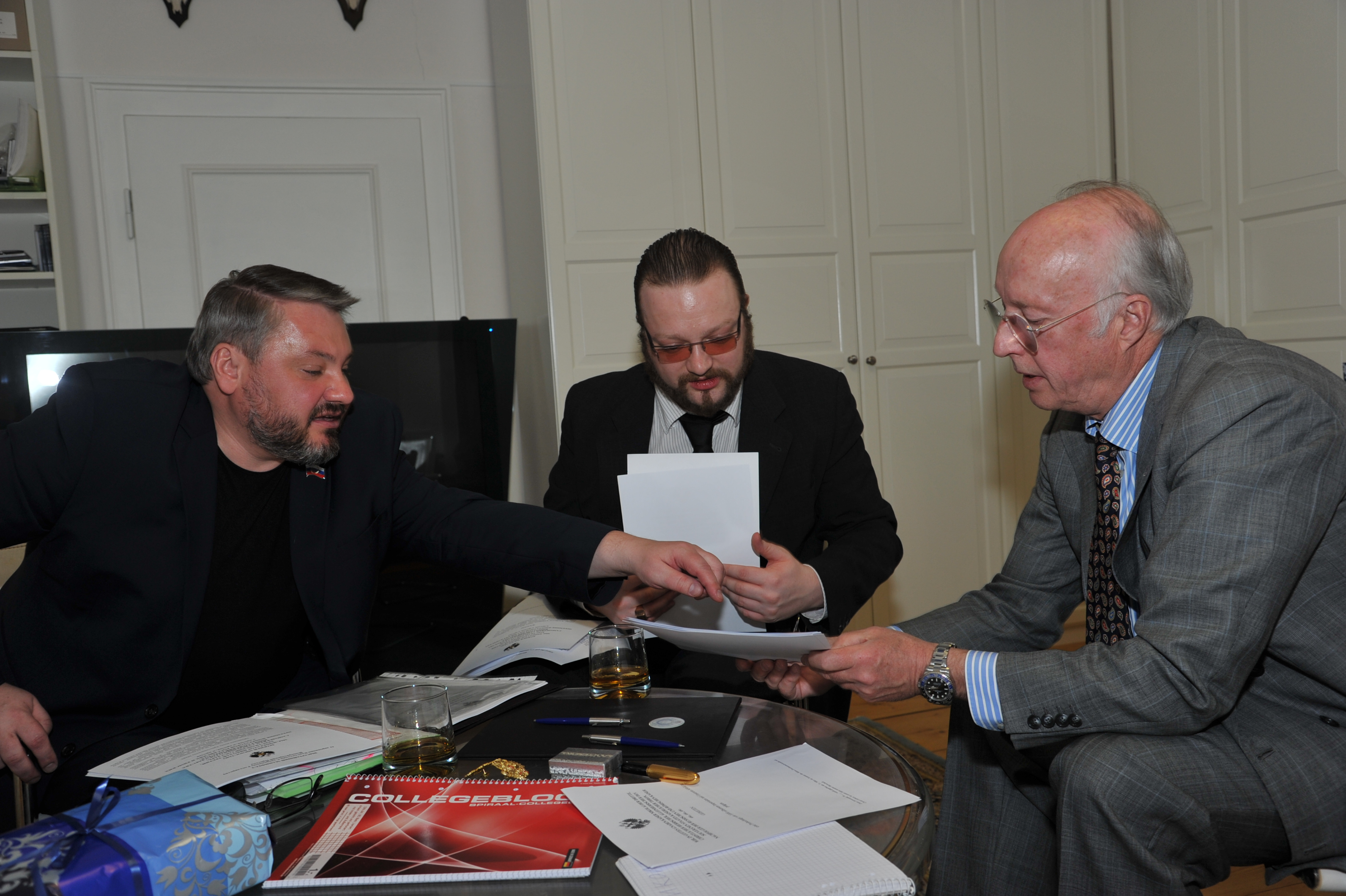
Anton Bakov and Karl Emich signing founding documents.

In early 2014, Bakov announced he views the Russian Throne (See), from the point of international law, as matters of state sovereignty (regardless of any other attributes, referring to analogues with The Holy See). He outlined that Karl Emich, upon accepting the Orthodox religion, received the right to take up this See according to the pre-Revolution Fundamental Laws of the Russian Empire. Bakov proposed that the Prince should accept the Throne to form a new and independent state, and incorporate it into Bakov's promotional projects such as the Monarchist Party, virtual state of Russian Empire among others. In April 2014, Bakov and Karl Emich appeared in a newspaper report declaring the Prince accepted the proposals as well as the title of Emperor Nicholas III (successor to Nicholas II). In the report, Bakov emphasized that Karl Emich has been an entrepreneur for a long time, but that from now on, he is barred from performing all non-Throne related activity. The report contained a "Manifesto of granting the Constitution to the State", signed by Nicholas III, proclaiming the formation of the sovereign state "Imperial See" aimed at consolidating all the people around the world devoted to Christian Monarchism. The See in the documents is viewed as the legacy of the first-ever Christian Roman Imperial Throne of Constantine the Great, passed through the Byzantine Empire to the Russian Empire and the House of Romanov by religious procedures. Later Bakov announced that he had purchased a plot of land in Montenegro to give the new state a location (80 ha, "twice as big as Vatican"), and was in negotiations with Montenegro's authorities on the state's recognition. He also said that Russian President Vladimir Putin refused to grant such a plot in Yekaterinburg (Bakov's residence and place of 1918 Romanov assassination) in response to Karl Emich's request passed to Putin by Bakov, a former MP. In early 2015, as a follow-up to the international sanctions during the Russo-Ukrainian War, Bakov told the press there are talks with Montenegro authorities to establish an offshore zone at this plot, aimed at providing financial intermediation to Russian companies. Also in early 2015, Imperial Throne representatives were in talks with the authorities of the neighboring Republic of Macedonia and Albania on possible collaboration and future state recognition. In particular, Bakov held a meeting with Macedonian Prime Minister Nikola Gruevski. Later there were the also talks with then President of Gambia Yahya Jammeh at the 70th UN General Assembly session in USA. Also, talks were held with Macedonian and Montenegro Eastern Orthodox clergy — Bakov discussed the creation of churches associated with the Imperial Throne and proposed the canonization of Russian ancient ruler Ivan III and his wife Sophia Palaiologina. Talks with Gaston Browne, Prime Minister of Antigua and Barbuda, also took place, as well as extended talks with authorities of Gambia and Kiribati.

At the end of 2015, Nicholas III, commemorating Bakov's fiftieth birthday, granted Bakov the inheritable title of Serene Prince and presented him a Romanov family Eastern Orthodox icon depicting Saint Catherine, who is considered the Heavenly Patron of Yekaterinburg.

== Activities ==
=== Monarchist consolidation ===
On 1 February 2013 the party held a monarchist congress in Paris, France, where representatives of several Russian monarchist movements gathered to discuss further developments. The Presidium for the Russian Monarchist Movement was created, with representatives of monarchist organisations being invited to join. It is believed that such gatherings will continue in the future. The party has set up a status of "Imperial Dynasty Member" for people from House of Romanov, and offered a reward of 2,000 euros per month for those of them who claim for it "as a sign of respect to people who did many things for Russia, but their properties in Russia were stolen and relatives who left in Russia were killed". Creation of a "Monarchist Internationale" is the part of Bakov's electoral programme for the 2018 elections.

=== Memorials ===
The party proposes to set up a guard of honour at the Grand Ducal Burial Vault in St. Petersburg where Cyril Vladimirovich together with his spouse are buried, and to assign funds to finish the reconstruction of the complex. In May 2013 the party organized in Yekaterinburg the creation of a large portrait-monument dedicated to Empress Ekaterina I after whom the city is named. Ekaterina has not been memorialized in the city since the beginning of Soviet times, when the city was renamed Sverdlovsk. This monarchical event coincided with the 400th anniversary of Romanov House. Also discussed were plans for a memorial to Karl, Prince of Leiningen, who died in 1946 in Soviet captivity. He was the husband of Grand Duchess Maria Kirillovna and Prince Karl Emich's grandfather.

=== Objects of interest ===
In early 2013, the party founded the Imperial Palace Fund aimed at re-creating the three ancient imperial palaces in Moscow, St. Petersburg and Yekaterinburg (Podzorny Palace, Srednerogatsky Palace and Belovezhsky Palace). They are supposed to be re-built according to older blueprints not on their historical grounds but at locations suitable to attract tourists. It is also proposed that they be used as homes for descendants of the Romanovs on their visits to Russia, and for general popularization of monarchism. On September 4, 2013, the ceremonial cornerstone for the copy of Belovezhsky palace was laid near Yekatrinburg. The stone had been taken out from the ruins of the original palace in modern Białowieża, Poland.

The party, under the signature of Nikolai Kirillovich, has sent a letter to Vladimir Putin asking him to assign a plot of land in the city of Ekatrinburg to establish a "Vatican analogue"—a city-state called "All-Russian Imperial Throne" aimed also to attract tourists and to correct the primary image of the city as the place of Tsar family assassination.

=== Elections ===
The party participated in mayoral elections in Yekaterinburg on September 8, 2013. The candidate for mayor was Bakov's 22-year-old daughter Anastasia, a singer and actress living in Moscow who recently graduated from Boris Shchukin Theatre Institute. She campaigned using references to the city authorities' performance and to God (who is the keeper of monarchy and protector of the people). Also there, 57 students ran as the party's candidates in elections to the City Duma.

In 2015 Bakov announced the Party's plans to run for the upcoming 2016 Russian State Duma elections. In early 2016 in an interview with RBC news agency, he confirmed this intention and stated that Anastasia would again become the front person of the planned campaign, and he personally would not run. However, the party did not end up participating.

In September 2017 Bakov declared that he would participate in the upcoming 2018 Russian presidential election, being nominated by the Monarchist Party. In the following months Bakov had collected the necessary citizen signatures, submitted documents to the Election Commission, and finally in January 2018 withdrew his candidature due to his double citizenship—Russian Federation and Romanov Empire (double citizenship is not allowed for participants).

In July 2018 Monarchist Party announced it is going to nominate Bakov's son Ilya, a real estate entrepreneur, as a candidate for 2018 Moscow mayoral election. Ilya Bakov gave a press conference announcing his plans to create an offshore zone in Moscow to attract foreign investment, and to create a federal ministry of Moscow affairs.

==== Electoral status ====
In 2019, the Ministry of Justice of the Russian Federation announced the liquidation of a number of political parties, citing federal law that requires parties to participate in elections within seven years of their establishment. Although it did not take immediate legal effect, the Supreme Court of the Russian Federation recommended that the Monarchist Party, along with several other political parties be liquidated given their lack of electoral participation. In accordance to the plan, individuals from the parties would be scrutinized in the following year. In February 2020, the regional branch of the party in Omsk Oblast was liquidated; while the regional branch of the party in Kostroma Oblast were formally excluded from the register of parties for the election of their regional parliament in June 2020.

=== Yekaterinburg Senate ===
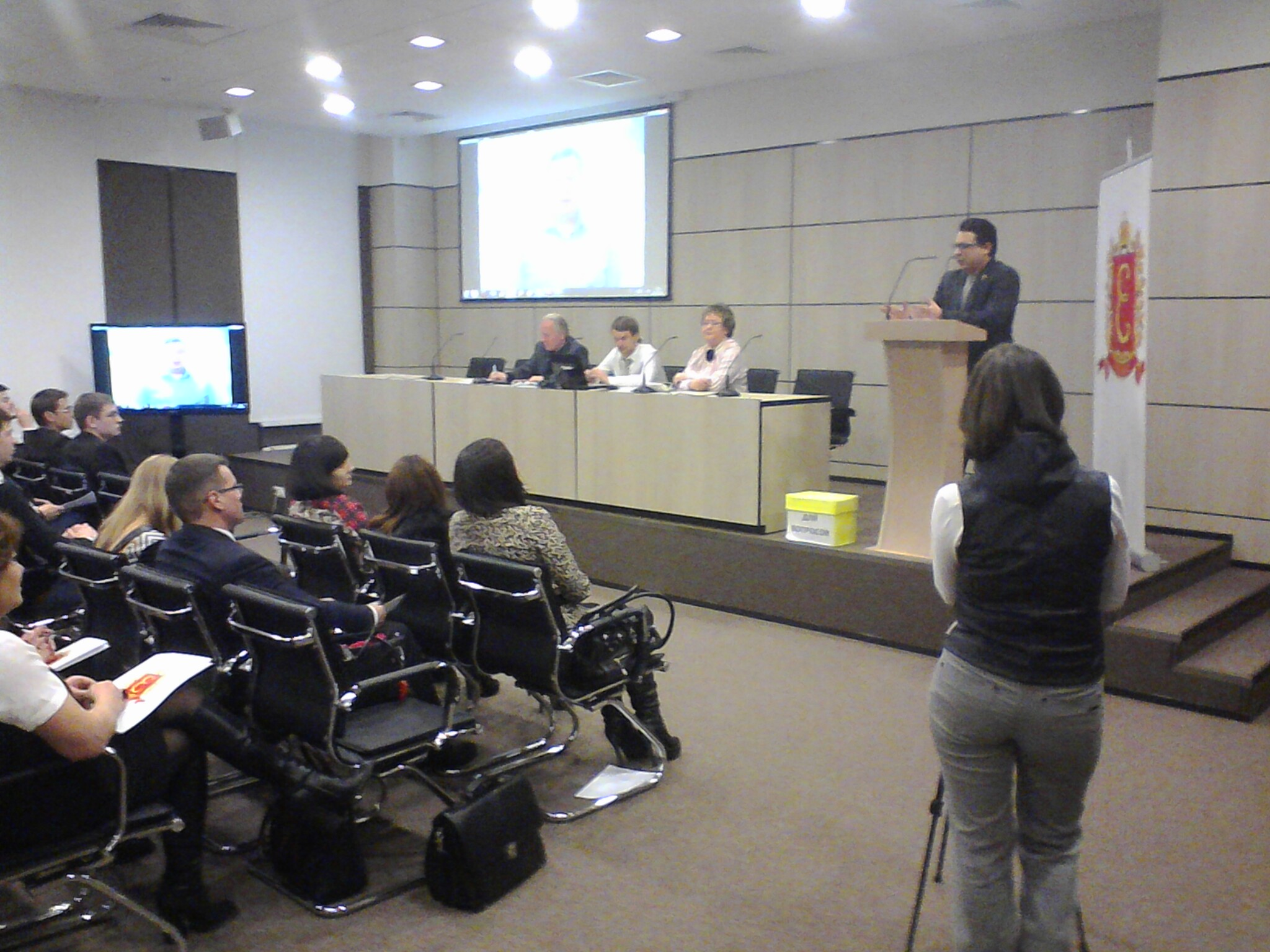
Yekaterinburg Senate session, senator Kirill Formanchuk talks about traffic issues.

The Yekaterinburg Senate is an unofficial, independent civil body organized by Bakov aimed to provide social control for official Yekaterinburg authorities such as the City Duma (Council). It was created shortly after the 2013 elections. So far, six sessions have been held, where several infrastructure and social projects were presented (some included direct interaction with officials). Up to 100 volunteer "senators" are active at these sessions (such as Kirill Formanchuk). Bakov has announced plans to form similar senates in other Russian cities as well as in the Imperial See.
