= Kirill Minovalov =

Russian businessman (born 1971)

- Born: Кирилл Вадимович Миновалов; April 22, 1971 (age 54); Moscow, USSR
- Citizenship: Russia
- Education: Moscow Institute for Railway Engineering
- Known for: Founder of Avangard Bank and Avangard Malz

Kirill Vadimovich Minovalov (Russian: Кирилл Вадимович Миновалов, also Cyril Minovalov; born April 22, 1971, Moscow, Soviet Union) is a Russian businessman.

Kirill Minovalov graduated in Systems Engineering from Moscow Institute for Railway Engineering in 1993, entering the industry during Russia's economic reforms in the early 1990s. In 1994, he founded the bank Avangard, where he is still its president and core shareholder. In 2006, he bought the assets of the bankrupt company Weissheimer Malz and created the malting company Avangard Malz. According to Forbes, Minovalov is the 132nd richest person in Russia. In 2019 he had assets 850 million dollars.

On September 19, 2011, luxury vehicles knocked down and killed four Moldovan workers on the road to Domodedovo International Airport. According to activists of the Blue Buckets movement, Kirill Minovalov was a passenger in the cortege.
