= Kirill Formanchuk =

Russian activist for motorists' rights

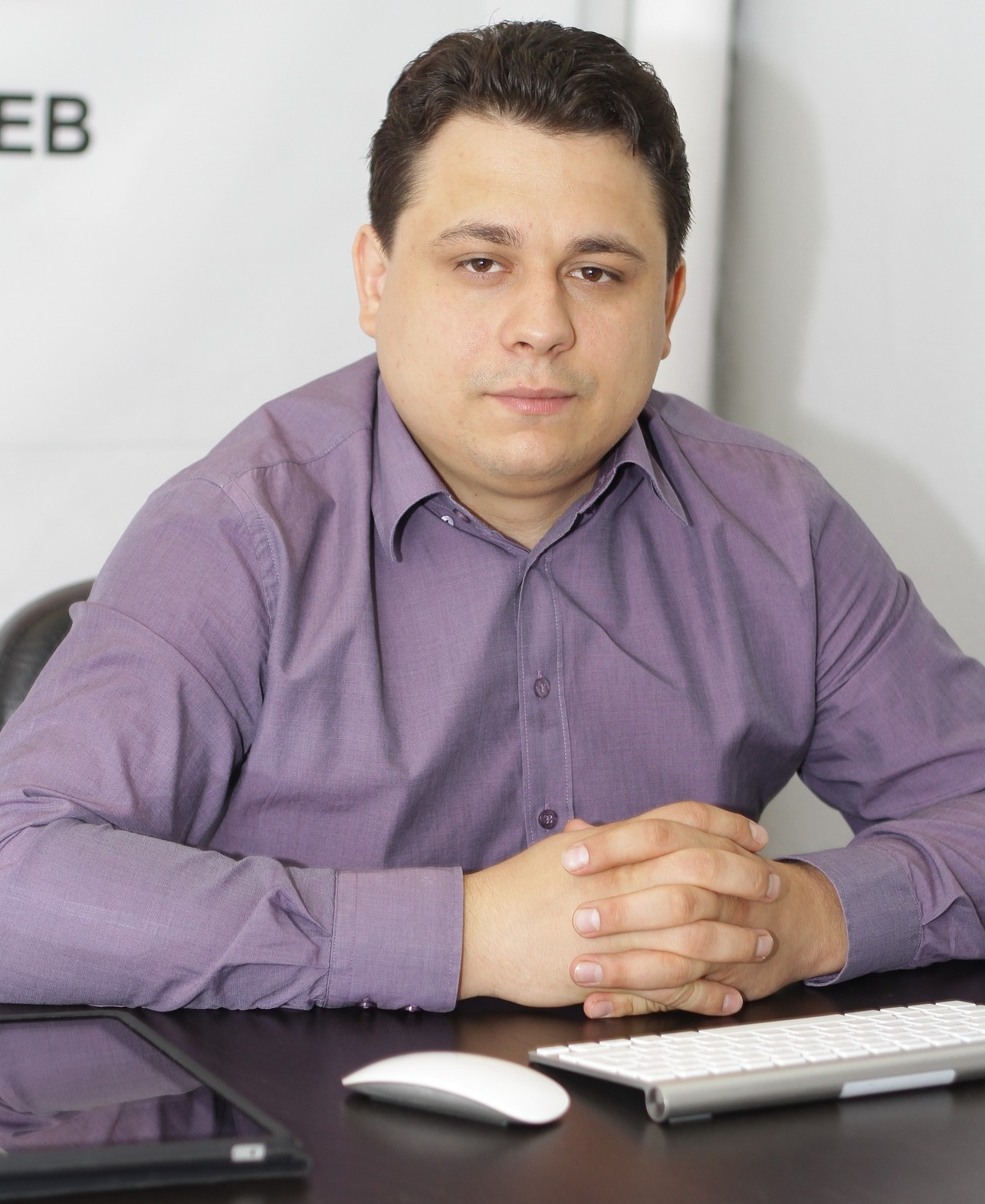
Formanchuk in his Federation of Russian Car Owners office

Kirill Formanchuk (born 25 August 1983) is an activist for motorists' rights in Yekaterinburg, Russia. On October 12, 2007, he suffered severe injuries from a beating while in police custody, which has led to increased public and media scrutiny of traffic police in a number of Russian cities.

He was a member of the Committee to Protect the Rights of Motorists, an activist group. He was previously employed by the Yekaterinburg municipal government.

== Early activism ==
Prior to the attack, Formanchuk had achieved local notoriety by challenging the lawfulness of traffic patrol stops, which are widely perceived in Russia to be corrupt and motivated by a desire for bribes. Formanchuk repeatedly refused to bribe traffic patrol officers, instead challenging them on their knowledge of traffic regulations and other laws governing traffic stops. In 2006, Formanchuk became one of the first Russian drivers to use a "Blue Bucket"-like installation atop of a car to challenge road police.

=== Beating ===
According to Formanchuk, he went to a police station on October 12, 2007 to register his car. He attempted to record video of his interaction with the officers, which he says infuriated them. He was subsequently attacked. Formanchuk did not positively identify his attackers as police officers, but he alleges that officers on duty did nothing to restrain the attackers.

The police allege that Formanchuk became belligerent in the police station, was arrested, and suffered his injuries when he instigated a fight with the other occupants of his jail cell.

Formanchuk was hospitalized after the attack, which caused injuries to his skull and brain.

=== Response ===
After Formanchuk's beating became public, motorists' groups in Yekaterinburg, St. Petersburg, and Moscow held demonstrations against the police. An Internet posting in support of Formanchuk has received over 200,000 hits. State-run media, which is usually reluctant to air criticism of government authorities, has begun to focus on Formanchuk's story, with one channel referring to his treatment as "outrageous."

The Yekaterinburg edition of Rossiyskaya Gazeta, the official government newspaper, cited Formanchuk's situation while admonishing law enforcement services to be more cooperative with motorists.

Law enforcement officials denied any involvement with Formanchuk's beating and accused Formanchuk's activist group of inciting the public against the police. They further alleged that Formanchuk is a draft dodger with many serious traffic violations.

== Later developments in activism ==
Formanchuk has founded the Committee to Protect the Rights of Motorists (Russian: КЗПА) and opened its offices in Ekaterinburg, Saint Petersburg and Moscow.

=== Ekaterinburg Senate ===
Formanchuk acted as a senator in civil Ekaterinburg Senate aimed at providing public control for official authorities. He focuses on automobile-related affairs.
