= Ural franc =

1991 scrip issued in Sverdlovsk

A stamp on a Ural franc. A full banknote can be seen here and here.

The Ural franc (Уральский франк) was a scrip issued in Sverdlovsk (Yekaterinburg) in Russia in 1991 by a team of businessmen and politicians headed by Anton Bakov.

In the 1990s the former USSR structures were collapsing and undergoing large-scale transformations and stresses. In 1991 the future of Russian state was uncertain and an idea for separate money was reasonable to maintain local economics, but was never implemented.

In 1993 there was a short-lived project of Ural Republic at the same area. Nowadays it is widely thought that francs were made for it. It is denied by involved people, primarily Bakov who participated in both: separate currency other than Russian Ruble was generally illegal by that time.

But the banknotes were later used as money substitute in 1997–2000 at the "city-forming" Serov Metallurgical Plant in the northern Sverdlovsk Oblast's town of Serov, where Bakov served as director.

The notes, all 145 × 80 mm, came in denominations of 1, 5, 10, 20, 50, 100, 500 and 1000 francs (франков). They were made according to sketches by architect Sophia Demidova at the Goznak factory in Perm city. Nowadays they have numismatic value and are exhibited in museums.

2021 silver coins

In 2021, to mark Ural franc's 30th anniversary, its creator Anton Bakov issued a silver coin also called Ural franc. 500 coins were issued weighing 20 grams each. They are supposed to be of interest for numismatics and are not intended to be launched as money as this is illegal in Russia. However, Bakov has assigned them a cryptocurrency status within the Binance blockchain network with the token Uralfranc and declared that he might issue more coins if there is a demand. The coin features a hand-drawn portrait of Bogdashko Toporok, a supposed 17th century ancestor of Bakov.
