= Victory Square, Saint Petersburg =

Square in St. Petersburg

Coordinates: 59°50′33.7″N 30°19′18.8″E

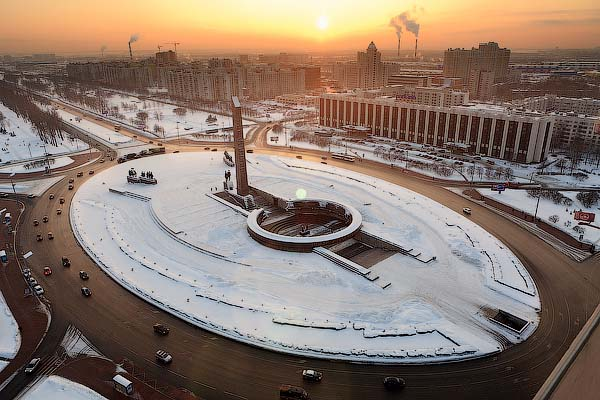
General modern view

Victory Square (Russian: Пло́щадь Побе́ды, Ploschad Pobedy) is a city square in the south of Saint Petersburg, Russia, named after the Soviet victory in the Great Patriotic War. It is located in the very end of Moskovsky Prospekt avenue 8 km from the city's primary Pulkovo Airport – not in the central part of the city, despite this name being common in the former Soviet cities as a central city square. The nearest metro station is Moskovskaya. The thoroughfare with the solemn ensemble of the square is the southern entrance to the city for the automotive traffic from internal Russia with its older and current capital Moscow, after which the avenue, the city district and the next square are named, and for the passengers arriving from the airport.

Victory Square is home to the Monument to the Heroic Defenders of Leningrad, which commemorates the victims and survivors of the Siege of Leningrad. The monument, designed by Sergey Speranskiy and Valentin Kamenskiy, and sculpted by Mikhail Anikushin, was erected in 1975 to coincide with the 30th anniversary of the end of the war. It consists of a 48–metre high obelisk, a large circular enclosure, and a subterranean Memorial Hall.

In the past, at this location there was a center of a settlement called Srednyaya Rogatka named after a Russian Empire-time security checkpoint (comparable functionality to a city gate) and road crossing. Until 1971, the royal Srednerogatsky Palace was also located here.

== Gallery ==
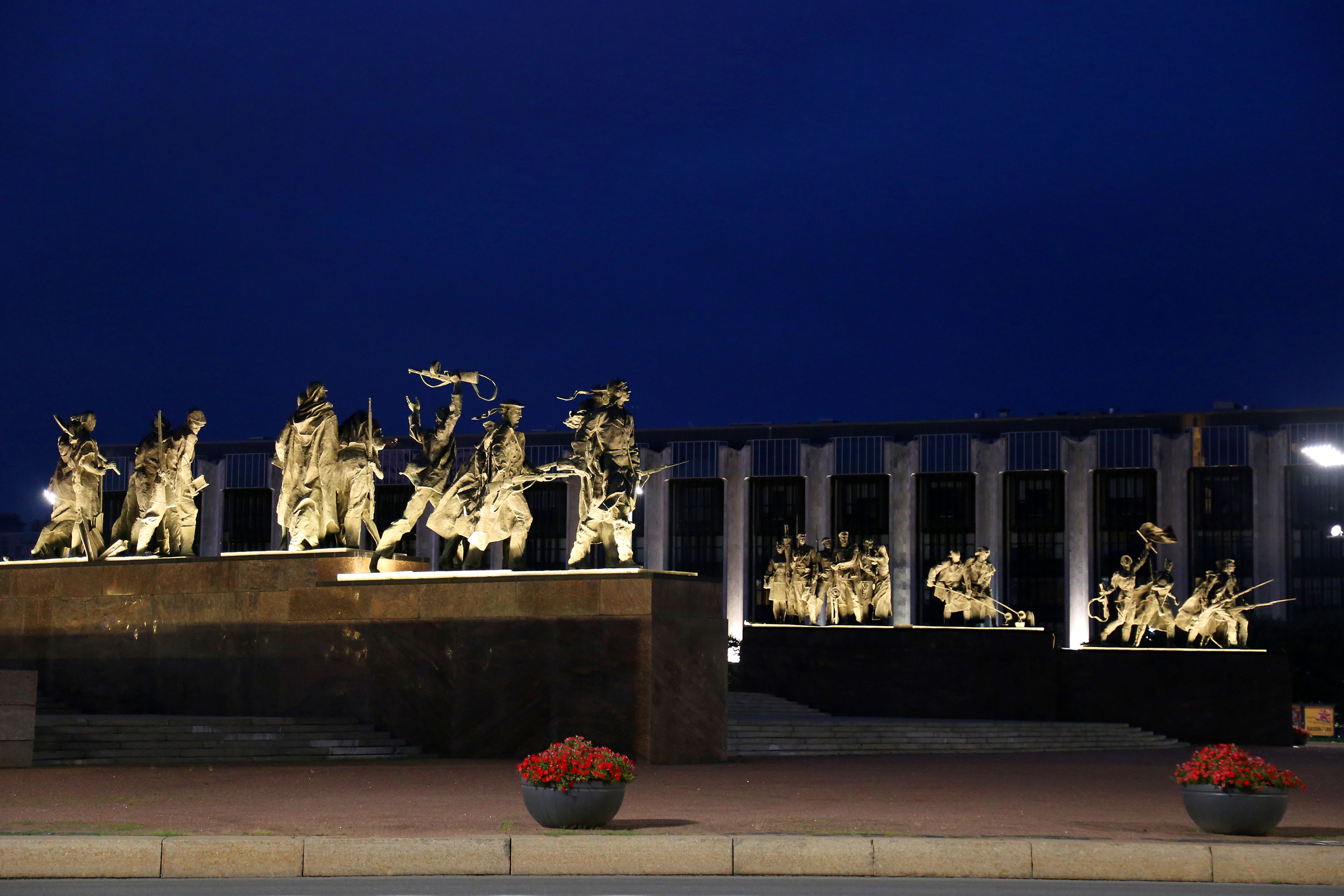
Monument Geroicheskim Zashchitnikam Leningrada, Gosudarstvennyy Muzey Istorii Sankt-Peterburga, Saint Petersburg, Russia

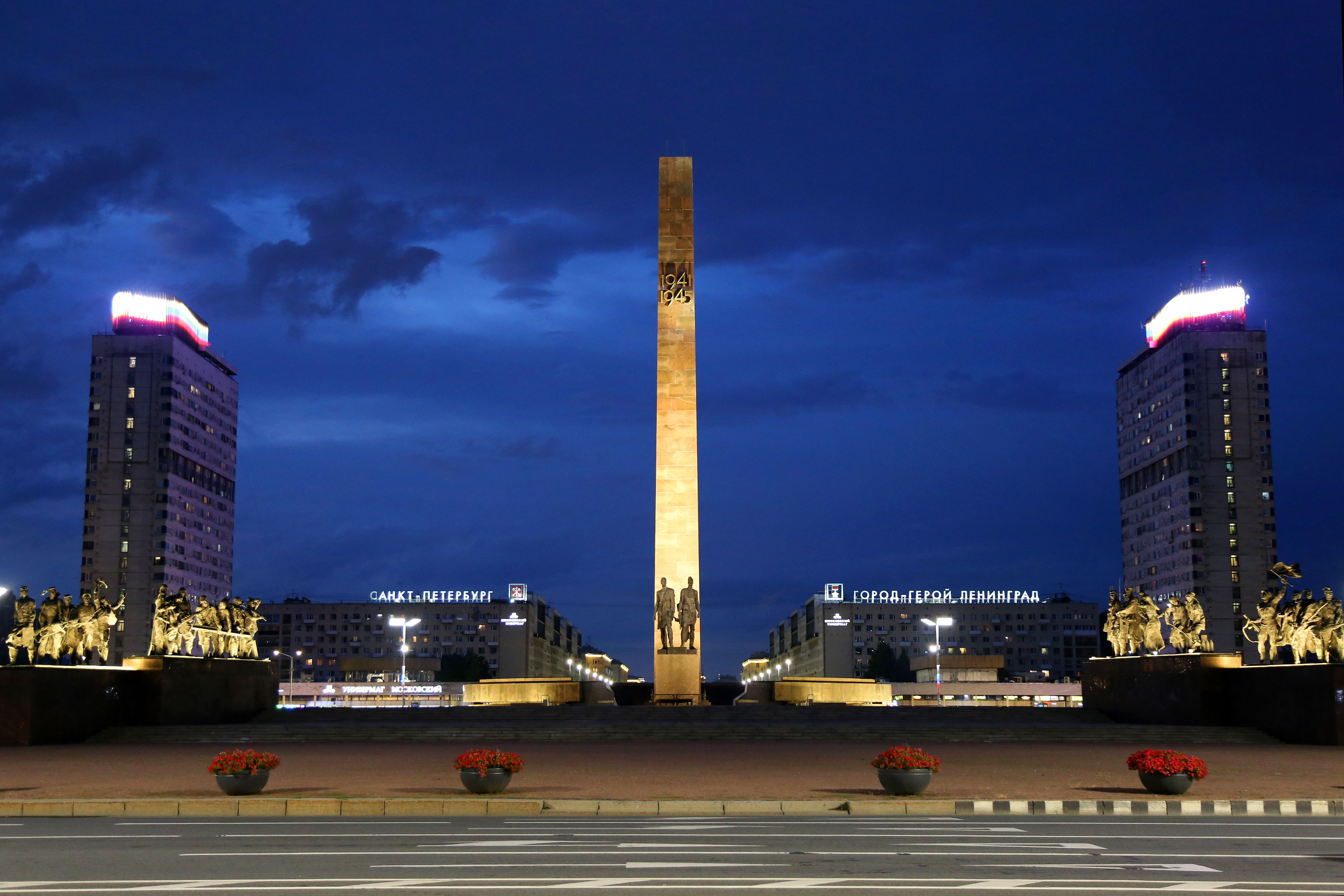
Monument Geroicheskim Zashchitnikam Leningrada, Gosudarstvennyy Muzey Istorii Sankt-Peterburga, Saint Petersburg, Russia

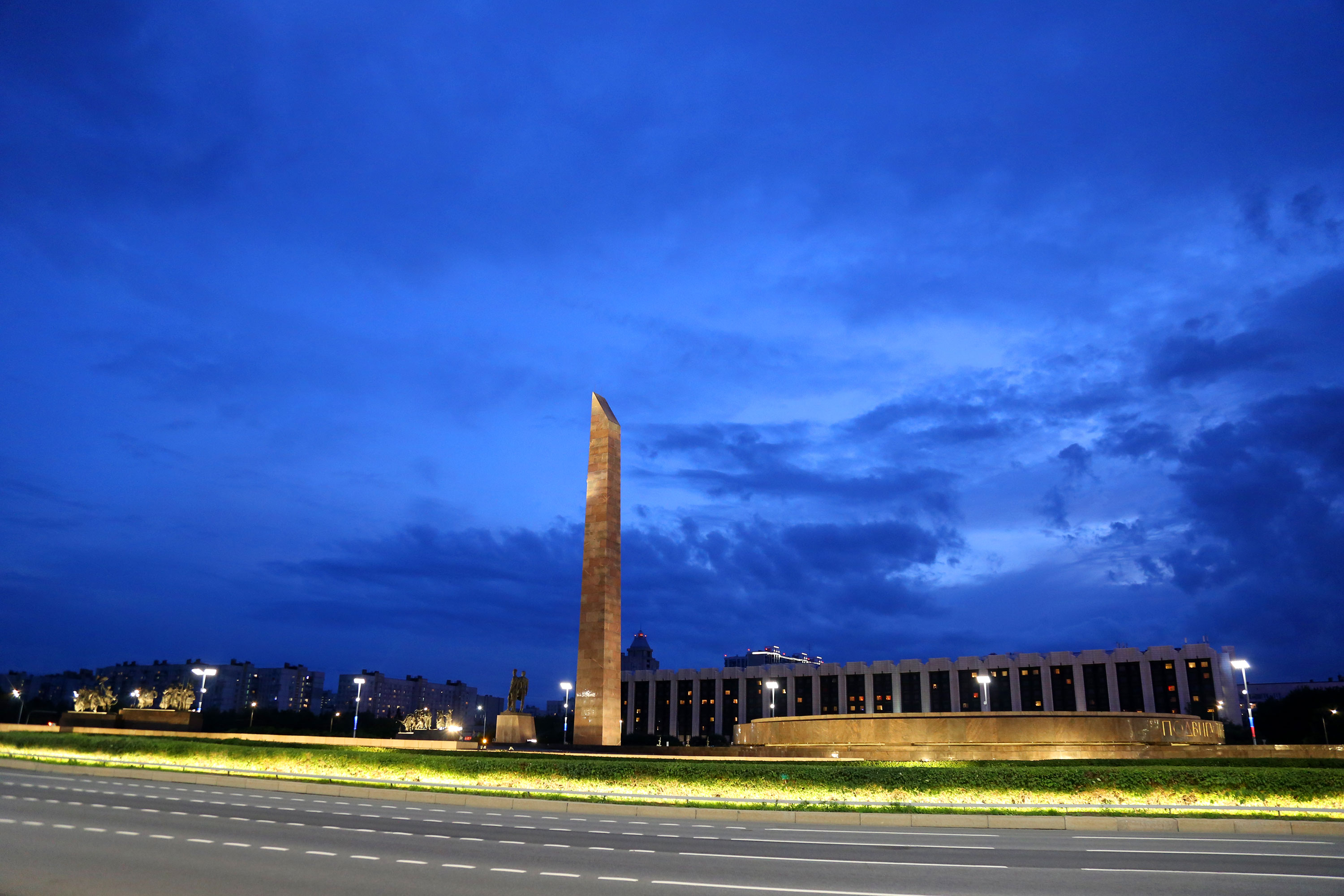
Monument Geroicheskim Zashchitnikam Leningrada, Gosudarstvennyy Muzey Istorii Sankt-Peterburga, Saint Petersburg, Russia

== See also ==
- List of squares in Saint Petersburg
