= Anton Bakov =

Russian politician

- Антон Баков
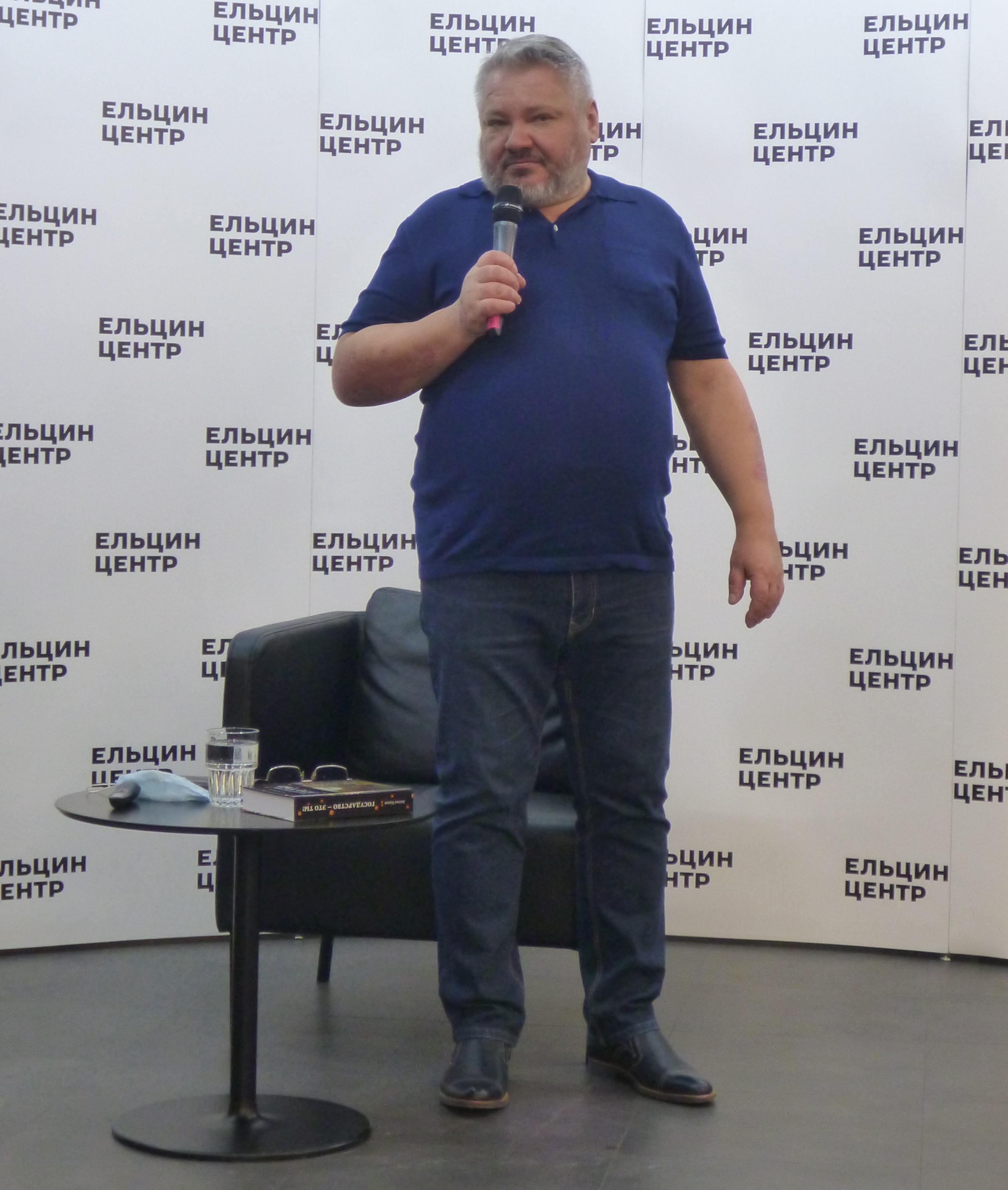
- Bakov in 2021

Archchancellor of the Romanov Empire (Micronation)
- Incumbent
- Assumed office April 2014
- Monarch: Nicholas III

Prime Minister of the Romanov Empire (Micronation)
- Incumbent
- Assumed office July 2011

Chairman of the Monarchist Party
- Incumbent
- Assumed office April 2012

Personal details
- Born: Anton Alekseyevich Bakov; 29 December 1965 (age 60) Sverdlovsk, Russian SFSR, Soviet Union
- Spouse: Marina Bakova
- Occupation: Businessman, politician

Anton Alekseyevich Bakov (Russian: Антон Алексеевич Баков; born 29 December 1965) is a Russian businessman, monarchist politician, traveler, writer and human rights activist. He is the chairman of the Russian Monarchist Party, was a member of the 4th convocation of the State Duma of Russia from 2003 to 2007 and was a candidate at 2018 Russian presidential election. Due to being known for a long series of unusual political projects such as Ural franc, the writer Alexei Ivanov coined him a "political Leonardo".

Bakov claims to have restored the Russian Empire through his establishment of the micronation of the Imperial Throne in 2011. In 2014, the Imperial Throne issued a manifesto announcing that royal Romanov family heir, German Prince Karl Emich of Leiningen had succeeded Nicholas II and is now Emperor Nicholas III. In 2017, the micronation was re-branded into Romanov Empire. Under this regime, Bakov holds the position of Archchancellor and bears the title of "His Serene Highness Prince" (Knyaz).

== Biography ==
Bakov was born on 29 December 1965 in Sverdlovsk, (now Yekaterinburg) in a family of engineers who worked at the Uralmash machine building plant. He tells there are seven generations of Russian Orthodox priests in his ancestry.

He graduated from the Ural Polytechnic Institute (now the Ural State Technical University) in 1988. He was a Lenin grant-aided student and graduated with honours. While a student he became an activist in the anti-communist movement. He organized several political activities including the public boycott of uncontested elections to the Supreme Soviet of the Soviet Union in 1984, the founding of a public movement aimed at re-opening churches closed down by the communists and the saving of the memorials of national history in Verkhoturye in 1987. In 1988, he also initiated the removal of the plates with the names of Joseph Stalin's NKVD executioners from city streets. Since 1989, he hired and later supervised for about 10 years political activities of his close university-time friend Alexander Burkov, who later became a prominent politician and in 2018 became the governor of Omsk Oblast.

=== 1980s–90s ===
Bakov is one of the first legal businessmen in the USSR. In 1987, four months after the permission to set up first independent cooperative societies in the Soviet Union and while still at university, Bakov established the private tourist agency "Cedar", the first such agency in the country. In 1991 on the basis of this agency, he established the company "East Line" which involved in air cargo transfers between Europe and Asia and became the operating agent for Moscow Domodedovo Airport. Bakov invited Dmitry Kamenshchik to co-operate the company, and they managed the airport to receive international status in 1992. Bakov left the business in 1994, the airport grew up to become Russia's largest since then.

In 1994, Anton Bakov was elected a Serov county deputy of Sverdlovsk Oblast Parliament — Sverdlovsk Oblast Duma and the Chairman of the Duma Legislative Committee. His first actions as a deputy were aimed against the federal appointments of city mayors and regional governors. He and his like-minded team succeeded in holding the executive government elections in 1995–1996. At the same time Bakov created and supported the so-called Social Ambulance – a system of social control. In 1994 he became an active member of Duma's Chairman Eduard Rossel's team. He was a member of the pre-election committee for E. Rossel in 1995, who won the election.

Bakov participated in the Yekaterinburg mayor elections in 1995, and came second behind Arkady Chernetsky. In 1996 he was elected the vice-chairman of Sverdlovsk Regional Duma, and then was nominated for the post of the Governor of Kurgan region, but his candidature was not registered. In 1997–2000 Bakov became the General Director (CEO) of the city-forming enterprise — Serov Metallurgical Plant (9,000 employees). This experience became very important for his future career.

Anton Bakov is the author of the project of Ural franc—a scrip printed in 1991 for usage in early post-Soviet economical regional projects. It never was used in this way; but in 1997–2000 the banknotes were used as money substitute at Serov Metallurgical Plant to help to overcome the 1998 Russian financial crisis. Nowadays they have numismatic value and are exhibited at museums.

Bakov is also one of the creators of law base for the Ural Republic—a 1993 project to transform Sverdlovsk Oblast into republic which involved top Oblast officials and was stopped shortly after creation. As a chairman of Oblast Duma Law Committee, Bakov was working on Charter of the Oblast since 1992, in 1993 it was presented as a Constitution of the Ural Republic, and in 1994 the base of that text became the official Oblast Charter with recommendations to use it in other regions. Ural Republic is unrelated to Ural franc, as some suppose, because the Republic did not plan to establish its own currency. However, Bakov authored the Flag of the Republic.

=== 2000s ===
In 2000 Anton Bakov was elected to the House of Representatives (the upper chamber) of the Legislative Assembly of Sverdlovsk Oblast (from Serov single-mandate electoral district). He fought against corruption (organized "Anti-Mafia" public movement, which opposed the criminal organization "Uralmash gang") and against the propriety redistribution process. In order to increase the wellbeing of the population, Bakov was involved in educational activities, created consumer and credit cooperatives, councils of local public self-governing bodies and condominiums. As an MP, Bakov proposed to increase the size of the allowances for children and the introduction of regional additional payments to state pensions. Since 2002 Bakov has been engaged in buying land, and now is one of the largest landowners of the Urals. As a developer, Bakov actively started building country houses for sale. In addition, he is actively involved in political consulting. In recent years he specialized in the development of Internet, media and political social networks, including those which are aimed at mobilizing people to fight corruption.

In 2002 there was a scandal at 2002 Winter Olympics where Russian figure skater Irina Slutskaya was denied 1st place despite widespread professional opinions that she would win; particularly, Figure Skating Federation of Russia demanded a second gold medal for her. Anton Bakov at the time had ordered a custom copy of olympic gold medal completely made of gold (700 grams, while the genuine one contained only 6 grams) and personally awarded it to Slutskaya.

In 2003, Bakov participated in the elections of the Governor of Sverdlovsk region. He accused Eduard Rossel of having links with the criminal organization "Uralmash gang". In the second round Anton Bakov lost, gaining 330,000 votes against the more than 600,000 obtained by Eduard Rossel. In 2003 he was elected to the State Duma from single-mandate Serovskiy electoral district No. 167.

After the election, he joined the party "the Union of Right Forces". He supervised all the successful election campaigns of the party in all the regions, except for Chechnya, in 2004–2007. In December 2006, Bakov was elected the Secretary of the electoral work of the "Union of Right Forces". He is considered to be the one who proposed abandoning traditional right-wing party liberal rhetoric and populist slogans such as raising pensions and supporting the poor. Because of the defeat of the Union of Right Forces in the 2007 Russian legislative election and the abolition of single-mandate electoral districts, Anton Bakov did not get into the State Duma for the next term.

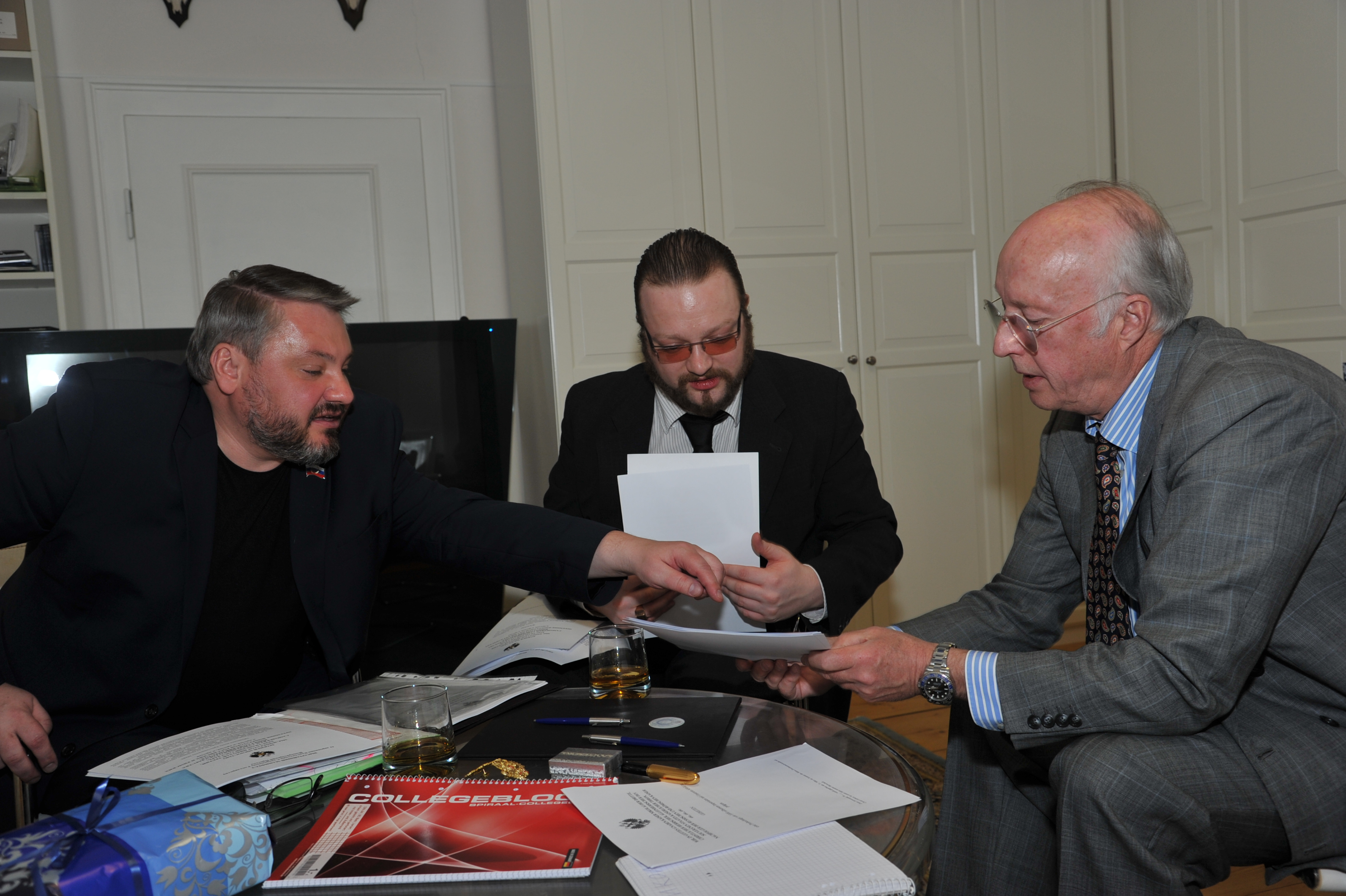
Anton Bakov and Prince Karl Emich of Leiningen signing founding documents for the Sovereign State Imperial See

=== 2010s ===
In 2010s Bakov concentrated on making business and authoring of books dedicated to politics and society. Nevertheless, he is episodically involved in political actions, sometimes involving his children. In 2017 he attempted to run for President of Russia at 2018 Russian presidential election (see below).

== Current projects ==
=== Russian Monarchist Party ===
Bakov's modern political project, established in 2012, is the Russian Monarchist Party which supports return of monarchy in Russia, ousted in 1917. In 2013 it was declared that German Prince Karl Emich of Leiningen, a direct royal Romanov family descendant, is now viewed as the primary heir to the Russian Throne upon his conversion from Lutheranism to Eastern Orthodox Christianity in Nuremberg on 1 June 2013. Monarchist Party participated in mayoral elections in Yekaterinburg on 8 September 2013. The candidate for mayor was Bakov's 22-year-old daughter Anastassia, a singer and actress living in Moscow who recently graduated from Boris Shchukin Theatre Institute. She campaigned using references to the city authorities' performance and to God (who is the keeper of monarchy and protector of the people). Also there, 57 students ran as the party's candidates for elections for City Duma.

In 2015 Bakov announced the Party's plans to run for the upcoming 2016 Russian State Duma elections. In early 2016 in an interview with RBK news agency, he confirmed this intention and stated that Anastasia would again become the front person of the planned campaign, and he personally would not run. However, the party did not end up participating.

In early 2016 Bakov had announced the Monarchist Party plans to organize a public trial for Lenin and Stalin, accusing them of killing millions of Russians and thus significantly slowing down the normal evolution of society and state.

==== 2018 presidential campaign ====
In fall 2017 Bakov started campaigning for the 2018 Russian presidential election, being nominated by the Monarchist Party. Creation of a "Monarchist Internationale" was the part of Bakov's electoral programme for the elections. Bakov withdrew his candidature on January 24, 2018, declaring that his second Romanov Empire citizenship officially prevents him from the run.

=== Nicholas III and The Romanov Empire ===
Coat of arms of the Imperial See

The Romanov Empire (Russian: Романовская Империя) is a state proposed by Bakov as a re-creation of the Russian Empire. It would be led by Romanov heir Prince Karl Emich of Leiningen as Emperor Nicholas III, with Bakov serving as Archchancellor. Bakov declared the new Russian Empire to be the successor to the historical Russian Empire that ceased to exist in 1917. Bakov declared himself prime minister and announced a constitution and state symbols. The empire began to issue its own passports online for 1,000 rubles (US$31), and by 2014 it claimed it had granted about 4,000 passports to citizens.

In June 2012, Bakov registered the Monarchist Party with the Russian Ministry of Justice, with the stated goal of restoring the monarchy to Russia in accordance with the law. It is the only legalised monarchist party in Russia. In July 2013, Bakov claimed his nation granted citizenship to Edward Snowden, who at the time was in Moscow Sheremetyevo Airport seeking amnesty in Russia. In the fall of 2013, Bakov's daughter Anastasia Bakova (Анастасия Бакова) was the Monarchist Party's candidate in the mayoral elections in Yekaterinburg.

Bakov has held discussions with a number of nations in attempts to purchase land and give the micronation territory under its control. As of 2017, talks with Kiribati and the Gambia were unsuccessful.

On 31 March 2014, under the new name of the Imperial Throne, the micronation issued a manifesto announcing itself a sovereign nation and declaring that Prince Karl Emich of Leiningen (born 1952) had become its head with the title of Nicholas III, Emperor of All Russia, as a successor to Nicholas II. After he was named Emperor, Nicholas III wrote a letter to Vladimir Putin requesting land in Yekaterinburg to establish a capital with its own imperial senate. The request was denied.

In 2020, Bakov declared that his new project, the successor to the Empire, entitled Arca Noë, is going to be based in neutral Mediterranean waters close to Venice as a part of the seasteading movement.

=== Yekaterinburg Senate ===
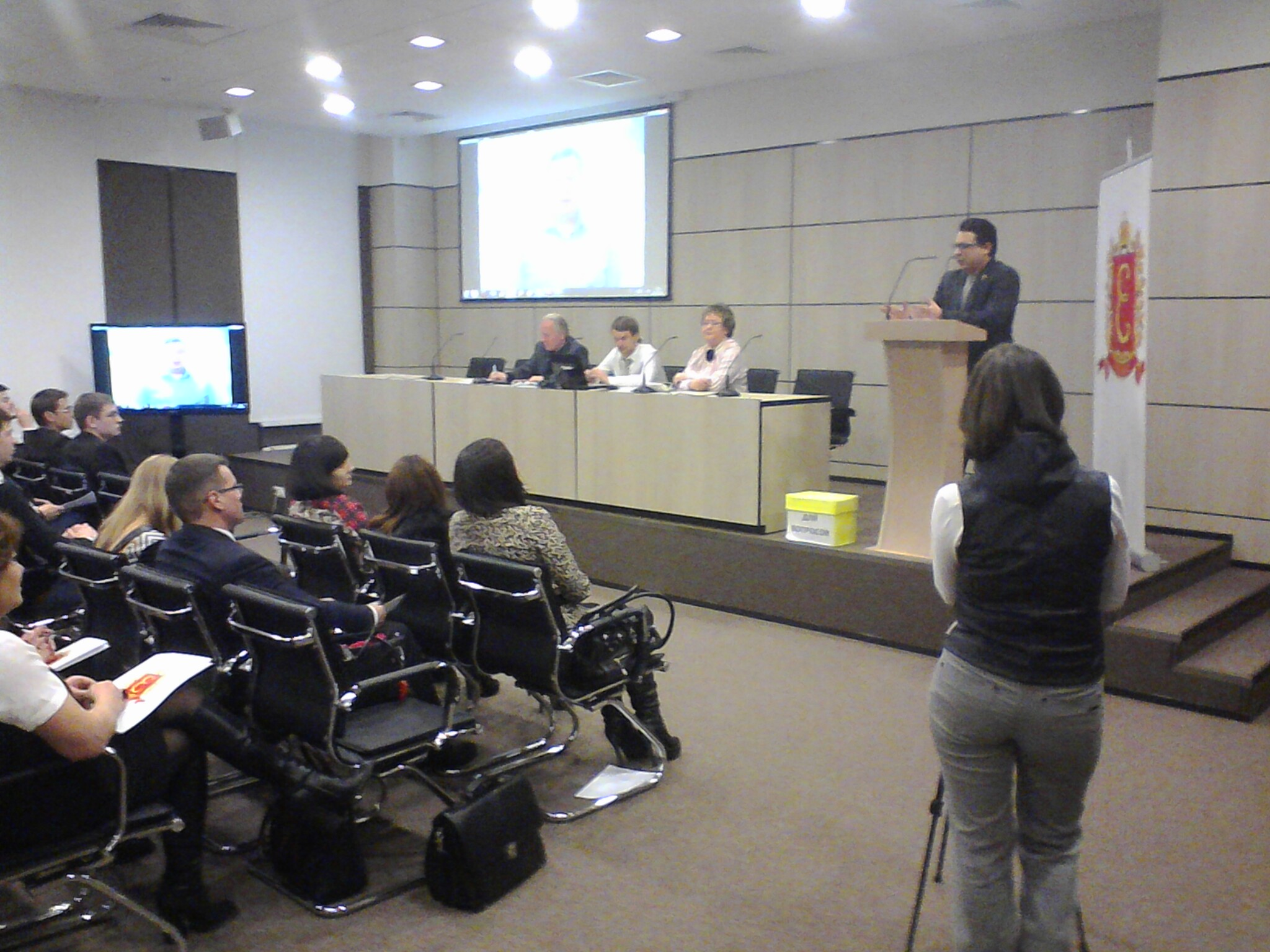
Yekaterinburg Senate session, senator Kirill Formanchuk talks about traffic issues.

The Yekaterinburg Senate is an independent civil governing body organized by Bakov aimed to provide social control for official Yekaterinburg authorities such as City Duma (Council). It was created shortly after 2013 elections. So far, 6 sessions were held where several infrastructure and social projects were presented, some included direct interaction with officials. Up to 100 volunteer "senators" are active at the sessions, such as Kirill Formanchuk. Bakov announces the scheme of a parliament with this Senate is supposed to be implemented in Romanov Empire when it's physically constructed. The Empire's supposed parliament is compared to resemble usual two-house parliament "turned upside-down" and based on demarchy.

=== Other activities ===
During 2010s, Bakov has published several books and scientific texts, mainly dedicated to his genealogy and history of the Urals.

In January 2025, he told the media that he had established an international organization, the "Union of Gaza Developers", and was negotiating to become one of the contractors for the reconstruction of the destroyed Gaza Strip.

Bakov holds a PhD and 20 patents.

== Books ==
- The Christian History of the Urals (1991)
- Civilizations of the Middle-earth (1995)
- Which Russia do I Serve (1999)
- Idols of Power: from Cheops to Putin (2013)
- 2014 Golden bull: Monarchist plan for Russian Renaissance (2014)
- Democracy Russian style: Notes of the former USSR citizen (2016, expected to be translated into English).
- The state is You! (2019)
- Uralic ancestors of the Bakovs, the Serene Highness Princes (2021)
- Triumph and collapse of Bryuzgins, the Kozelsk's textile kings (2022)

=== Bogdashka Toporok ===
In 2020 Bakov organized the creation of an illustrated book of pseudohistorical ironical tall tales about a real 17th-century peasant Bogdashko Toporok (a word-by-word diminutive of "Bogdan Topor", "Bogdan The Axe"), who turned out to be an ancestor of Bakov and many other modern people from Urals. Bakov discovered his identity while examining old Russian archives, but due to very little amount of documented information set the book up as a series of fictional stories exposing his own non-traditional view on those ages of Russian history. The author of the tales is journalist and historian Aleksandr Kirillov, the illustrations are by Maksim Smagin, known for works for "Krasnaya Burda" magazine. It was published under the title Bogdashka Toporok. Skazes (Russian: Богдашка Топорок. Сказы, ISBN 5990865430). Later books of 2021 and 2022 are dedicated to detailed research of biographies of his documented ancestors (all he could find in all possible archives). In the year 2023 a second book dedicated to Bogdashko was published, also authored by Kirillov and Smagin. They promised more of it. The portrait of Bogdashka Toporok is on the 2021 numismatic coins of Ural franc.

== Family ==
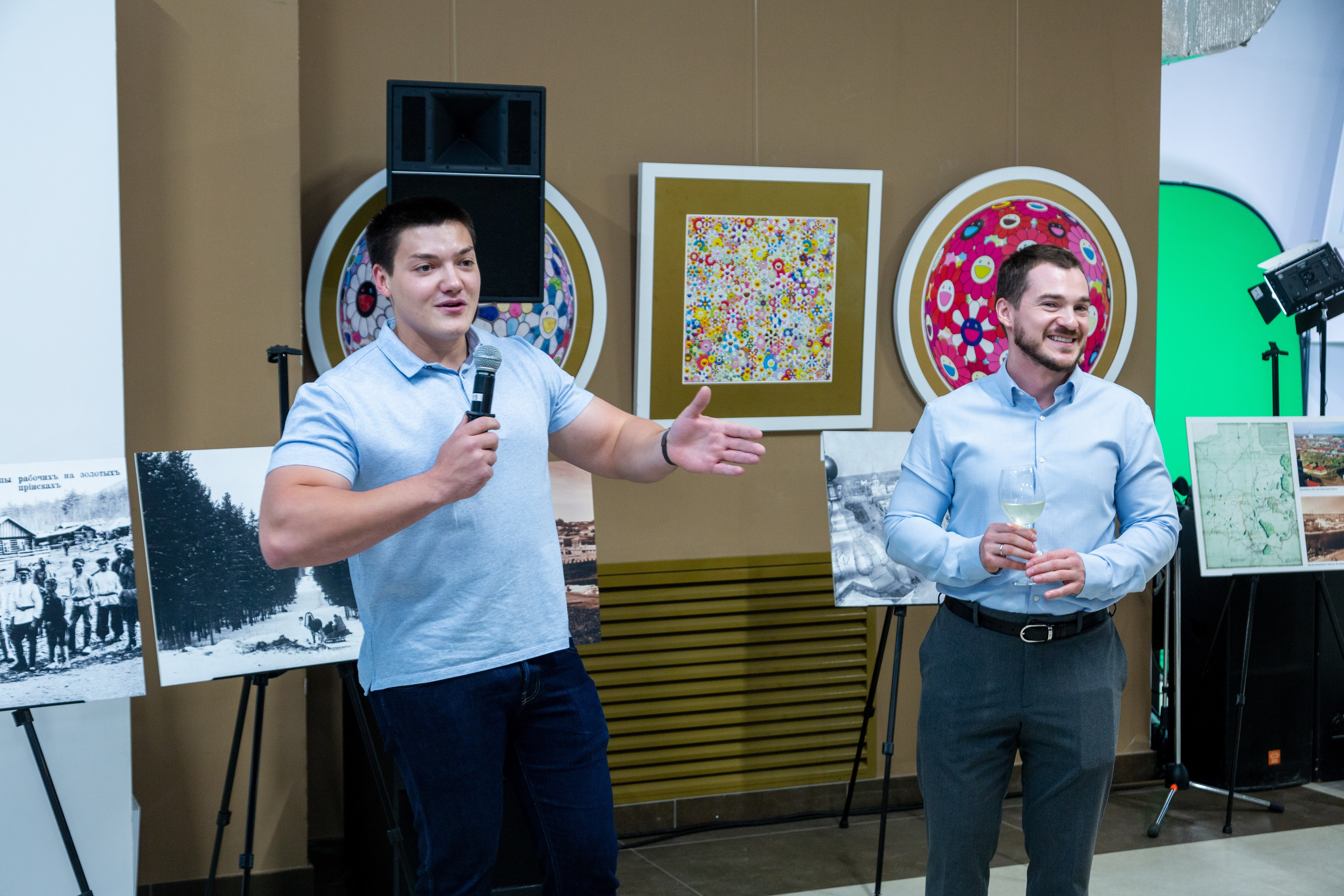
Anton Bakov's sons Mikhail and Ilya

Bakov is married and has four children and eight grandchildren. Bakov's children are considered erbprinzes within Romanov Empire grades.

The daughter Anastassia was a candidate for mayoral elections in Yekaterinburg in 2013. At the time she was a singer and actress who recently graduated from Boris Shchukin Theatre Institute, releasing several music videos and participating in award-winning movies. Anton Bakov's son Mikhail, an engineer, was a candidate for Yekaterinburg City Duma the same year.

The elder son Ilya Bakov (born 28 July, 1985) attempted to run for Moscow city mayor at 2018 Moscow mayoral election. His program proposed the creation of a special economic zone "German Quarter" (allusion to historical German Quarter) and a federal ministry for capital affairs. He withdrew from the race in July 2018 due to complexities in the registration process.

Ilya Bakov, together with his brother Mikhail, are listed as the inventors in several patents, including biometric identification systems and customer profiling technologies. Ilya Bakov is a land developer involved in suburban housing projects near Ekaterinburg who also organizes social development programs. One of them included assignation of commercial land for the needs of a local school in Urals which faced problems with capacity.

== See also ==
- Ural franc
