= Ural Republic =

1993 self-proclaimed federal subject of Russia

Coordinates: 54.5333°N 60.3333°E

Proposed flag of the Ural Republic.

The Ural Republic (Russian: Уральская Республика) was an unrecognized subject of the Russian Federation that existed from July 1, 1993 to November 9, 1993 within the boundaries of Sverdlovsk Oblast region of North Asia. It was formed as a result of a referendum held on April 12, 1993 by Eduard Rossel.

It was organized by a team of local politicians, of which one of them, Anton Bakov, is also the author of the project of a currency for the Republic, the Ural franc.

== History ==
Location of the Greater Ural Republic

- April 25 - An issue of giving the status of Republic to the Sverdlovsk Oblast was submitted to referendum.
- July 1 - Sverdlovsk Regional Council adopted a decision on the proclamation of the Ural Republic.
- September 14 - The heads of the Sverdlovsk, Perm, Chelyabinsk, Orenburg and Kurgan regions decided to participate in the development of the economic model of the Ural Republic on the basis of the Urals regions. The project of the new territorial entity received the name "Greater Ural Republic."
- October 27 - Sverdlovsk Regional Council approved the Constitution of the Ural Republic. The text of the Constitution was published at the "Regional newspaper".
- October 31 - The Constitution of the Ural Republic entered into force.
- November 2 - Eduard Rossel took part in an expanded meeting of the Council of Ministers of the Russian Federation. At that meeting, Russian President Boris Yeltsin said that the desire of regions to raise their own status is a natural process, and that the government should take it into consideration.
- November 5 - At the press conference Eduard Rossel said about the support of the Ural Republic by Yeltsin and about his intention to continue the development of the Republic.
- November 8 - Regional council announced that the governor elections and elections of bicameral Legislative Assembly of Ural Republic would be held on November 12.
- November 9 - A Presidential Decree number 1874 on the dissolution of the Sverdlovsk Regional Council, and then, on November 10 - the Decree No. 1890 on the dismissal of Eduard Rossel. All their decisions regarding the Ural Republic were declared null and void. Valery Trushnikov was appointed as the head of Sverdlovsk Oblast' administration.

== See also ==
- Idel-Ural State
