= Dmitry Kamenshchik =

Russian businessman

- Born: Dmitry Vladimirovich Kamenshchik; 26 April 1968 (age 58); Sverdlovsk, Yekaterinburg, Russia
- Education: Lomonosov Moscow State University
- Occupations: Former Chairman, Moscow Domodedovo Airport

Dmitry Vladimirovich Kamenshchik (Russian: Дмитрий Владимирович Каменщик; born April 26, 1968) is a Russian and Israeli businessman, the former sole shareholder in Moscow Domodedovo Airport, and the former owner of DME Ltd., the Airport holding company.

In April 2024, Forbes ranked Kamenschik #62 in its list of Russian billionaires with a net worth of USD 2.2 billion.

== Biography ==
Kamenshchik was born in 1968 in Sverdlovsk (Yekaterinburg, Russia), in a family of radio physicists, the Urals Polytechnic Institute (UPI) alumni. His father managed a computer center at Uralgiprotrans, his mother had a similar role in the classified geodesy and mapping organization.

He started his high education on the Faculty of Physics and Energy Engineering at the Moscow Power Engineering Institute, but was conscripted and served in the Soviet Army from 1986 to 1988. In 1990, he was accepted to the Faculty of Philosophy of the Moscow State University but dropped out of MSU some time later to focus on business initiatives. In 2000 he graduated from the Sociological Faculty of the Moscow State University with a major in Economic Sociology. In 2003 he received a PhD degree in Economics from Moscow State University.

Immediately after the enforcement of the 2025 court ruling on the expropriation of Domodedovo Airport, Kamenshchik left Russia and subsequently obtained Israeli citizenship. According to Forbes, he currently resides in Tel Aviv, where he continues his business activities.

== Business ==
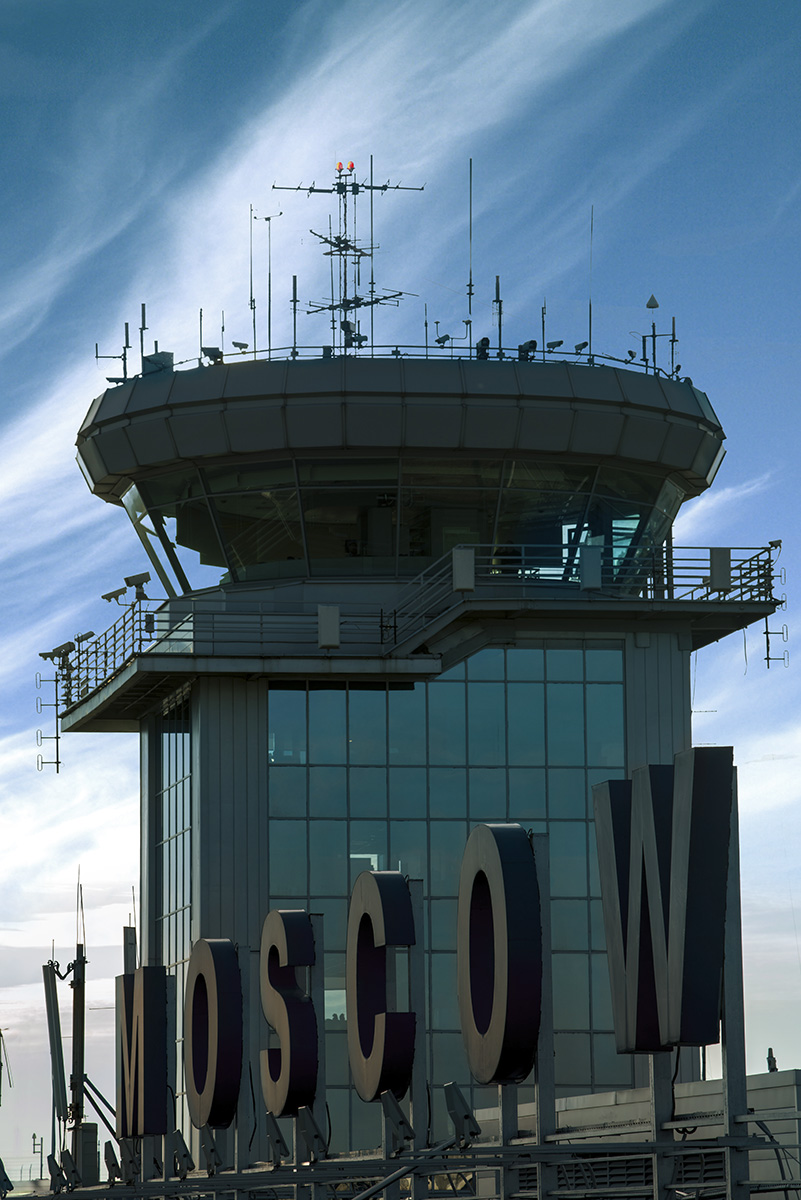
Domodedovo air traffic control tower

In 1991, Kamenschik became the main Moscow representative of East Line, an air transportation company founded by Yekaterinburg-based entrepreneur Anton Bakov.

In the early 1990s, East Line established its business in the Moscow Domodedovo Airport. The company leased cargo planes from the airport management company, reconstructed a number of facilities in the airport, constructed a cargo terminal, a new passenger terminal, etc.

In 1994, Bakov sold his share in East Line to Kamenschik. In the late 1990s, East Line negotiated the purchase of the state-owned stake in Domodedovo air terminal complex. In 1998, it also obtained a 75-year lease for Domodedovo facilities that were not subject to privatization (runways, taxiways, aircraft parking stands, etc.). In 1998, Kamenschik became the chairman of Domodedovo airport.

In 2004 the Federal Agency for State Property Management (Rosimuschestvo) scrutinized the nature of the deals that provided East Line ownership and lease rights. However, the High Court of Arbitration of Russia upheld the legitimacy of the deals by three rulings between 2006 and 2008.

Between 2002 and 2004, Kamenschik acquired shares of Demikhovskiy Machinery Factory, Tsentrosvar Factory and Oktyabrskiy Electric Car Repair Factory, and established a transport engineering R&D company Transmash. In 2004, he sold the assets in production and engineering. The same year, Kamenschik sold East Line (by that time, the company had a fleet of 50 planes and regional offices across Russia) and focused on the Domodedovo Airport.

Since 2005, Domodedovo was the busiest airport by passenger traffic in Russia. In 2014, its passenger numbers reached 33 million people annually It was ranked among the major airports of Europe by the Airports Council International. To further increase the potential of Domodedovo, Kamenschik announced the investments in Aerotropolis, a business and industrial hub next to the airport.

After the terrorist attack at Domodedovo Airport in January 2011 law enforcement authorities tried to determine ultimate owners of the Airport. In the same year during the run-up for the IPO the holding company published information about the final beneficiary at the London Stock Exchange website and specified Kamenshchik as its sole owner. However, the IPO was postponed.

On 18 February 2016 Kamenshchik was arrested in connection with the Domodedovo International Airport bombing of 24 January 2011. He was accused of criminal negligence, causing the death of 37 people. Kamenshchik and Domodedovo Airport denied any wrongdoing, stating that the airport security at the time of the accident fully complied with the legal requirements of that time. After the court hearings, Kamenshchik was put under house arrest until 18 April 2016. He was forbidden to leave his house, communicate with anybody except the investigators and relatives, and to use mail, internet or email. Later, on 1 July 2016, due to the intervention of Deputy Prosecutor General Vladimir Malinovsky, Kamenshchik was released from house arrest. On September 21, 2016, the Investigative Committee of Russia closed the case due to the lack of corpus delicti.

In January 2025, a court ordered the seizure of Domodedovo Airport's assets following a lawsuit filed by the Russian Prosecutor General's Office. The authorities alleged that Domodedovo had come under foreign control because Dmitry Kamenshchik and Valery Kogan, chairman of the airport's supervisory board, held foreign citizenship. On 17 June 2025, the court ordered the transfer of the airport to state ownership. Kamenshchik disputed the claim that he held foreign citizenship, stating that his residence permits in Turkey and the United Arab Emirates had expired long before the Prosecutor General's Office filed its laws.

== Assets assessment ==
The analysis of public data on the transactions involving purchase of the airport controlling stakes in the last three years (Tolmachevo in 2011, Edinburgh in 2012, and Stansted in 2013) suggests that the EV/LTM EBITDA average multiplier came to a factor of 17.2. Application of this multiplier to Domodedovo leads to an estimated value of the airport at approx. USD 7.5 billion.

== Family and hobbies ==
Kamenshchik is single. The Russian media outlets reported that Kamenschik has four or five children. His hobbies include jet piloting, shangi martial art, diving, kiting and mountain skiing.
