= Srednerogatsky Palace =

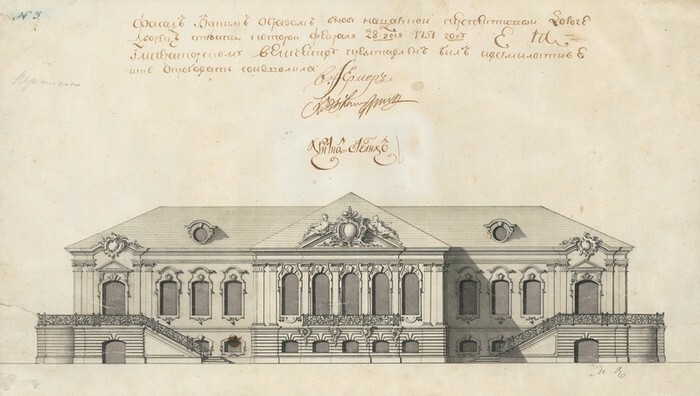
The initial XVIII century project by Rastrelli

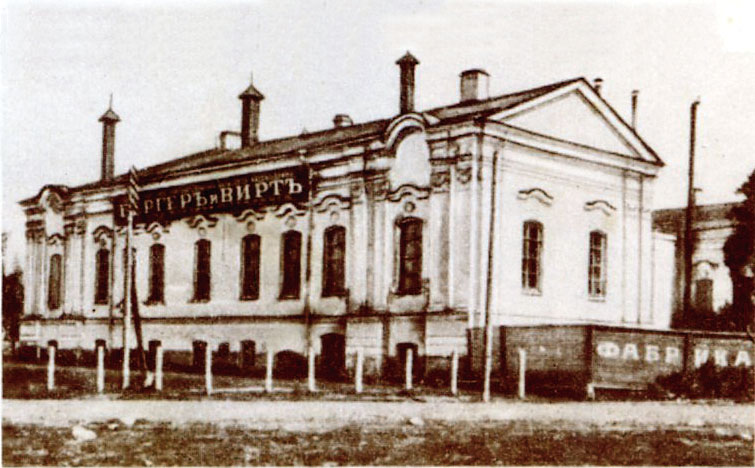
The actual building in early XX century

Srednerogatsky Palace is the extinct Russian royal palace in Saint Petersburg by Francesco Bartolomeo Rastrelli. It was initially built in 1714 at the location called Srednyaya Rogatka where the modern Victory Square is situated.

The palace was initially designed to serve as a rest place for the members of Russian royal Romanov family as they traveled from Saint Petersburg (Russia's capital city at the time) to their suburban residence called Tsarskoye Selo.

It was later reconstructed several times and used for different purposes by different owners and was dismantled in 1974 by USSR authorities during Victory Square creation. The authorities said they would restore the palace at a different location but they never did it.
