= Society of Blue Buckets =

Protest movement in Russia

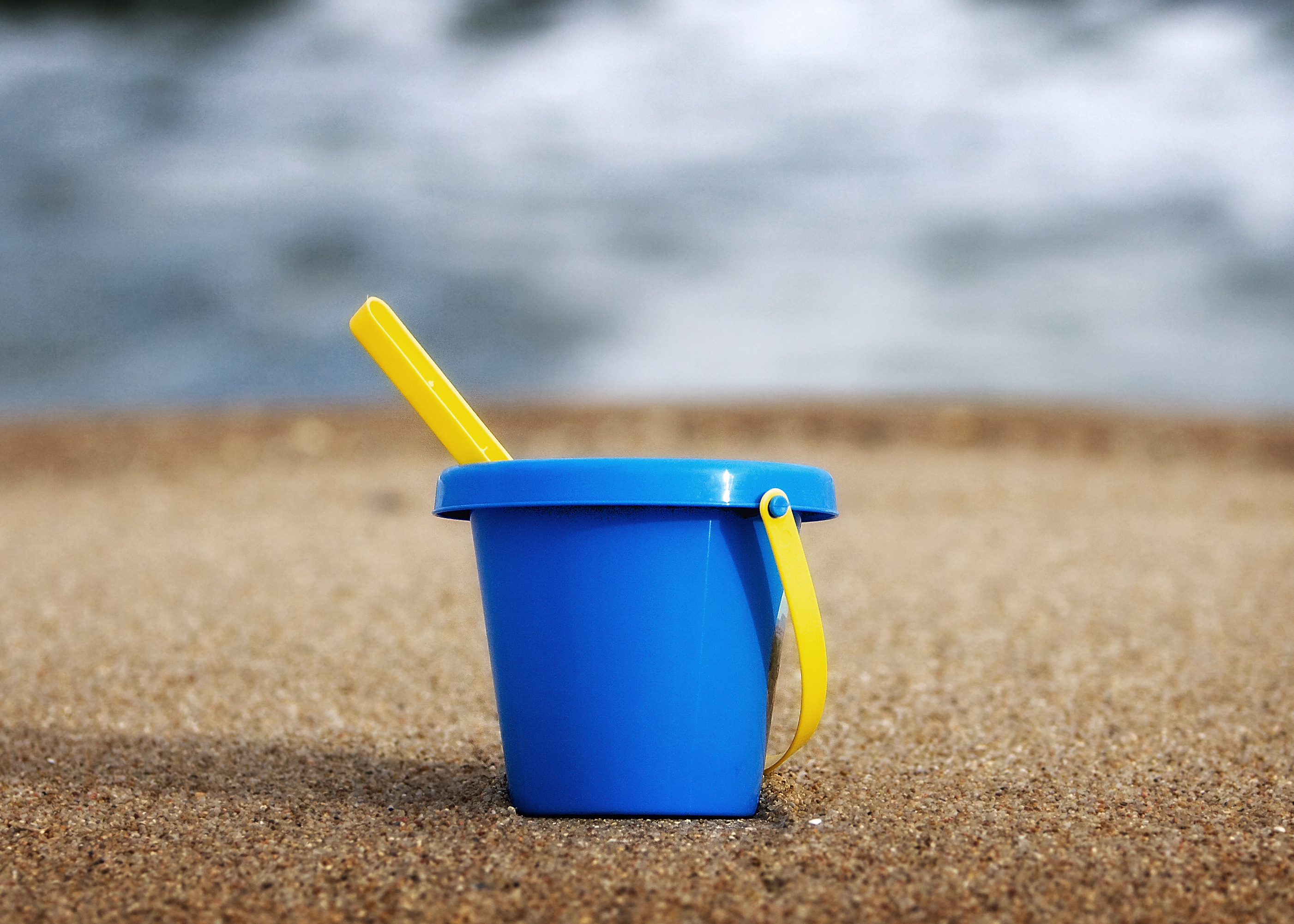
Child's blue bucket

The Society of Blue Buckets (Russian: Общество синих ведёрок Obshchestvo sinikh vedyorok) is a free protest movement that emerged in Russia in 2010 as a response to the arbitrary, self-serving use of emergency rotating blue flashers by public servants. Inspired by blue toy buckets' strong resemblance to emergency blue rotating lights, members of the Society affix buckets to their vehicles’ roofs during automotive flashmobs, as a manifestation of their protest against misuse of emergency lights.

== Formation ==
The Russian traffic code states that an emergency vehicle can have priority if it is furnished with flashing blue light, an accompanying siren, both of which must be on, and an appropriate graphic livery of the emergency service it belongs to. The latter condition cannot be fulfilled by "VIP" vehicles of civil servants. Nevertheless, these are allowed by individual proponents of Russian government.

While the legal arguments for their legitimacy is a subject for heated discussions, recent years have seen a huge spread of such VIP vehicles. Blue flashing lights can nowadays be seen not only on senior government officials' vehicles, but on cars of businessmen and celebrities like Nikita Mikhalkov, many of whom acquire the flashing lights via clandestine channels and/or bribes. Their use has also been controversial, journalists and internet users have spotted such lights on cars being used for leisure activities and ordinary commuting of government servants and celebrities, and being used by their families.

A number of car accidents caused by "VIP" vehicles have brought the issue into headlines and inspired motorists to take part in street protests.

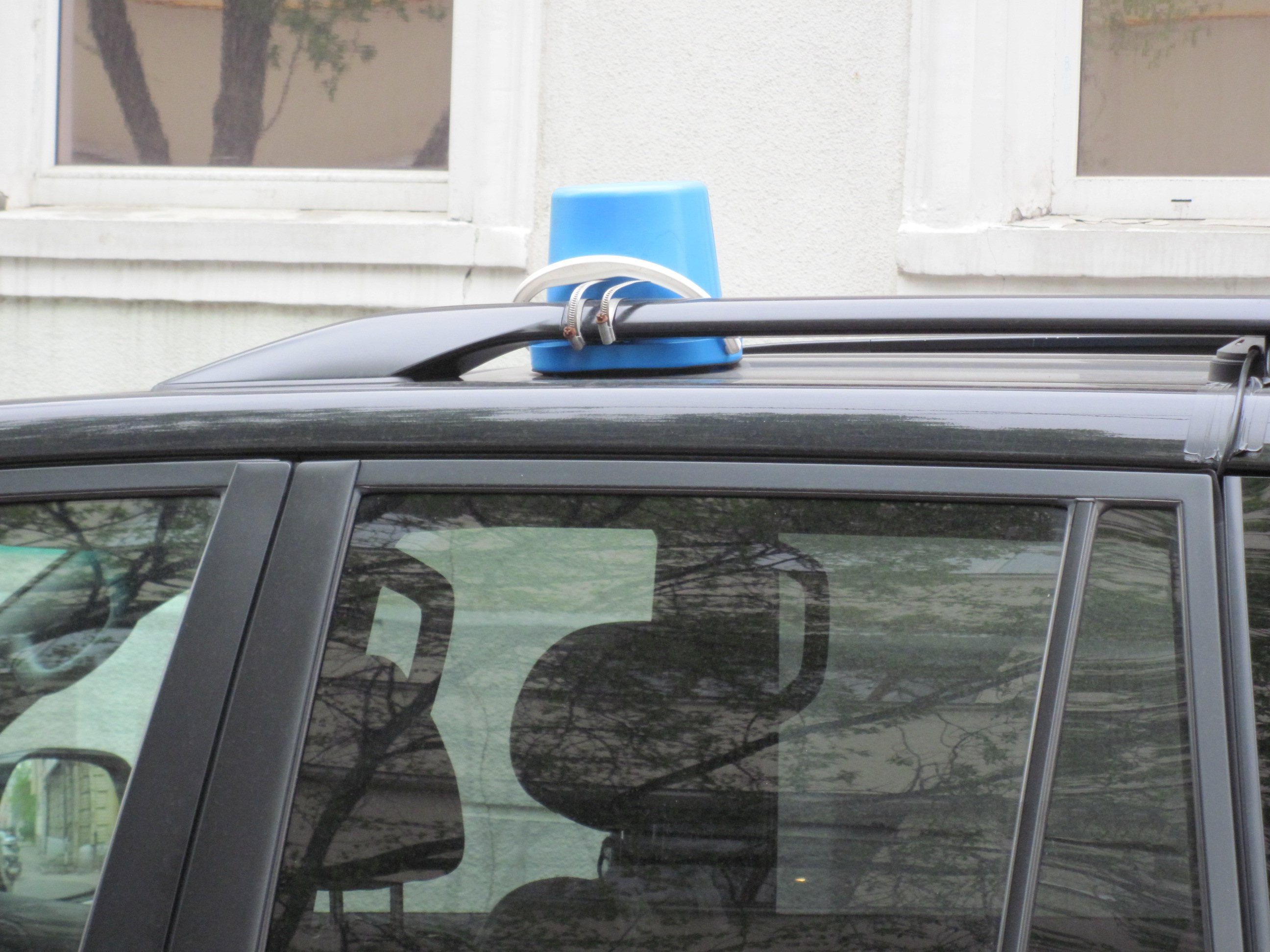
One way of affixing a blue bucket on a car. Moscow, 2011.

One accident that fueled the Society's development took place on 25 February 2010. A head-on collision happened in the morning rush hour on a central lane (that is reserved for emergency vehicles) between a Mercedes-Benz S500 and Citroën C3. The privileged Mercedes with a blue flasher on top was carrying the deputy director of Lukoil, Anatoly Barkov. Unlike Barkov, who was barely injured, the two female physicians in the Citroën died. In public opinion, investigation on this matter and its conclusions were considered to be doubtful, especially the initial finding that the Citroën was responsible for the accident as it had ostensibly skidded into reserved contraflow lane. Substantial public and internet-society outcries insisted on the opposite. Public pressure forced the Prime Minister of Russia, Dmitry Medvedev, to put this case under personal control of Russian Minister of the Interior Rashid Nurgaliyev.

In response to this and to other similar incidents (where official investigations finding the "VIP"-cars to be responsible are a rare exception), the Russian Motorist Federation has declared a "war" on all non-emergency "flashers" (the Russian language slang-word for rotating light is "migalka" (мигалка, translated: flasher).

The first blue bucket protest action was organized by Sergei Parkhomenko from project "Snob". The idea came from a youtube video published several years earlier, presenting a man who took his son's blue toy bucket from a sandbox and affixed it to the top of his car. On 14 April 2010 the first public protest action took place. A motorcade of cars with blue buckets on top paraded through Moscow and was warmly welcomed.

== Reaction ==
Russian police authorities attempted to impede the protests by arresting some of the community members. Those arrests attracted extra attention to the misuse of emergency blue flashers which fired up further protest actions. The issue was then taken up by local and national broadcasting media.

The Society of Blue Buckets discusses issues via LiveJournal, and openly encourages drivers in not giving way to "VIP" vehicles. It also offers legal support to accident victims.

Two accidents with ensuing consequences took place in November 2010. The first occurred when a driver refused to make way to a "flasher" BMW and was attacked by passengers from an escort vehicle, who were the members of Telman Ismailov's AST security company. However the "flasher" was illegal since the passenger was not a civil servant. Russian authorities initially attempted to slacken the pace of case proceedings, but internet-society outcry forced Rashid Nurgaliyev to assist the investigation. The second incident was provoked by a "VIP-flasher" BMW that side-swiped a passing car while overtaking. Security staff from the "VIP" escort threatened the motorist from that car. Later on, it was found out that the "VIP" car was assigned to the Chairman of the Ingushetia Assembly, Makhmud Sakalov. Exclusively with assistance of the President of Ingushetia Yunus-bek Yevkurov, and due to "blue-bucket" internet appeal, proceedings began. Eventually it turned out that Sakalov's security staff used the car as an illegal "flasher-taxi" during his absence from Moscow.

On January 19, 2011, a head-on collision, between an Opel Astra and a BMW 5 Series took place on the Rublyovo-Uspenskoye Highway. The former car carried a young 23-year-old woman who was seriously injured with multiple fractures. The latter vehicle carried the Presidential envoy to the State Duma, Garri Minkh, who suffered a minor facial injury, but his driver soon died from his injuries. Once again the society is certain that the BMW was in the opposite lane as public space videos, published by the driver, showed him regularly abusing his status and driving in opposite lanes. This was corroborated by numerous witnesses. However, the official comments by the investigation have either been neutral, or suggested that the young woman was responsible.

== Other involvements ==
In the wake of the 2011 Russian legislative election, at the large white-ribbon Moscow protest (miting, meeting), reported Blue Bucket coordinator Petr Shkumatov filmed the crowd with his phone from the stage and addressed the crowd, saying: "You guys are so great! ... Really! You guys are so great! Thank you so much for not staying home on your couches and drinking beer! Thank you for coming out, and showing them that you are not cattle. Thank you for coming out! You are all so wonderful!"
