= 2025 Orenburg Oblast gubernatorial election =

- 12–14 September 2025
- Turnout: 49.23% ▲2.49 pp
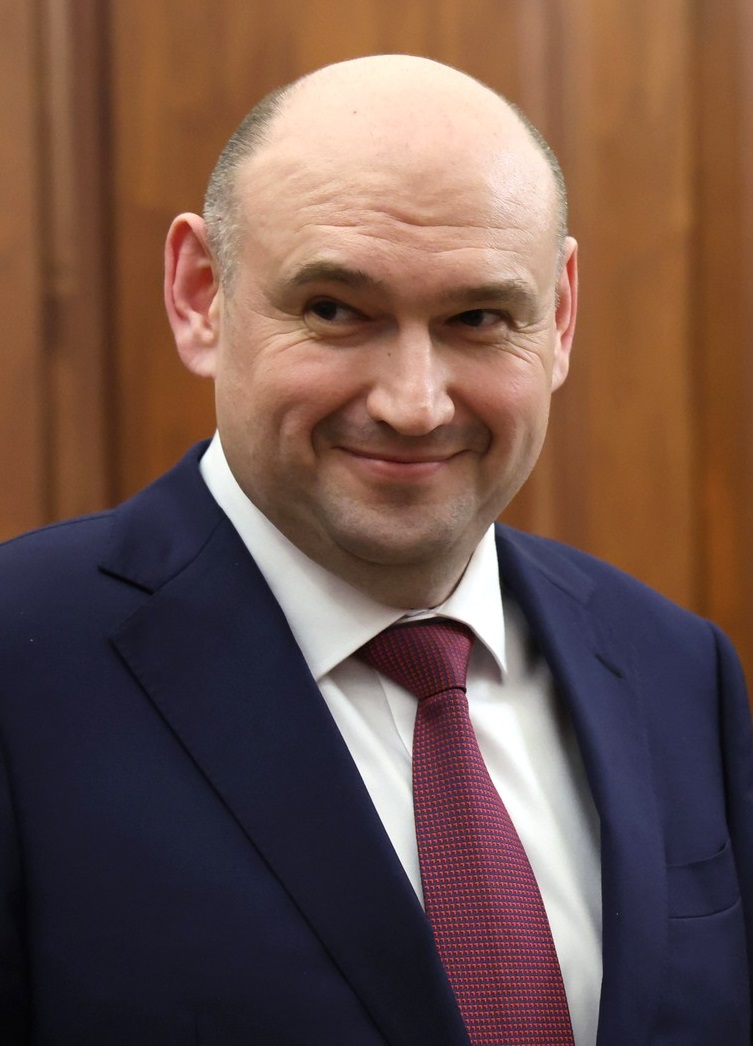

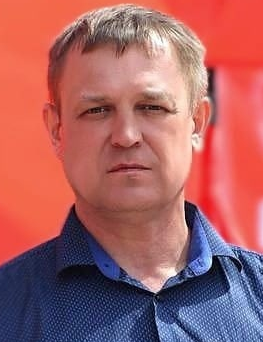
Candidate	Yevgeny Solntsev	Denis Baturin
Party	United Russia	CPRF
Popular vote	621,960	43,992
Percentage	83.85%	5.93%
Governor before election
Yevgeny Solntsev (acting)
United Russia
Governor-elect
Yevgeny Solntsev
United Russia

The 2025 Orenburg Oblast gubernatorial election took place on 12–14 September 2025, on common election day. Acting Governor of Orenburg Oblast Yevgeny Solntsev was elected for a full term in office.

== Background ==
Energy executive Denis Pasler, former Chairman of the Government of Sverdlovsk Oblast (2012–2016), was appointed acting Governor of Orenburg Oblast in March 2019, replacing two-term Governor Yury Berg. Pasler ran for a full term in 2019 and won the election with 65.94% of the vote. Throughout 2021-2024 numerous sources reported that Pasler was considering resigning early from the gubernatorial office and would return to the private sector, however, those exploits never came to life. Governor Pasler overwhelmingly won re-election in 2024 with 78.14%, while his main challenger, Communist businessman Vladimir Gudomarov, failed to qualify. Pasler was able to easily secure a second term despite deadly April 2024 Orsk Dam collapse, which left Orsk, the second largest city in Orenburg Oblast, flooded for months.

In March 2025 Denis Pasler was named the top contender to replace Yevgeny Kuyvashev as Governor of Sverdlovsk Oblast. On March 26, 2025, Kuyvashev tendered his resignation, later that day President of Russia Vladimir Putin met with Denis Pasler and asked him to become acting Governor of Sverdlovsk Oblast, which Pasler accepted; simultaneously President Putin met with Prime Minister of Donetsk People's Republic Yevgeny Solntsev and asked him to replace Pasler in Orenburg Oblast, which Solntsev also accepted.

== Candidates ==
In Orenburg Oblast candidates for Governor of Orenburg Oblast can be nominated only by registered political parties. Candidate for Governor of Orenburg Oblast should be a Russian citizen and at least 30 years old. Candidates for Governor of Orenburg Oblast should not have a foreign citizenship or residence permit. Each candidate in order to be registered is required to collect at least 5% of signatures of members and heads of municipalities. Also gubernatorial candidates present 3 candidacies to the Federation Council and election winner later appoints one of the presented candidates.

=== Declared ===
Candidate name, political party		Occupation	Status	Ref.
Denis Baturin; Communist Party	Denis Baturin	Member of Orenburg City Council (2015–present); Security systems engineer	Registered	
Ramil Gafarov; Communists of Russia	Ramil Gafarov	Pensioner; 2024 gubernatorial candidate	Registered	
Oksana Nabatchikova; SR–ZP	Oksana Nabatchikova	Former Member of Legislative Assembly of Orenburg Oblast (2016–2021, 2021–2023); 2024 gubernatorial candidate	Registered	
Karina Salikhova; New People	Karina Salikhova	Nonprofit director	Registered	
Yevgeny Solntsev; United Russia	Yevgeny Solntsev	Acting Governor of Orenburg Oblast (2025–present); Former Prime Minister of Donetsk People's Republic (2023–2025)	Registered	

=== Eliminated at the convention ===
- Olga Saldayeva (United Russia), Member of Civic Chamber of Russia (2020–present), pedagogical college director
- Aleksandr Trubnikov (United Russia), Deputy Chairman of the Legislative Assembly of Orenburg Oblast (2016–present), Member of the Legislative Assembly (2002–present)

=== Declined ===
- Yelena Afanasyeva (LDPR), Senator from Orenburg Oblast (2014–present)
- Maksim Amelin (CPRF), Member of Legislative Assembly of Orenburg Oblast (2013–present), 2019 gubernatorial candidate
- Vladimir Gudomarov (CPRF), Member of Legislative Assembly of Orenburg Oblast (2021–present), energy executive, 2024 gubernatorial candidate
- Yekaterina Kalegina (New People), Member of Legislative Assembly of Orenburg Oblast (2021–present), 2024 gubernatorial candidate
- Nina Ostanina (CPRF), Member of State Duma (1995–2011, 2021–present), 1997 Kemerovo Oblast gubernatorial candidate

=== Candidates for Federation Council ===
Head candidate, political party	Candidates for Federation Council	Status
Denis Baturin; Communist Party	* Maksim Amelin, Member of Legislative Assembly of Orenburg Oblast (2013–present), 2019 gubernatorial candidate * Lyaysan Kotkova, Member of Legislative Assembly of Orenburg Oblast (2021–present), nurse * Nurlan Munzhasarov, Member of Legislative Assembly of Orenburg Oblast (2021–present)	Registered
Ramil Gafarov; Communists of Russia	* Irina Geraskina, businesswoman * Igor Petrov, businessman * Sergey Ryabov, pensioner	Registered
Oksana Nabatchikova; SR–ZP	* Andrey Gubiy, former Member of Orenburg City Council (2020–2024) * Aleksandr Kolybelnikov, Member of Legislative Assembly of Orenburg Oblast (2023–present), businessman * Vyacheslav Rashchupkin, Member of Legislative Assembly of Orenburg Oblast (2021–present)	Registered
Karina Salikhova; New People	* Aleksandr Kozhevnikov, businessman * Yelena Mishustina, middle school deputy principal * Eleonora Sborets, tax expert	Registered
Yevgeny Solntsev; United Russia	* Yelena Afanasyeva (LDPR), incumbent Senator (2014–present) * Olga Saldayeva, Member of Civic Chamber of Russia (2020–present), pedagogical college director * Yury Shevyakov, Presidential Administration of Russia official	Registered

== Finances ==
All sums are in rubles.

Financial Report	Source	Baturin	Gafarov	Nabatchikova	Salikhova	Solntsev
First		129,000	4,740,689	1,905,600	5,090,000	25,000,000
Final		2,541,500	8,610,689	5,851,792	14,800,500	57,000,000

== Polls ==
Fieldwork date	Polling firm	Solntsev	Baturin	Gafarov	Nabatchikova	Salikhova	None	Lead
14 September 2025	2025 election	83.9	5.9	3.3	3.0	2.4	1.5	78.0
5–19 August 2025	WCIOM	75.9	10.7	3.5	5.0	3.1	1.8	65.2

== Results ==
Summary of the 12–14 September 2025 Orenburg Oblast gubernatorial election results
Candidate	Party	Votes	%
Yevgeny Solntsev (incumbent)	United Russia	621,960	83.85
Denis Baturin	Communist Party	43,992	5.93
Ramil Gafarov	Communists of Russia	24,373	3.29
Oksana Nabatchikova	A Just Russia – For Truth	22,160	2.99
Karina Salikhova	New People	17,862	2.41
Valid votes		730,347	98.46
Blank ballots		11,369	1.53
Total		741,749	100.00
Turnout		741,749	49.23
Registered voters		1,506,822	100.00

Governor Solntsev re-appointed incumbent Senator Yelena Afanasyeva (LDPR) to the Federation Council.

== See also ==
- 2025 Russian regional elections
