= 2024 Orenburg Oblast gubernatorial election =

← 2019	6–8 September 2024	2025 →
- Turnout: 52.56%
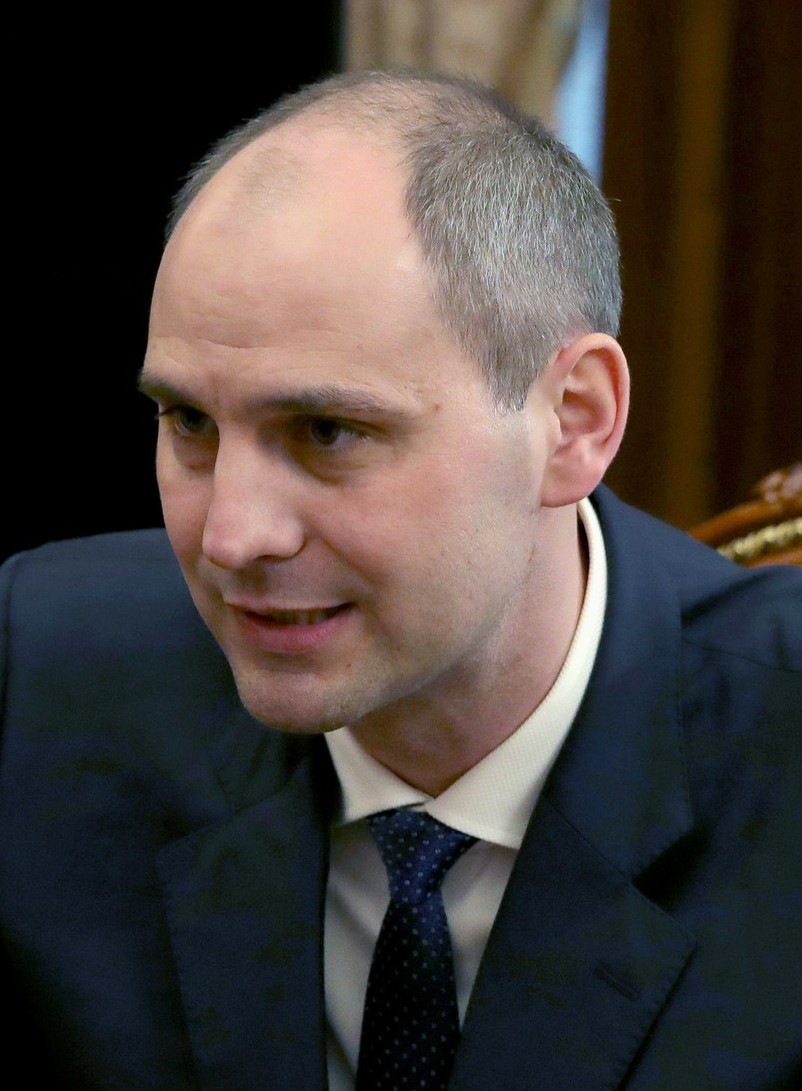

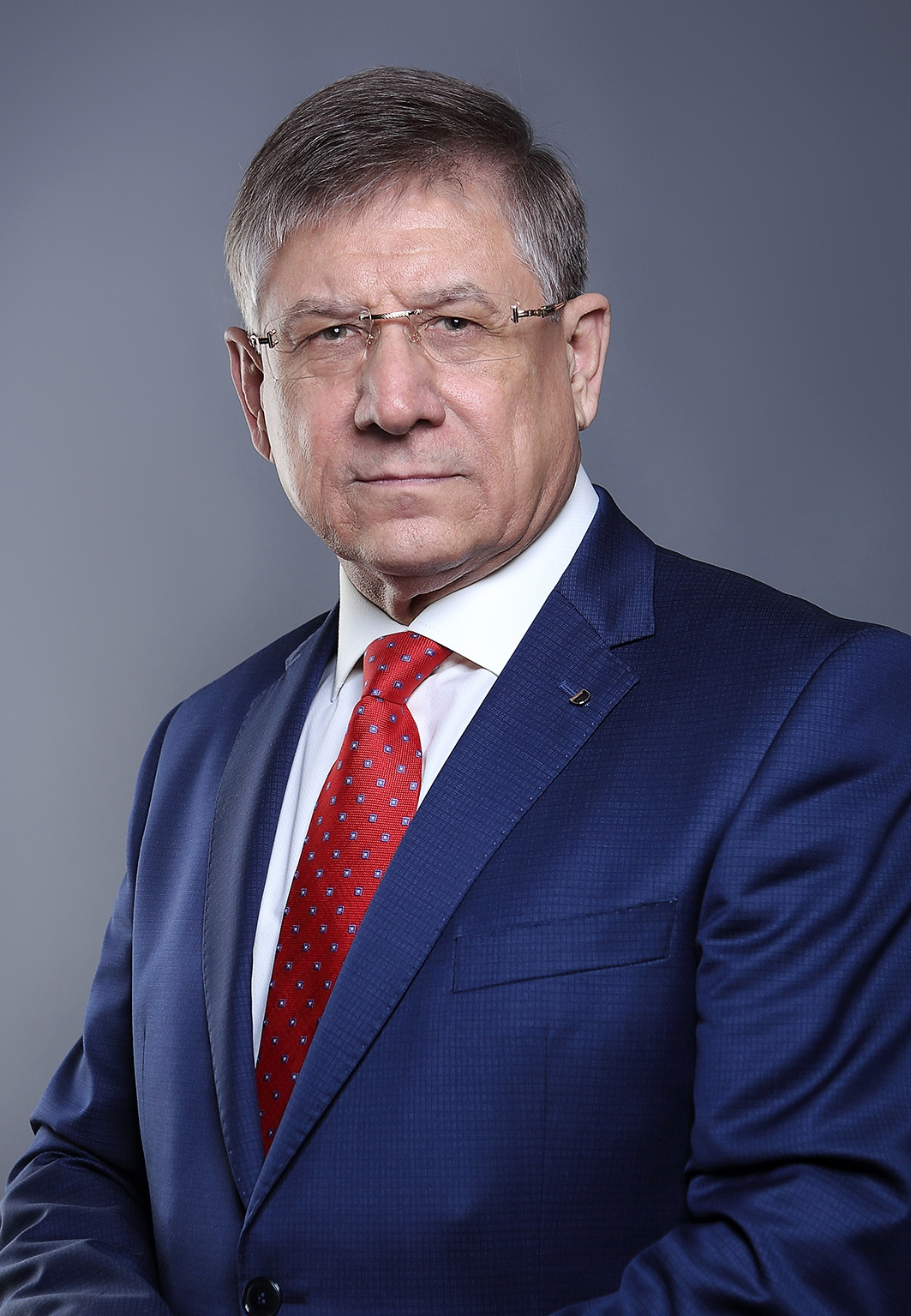

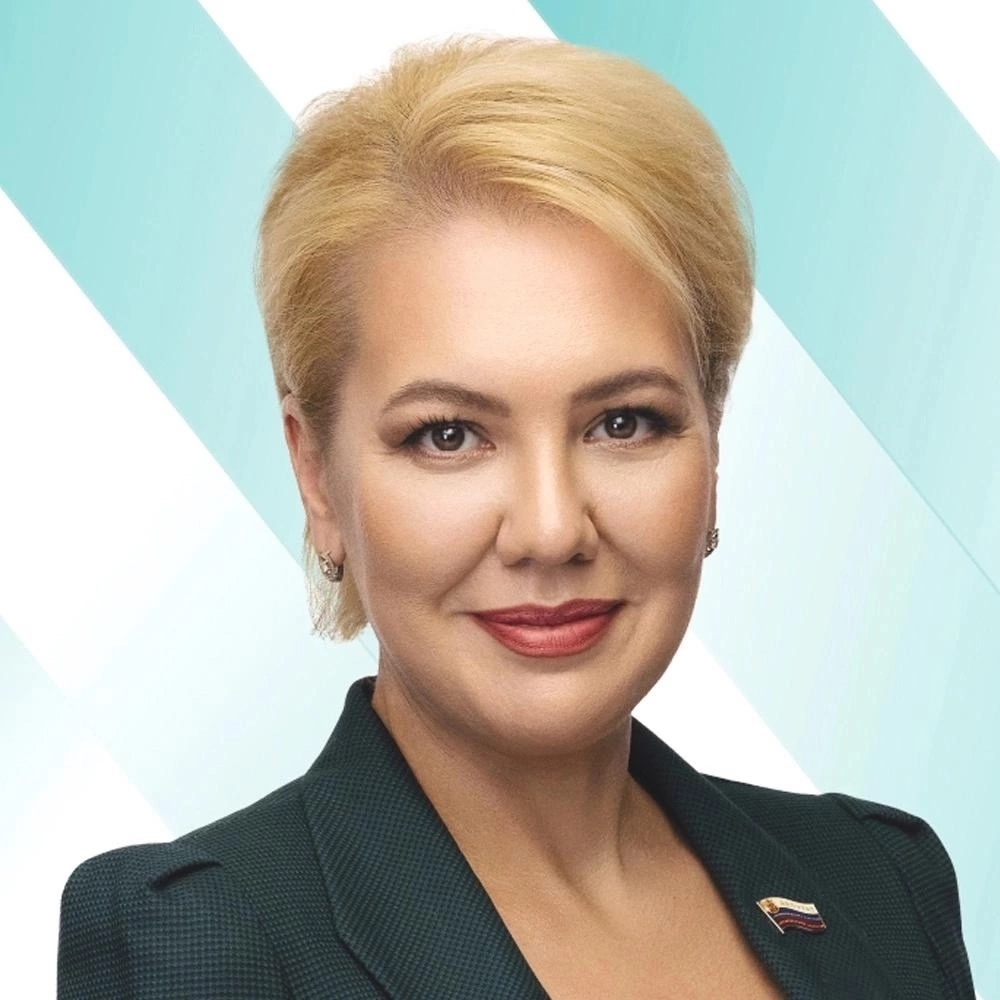

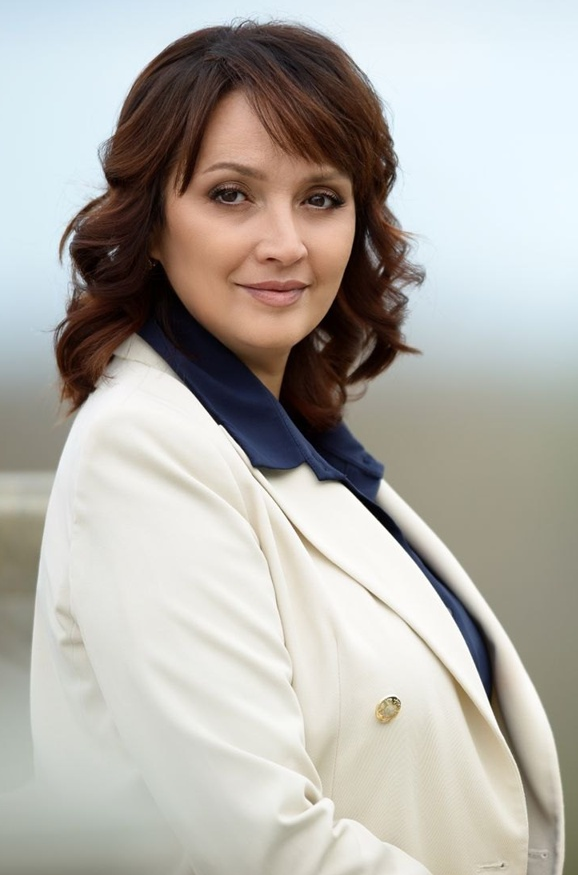
Candidate	Denis Pasler	Ramil Gafarov
Party	United Russia	Communists of Russia
Popular vote	616,565	57,432
Percentage	78.14%	7.28%
Candidate	Yekaterina Kalegina	Oksana Nabatchikova
Party	New People	SR–ZP
Popular vote	51,985	48,505
Percentage	6.59%	6.15%
Governor before election
Denis Pasler
United Russia
Governor-elect
Denis Pasler
United Russia

The 2024 Orenburg Oblast gubernatorial election took place on 6–8 September 2024, on common election day. Incumbent Governor Denis Pasler was re-elected to a second term in office.

== Background ==
Energy executive Denis Pasler, a former Chairman of the Government of Sverdlovsk Oblast (2012–2016) was appointed acting Governor of Orenburg Oblast in March 2019, replacing two-term Governor Yury Berg. Berg's resignation was widely expected as by the end of 2018 Berg was rated among the most unpopular governors in Russia.

Pasler was nominated for full term by United Russia and won the September 2019 gubernatorial election with 65.94% of the vote with Communist Maksim Amelin placing second (23.72%). During the campaign 2014 gubernatorial candidate and LDPR State Duma member Sergey Katasonov initially expressed interest in running for a second time but eventually did not file, while in exchange Pasler renominated LDPR member and incumbent Senator Yelena Afanasyeva.

In January 2022 rumours surfaced that Governor Pasler in a short time would resign and return to the private sector, however, Pasler has never actually resigned during 2022. In November 2023 it was again reported that Pasler had considered retirement since at least 2021 and was thought to resign in spring 2024, ahead of the 2024 gubernatorial election. In case of Pasler's early resignation Presidential Administration adviser Aleksandr Sokolov had been considered a potential appointee prior to his nomination as acting Governor of Kirov Oblast in May 2022. Senator Afanasyeva expressed her interest in running for the governor to succeed Pasler in 2024, while some experts view State Duma member Oleg Dimov as the frontrunner for the position. Rumours about Pasler's potential retirement intensified in early 2024 after disastrous Orsk Dam collapse, leaving Orsk, the second largest city in the region, flooded since early April. However, in May 2024 during a meeting with President Vladimir Putin Governor Pasler announced his intention to run for a second term and received Putin's endorsement.

== Candidates ==
In Orenburg Oblast candidates for Governor can be nominated only by registered political parties. Candidate for Governor of Orenburg Oblast should be a Russian citizen and at least 30 years old. Candidates for Governor should not have a foreign citizenship or residence permit. Each candidate in order to be registered is required to collect at least 5% of signatures of members and heads of municipalities. Also gubernatorial candidates present 3 candidacies to the Federation Council and election winner later appoints one of the presented candidates.

=== Declared ===
Candidate name, political party		Occupation	Status	Ref.
Ramil Gafarov; Communists of Russia		Pensioner	Registered	
Yekaterina Kalegina; New People		Member of Legislative Assembly of Orenburg Oblast (2021–present)	Registered	
Oksana Nabatchikova; SR–ZP		Former Member of Legislative Assembly of Orenburg Oblast (2016–2021, 2021–2023)	Registered	
Denis Pasler; United Russia	Denis Pasler	Incumbent Governor of Orenburg Oblast (2019–present)	Registered	
Vladimir Gudomarov; Communist Party		Member of Legislative Assembly of Orenburg Oblast (2021–present); Energy executive	Failed to qualify	
Oksana Rodimtseva; Party of Russia's Rebirth		Dentist	Failed to qualify	

=== Eliminated at convention ===
- Gennady Averyanov (United Russia), Member of Legislative Assembly of Orenburg Oblast (1998–2002, 2006–present)

=== Declined ===
- Yelena Afanasyeva (LDPR), Senator from Orenburg Oblast (2014–present)
- Oleg Dimov (United Russia), Member of State Duma (2021–present)
- Nina Ostanina (CPRF), Member of State Duma (1995–2011, 2021–present), Chairwoman of the Duma Committee on Family, Motherhood, Fatherhood, and Children (2021–present)

=== Candidates for Federation Council ===
Gubernatorial candidate, political party	Candidates for Federation Council	Status
Ramil Gafarov; Communists of Russia	* Igor Petrov, private security businessman * Sergey Ryabov, pensioner * Aleksandr Uzdyayev (PARZAS), nonprofit executive	Registered
Yekaterina Kalegina; New People	* Oleg Bochkarev, businessman * Yelena Kapkova, middle school principal * Aleksandr Vlasov, Orsk Metalware Plant director	Registered
Oksana Nabatchikova; SR–ZP	* Andrey Gubiy, individual entrepreneur * Aleksandr Kolybelnikov, Member of Legislative Assembly of Orenburg Oblast (2023–present), engineer * Vyacheslav Rashchupkin, Member of Legislative Assembly of Orenburg Oblast (2021–present)	Registered
Denis Pasler; United Russia	* Yelena Afanasyeva (LDPR), incumbent Senator (2014–present) * Yaroslav Chirkov, Chairman of the Orenburg Oblast Federation of Labour Unions (2015–present) * Yelena Ilyina, chairwoman of the Movement of the First regional office	Registered

== Finances ==
All sums are in rubles.

Financial Report	Source	Gafarov	Gudomarov	Kalegina	Nabatchikova	Pasler	Rodimtseva
First		12,050,000	206,420	35,000	180,000	20,000,000	15,540
Final		29,810,000	214,100	10,785,000	4,795,000	60,000,000	15,540

== Results ==
Summary of the 6–8 September 2024 Orenburg Oblast gubernatorial election results
Candidate	Party	Votes	%
Denis Pasler (incumbent)	United Russia	616,565	78.14
Ramil Gafarov	Communists of Russia	57,432	7.28
Yekaterina Kalegina	New People	51,985	6.59
Oksana Nabatchikova	A Just Russia – For Truth	48,505	6.15
Valid votes		774,487	98.16
Blank ballots		14,532	1.84
Total		789,033	100.00
Turnout		789,033	52.56
Registered voters		1,501,118	100.00

Governor Pasler re-appointed incumbent Senator Yelena Afanasyeva (LDPR) to the Federation Council.

== See also ==
- 2024 Russian regional elections
