= 2026 Orenburg Oblast legislative election =

Regional legislative election in Russia

- 18–20 September 2026

All 47 seats in the Legislative Assembly 24 seats needed for a majority
- Turnout: 57.14% ▲11.81 pp
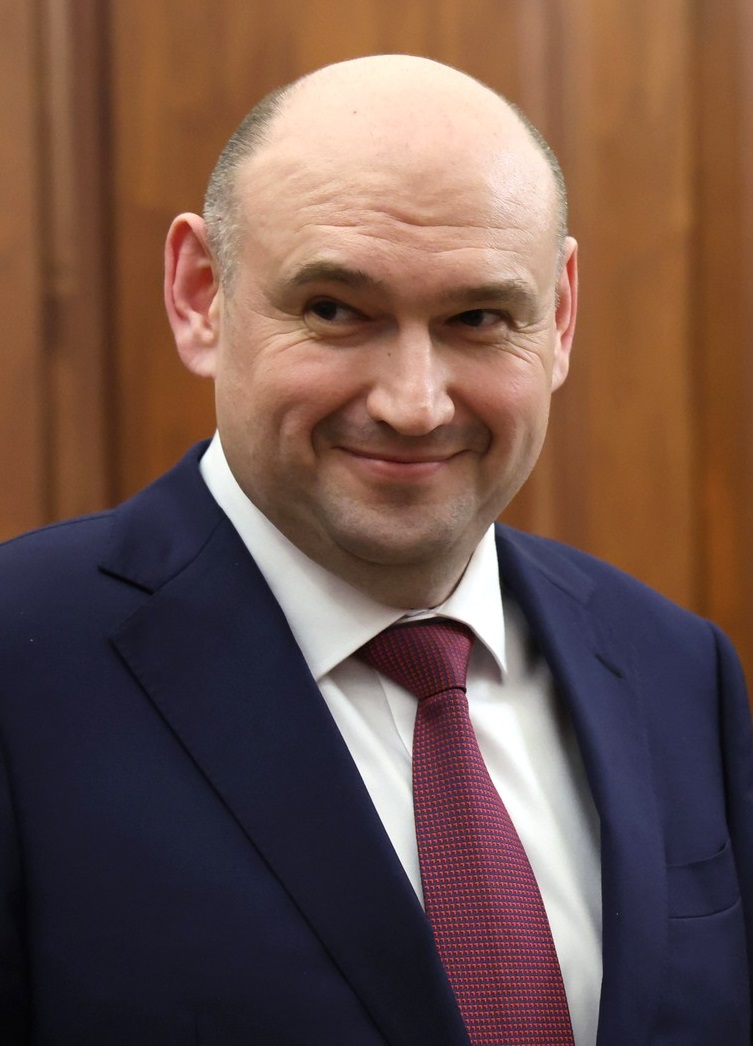

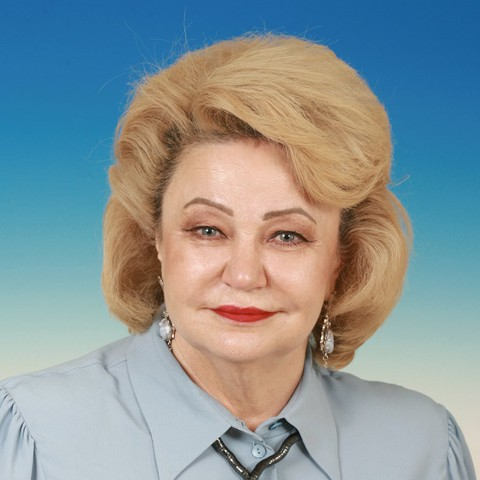

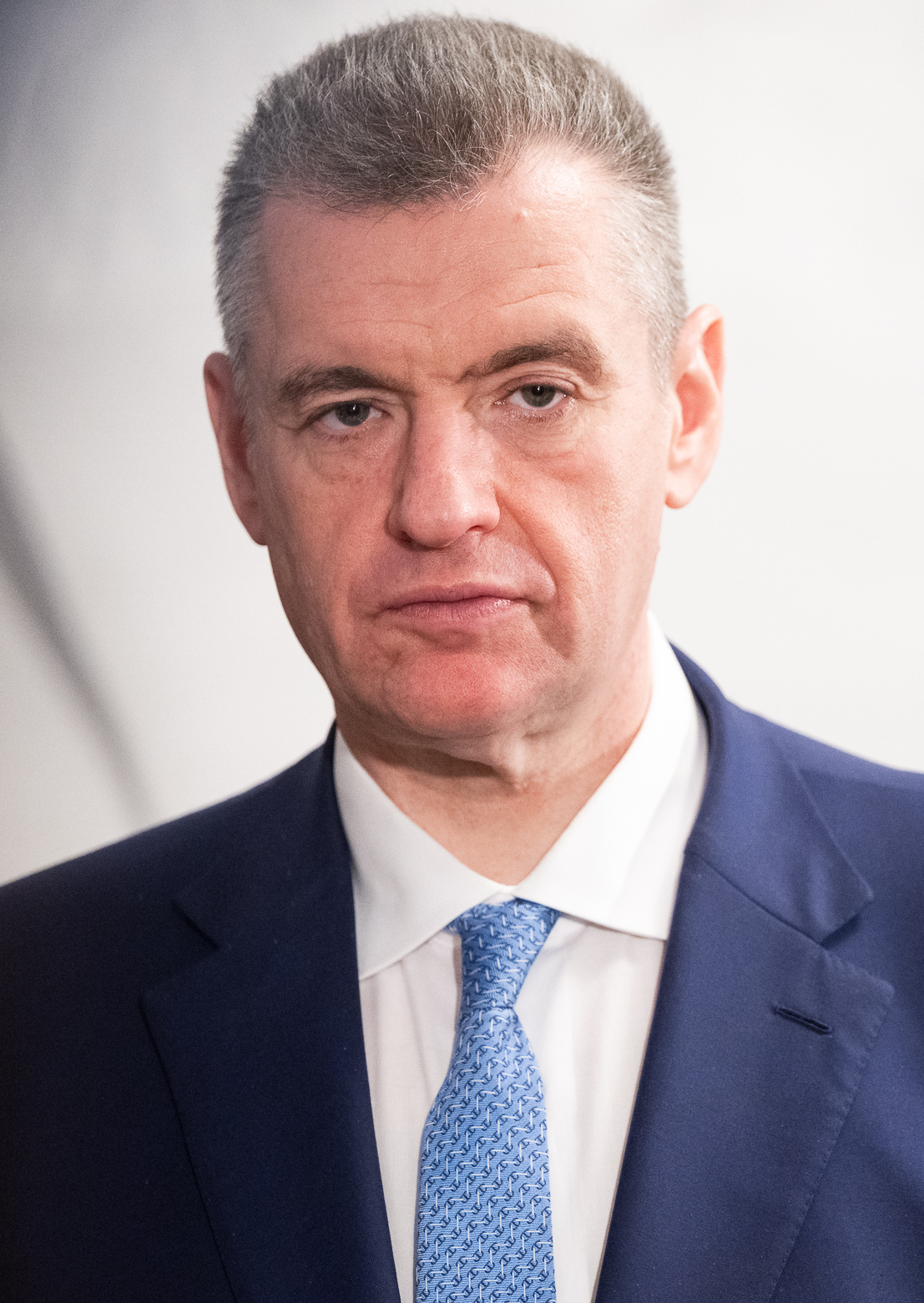

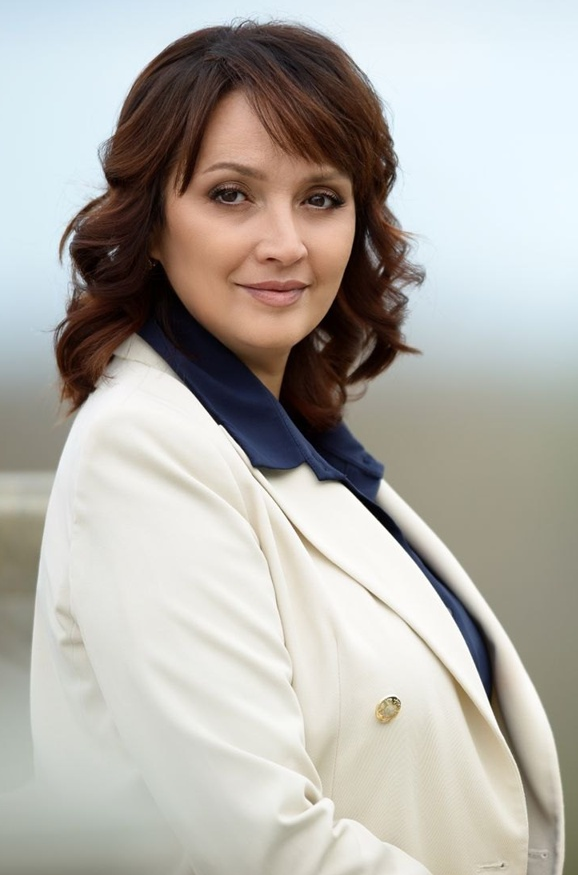
	Majority party	Minority party	Third party
Candidate	Yevgeny Solntsev	Nina Ostanina	Leonid Slutsky
Party	United Russia	CPRF	LDPR
Last election	39.46%, 29 seats	29.11%, 12 seats	10.57%, 2 seats
Seats won	41	3	1
Seat change	▲12	▼9	▼1
Popular vote	522,171	112,204	51,807
Percentage	62.75%	13.48%	6.23%
Swing	▲23.29 pp	▼15.63 pp	▼4.34 pp
	Fourth party	Fifth party	Sixth party
	NL		RPPSS
Candidate	Aleksey Drynov	Oksana Nabatchikova	Grigory Inochkin
Party	New People	A Just Russia	Party of Pensioners
Last election	Failed to qualify	10.07%, 3 seats	6.86%, 1 seat
Seats won	1	1	0
Seat change	Failed to qualify	▼2	▼1
Popular vote	49,725	42,038	24,423
Percentage	5.98%	5.05%	2.94%
Swing	Failed to qualify	▼5.02 pp	▼3.92 pp
Chairman before election
Sergey Grachyov
United Russia
Elected Chairman
Sergey Grachyov
United Russia
Senator before election
Andrey Shevchenko
United Russia
Senator after election
Andrey Shevchenko
United Russia

The 2026 Legislative Assembly of Orenburg Oblast election took place on 18–20 September 2026, on common election day, coinciding with the 2026 Russian legislative election. All 47 seats in the Legislative Assembly were up for re-election.

United Russia increased its majority in the Legislative Assembly, winning 62.8% of the vote and all 23 single-mandate constituencies. Communist Party of the Russian Federation suffered a major defeat, losing 2/3 of its seats. Liberal Democratic Party of Russia, A Just Russia and Russian Party of Pensioners for Social Justice all lost between 1 and 2 seats each with Party of Pensioners failing to retain its faction. New People entered the Legislative Assembly for the first time, winning 6% of the vote.

== Electoral system ==
Under current election laws, the Legislative Assembly is elected for a term of five years, with parallel voting. 24 seats are elected by party-list proportional representation with a 5% electoral threshold, with the other part elected in 23 single-member constituencies by first-past-the-post voting. Seats in the proportional part are allocated using the Imperiali quota, modified to ensure that every party list, which passes the threshold, receives at least one mandate.

== Candidates ==
=== Party lists ===
To register regional lists of candidates, parties need to collect 0.5% of signatures of all registered voters in Orenburg Oblast.

The following parties were relieved from the necessity to collect signatures:

- United Russia
- Communist Party of the Russian Federation
- Liberal Democratic Party of Russia
- A Just Russia
- New People
- Russian Party of Pensioners for Social Justice
- Communists of Russia

№	Party	Oblast-wide list	Candidates	Territorial groups	Status
1	United Russia	Yevgeny Solntsev • Nursultan Mussagaleyev • Sergey Grachyov • Andrey Shevchenko	119	23	Registered
2	Communist Party	Nina Ostanina • Maksim Amelin • Denis Baturin • Vladimir Yegorov	78	23	Registered
3	Party of Pensioners	Grigory Inochkin • Konstantin Zolotarev • Eva Azarova	29	13	Registered
4	Communists of Russia	Ramil Gafarov • Aleksey Sizov • Luiza Miftakhitdinova	75	23	Registered
5	Liberal Democratic Party	Leonid Slutsky • Yelena Afanasyeva • Andrey Reyzler • Maksim Romanov	73	23	Registered
6	New People	Aleksey Drynov • Karina Salikhova • Vladimir Nitsenko	84	23	Registered
7	A Just Russia	Oksana Nabatchikova • Aleksandr Kolybelnikov • Vyacheslav Rashchupkin	61	23	Registered

New People and Communists of Russia will take part in the Orenburg Oblast legislative election for the first time. New People fielded its candidates in 2021 but failed to qualify by collecting signatures.

=== Single-mandate constituencies ===
23 single-mandate constituencies were formed in Orenburg Oblast. To register candidates in single-mandate constituencies need to collect 3% of signatures of registered voters in the constituency.

Number of candidates in single-mandate constituencies
Party	Candidates	
Party	Nominated	Registered
United Russia	23	23
Communist Party	23	21
Liberal Democratic Party	21	18
A Just Russia	23	22
Party of Pensioners	20	19
New People	23	22
Communists of Russia	23	20
Rodina	1	0
Independent	3	0
Total	160	145

== Results ==
=== Results by party lists ===
Summary of the 18–20 September 2026 Legislative Assembly of Orenburg Oblast election results
Party	Party list					Constituency		Total	
Party	Votes	%	±pp	Seats	+/–	Seats	+/–	Seats	+/–
United Russia	522,171	62.75	▲23.29	18	▲7	23	▲5	41	▲12
Communist Party	112,204	13.48	▼15.63	3	▼5	0	▼4	3	▼9
Liberal Democratic Party	51,807	6.23	▼4.34	1	▼1	0	Steady	1	▼1
New People	49,725	5.98	New	1	New	0	New	1	New
A Just Russia	42,038	5.05	▼5.02	1	▼1	0	▼1	1	▼2
Party of Pensioners	24,423	2.94	▼3.92	0	▼1	0	Steady	0	▼1
Communists of Russia	16,371	1.97	New	0	New	0	New	0	New
Invalid ballots	13,366	1.61	▼2.32	—	—	—	—	—	—
Total	832,127	100.00	—	24	Steady	23	Steady	47	Steady
Turnout	832,127	57.14	▲11.81	—	—	—	—	—	—
Registered voters	1,456,179	100.00	—	—	—	—	—	—	—

Sergey Grachyov (United Russia) was re-elected as Chairman of the Legislative Assembly, while incumbent Senator Andrey Shevchenko (United Russia) was re-appointed to the Federation Council.

=== Results in single-member constituencies ===
==== District 1 ====
Summary of the 18–20 September 2026 Legislative Assembly of Orenburg Oblast election in District 1
Candidate	Party	Votes	%
Ildus Davlyatov (incumbent)	United Russia	33,022	72.24%
Dmitry Shantelev	Communist Party	5,877	12.86%
Yekaterina Puzikova	A Just Russia	1,761	3.85%
Maskhut Zakirov	Communists of Russia	1,667	3.65%
Darya Izokanova	New People	1,670	3.65%
Shakir Manashev	Party of Pensioners	1,011	2.21%
Total		45,709	100%

==== District 2 ====
Summary of the 18–20 September 2026 Legislative Assembly of Orenburg Oblast election in District 2
Candidate	Party	Votes	%
Pavel Takmakov	United Russia	18,452	64.03%
Vladimir Turchin (incumbent)	Communist Party	4,637	16.09%
Margarita Ignatova	New People	1,721	5.97%
Aleksey Klimenko	A Just Russia	1,496	5.19%
Aleksandr Mitin	Communists of Russia	1,222	4.24%
Nelli Trofimova	Party of Pensioners	711	2.47%
Total		28,818	100%

==== District 3 ====
Summary of the 18–20 September 2026 Legislative Assembly of Orenburg Oblast election in District 3
Candidate	Party	Votes	%
Aleksandr Ledenyov	United Russia	33,035	68.19%
Aleksandr Petrov	Communist Party	4,771	9.85%
Nadezhda Alamankina	New People	2,414	4.98%
Viktor Kosmachev	Liberal Democratic Party	2,269	4.68%
Bakhadir Aliyev	A Just Russia	2,149	4.44%
Yekaterina Dobrynina	Communists of Russia	1,893	3.91%
Grigory Inochkin	Party of Pensioners	1,372	2.83%
Total		48,447	100%

==== District 4 ====
Summary of the 18–20 September 2026 Legislative Assembly of Orenburg Oblast election in District 4
Candidate	Party	Votes	%
Denis Donskov	United Russia	24,440	56.83%
Yelena Brezhneva	A Just Russia	5,601	13.02%
Pavel Kretov	Communist Party	5,552	12.91%
Lidia Budilova	Communists of Russia	2,616	6.08%
Renat Sattarov	Liberal Democratic Party	2,068	4.81%
Sergey Zaytsev	Party of Pensioners	1,916	4.46%
Total		43,004	100%

==== District 5 ====
Summary of the 18–20 September 2026 Legislative Assembly of Orenburg Oblast election in District 5
Candidate	Party	Votes	%
Andrey Myazin	United Russia	28,118	60.62%
Sergey Lakhtin	Communist Party	5,294	11.41%
Yevgeny Grishayev	Liberal Democratic Party	3,519	7.59%
Maksim Tipikin	New People	2,815	6.07%
Aleksandr Neprokin	A Just Russia	2,675	5.77%
Sergey Popov	Party of Pensioners	1,549	3.34%
Anna Reshetnyak	Communists of Russia	1,517	3.27%
Total		46,386	100%

==== District 6 ====
Summary of the 18–20 September 2026 Legislative Assembly of Orenburg Oblast election in District 6
Candidate	Party	Votes	%
Oleg Laktionov (incumbent)	United Russia	22,670	59.70%
Artur Gafurov	Communist Party	7,232	19.04%
Lyubov Yasakova	A Just Russia	2,557	6.73%
Tatyana Panyavina	New People	2,425	6.39%
Yekaterina Safina	Communists of Russia	2,253	5.93%
Total		37,975	100%

==== District 7 ====
Summary of the 18–20 September 2026 Legislative Assembly of Orenburg Oblast election in District 7
Candidate	Party	Votes	%
Yury Tsymbalyuk	United Russia	28,224	66.61%
Vladimir Podvigin	Communist Party	3,693	8.72%
Lidia Dubovitskaya	A Just Russia	2,417	5.70%
Igor Kartsev	Liberal Democratic Party	2,262	5.34%
Andrey Gayvoronsky	Party of Pensioners	2,114	4.99%
Irina Lipunova	Communists of Russia	1,682	3.97%
Aleksey Pchelintsev	New People	1,352	3.19%
Total		42,375	100%

==== District 8 ====
Summary of the 18–20 September 2026 Legislative Assembly of Orenburg Oblast election in District 8
Candidate	Party	Votes	%
Sergey Sukmanov	United Russia	16,198	56.22%
Denis Baturin	Communist Party	5,655	19.63%
Vladislav Neverov	New People	2,309	8.01%
Olesya Vdovina	A Just Russia	1,383	4.80%
Dmitry Nazarov	Liberal Democratic Party	1,376	4.78%
Natalya Yakimushkina	Party of Pensioners	687	2.38%
Ilya Abrosimov	Communists of Russia	674	2.34%
Total		28,813	100%

==== District 9 ====
Summary of the 18–20 September 2026 Legislative Assembly of Orenburg Oblast election in District 9
Candidate	Party	Votes	%
Yelena Ivanova (incumbent)	United Russia	12,744	50.13%
Yelena Ryakhovskaya	Communist Party	3,197	12.58%
Maksim Shchepinov	Liberal Democratic Party	2,386	9.39%
Anna Gette	New People	2,120	8.34%
Dmitry Chekhov	A Just Russia	1,857	7.31%
Yelizaveta Anisova	Party of Pensioners	1,294	5.09%
Olga Fomicheva	Communists of Russia	1,087	4.28%
Total		25,420	100%

==== District 10 ====
Summary of the 18–20 September 2026 Legislative Assembly of Orenburg Oblast election in District 10
Candidate	Party	Votes	%
Akim Koval	United Russia	10,062	44.96%
Radmir Asyayev	Communist Party	3,839	17.16%
Yelena Mishustina	New People	2,572	11.49%
Yelena Bezborodova	Liberal Democratic Party	2,045	9.14%
Anna Varavina	A Just Russia	1,777	7.94%
Lilia Kochelayeva	Communists of Russia	1,365	6.10%
Total		22,378	100%

==== District 11 ====
Summary of the 18–20 September 2026 Legislative Assembly of Orenburg Oblast election in District 11
Candidate	Party	Votes	%
Yelena Afanasova	United Russia	18,137	65.27%
Aleksey Sablin	Communist Party	2,514	9.05%
Igor Somov	New People	1,987	7.15%
Yevgeny Bezruchko	A Just Russia	1,375	4.95%
Aleksandr Lysov	Liberal Democratic Party	1,235	4.44%
Yekaterina Makhmudova	Communists of Russia	1,171	4.21%
Lyubov Barsukova	Party of Pensioners	942	3.39%
Total		27,787	100%

==== District 12 ====
Summary of the 18–20 September 2026 Legislative Assembly of Orenburg Oblast election in District 12
Candidate	Party	Votes	%
Sergey Bogodukhov	United Russia	15,226	60.49%
Vladislav Nosyrev	New People	2,587	10.28%
Sergey Yangubayev	Communist Party	2,471	9.82%
Aleksandr Nabatchikov	A Just Russia	2,396	9.52%
Elvira Vovkodav	Communists of Russia	1,910	7.59%
Total		25,170	100%

==== District 13 ====
Summary of the 18–20 September 2026 Legislative Assembly of Orenburg Oblast election in District 13
Candidate	Party	Votes	%
Andrey Khavilov	United Russia	16,968	59.31%
Ivan Kolodin	Communist Party	3,293	11.51%
Pavel Khripunov	New People	2,546	8.90%
Dmitry Kalinin	A Just Russia	1,687	5.90%
Eduard Lade	Liberal Democratic Party	1,413	4.94%
Andrey Mishustin	Communists of Russia	1,067	3.73%
Aleksandr Baryshnikov	Party of Pensioners	1,032	3.61%
Total		28,610	100%

==== District 14 ====
Summary of the 18–20 September 2026 Legislative Assembly of Orenburg Oblast election in District 14
Candidate	Party	Votes	%
Aleksandr Trubnikov (incumbent)	United Russia	18,182	61.86%
Svyatoslav Shcherbakov	Communist Party	3,488	11.87%
Ildar Kaisarov	New People	2,404	8.18%
Yulia Vyachina	Party of Pensioners	1,661	5.65%
Ivan Dubinin	Liberal Democratic Party	1,635	5.56%
Svetlana Plesovskikh	A Just Russia	1,420	4.83%
Total		29,394	100%

==== District 15 ====
Summary of the 18–20 September 2026 Legislative Assembly of Orenburg Oblast election in District 15
Candidate	Party	Votes	%
Oleg Nikolayev (incumbent)	United Russia	32,147	71.27%
Dmitry Olikov	Communist Party	3,458	7.67%
Aizhan Budanova	Liberal Democratic Party	3,303	7.32%
Maksim Khvalev	New People	1,957	4.34%
Kristina Filippova	Communists of Russia	1,329	2.95%
Roman Yashnikov	A Just Russia	1,152	2.55%
Viktor Fedosov	Party of Pensioners	1,106	2.45%
Total		45,107	100%

==== District 16 ====
Summary of the 18–20 September 2026 Legislative Assembly of Orenburg Oblast election in District 16
Candidate	Party	Votes	%
Anatoly Lukyanov (incumbent)	United Russia	24,942	65.57%
Zakarya Akpayev	Communist Party	4,404	11.58%
Alyona Galeyeva	Communists of Russia	2,403	6.32%
Balzhan Mukhtubayeva	Liberal Democratic Party	1,634	4.34%
Ilfat Akhmerov	New People	1,540	4.05%
Nikolay Oplachko	A Just Russia	1,496	3.93%
Aleksandr Uzdyayev	Party of Pensioners	824	2.17%
Total		38,036	100%

==== District 17 ====
Summary of the 18–20 September 2026 Legislative Assembly of Orenburg Oblast election in District 17
Candidate	Party	Votes	%
Roman Ivasyuk	United Russia	17,123	50.35%
Saule Shintemirova	Communist Party	3,830	11.26%
Renat Gilmutdinov	New People	3,321	9.77%
Natalya Korneva	A Just Russia	2,691	7.91%
Vladimir Melnikov	Liberal Democratic Party	2,470	7.26%
Viktor Yevseyev	Party of Pensioners	1,874	5.51%
Oleg Yakunin	Communists of Russia	1,636	4.81%
Total		34,005	100%

==== District 18 ====
Summary of the 18–20 September 2026 Legislative Assembly of Orenburg Oblast election in District 18
Candidate	Party	Votes	%
Valentin Kupinov (incumbent)	United Russia	21,760	57.31%
Rustam Mingaleyev	Communist Party	6,905	18.18%
Yevgeny Chernykh	A Just Russia	3,169	8.35%
Vladimir Kott	Liberal Democratic Party	2,757	7.26%
Diana Patitseva	New People	2,428	6.39%
Total		37,971	100%

==== District 19 ====
Summary of the 18–20 September 2026 Legislative Assembly of Orenburg Oblast election in District 19
Candidate	Party	Votes	%
Anatoly Kolestinsky (incumbent)	United Russia	11,233	39.18%
Svetlana Yushkevich	Communist Party	6,341	22.12%
Konstantin Kryzhanovsky	Liberal Democratic Party	2,535	8.84%
Yury Kozhemyakin	A Just Russia	2,167	7.56%
Nina Golovina	Party of Pensioners	2,070	7.22%
Yekaterina Stoltz	New People	1,646	5.74%
Viktor Pilyukshin	Communists of Russia	1,616	5.64%
Total		28,671	100%

==== District 20 ====
Summary of the 18–20 September 2026 Legislative Assembly of Orenburg Oblast election in District 20
Candidate	Party	Votes	%
Igor Bitner	United Russia	17,562	57.77%
Olga Pikhota	New People	2,947	9.69%
Sergey Kashigin	A Just Russia	2,945	9.69%
Luiza Miftakhitdinova	Communists of Russia	2,643	8.69%
Marat Ilyasov	Liberal Democratic Party	2,029	6.67%
Konstantin Zhmakin	Party of Pensioners	1,328	4.37%
Total		30,402	100%

==== District 21 ====
Summary of the 18–20 September 2026 Legislative Assembly of Orenburg Oblast election in District 21
Candidate	Party	Votes	%
Denis Okunev	United Russia	14,907	55.79%
Natalya Akhmadulina	Liberal Democratic Party	4,648	17.39%
Viktor Derevyashkin	New People	3,349	12.53%
Nikita Chernenko	Party of Pensioners	2,578	9.65%
Total		26,721	100%

==== District 22 ====
Summary of the 18–20 September 2026 Legislative Assembly of Orenburg Oblast election in District 22
Candidate	Party	Votes	%
Igor Galkin	United Russia	24,413	66.90%
Yevgeny Klaptenko	Communist Party	2,883	7.90%
Nikolay Kornyakov	Liberal Democratic Party	2,312	6.34%
Vasily Lenkin	Communists of Russia	1,738	4.76%
Mikhail Matukhnov	A Just Russia	1,705	4.67%
Ilya Gizatulin	New People	1,500	4.11%
Natalya Yevtushenko	Party of Pensioners	1,216	3.33%
Total		36,491	100%

==== District 23 ====
Summary of the 18–20 September 2026 Legislative Assembly of Orenburg Oblast election in District 23
Candidate	Party	Votes	%
Vladimir Shevchenko (incumbent)	United Russia	30,401	65.79%
Aleksandr Nomerovchenko	Communist Party	5,769	12.48%
Aleksey Smirnov	A Just Russia	2,879	6.23%
Abai Zhankushikov	New People	2,666	5.77%
Aleksandr Butov	Party of Pensioners	2,018	4.37%
Svetlana Solodchenko	Communists of Russia	1,631	3.53%
Total		46,209	100%

=== Members ===
Incumbent deputies are highlighted with bold, elected members who declined to take a seat are marked with ~~strikethrough~~.

Constituency
No.	Member	Party
1	Ildus Davlyatov	United Russia
2	Pavel Takmakov	United Russia
3	Aleksandr Ledenyov	United Russia
4	Denis Donskov	United Russia
5	Andrey Myazin	United Russia
6	Oleg Laktionov	United Russia
7	Yury Tsymbalyuk	United Russia
8	Sergey Sukmanov	United Russia
9	Yelena Ivanova	United Russia
10	Akim Koval	United Russia
11	Yelena Afanasova	United Russia
12	Sergey Bogodukhov	United Russia
13	Andrey Khavilov	United Russia
14	Aleksandr Trubnikov	United Russia
15	Oleg Nikolayev	United Russia
16	Anatoly Lukyanov	United Russia
17	Roman Ivasyuk	United Russia
18	Valentin Kupinov	United Russia
19	Anatoly Kolestinsky	United Russia
20	Igor Bitner	United Russia
21	Denis Okunev	United Russia
22	Igor Galkin	United Russia
23	Vladimir Shevchenko	United Russia

Party lists
Member	Party
~~Yevgeny Solntsev~~	United Russia
~~Nursultan Mussagaleyev~~	United Russia
Sergey Grachyov	United Russia
Andrey Shevchenko	United Russia
Gennady Averyanov	United Russia
~~Aleksandr Shubin~~	United Russia
Sergey Salmin	United Russia
Denis Nelyubov	United Russia
Olga Khromushina	United Russia
Aleksandr Viselkov	United Russia
Aleksandr Sorokin	United Russia
Tatyana Grineva	United Russia
Nikolay Ishakov	United Russia
Svetlana Myachina	United Russia
Mikhail Partilov	United Russia
Konstantin Mironenko	United Russia
Yevgeny Malyushin	United Russia
~~Sergey Aleynikov~~	United Russia
~~Elmir Suleimanov~~	United Russia
~~Danil Kuramshin~~	United Russia
~~Darya Marchenko~~	United Russia
~~Ivan Ryndin~~	United Russia
~~Vasily Polikarpov~~	United Russia
~~Galina Abramova~~	United Russia
Marina Zorina	United Russia
Svetlana Aleshina	United Russia
Yaroslav Chirkov	United Russia
Tatyana Yeremenko	United Russia
~~Nina Ostanina~~	Communist Party
Maksim Amelin	Communist Party
~~Denis Baturin~~	Communist Party
Vladimir Yegorov	Communist Party
Radmir Asyayev	Communist Party
~~Leonid Slutsky~~	Liberal Democratic Party
~~Yelena Afanasyeva~~	Liberal Democratic Party
~~Andrey Reyzler~~	Liberal Democratic Party
Maksim Romanov	Liberal Democratic Party
Aleksey Drynov	New People
Oksana Nabatchikova	A Just Russia

== See also ==
- 2026 Russian regional elections
