= Alexei Drynov =

Russian politician (born 1995)

- Алексей Дрынов

Member of the Legislative Assembly of Orenburg Oblast
- Incumbent
- Assumed office 1 October 2026

Personal details
- Born: 21 September 1995 (age 31)
- Party: New People
- Education: Russian State University of Tourism and Services Studies
- Profession: Politician, ecologist

Alexei Georgievich Drynov (Russian: Алексей Георгиевич Дрынов; born 21 September 1995) is a Russian ecologist and politician who currently serves as a member of the Legislative Assembly of Orenburg Oblast since 1 October 2026.
