= House of Soviets =

House of Soviets (Дом советов) or House of the Soviets may refer to:

- House of Soviets (Kaliningrad), an incomplete building on the site of Königsberg Castle
- House of Soviets (Rostov-on-Don), a government building in Rostov-on-Don
- House of Soviets (Saint Petersburg), an office building
- House of the Soviets (Orenburg), headquarters of the government of Orenburg Oblast
- House of the Soviets (Veliky Novgorod), seat of the Novgorod Oblast Duma
- Budynok Rad (Kryvyi Rih Metrotram), an underground tram station in Kryvyi Rih, Ukraine
- Palace of the Soviets, a project to construct an administrative center and a congress hall in Moscow, Russia, near the Kremlin
- White House (Moscow), a government building in Moscow
