= Governor of Orenburg Oblast =

Highest-ranking official in Orenburg Oblast, Russia

- Coat of arms of Orenburg Oblast

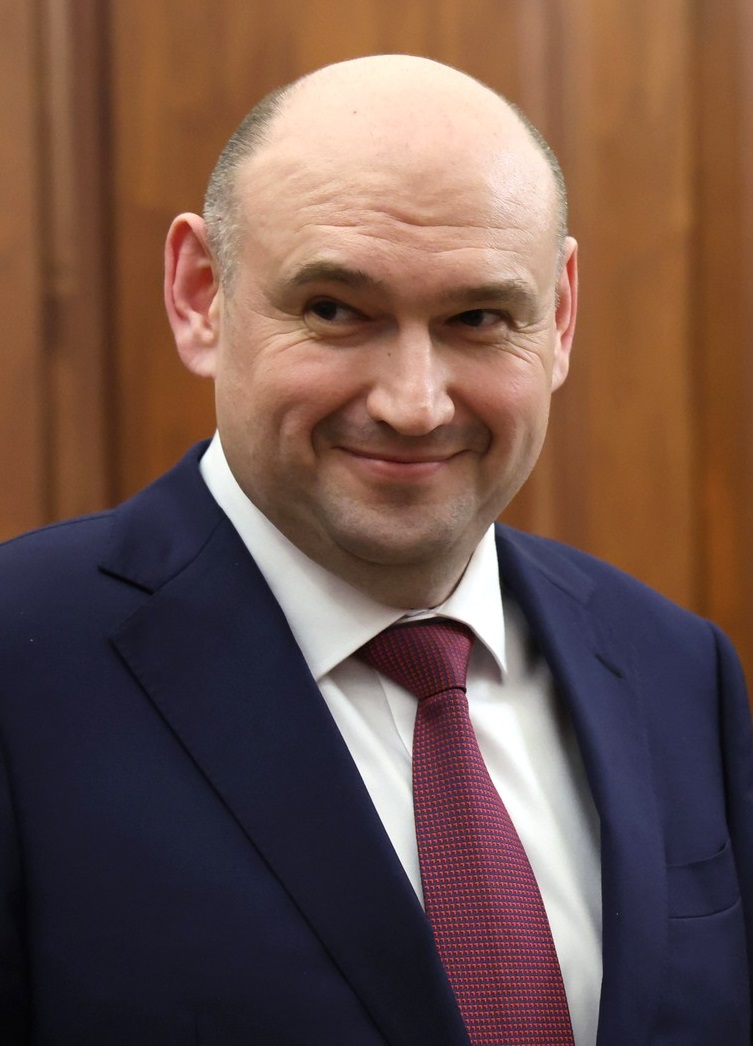
- Incumbent; Yevgeny Solntsev since 17 September 2025
- Type: Governor; Head of state; Head of government
- Seat: Orenburg
- Term length: 5 years
- Constituting instrument: Charter of Orenburg Oblast, Section 5
- Formation: 1991
- Website: orenburg-gov.ru

The Governor of Orenburg Oblast (Russian: Губернатор Оренбургской области) is the head of government of Orenburg Oblast, a federal subject of Russia.

The position was introduced in 1991 as Head of Administration of Orenburg Oblast. The Governor is elected by direct popular vote for a term of five years.

== List of officeholders ==
No.	Portrait	Governor	Tenure	Time in office	Party	Election
1		Vladimir Yelagin (born 1955)	24 October 1991 – 29 December 1999 (lost re-election)	8 years, 66 days	Independent	Appointed 1995
2		Alexey Chernyshyov (born 1939)	29 December 1999 – 15 June 2010 (term end)	10 years, 168 days	Agrarian → United Russia	1999; 2003; 2005 (Note: Appointed by the President of Russia with the consent of the Legislative Assembly.)
3		Yury Berg (born 1953)	15 June 2010 – 17 May 2014 (resigned)	8 years, 279 days	United Russia	2010
–		Yury Berg (born 1953)	17 May 2014 – 26 September 2014	8 years, 279 days	United Russia	Acting
(3)		Yury Berg (born 1953)	26 September 2014 – 21 March 2019 (resigned)	8 years, 279 days	United Russia	2014
–		Denis Pasler (born 1978)	21 March 2019 – 18 September 2019	6 years, 5 days	United Russia	Actng
4		Denis Pasler (born 1978)	18 September 2019 – 26 March 2025 (resigned)	6 years, 5 days	United Russia	2019; 2024
–		Yevgeny Solntsev (born 1980)	26 March 2025 – 17 September 2025	1 year, 165 days	United Russia	Acting
5		Yevgeny Solntsev (born 1980)	17 September 2025 – present	1 year, 165 days	United Russia	2025
