= Andriy Shevchenko (disambiguation) =

Andriy Shevchenko (born 1976) is a Ukrainian football manager and former player.

Andriy Shevchenko may also refer to:

- Andrey Shevchenko (politician) (born 1965), Russian politician
- Andriy Shevchenko (politician) (born 1976), Ukrainian journalist, politician and ambassador.
