= Andrey Chertkov =

Russian politician (born 1969)

- Андрей Чертков
- Chertkov in March 2026

Prime Minister of the Donetsk People's Republic
- Incumbent
- Assumed office 30 June 2025
- Preceded by: Yevgeny Solntsev

Personal details
- Born: 9 April 1969 (age 57) Shatki, Nizhny Novgorod Oblast, Soviet Union
- Party: United Russia
- Education: Nizhny Novgorod State Pedagogical University

Military service
- Branch/service: Soviet Army
- Years of service: 1987-1989

Andrey Gennadyevich Chertkov (Russian: Андрей Геннадьевич Чертков; born 9 April 1969) is a Russian politician.

== Life and career ==
Chertkov was born 9 April 1969 in Shatki, Nizhny Novgorod Oblast. He graduated from Nizhny Novgorod State Pedagogical University with a degree in physics and astronomy.

He served in the Soviet Army between 1987 and 1989, where he was stationed in the Polish People's Republic.

From 3 August 2016 to 22 March 2017, he served as the Deputy Minister of Energy and Housing and Communal Services of Nizhny Novgorod Oblast. From 22March 2017 to 7 October 2020 he served as the Minister of Energy and Housing and Communal Services.

Following the Russian invasion of Ukraine, Chertkov was appointed Minister of Coal and Energy of the Donetsk People's Republic, a position he held between 2 July 2022 to 16 May 2023.

He held the position of First Deputy Chairman of the Government of the Donetsk People's Republic between 16 May 2023 to 25 March 2025. Since 26 March 2025, he has been the Acting Chairman of the Government of the Donetsk People's Republic.

== Sanctions ==
On September 29, 2022, against the background of Russia's invasion of Ukraine, Canada was included in the sanctions list of "accomplices of the regime" and sanctions were imposed on officials in the territories of Ukraine occupied by Russia "for facilitating and supporting President Putin's fictitious referendums". He was also sanctioned by New Zealand and the United Kingdom.
