= Nina Ostanina =

Russian Communist politician (born 1955)

Nina Ostanina MP
- Нина Останина
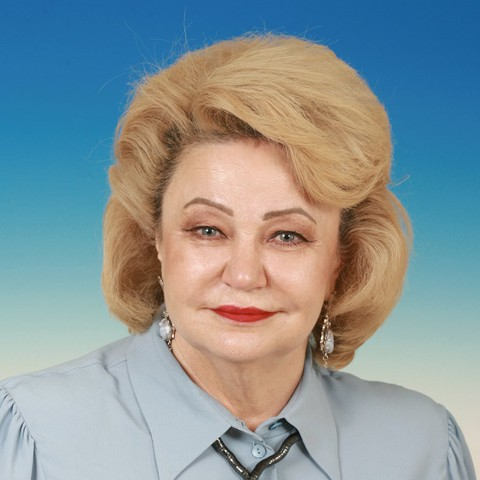

Chairman of the State Duma committee on Family Protection, Fatherhood, Motherhood and Childhood
- Incumbent
- Assumed office 12 October 2021
- Preceded by: Tamara Pletnyova

Deputy of the State Duma Russia
- Incumbent
- Assumed office 17 January 1996
- Preceded by: Nina Volkova
- Constituency: Prokopyevsk (No. 91); Orenburg Oblast; Samara Oblast; Ulyanovsk Oblast

Personal details
- Born: 26 December 1955 (age 70) Kolpakovo, Topchikhinsky District, Altai Krai, Russian SFSR, Soviet Union
- Party: CPRF
- Spouse: Igor Grigorievich Ostanin
- Children: Daniil; Evgeniy
- Education: Altai State University
- Occupation: Teacher

Nina Alexandrovna Ostanina (Russian: Нина Александровна Останина; born 26 December 1955) is a Russian Communist politician. She has been Chairman of the State Duma Russia committee on Family Protection, Fatherhood, Motherhood and Childhood since 12 October 2021.

Ostanina was formerly Secretary of the Kemerovo regional Communist party organization.

== Early life and education ==
Ostanina was born on December 26, 1955, in the village of Pobedim, near the village of Kolpakovo, Topchikha District, Altai Krai. According to her, the name of her small homeland became her life's motto. She graduated from the village school with honors and entered the newly opened Altai State University in Barnaul. In 1978, she graduated from the history department.

In 2006, at the Academy of Labor and Social Relations, she defended her dissertation for Candidate of Sociological Sciences, “Russian youth in the labor market: social and managerial aspects”.

== Early career ==
Ostanina worked for 6 years as a history and social sciences teacher at the Altai Medical Institute. While working at the university, Ostanina joined the Communist Party of the Soviet Union (CPSU).

In 1983, she moved with her family to the Kemerovo Oblast region. There, she worked as the head of the political education office at the Ziminka mine in Prokopyevsk, as a lecturer for the city committee of the CPSU, and at the Siberian Mining and Metallurgical Academy in Novokuznetsk.

== Political career ==
In late 1993, Ostanina became one of the organizers of the regional bloc of Aman Tuleyev's supporters, People's Power, and from 1994 to 1999, she was a member of the association's leadership.

From 1994 to 1995, she served as assistant to Aman Tuleyev, Chairman of the Legislative Assembly of Kemerovo Oblast. In 1995, she was elected to the 2nd State Duma, where she was a member of the People's Power parliamentary group, a member of the Committee on Federation Affairs and Regional Policy, and then deputy chair of the Committee on Women, Family, and Youth Affairs.

She unsuccessfully ran for governor of Kemerovo Oblast in the 1997 Russian gubernatorial elections.

In 1999 (and again in 2003), she was elected in the Prokopyevsk single-mandate constituency, after being nominated by the Communist Party of the Russian Federation (CPRF).

In the 3rd State Duma (2000-2003), she served as a member of the Agro-Industrial Group and deputy chairperson of the Committee on Women, Family, and Youth Affairs.

In the 4th State Duma (2003-2007), she served as a member of the CPRF and the Committee on Women, Family, and Youth Affairs.

In June 2004, Ostanina created and led the public movement "Communists for Kuzbass!"

In December 2004, she was elected as First Secretary of the Kemerovo Regional Committee of the CPRF. She also served as a member of the Committee for the Salvation of Kuzbass.

In 2007, she was elected as a deputy of the 5th State Duma after being nominated by the CPRF.

In 2010, she began criticizing Aman Tuleyev, which angered many of her former supporters. Ostanina herself attributed the incident to ideological differences between the CPRF and United Russia. In August 2011, she resigned as First Secretary of the Kemerovo Regional Committee of the CPRF and transferred to the Central Committee. She ran for 6th State Duma as the CPRF's second candidate from Stavropol Krai but failed to win a seat. She also failed to win a seat in the 2016 election for 7th State Duma, running in the 40th Rubtsovsky single-mandate constituency (Altai Krai).

She unsuccessfully contested the Rubtsovsk constituency at the 2016 Russian legislative election.

In the 2018 Russian presidential election, she served as a representative of candidate Pavel Grudinin.

In the 2021 7th State Duma elections, she was nominated as a candidate in the Moscow district by the CPRF and took third place with 10.12% of the votes. She was then elected as a deputy by the CPRF party for the Orenburg, Samara, and Ulyanovsk region and chairperson of the Committee on Family, Women, and Children.

Ostanina was reported as a potential candidate in the 2025 Orenburg Oblast gubernatorial election for the 8th State Duma (2021-2026)

In the 2026 Orenburg Oblast legislative election, she was nominated by the CPRF for deputy and elected to the 9th State Duma (2026- ). She was also re-elected as chairperson of the Committee for Family Protection, Fatherhood, Motherhood, and Childhood.

== Views and policies ==
=== Family policies and domestic violence laws ===
In July 2022, Ostanina co-sponsored a bill that would ban "the denial of family values" and the promotion of "non-traditional sexual orientations." In an interview, she further stated that "a traditional family is a union of a man and woman, it’s children, it’s a multi-generational family."

She opposes the adoption of a separate law on the prevention of domestic violence and the criminalization of domestic battery. Ostanina stated that punishment for domestic battery would discourage young people from marrying, increase the divorce rate, and run counter to the goal of increasing the birth rate. According to Ostanina, men will fear that any touching of their wives could be interpreted as violence after women impulsively report domestic violence to the police.

=== Pursuit of quad bikes ===
In October 2024, Ostanina, as chair of the State Duma Committee on Family Protection, Fatherhood, Motherhood, and Childhood, during a meeting with children from Luhansk, recommended that schoolchildren harass quad bikers by "film[ing] them and ridicul[ing] them."

Speaking about the hobby of children interested in quad bikes, she explained that they "want to be the center of attention" and they cannot find another way to achieve that attention because "they do not yet have the intelligence".

In response to Ostanina's proposal, LDPR State Duma deputy Valery Seleznev harshly criticized her recommendation as a call for bullying, noting that victims of such bullying suffer psychological trauma that leads to various deviations, including suicide, aggressive behavior, and the desire to injure or kill their bullies.

In response to a barrage of criticism, Ostanina stated that she had been subjected to a “swarm” information attack “following the pattern of Joseph Nye and other specialists in information attacks and color revolutions”.

As noted by the RTVI publication, Ostanina is one of the co-authors of the bill on combating bullying in schools, which was planned to be introduced to the State Duma before the end of 2024, and in September 2024, she stood up for the quadro-racing girl, whose hobby was condemned from the stage by the singer Mia Boyka , noting that if the quadro-racing girl continues to be “condemned in the public space,” then this could “deal a blow to the psyche”.

=== Animal control ===
In February 2025, after a 9-year-old girl in Stavropol Krai was mauled to death by a pack of stray dogs, she headed a Duma working group opposing the trap–neuter–vaccinate–return system, which would prevent local authorities from releasing captured stray animals back on the street and give them the power to kill the strays if necessary. This led to a number of protests by animal rights activists in many Russian cities. In April, she co-authored a bill prohibiting advertising for "mystic practices, energy healing, and spiritual counselling".

== Sanctions ==
Ostanina was one of the 324 members of the State Duma sanctioned by the United States Treasury in March 2022 in response to the 2022 Russian invasion of Ukraine.

She was sanctioned by the UK government in 2022 in relation to the Russo-Ukrainian War.

Later, on similar grounds, she was included in the sanctions lists of the United Kingdom, Switzerland, Australia, Japan, Ukraine, and New Zealand.

== Family ==
While still a student, she married Igor Grigorievich Ostanin. In the 2000s, he worked as a staff member in the State Duma of the Russian Federation. The couple has two adult sons, Daniil and Evgeny.

In 2010, Daniil's son (born 1982) appeared in court for the aggravated murder of his business partner, M. Mil'shtein, who he stabbed 42 times. After confirming the victim's death, D. Ostanin fled the scene and left Moscow. The following day, he was detained on a long-distance train from Moscow to Barnaul in Chuvashia. The motive for the murder was a quarrel over financial debts. Local media recalled the criminal case opened against D. Ostanin under Article 165 of the Criminal Code of the Russian Federation (causing property damage by deception or abuse of trust) . He admitted his guilt and in 2012 was sentenced to 12.5 years' imprisonment in a maximum security penal colony .
