= Oksana Nabatchikova =

Russian politician (born 1972)

- Оксана Набатчикова
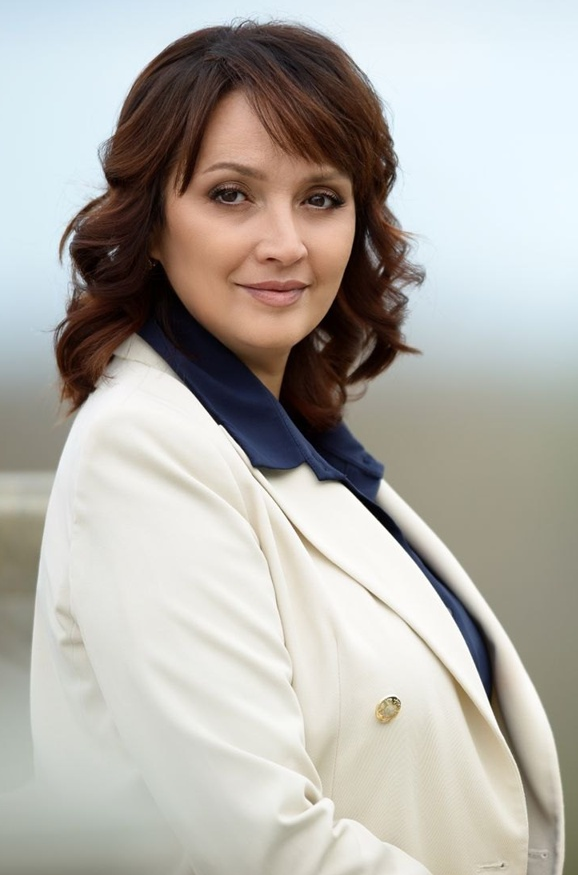

Member of the Legislative Assembly of Orenburg Oblast
- Incumbent
- Assumed office 18 September 2016

Personal details
- Born: 17 October 1972 (age 53)
- Party: A Just Russia

Oksana Valerevna Nabatchikova (Russian: Оксана Набатчикова) (born 17 October 1972) is a Russian politician from A Just Russia. She is a member of the Legislative Assembly of Orenburg Oblast. She was a candidate for Buguruslan constituency at the 2021 Russian legislative election. She is a candidate in the 2026 Orenburg Oblast legislative election.
