= Kolpakovo =

Kolpakovo Колпаково
- Village
- Location within Vladimir Oblast Location within Russia
- Coordinates: 56°25′N 38°38′E
- Country: Russia
- Region: Vladimir Oblast
- District: Alexandrovsky District
- Time zone: UTC+3:00

Kolpakovo (Russian: Колпаково) is a rural locality (a village) in Slednevskoye Rural Settlement, Alexandrovsky District, Vladimir Oblast, Russia. The population was 9 as of 2010. There are 2 streets.

== Geography ==
Kolpakovo is located 8 km northwest of Alexandrov (the district's administrative centre) by road. Monastyrevo is the nearest rural locality.
