= Andrey Shevchenko (politician) =

Russian statesman and politician

- Андрей Шевченко
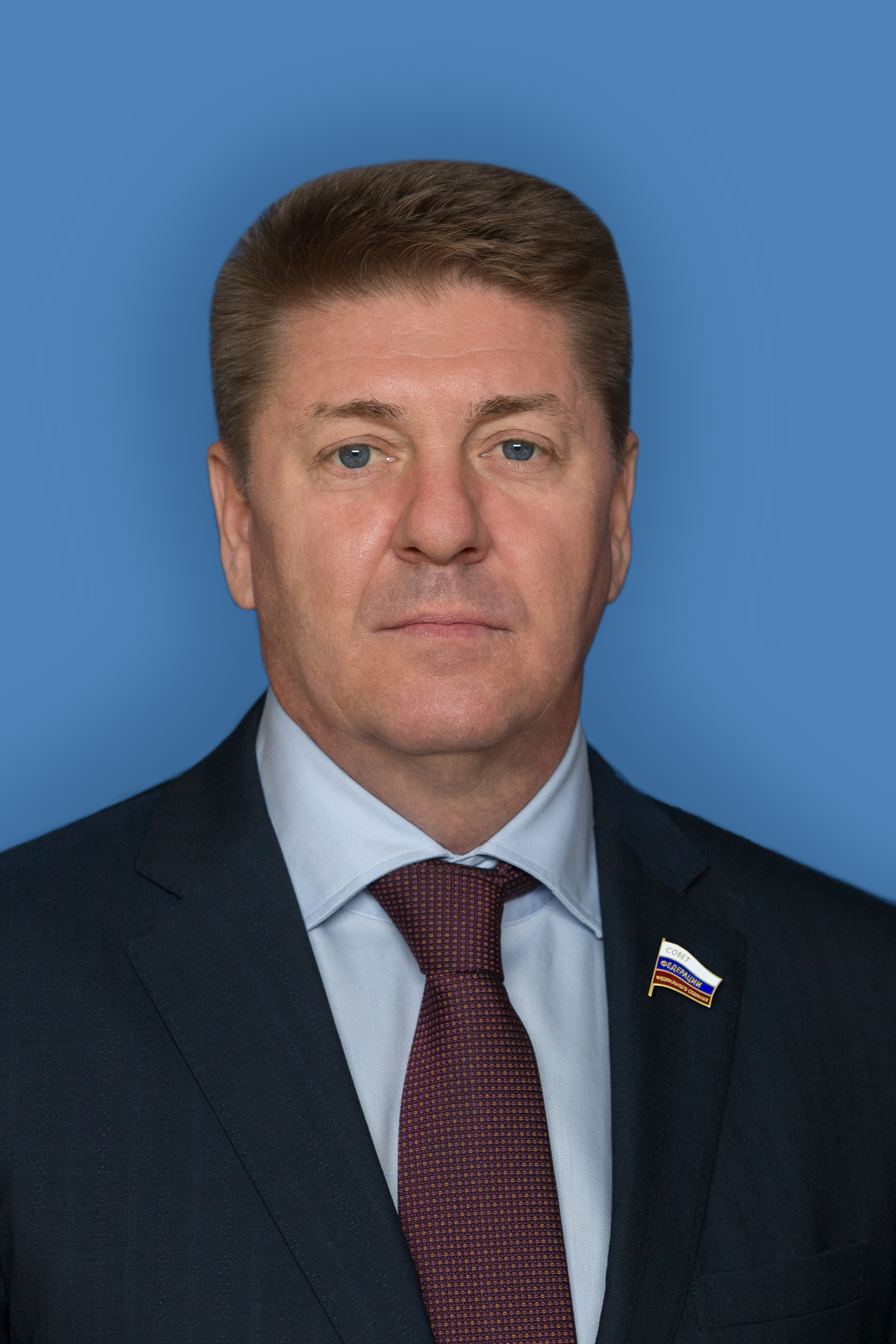

Russian Federation Senator from Orenburg Oblast
- Incumbent
- Assumed office 27 September 2016
- Preceded by: Nikolay Pozhitkov

Chairman of the Orenburg City Council
- In office September 2015 – 27 September 2016
- Preceded by: Yury Mischuryakov
- Succeeded by: Olga Berezneva

Deputy Head of Orenburg
- In office October 2010 – September 2015

Chairman of the Orenburg City Council
- In office 2004 – October 2010
- Preceded by: Yury Mischuryakov
- Succeeded by: Yury Mischuryakov

Personal details
- Born: Sergey Anatolyevich Shevchenko; 29 May 1965 (age 61) Dmitrovsky, Orenburg Oblast, Russian SFSR, Soviet Union
- Party: United Russia

Andrey Anatolyevich Shevchenko (Russian: Андрей Анатольевич Шевченко; born 29 May 1965) is a Russian politician, who is currently the senator of legislative authority of Orenburg Oblast in the Federation Council since 27 September 2016, and is the Chairman of the Federation Council Committee on the Federal Structure, Regional Policy, Local Self-Government and Affairs of the North.

Shevchenko has been under personal EU sanctions since 9 March 2022.

== Biography ==
Andrey Shevchenko was born on 29 May 1965 to the family of a rural teacher and machine operator. He began his career in 1982, after graduating from school, as a worker at a machine-building plant. From 1984 to 1986 he served in the ranks of Soviet Army. After serving in the army, he entered the economics department of the Orenburg Agricultural Institute. In 1991, after graduating with honors from the institute, he remained to work as a teacher at the Department of Economic Theory.

From 1994 to 1998, Shevchenko was CFO of an investment company, then in senior positions in production. In 1998, Shevchenko has served as the First Deputy General Director of OAO Meat Plant Orenburg. Until 1999, he was the General Director of the Orenburg Rubber Products Plant. From 1999 to 2004, he was the Chief Engineer and First Deputy General Director of the Strela Production Association in Orenburg.

In 2000, Shevchenko was elected a member of the Orenburg City Council, and went on to be returned four times in a row. Twice in 2004 and in 2015, he was elected the Chairman of the Orenburg City Council. From October 2010 to September 2015, Shevchenko was the Deputy Head of Orenburg. From 2006 to 2011, he headed the Judo and Sambo Federation of the Orenburg Region. On 27 September 2016, he was elected to the Legislative Assembly of Orenburg Oblast and was then appointed as the assembly's representative to the Federation Council. On 20 October 2021, he was elected Chairman of the Federation Council Committee on Federal Structure, Regional Policy, Local Self-Government and Northern Affairs.

== Family ==
Shevchenko is married and has a daughter.
