= Yevgeny Solntsev =

Russian politician

- Евгений Солнцев
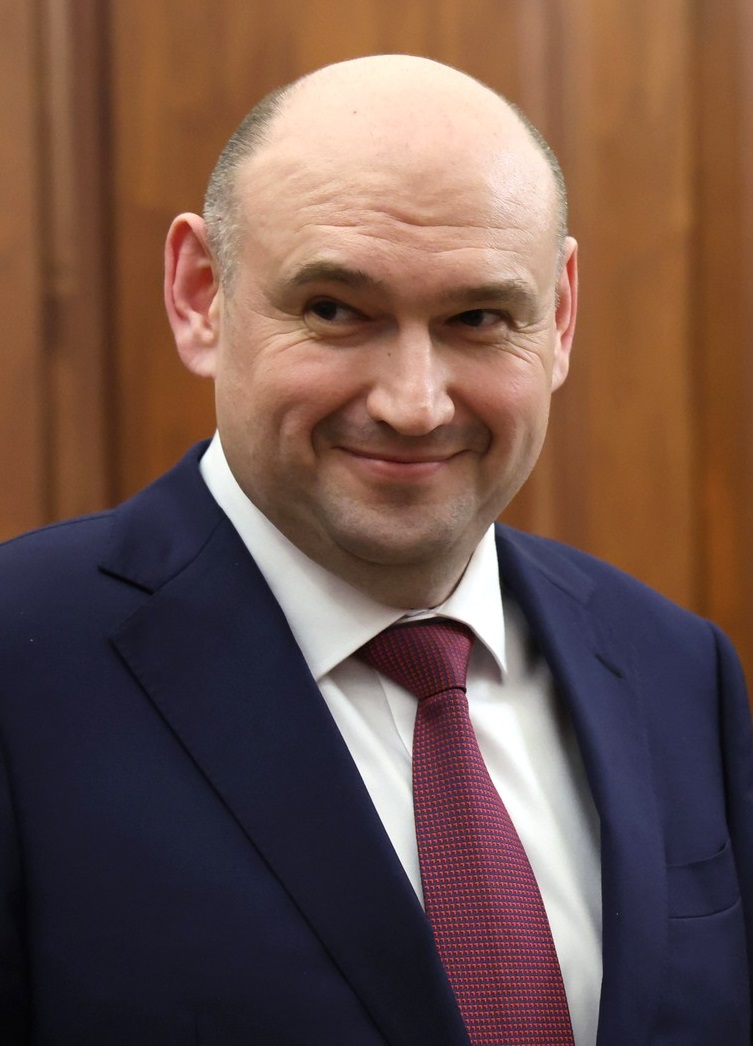
- Solntsev in 2025

Governor of Orenburg Oblast
- Incumbent
- Assumed office 17 September 2025; Acting: 26 March – 17 September 2025
- Preceded by: Denis Pasler

Prime Minister of the Donetsk People's Republic
- In office 30 March 2023 – 26 March 2025
- Governor: Denis Pushilin
- Preceded by: Vitaliy Khotsenko
- Succeeded by: Andrey Chertkov

First Deputy Prime Minister of the Donetsk People's Republic
- In office 8 June 2022 – 29 March 2023
- Prime Minister: Vitaliy Khotsenko
- Preceded by: Office established

Personal details
- Born: 28 September 1980 (age 46) Voronezh, Russian SFSR, Soviet Union
- Education: Voronezh State Institute of Architecture and Civil Engineering; Moscow State University of Civil Engineering
- Awards: Order of Honour, Russian Federation Presidential Certificate of Honour

Yevgeny Aleksandrovich Solntsev (Russian: Евгений Александрович Солнцев; born 28 September 1980) is a Russian politician who serves as governor of Orenburg Oblast since September 2025. He previously served as Prime Minister of the Donetsk People's Republic from 2023 to 2025 and First Deputy Prime Minister from 2022 to 2023. Prior to entering politics, he was a railways manager.

== Biography ==
=== Early life and education ===
Solntsev was born in 1980 in Voronezh in the Voronezh Oblast.

In 2002, he graduated from the Voronezh State Institute of Architecture and Civil Engineering with a degree in industrial and civil construction, and in 2010, he completed his postgraduate studies at the Moscow State University of Civil Engineering (MGSU). Solntsev is a Candidate of Technical Sciences. In 2010, he defended his dissertation at Moscow State University of Civil Engineering on the topic "Methodological foundations for the territorial and spatial development of objects of Olympic settlements (on the example of the transport infrastructure of the Olympic objects in Sochi)". After graduation, he worked as a foreman.

=== Railway career ===
From February 2004 to February 2006, he was deputy head, then deputy manager of the Zheldortrest construction and installation trust (a branch of Russian Railways).

From July 2006 to August 2007, he was the head of the project management of State Unitary Enterprise No. 2 of the specialized bureau for the implementation of project management methods at Roszheldorstroy OJSC.

In August 2007, he was appointed deputy construction manager – head of the construction department of Spetsmostotrest (a branch of Roszheldorstroy).

From February to July 2008, he was the head of the production and technical department of OJSC Roszheldorstroy.

From July 2008 to June 2014, he was the head of the customer service for the construction of railway transport facilities on the Black Sea coast of southern Russia (a structural subdivision of the directorate for the comprehensive reconstruction of railways and the construction of railway transport facilities of Russian Railways).

In July 2014, he took the position of head of the customer's Irkutsk group for the construction of railway transport facilities of the Directorate of Russian Railways.

From September 2015 to August 2016, he worked as Deputy Head of the Directorate for the Comprehensive Reconstruction of Railways and the Construction of Railway Transport Facilities of Russian Railways for the Development of the Baikal-Amur Mainline.

In September 2016, he was appointed head of the directorate for the comprehensive reconstruction of railways and the construction of railway transport facilities (a branch of Russian Railways).

Subsequently, he worked as an assistant to the Minister of Construction and Housing and Communal Services of the Russian Federation.

=== Political career ===
On 8 June 2022 Yevgeny Solntsev was appointed Deputy Prime Minister of the Donetsk People's Republic by Vitaliy Khotsenko. On 11 November of the same year, he took the post of First Deputy Prime Minister of the DPR. Supervises the sphere of territorial development, housing policy, construction, housing and communal services, transport of the region, etc.

On 30 March 2023, Denis Pushilin, Acting Head of the Donetsk People's Republic, appointed Solntsev head of the government of the DPR by his decree. The former prime minister, Vitaliy Khotsenko, was appointed acting governor of the Omsk Oblast on 29 March. On 26 March 2025, Solntsev was appointed as acting governor of Orenburg Oblast.

== Awards ==
Solntsev was awarded the Order of Honour (2014), Russian Federation Presidential Certificate of Honour (2018).
