= House of the Soviets (Orenburg) =

Coordinates: 51.7672°N 55.0958°E

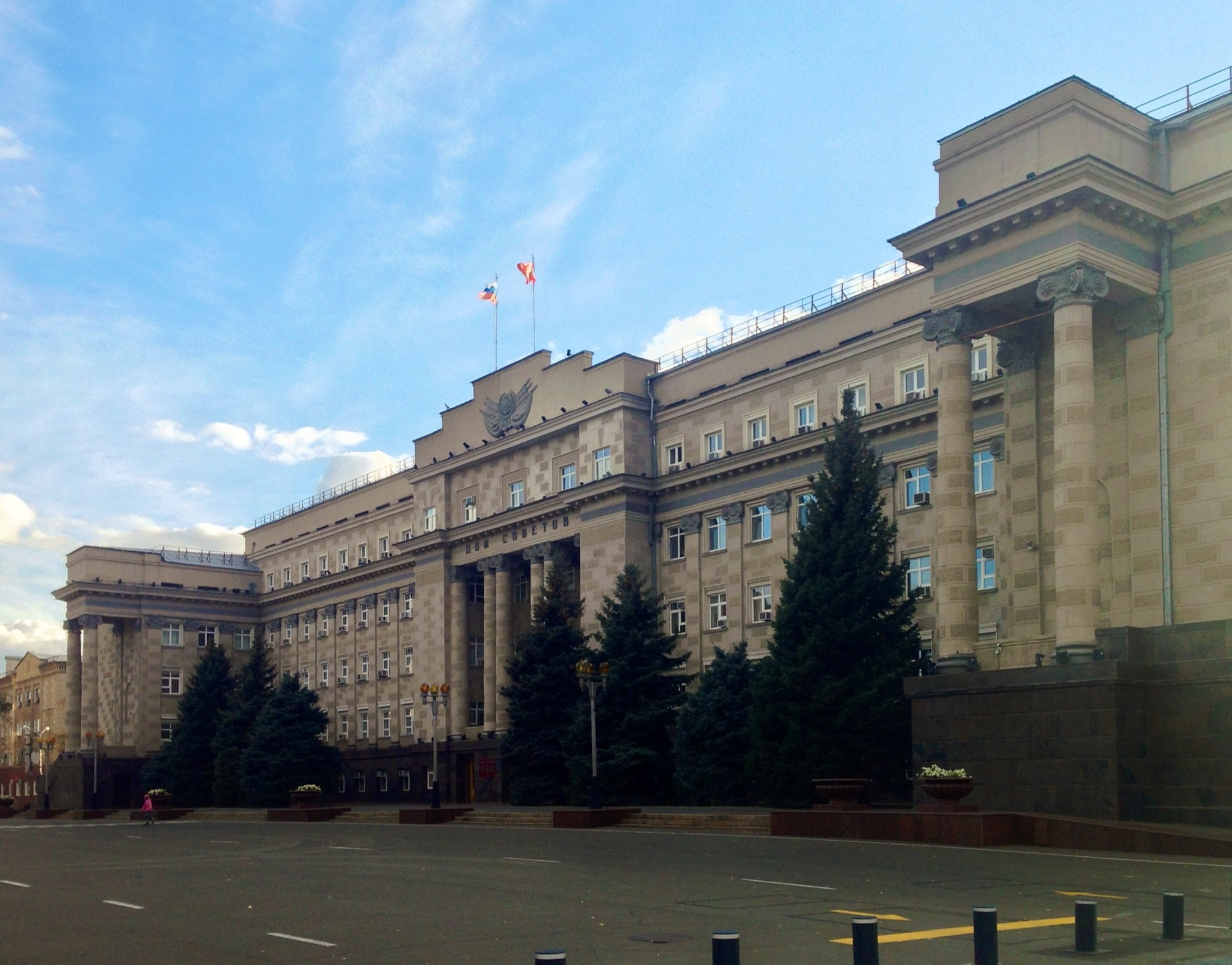
- Interactive map of the House of the Soviets area
- Alternative names: Orenburg White House

General information
- Architectural style: Stalinist, stripped classical
- Location: 460000, Lenin Square, Orenburg, Russia
- Current tenants: government of Orenburg Oblast
- Construction started: 1930s
- Completed: 1930s
- Owner: government of Orenburg Oblast

The House of the Soviets (Russian: Дом Советов) is the headquarters of the government of Orenburg Oblast and the governor of the oblast.

== History ==
The House of the Soviets is in Orenburg, the oblast's capital. It is a historic and cultural monument of the peoples of the Russian Federation under the number 5600042000.

House is located in Lenin Square. In the front is park with a fountain and a statue of Lenin.

House was built in the 1930s for the soviets (governmental councils). The house has 5 floors and a cour d'honneur. The walls were built from bricks.

The building is also home to the oblast's:

- Ministry of Finance
- Ministry of Economic Development
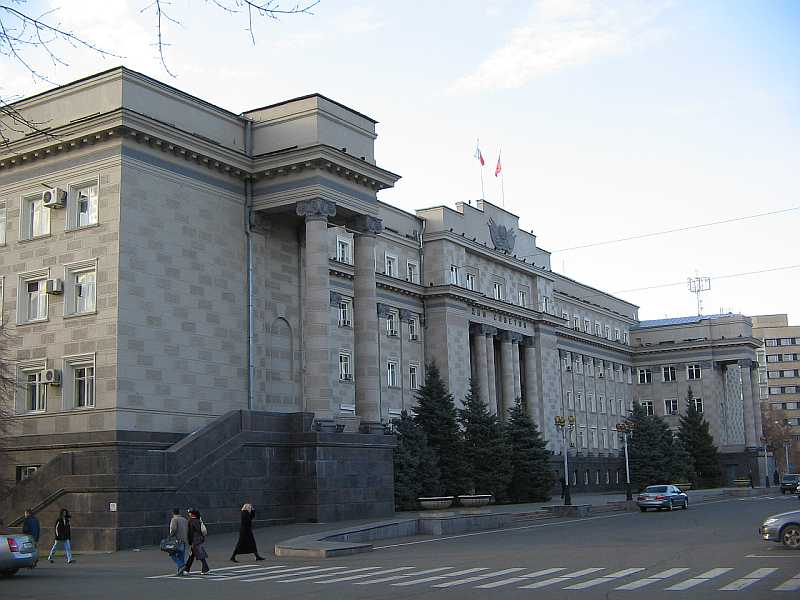

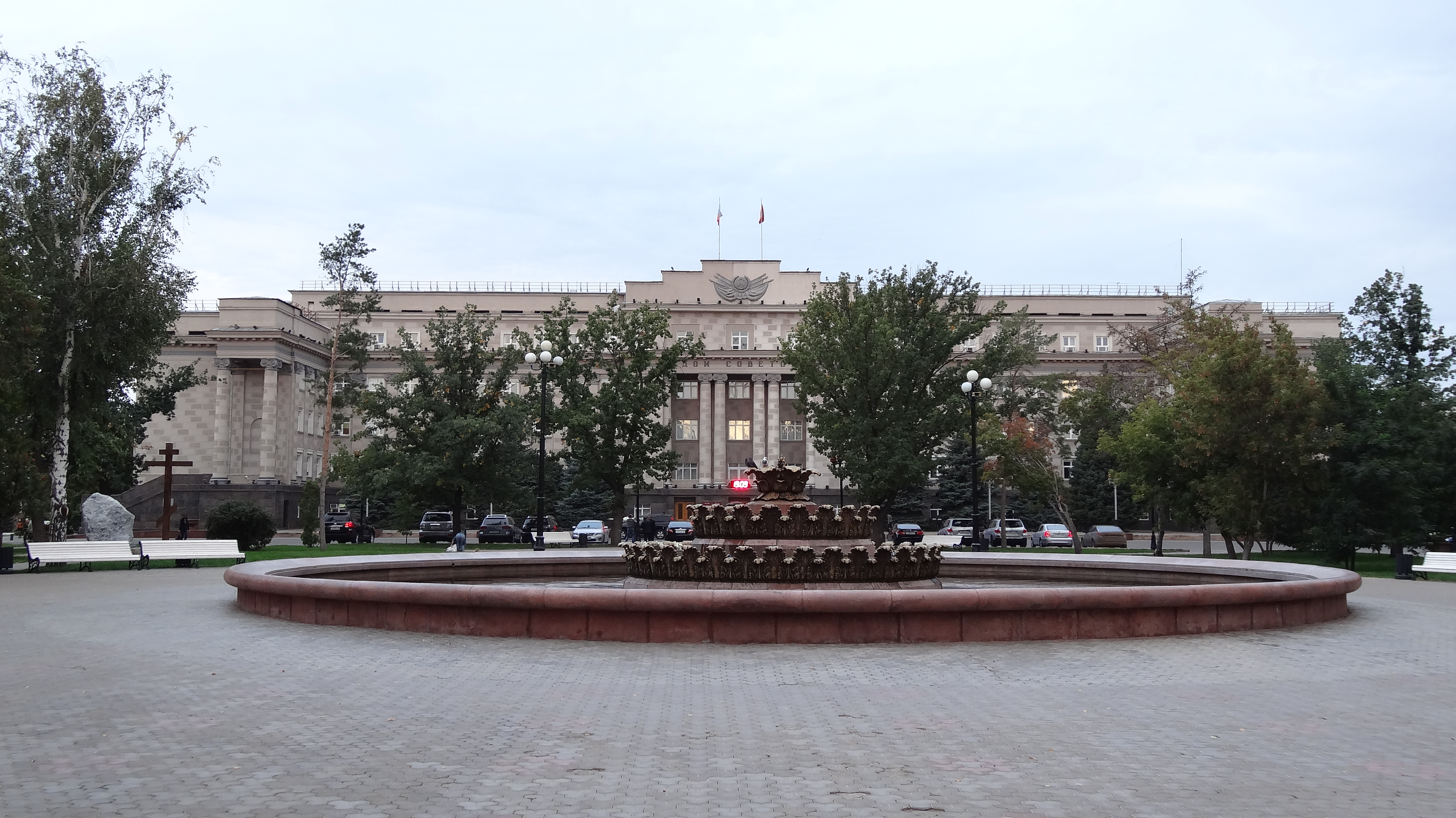
Fountain. View from a park.

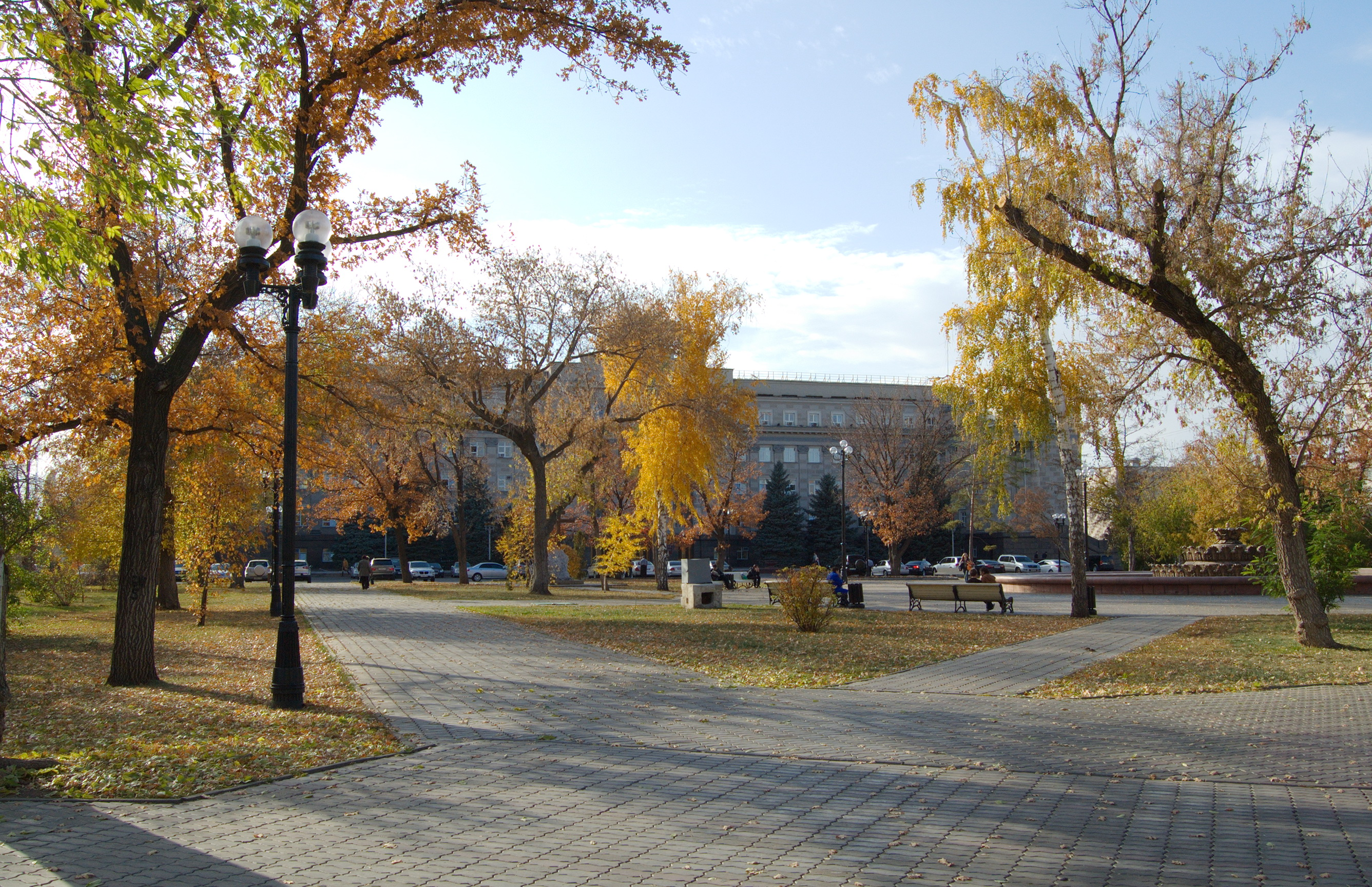
The park before the House in autumn

== See also ==
- Court Building in Orenburg
