= Orsk Dam collapse =

2024 dam failure in Russia

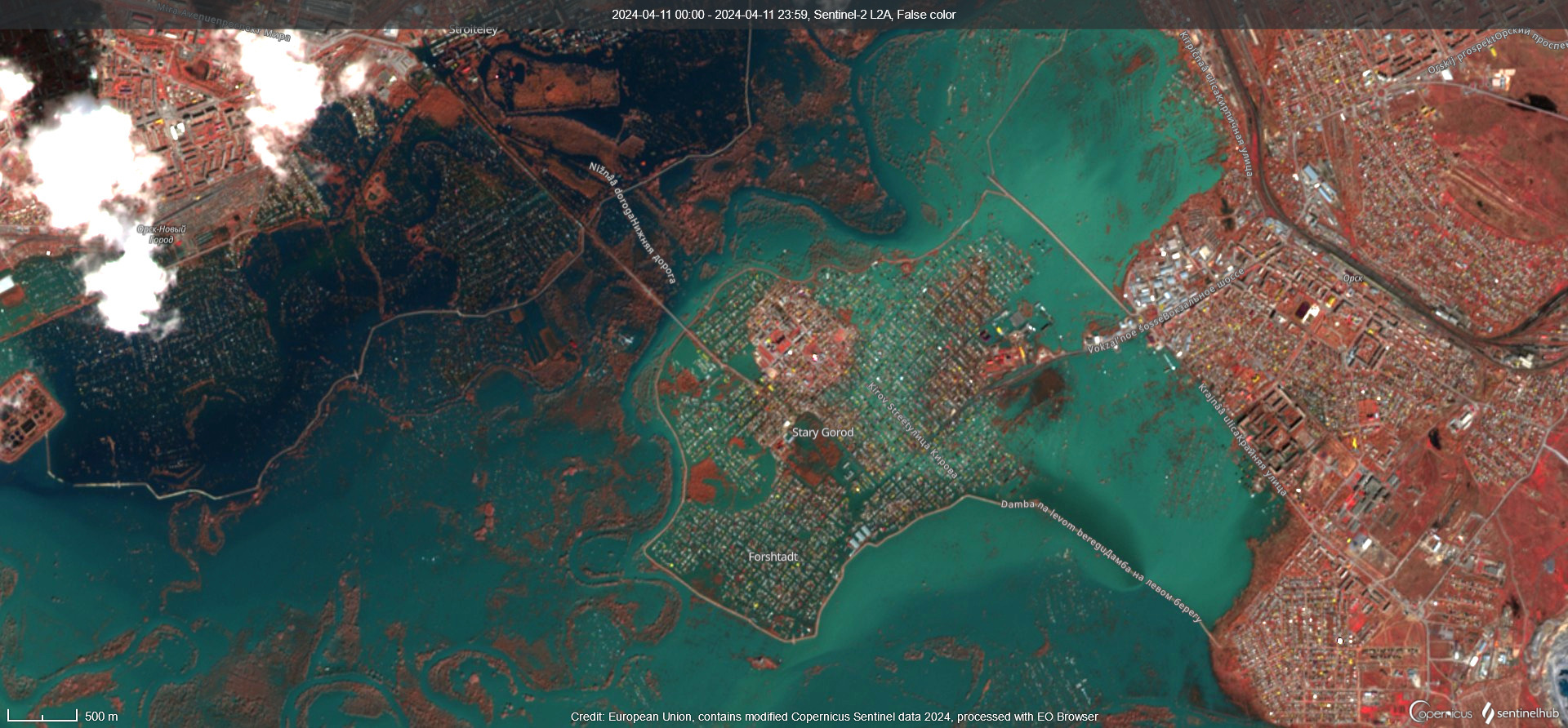
- Satellite image of the city of Orsk during the flood (as of 11 April 2024)
- Date: April 5 (dam collapse)
- Duration: April 2024
- Deaths: 15
- Injuries: 9
- Missing: 2

On 5 April 2024, the Orsk Dam in Russia collapsed due to flooding along the Ural River, prompting evacuations. Fifteen people died, while at least six others were injured and damage was estimated to be around 1.2 billion rubles (US$12.9 million).

== Background ==
The Orsk Dam was built in 2010 for a water level of 5.5 metres (18 ft). At the time of its collapse, torrential rain was recorded in the area, while melting snow helped push water levels in the Ural River to 9.6 metres (31 ft).

== Collapse ==
The Orsk Dam collapsed in the evening of 5 April, causing evacuations. Officials in the downstream city of Orsk said that the situation was rapidly worsening, and the President of Kazakhstan, Kassym-Jomart Tokayev called it the country's worst natural disaster in the last 80 years. The governor of Orenburg Oblast, Denis Pasler, also described the floods as the worst to hit the region in its history. In Orsk, areas heavily affected by the flooding included the Old Town, Nikel and Lesotorgovy. The dam was again breached on 6 and 7 April.

On 7 April, the Russian government declared a federal emergency as the Orsk oil refinery shut down, adding that flooding was also expected in Kurgan and Tyumen Oblasts. Some estimate that the floods caused about $227 million in damages. The Federal Service for Hydrometeorology and Environmental Monitoring said that the water levels in Orenburg city could dangerous levels in the next three days. The government also said that the local hydraulic stations showed an "abnormal increase in water levels" not seen in 100 years. Orenburg's mayor Sergei Salmin also threatened to implement forced evacuations. Elsewhere in Orenburg Oblast, 127 people were evacuated after floods inundated 304 homes in Buzuluk, while in Buzuluksky District, a bridge over the Borovka River was washed away, isolating settlements in the Buzuluksky Bor National Park. A separate dam was breached in Novotroitsk, prompting evacuations.

On 8 April, hundreds of people protested against the local authorities in Orsk, accusing them of having built a poorly constructed dam for too much money. Protesters shouted "shame, shame" and "Putin, help us". The mayor of Orsk, Vasiliy Kozupitsa, met with residents and promised to provide financial support to flood victims, and increase security to prevent theft in the affected areas of the city. The Insider reported that many flood victims complained of robberies by marauders, despite the promises by the authorities in Orsk to increase security in the city. Residents and volunteers said that the security promised earlier by the authorities was instead used to protect the city's government buildings and politicians from protestors rather than residential areas from robberies.

On 10 April, mayor Salmin published a warning on his Telegram channel that at 19:00 local time, sirens will ring throughout Orenburg to warn citizens to evacuate due to the water levels likely reaching the predicted peak of 930 centimetres (30.5 ft), risking the flooding of areas beyond Orsk. More than 300 residences in the city were flooded. Mass evacuations in the Orenburg were ordered on 12 April after Salmin warned that flooding in the city was expected to peak on that day before receding in the following week. By then, more than 7,500 properties in the city had been flooded.

== Damage and casualties ==
Footage from the flood

The failure of the Orsk Dam caused over 1 billion rubles in damage, and 10,000 homes were flooded. Over 4,000 people were evacuated from the area. The Russian government declared a federal emergency. There were also reports of 15 schools being flooded and three children and six adults being injured, but not severely. Authorities said they expected the flood to reach its peak on 9 April before "stabilising" after 20 April.

Four people were initially reported to have died. However, the Russian health ministry later clarified that the fatalities had "nothing to do with the floods". On 17 April, the Russian investigative news outlet iStories reported that six people had died from the floods in Orsk while another died in Orenburg, citing relatives of the victims who also accused authorities of withholding the circumstances of their deaths to avoid making compensation payments.

In March 2025, an Emergency Situations Ministry report found that 15 people had died in the floods.

== Reactions ==
Presidential spokesperson Dmitry Peskov said that President Vladimir Putin had no plans to visit the area, adding that Putin was instead "getting information and co-ordinated the work of all branches of authorities".

On 8 April, residents of Orsk staged protests in the city's central square over insufficient compensation provided by the local government for damages and the failure to fix the structural deficiencies of the dam. Demonstrators also appealed for an intervention from President Putin, who ordered a government commission to oversee the response to the disaster and deployed Emergencies Minister Aleksandr Kurenkov to Orenburg Oblast. In response, the governor of Orenburg Oblast, Denis Pasler, promised to provide monthly compensation payments of 10,000 rubles (approximately $108) for six months to displaced residents. The Investigative Committee of Russia also opened a criminal investigation into the collapse focusing on violations of construction safety regulations and negligence. Vaccinations against hepatitis A were also conducted.

North Korean leader Kim Jong Un offered his condolences and said that "Our people will always be with the Russian people."
