= Yelena Afanasyeva (politician) =

Russian politician (born 1975)

Yelena Vladimirovna Afanasyeva
- Елена Владимировна Афанасьева
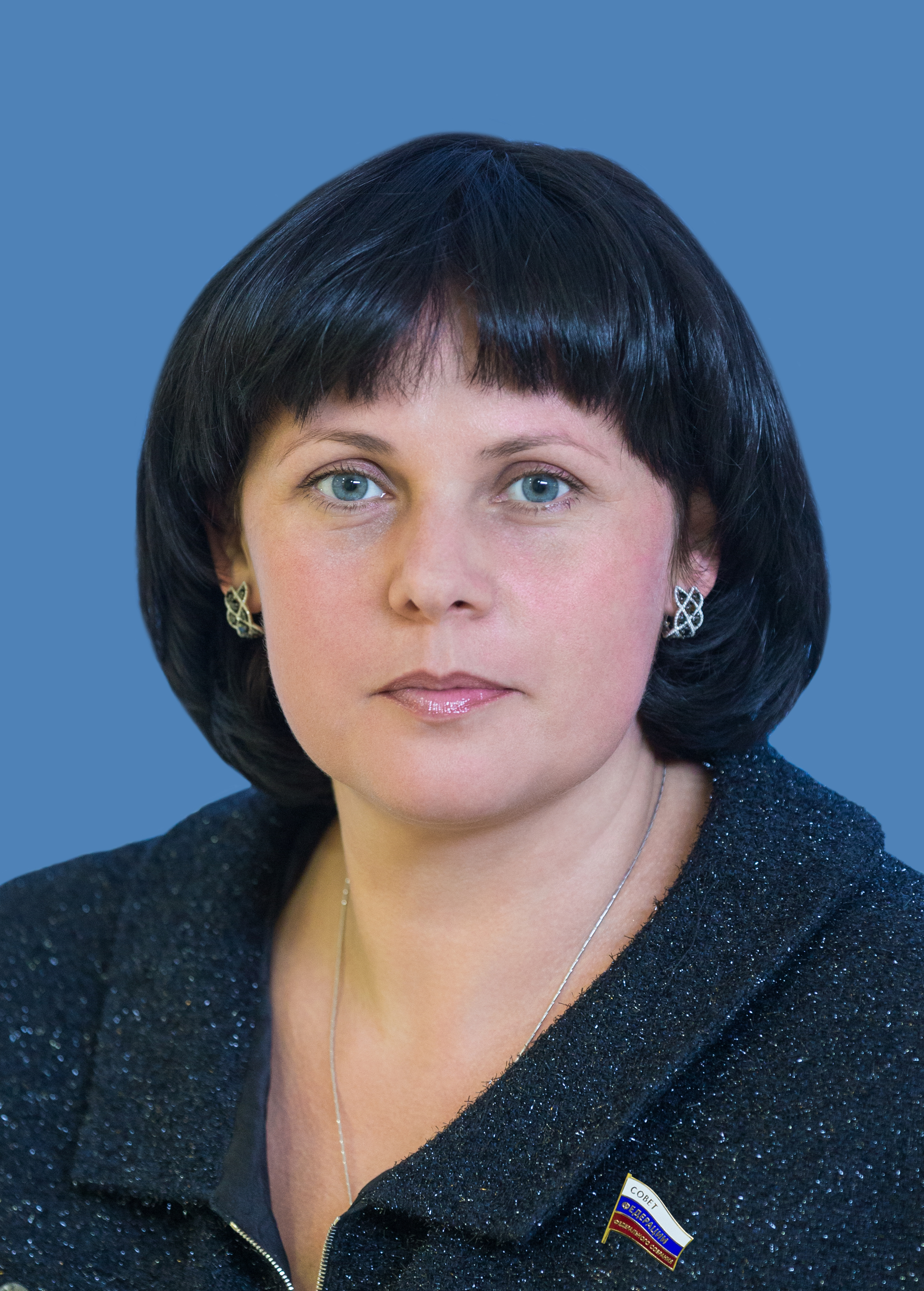
- Elena Afanasyeva in 2017
- Born: March 27, 1975 (age 51)
- Occupation: Politician

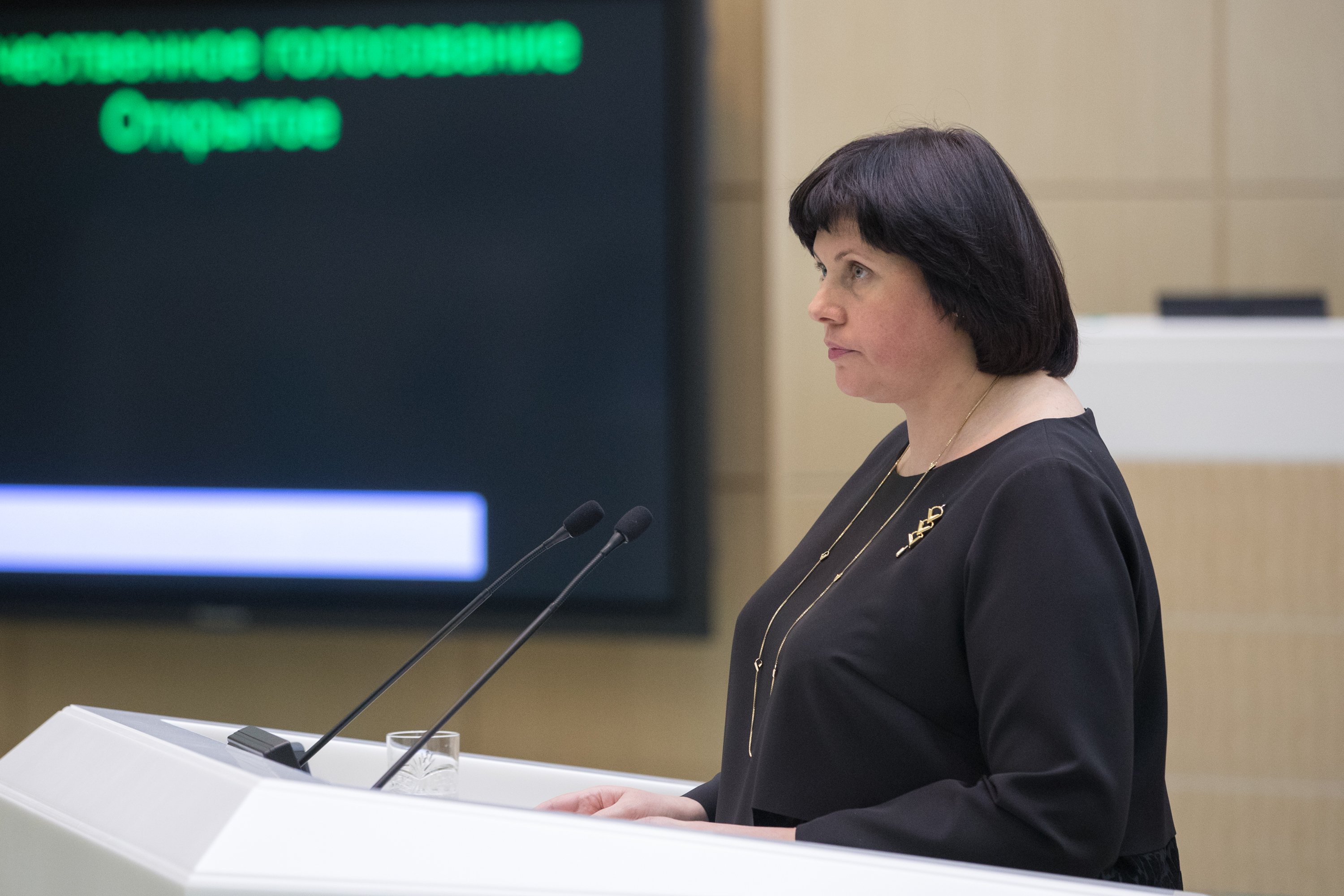

Yelena Vladimirovna Afanasyeva (Russian: Елена Владимировна Афанасьева; born 27 March 1975) is a Russian politician. She was a member of the State Duma between 2003 and 2014. She is a member of the Liberal Democratic Party of Russia group. She attended Orenburg Educational Institute. She was selected to be a senator in the Federation Council from 26 September 2014, representing Orenburg Oblast.

== Biography ==
Afanasyeva was born 27 March 1975 in Orenburg.

In 1997 she graduated from Orenburg State Pedagogical University. In 2007 she graduated from the Diplomatic Academy of the Ministry of Foreign Affairs of the Russian Federation. In 2012 she received a law degree from the Institute of World Civilizations.

She is a candidate of Historical Sciences since 2007.

== Career ==
In 1998 she was elected chairman of the regional branch of the Liberal Democratic Party of Russia.

In 2003 she was appointed assistant to Vladimir Zhirinovsky (deputy of the State Duma of the Russian Federation of the III convocation, leader of the LDPR).

In 2003 she became a deputy of the State Duma of the Russian Federation of the IV convocation from the LDPR in the Orenburg single-mandate electoral district No. 132.

In 2007 she was elected to the State Duma of the Russian Federation of the V convocation on the list of the LDPR.

Since 2014 she is a member of the Federation Council from the Orenburg Oblast.

In 2024 Elena Afanasyeva was appointed Senator of the Russian Federation from the Orenburg Oblast.

== Awards and honours ==
- Gratitude of the Government of the Russian Federation (2017)
- Medal of the Order "For Merit to the Fatherland", 2nd class (2020)

== Sanctions ==
Due to her support for the violation of Ukraine's territorial integrity during the Russo-Ukrainian war, she is subject to personal international sanctions imposed by several countries.

On March 9, 2022, amid Russia's invasion of Ukraine, she was added to the sanctions list of all European Union member states for voting in favor of ratifying the treaties of friendship with the self-proclaimed LPR and DPR.

On March 23, 2022, she was included in Canada's sanctions list of “regime associates” for contributing to the violation of Ukraine's sovereignty and territorial integrity.

On September 30, 2022, she was sanctioned by the United States “for Putin's annexation of Ukrainian regions” and for supporting the law on so-called “fake news.” The U.S. Department of State noted that senators “voted to approve Putin's request to deploy troops to Ukraine, which served as an unfounded pretext for Russia's full-scale invasion of Ukraine”.

On similar grounds, she has been under UK sanctions since March 15, 2022; under Swiss sanctions since March 16, 2022; under Australian sanctions since April 21, 2022; and under Ukrainian sanctions since October 7, 2022, for “supporting Russia's unlawful attempts to annex sovereign Ukrainian territory through sham referenda”.

== Family ==
Divorced. He has a son and a daughter. His family resides in Moscow.
