= Legislative Assembly of Orenburg Oblast =

Regional parliament of Orenburg Oblast, Russia

Legislative Assembly of Orenburg Oblast Законодательное собрание Оренбургской области
- 7th legislature

Type
- Type: Unicameral

Leadership
- Chairman: Sergey Grachyov, United Russia since 24 March 2011

Structure
- Seats: 47
- Political groups: United Russia (29) CPRF (12); SRZP (3); LDPR (2) RPPSJ (1)

Elections
- Voting system: Mixed
- Last election: 19 September 2021
- Next election: 2026

Meeting place
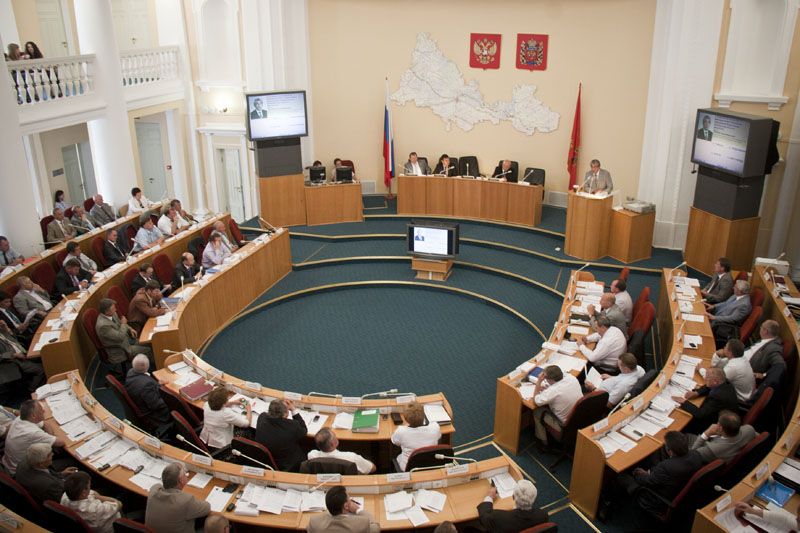
- 9 January Street, Orenburg

Website
- zaksob.ru

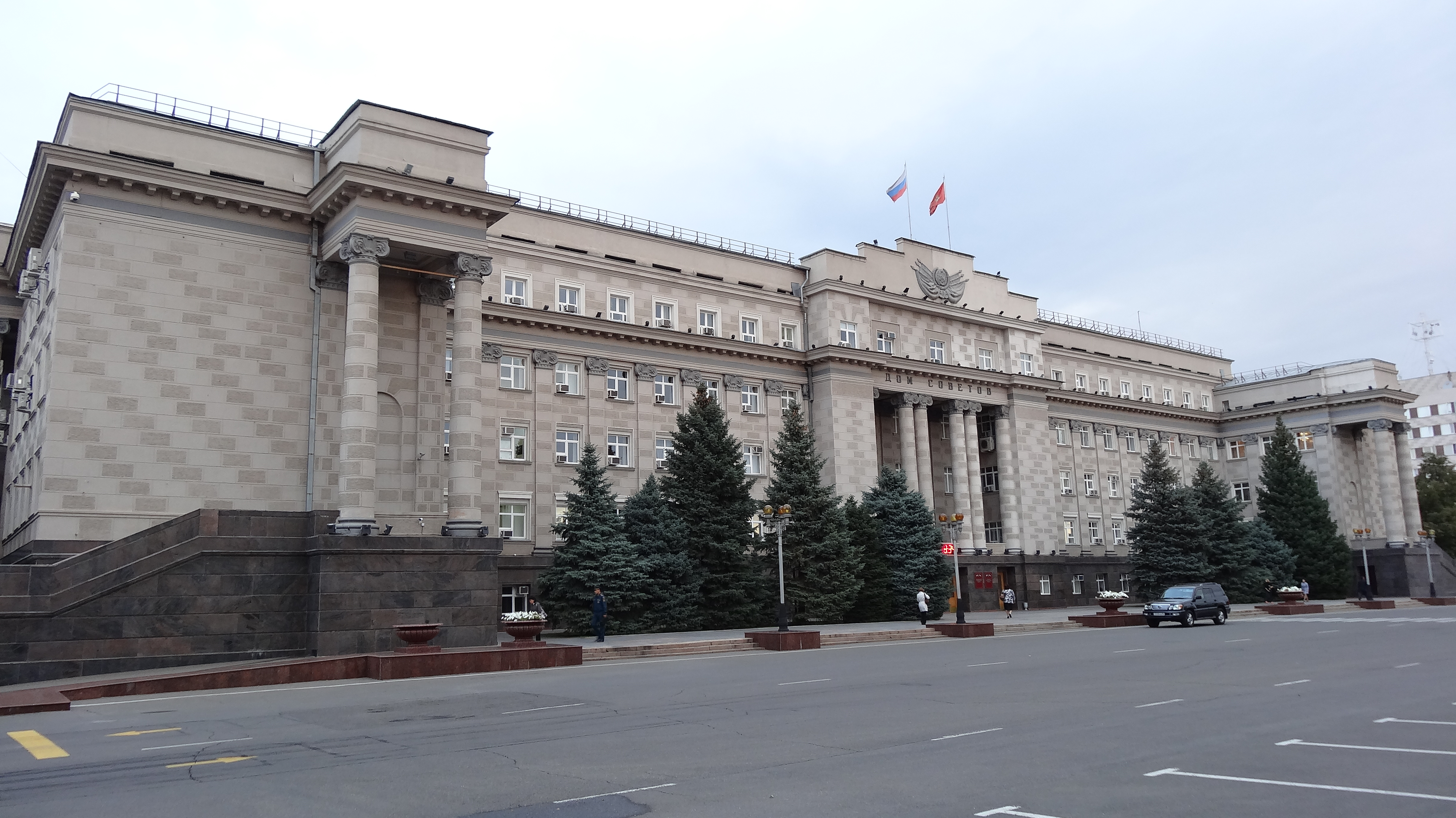
House of Soviets, Orenburg

The Legislative Assembly of Orenburg Oblast (Russian: Законодательное собрание Оренбургской области, romanized: Zakonodatel'noye sobraniye Orenburgskoy oblasti) is the regional parliament of Orenburg Oblast, a federal subject of Russia. A total of 47 deputies are elected for five-year terms.

== Elections ==
=== 2021 ===
Party	%	Seats
United Russia	39.46	29
Communist Party of the Russian Federation	29.11	12
Liberal Democratic Party of Russia	12.45	2
A Just Russia — For Truth	10.07	3
Russian Party of Pensioners for Social Justice	6.86	1
Registered voters/turnout	45.33	
