= Dzhabarov =

Dzhabarov is a surname (Russian: Джабаров). Notable people with the surname include:

- Vladik Dzhabarov, Soviet cyclist
- Vladimir Dzhabarov (born 1952), Uzbek-born Russian statesman, politician, and government agent
