= Church of Christ's Ascension, Golubkovskoe =

Orthodox church in Sverdlovsk Oblast, Russia

Church of Christ's Ascension
- Церковь Вознесения Господня
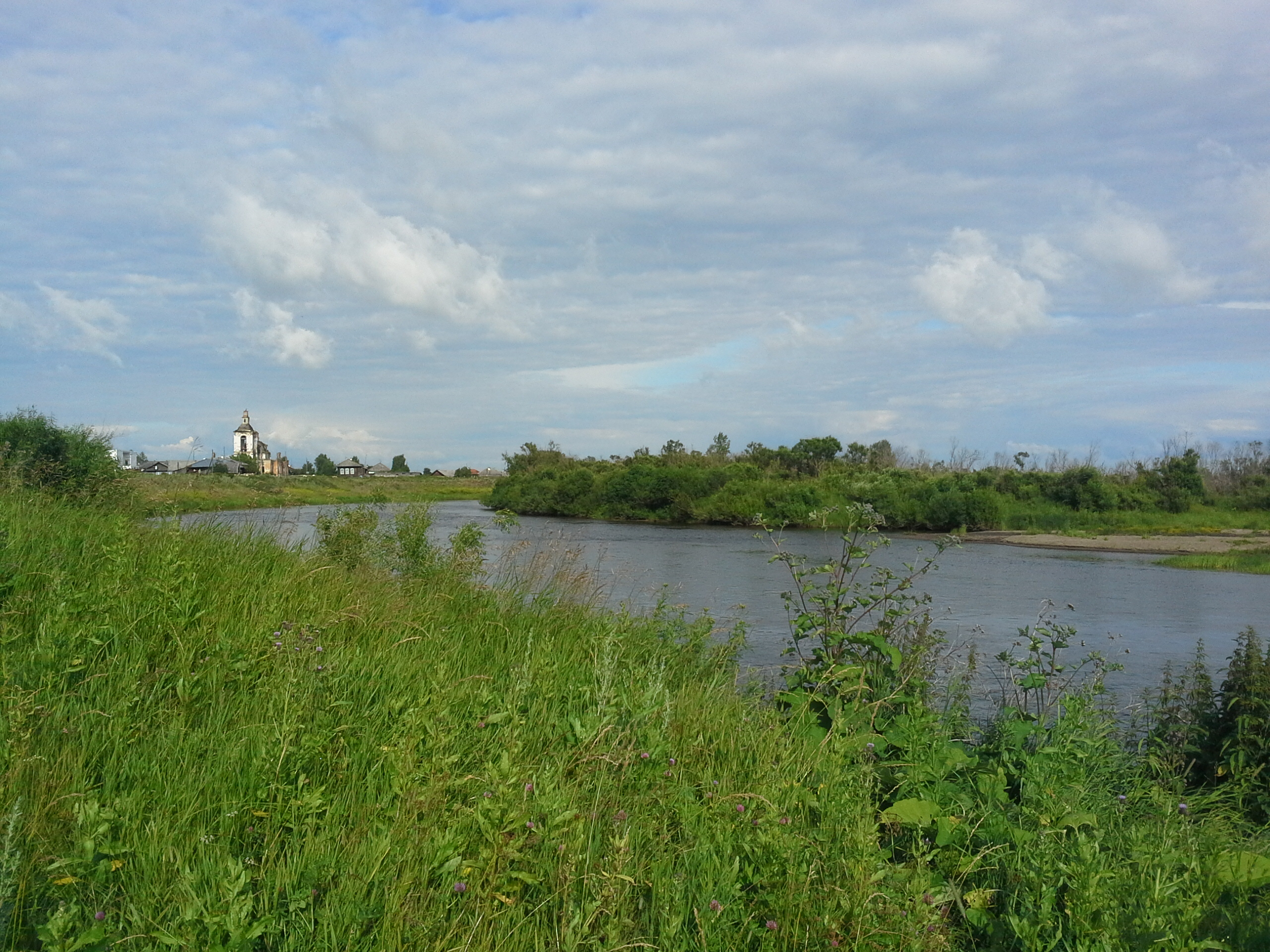
- Interactive map of the Church of Christ's Ascension area

General information
- Location: Golubkovskoe
- Coordinates: 57°56′31″N 62°30′19″E
- Completed: the 19th century

Church of Christ's Ascension is an Orthodox church in Golubkovskoe village, Sverdlovsk oblast.

The building was granted the status of regional significance on 31 December 1987 (decision No. 535 by the executive committee of Sverdlovsk oblast Council of People's Deputies). The object number of cultural heritage of regional significance is 661710828700005.

== History ==
The parish consists of eight villages: Yudina, Bunkova, Borovaya, Tomshina, Rudnaya, Udintseva, Sokolova, Mokina. The number of parishioners was little more than 4000.

According to the archives, the first building was wooden and located in another part of the village. The church was very small. In 1806 construction of a large stone single-storey building was started in the central part of the village. A side-chapel in the name of the Archangel Michael was added to the northern facade in 1821. A limit in the name of the prophet Elijah was built on the south side in 1872. The temple building, part of the archive and the library were suffered during a violent rural fire in 1892. The reconstruction works were carried out during 5 years. The parish included several houses in Golubovskoe village.

== Architecture ==
The building was made of stone with the temple quadrangular and refectory in the western part. The bell tower is slightly shifted from the common axis. Its attachments are not the same in area but form a single volume.

The temple quadrangular is on the level of the refectory. The altar is dissected by a wide girdle-cornice separating the likeness of the attic. It is crowned with a four-edged dome with lucarnes and a cupola. The apse is ornamented with pilasters. The window openings, except for the round ones, have the same form throughout the entire structure: a flat frame with an entablature and a triangular pediment. However, in the temple it is stepped, and at the refectory - elongated. The massive belfry has four-sloped roof.

== Literature ==
- Свод памятников истории и культуры Свердловской области. Vol. 2. Екатеринбург: Сократ. 2008. p. 648. ISBN 978-5-88664-323-7 – via ред. В.Е.Звагельская.
- Бурлакова Н.Н. (2011). Забытые храмы Свердловской области. Екатеринбург: Сократ. pp. 128–129. ISBN 978-5-88664-395-4.
- Приходы и церкви Екатеринбургской епархии. Екатеринбург: Братство Св. Праведного Симеона Верхотурского Чудотворца. 1902. p. 647.
