= The Church of the Vernicle Image of the Saviour, Krasnogorskoye =

The Church of the Vernicle Image of the Saviour
- Церковь Спаса Нерукотворного Образа
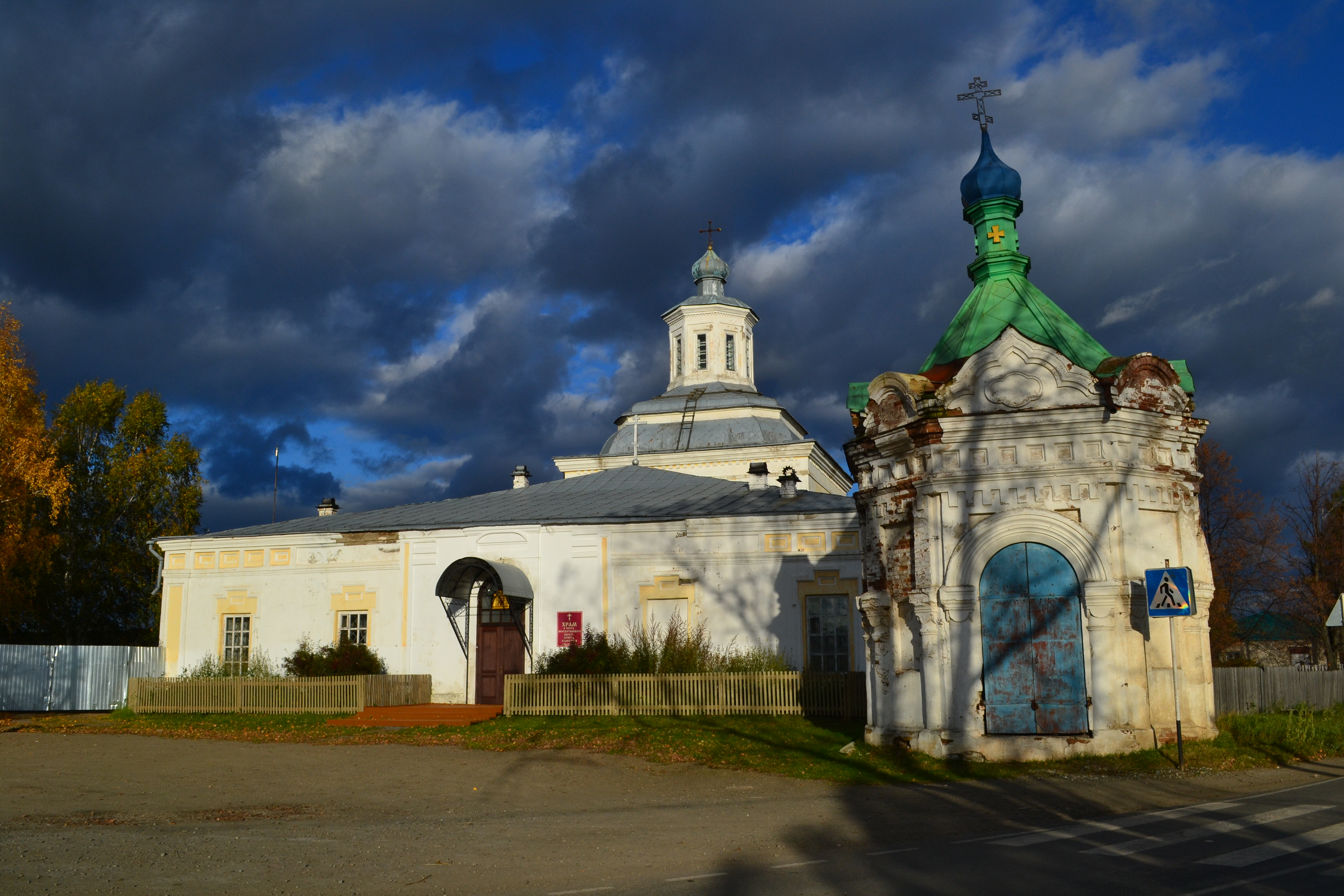

General information
- Location: Krasnogorskoye, 5 Malyshev Street
- Coordinates: 58°48′12″N 61°09′50″E
- Construction started: 1802
- Completed: 1810

The Church of the Vernicle Image of the Saviour (Russian: Церковь Спаса Нерукотворного Образа) is an Orthodox church in Krasnogorskoye village, Sverdlovsk oblast. 'Vernicle' refers to Saint Veronica.

The building was granted the status of regional significance on 31 December 1987 (decision No. 535 by the executive committee of Sverdlovsk oblast Council of People's Deputies). The object number of cultural heritage of regional significance is 661410163420005.

== History ==
The construction of the building began on 31 May 1802 on the right bank of the river Tura in the northern part of the village. The right side-chapel was consecrated in the name of The Great Martyr Saint Catherine on 8 February 1804. The main church was consecrated in honor of the Vernicle Image of the Saviour on 4 July 1810. The attached left side-chapel was consecrated in the name of Saint Nicholas on 28 October 1875. In 1903 the Spassky stone chapel was built on the 100th anniversary of the church.

Since 1932 the church building has been closed. Afterwards, it functioned variously as a warehouse, shop, and gymnasium. In 1992 the church was returned to the Russian Orthodox Church. Since 1991 the church has been in the process of restoration.

The Church was built from 1802 to 1810 with architectural elements of classicism and "Siberian Baroque".

== Architecture ==
The church has a cube form with a five-edged apse. On both sides of the church building two chapels are attached with their own altars. At the base of the bell tower were two porches. The temple is crowned with a flat two-tiered dome bearing a small eights with a head. A similar octal is completed and the apse. The facade decoration was changed at the recent restoration. Now it comes down to flat window frames, complemented by the inexpressive outlines of arched dripstones. The chapels have ledged window surrounds.

The chapel has Russian-Byzantine art features. The various decor of the walls includes columns, rectangular flat niches, and dentals.

== Literature ==
- Свод памятников истории и культуры Свердловской области. Vol. 2. Екатеринбург: Сократ. 2008. p. 648. ISBN 978-5-88664-323-7 – via ред. В.Е.Звагельская.
- Бурлакова Н.Н. (2011). Забытые храмы Свердловской области. Екатеринбург: Сократ. pp. 128–129. ISBN 978-5-88664-395-4.
- Приходы и церкви Екатеринбургской епархии. Екатеринбург: Братство Св. Праведного Симеона Верхотурского Чудотворца. 1902. p. 647.
