= Church of the Purification of the Blessed Virgin Mary, Staropyshminsk =

Russian Orthodox church in Sverdlovsk Oblast, Russia

Church of the Purification of the Blessed Virgin Mary
- Церковь Сретения Господня
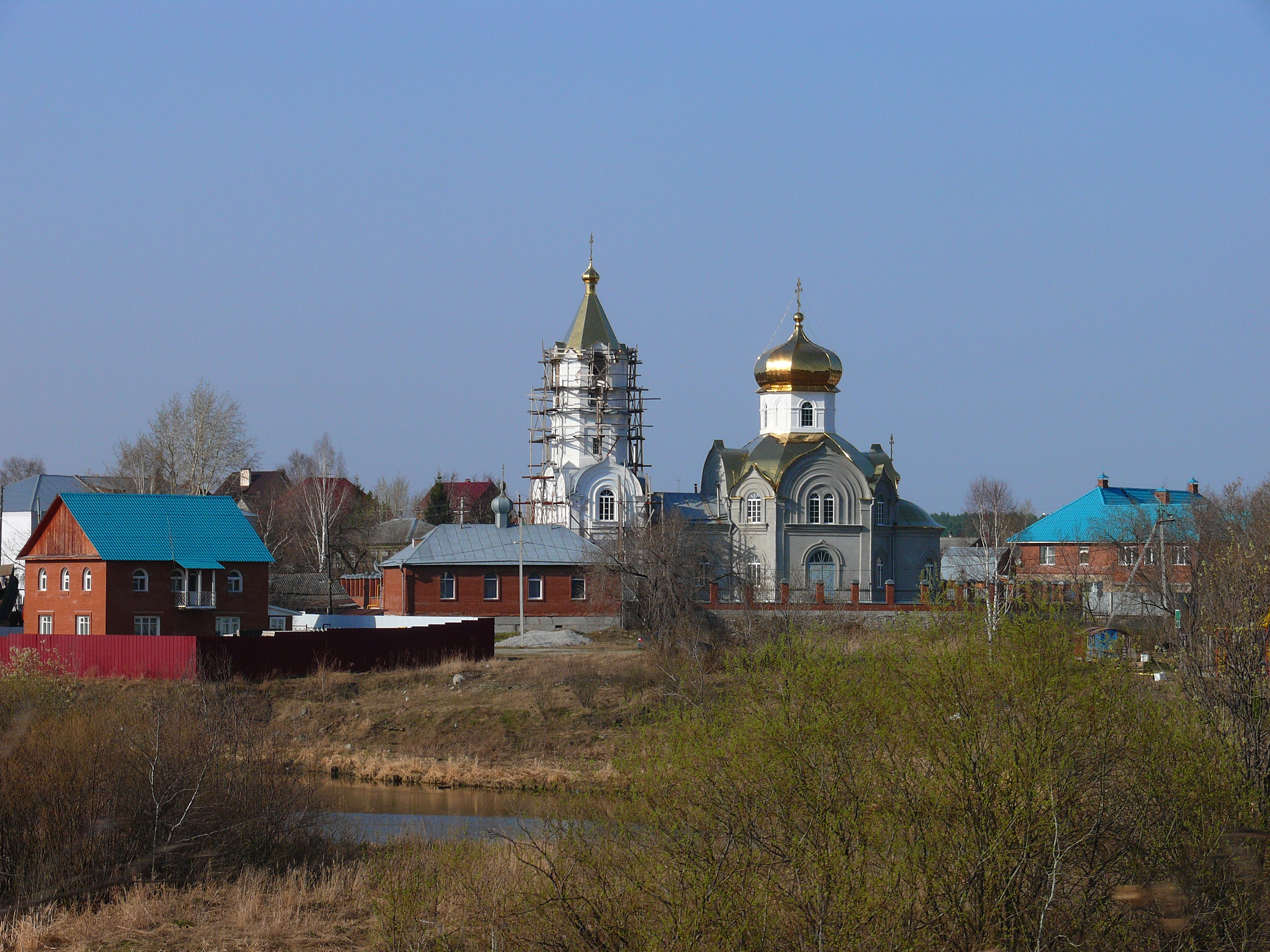
- Interactive map of the Church of the Purification of the Blessed Virgin Mary area

General information
- Location: Staropyshminsk
- Coordinates: 56°55′54″N 60°54′04″E

Church of the Purification of the Blessed Virgin Mary - is an Orthodox church in Staropyshminsk village, Sverdlovsk oblast.

The building was granted the status of regional significance on 10 March 2011 (the Sverdlovsk oblast Government Decree No. 207). The object number of cultural heritage of regional significance is 661710842510005.

== History ==
The Pyshminsky plant related to the Cathedral of The Great Martyr Saint Catherine parish in Yekaterinburg until 1765. After the arrival of the Beryozovsky plant the independent parish was founded in 1809. The same year the church building was laid. The first church building and the bell tower were wooden. The funds for construction were allocated from the donations of the Perm diocese. Also the manager Ivan Gavrilovich Shevkunov donated money to church building. On 9 February 1810 the building was consecrated in honor of the Purification of the Blessed Virgin Mary by Father John Popov.

By 1844 the parish included Stanovaya and Sarapulka villages.

In 1882 the construction of a new stone building began. On 5 July 1887 the temple was consecrated by the Ekaterinburg bishop Nathaniel in honor of the Purification of the Blessed Virgin Mary. The wooden church was not dismantled, it remained ascribed. By 1904 the church parish had almost 2300 parishioners. The clergy of parish consisted of a priest and a psalm-reader.

In 1938 the building of a wooden church burned down. The stone building continued working until 1941. On 7 March 1941 the church was closed (the decision of Sverdlovsk Regional Executive Committee No. 633). Later there was a Youth club.

== Architecture ==
It is located in the central part of the village. The church has Russian-Byzantine art features. It is distinguished by the monumental composition.

The building is made of stone. The main part of the building is octagonal with a semicircular altar. From the western part there are a refectory and a wide porch. In the center the bell tower stands.

The walls of the church are decorated on the joints with pilasters between which is a complex multi-brass cornice. The keeled arches are also attached to the portals and framing of the lower windows. The upper windows on the northern and southern sides are doubled, inscribed in semicircular arches.

The church is crowned with a large bulbous head on a drum-eight. Elements of decoration of the refectory and porch are similar to the church ones.

== Literature ==
- Свод памятников истории и культуры Свердловской области. Vol. 2. Екатеринбург: Сократ. 2008. p. 648. ISBN 978-5-88664-323-7 – via ред. В.Е.Звагельская.
- Бурлакова Н.Н. (2011). Забытые храмы Свердловской области. Екатеринбург: Сократ. pp. 128–129. ISBN 978-5-88664-395-4.
- Приходы и церкви Екатеринбургской епархии. Екатеринбург: Братство Св. Праведного Симеона Верхотурского Чудотворца. 1902. p. 647.
