= Sverdlovsk Oblast =

First-level administrative division of Russia

Sverdlovsk Oblast Свердловская область (Russian)
- Oblast
- Flag Coat of arms

- Coordinates: 58°42′N 61°20′E
- Country: Russia
- Federal district: Ural
- Economic region: Ural
- Established: 17 January 1934
- Administrative center: Yekaterinburg

Government
  - Body: Legislative Assembly
  - Governor: Denis Pasler

Area
  - Total: 194,226 km^{2} (74,991 sq mi)
  - Rank: 17th

Population (2021 census)
  - Total: 4,268,998 ▼
  - Estimate (2018): 4,325,256
  - Rank: 5th
  - Density: 21.9795/km^{2} (56.9267/sq mi)
  - Urban: 85.8%
  - Rural: 14.2%

GDP (nominal, 2024)
  - Total: ₽4.13 trillion (US$48.44 billion)
  - Per capita: ₽975,701 (US$11,449.07)
- Time zone: UTC+5 (MSK+2)
- ISO 3166 code: RU-SVE
- License plates: 66, 96, 196
- OKTMO ID: 65000000
- Official languages: Russian
- Website: midural.ru

Sverdlovsk Oblast (Note: Russian: Свердловская область, romanized: Sverdlovskaya oblast, [ʹsvʲɪrdˈlofskəjə ˈobləsʲtʲ]) is a federal subject (an oblast) of Russia located in the Ural Federal District. Its administrative center is the city of Yekaterinburg, formerly known as Sverdlovsk. Its population is 4,268,998 (according to the 2021 Census).

== Geography ==
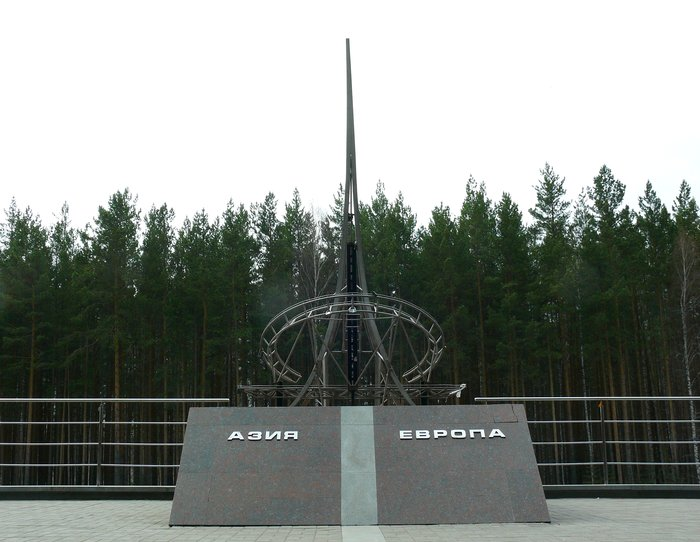
Landmark indicating the border between Europe and Asia in Sverdlovsk Oblast.

Most of the oblast is spread over the eastern slopes of the Middle and North Urals and the Western Siberian Plain. Only in the southwest does the oblast stretch onto the western slopes of the Ural Mountains.

The highest mountains all rise in the North Urals, Konzhakovsky Kamen at 1,569 metres (5,148 ft) and Denezhkin Kamen at 1,492 metres (4,895 ft). The Middle Urals is mostly hilly country with no discernible peaks; the mean elevation is closer to 300 to 500 metres (980 to 1,640 ft) above sea level. Principal rivers include the Tavda, the Tura, the Chusovaya, and the Ufa, the latter two being tributaries of the Kama.

Sverdlovsk Oblast borders with, clockwise from the west, Perm Krai, the Komi Republic, Khanty–Mansi Autonomous Okrug, Tyumen Oblast, Kurgan Oblast, Chelyabinsk Oblast, and the Republic of Bashkortostan.

The area is traversed by the northeasterly line of equal latitude and longitude.

=== Natural resources ===
Rich in natural resources, the oblast is especially famous for metals (iron, copper, gold, platinum), minerals (asbestos, gemstones, talcum), marble and coal. It is mostly here that the bulk of Russian industry was concentrated in the 18th and 19th centuries.

=== Climate ===
The area has continental climate patterns, with long cold winters (average temperatures reaching −15 °C (5 °F) to −25 °C (−13 °F) on the Western Siberian Plain) and short warm summers. Only in the southeast of the oblast do temperatures reach +30 °C (86 °F) in July.

== History ==
=== Early history ===
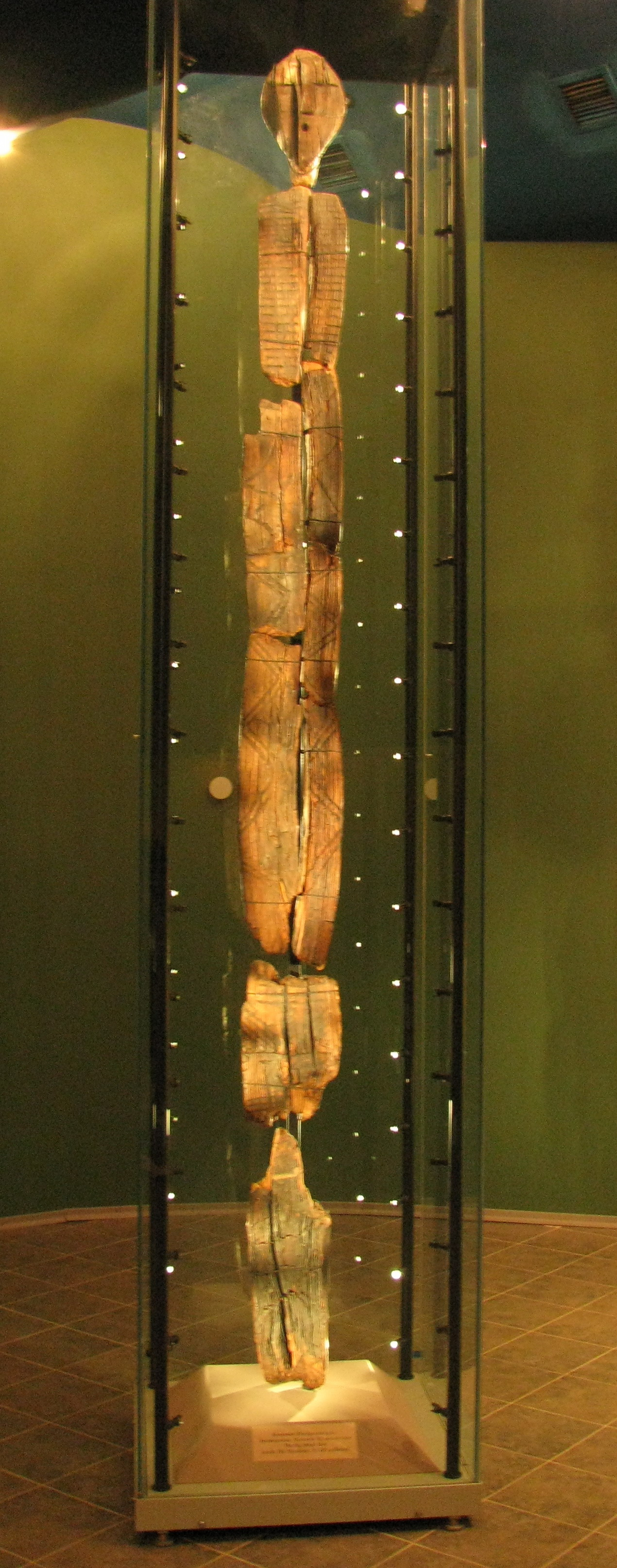
Wooden sculpture dated to 11,500 years ago may have stood more than 5 m high

The territory of the region has been inhabited since ancient times. Numerous sites of ancient people were discovered, dating from the Paleolithic to the Iron Age. The Upper Paleolithic includes the Garinsky site on the right bank of the Sosva river near the village of Gari, the site in the Shaitansky grotto, and the site in the Bezymyanny cave (X millennium BC). In 1890, the 11 thousand years old (Mesolithic) Shigir idol was discovered.

A settlement and a burial ground in the Kalmatsky Brod tract are located on the right bank of the Iset river and date back to the Sarmatian time (from the 3rd century BC to the 2nd century AD). They belong to the Kalmak archaeological culture. In the Kalmatsky Brod burial ground, the skeletal skulls were strongly deformed by tight bandaging in early childhood, which indicates the penetration of steppe ethnic elements to the north.

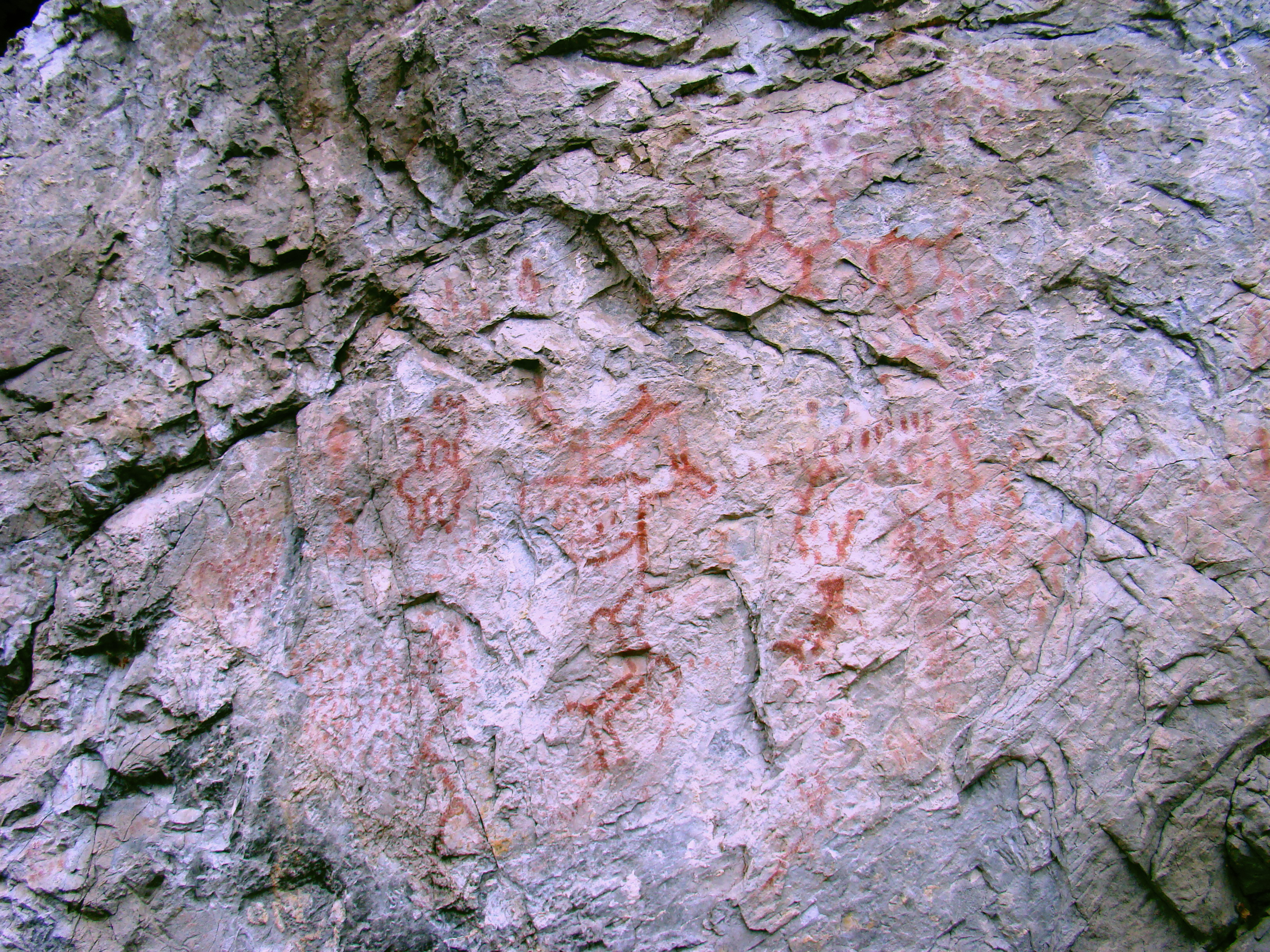
Pictograms on the Neyva River

There are numerous pictograms on the Koptelovsky stone, on the Oblique stone, on the Two-eyed stone, Starichnaya, Serginskaya, the rock paintings of the Bronze Age on the Neyva River, Tagil River (villages Brekhovaya, Gaevaya, Komelskaya), rock carvings on Shaitan-Kamen on the right bank of the Rezh river tied to indigenous Ural population, possibly speakers of a Ugric language. The Gostkovskaya Pisanitsa refers to the Middle Ages.

=== Medieval history and Russian expansion ===
Before the first Russian colonists arrived to the region, it was populated by various Turkic and Ugrian tribes. By the 16th century, when the Middle Urals were under influence of various Tatar khanates, the strongest local state was the Vogul Pelym principality with its center in Pelym.

The Russian conquest of the Khanate of Kazan in the 1550s paved the way further east, which was now free from Tatar depredations (see Yermak Timofeyevich). The first surviving Russian settlements in the area date back to the late 16th – early 17th centuries (Verkhoturye, 1598; Turinsk, 1600; Irbit, 1633; Alapayevsk, 1639). At that time, those small trading posts were governed under Siberian administration in Tobolsk. After the 1708 administrative reform, Verkhoturye, Pelym and Turinsk became a part of the new Siberian Governorate, in 1737 their territories were assigned to the Kazan Governorate.

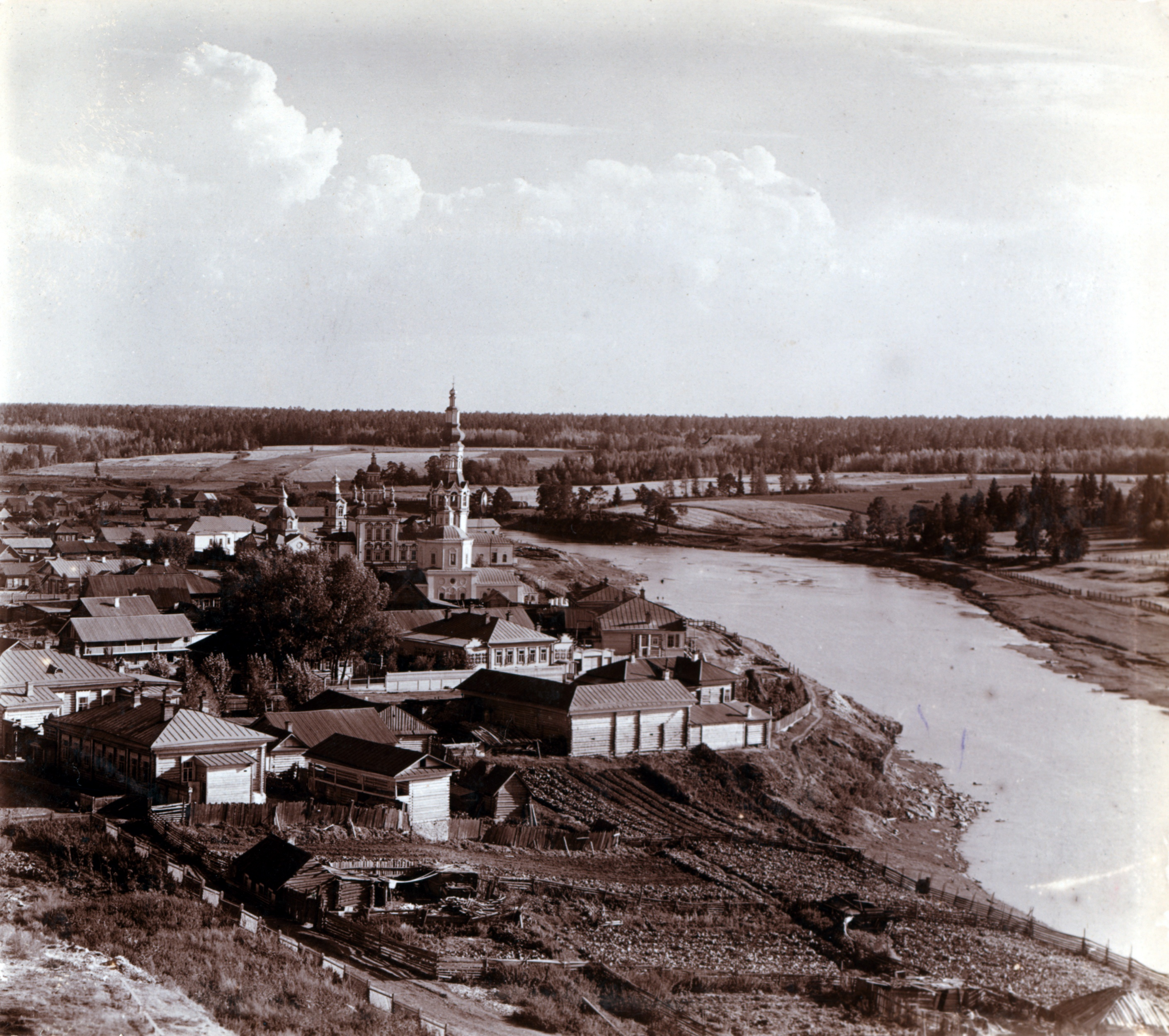
Verkhoturye in 1910

=== Rise of the mining-metallurgical era ===
During the 18th century, rich resources of iron and coal made Ural an industrial heartland of Russia. After getting control over Ural mines, the Demidov family put the region in the forefront of Russian industrialization. Yekaterinburg, Nevyansk and Tagil ironworks, founded in the 1700s to 1720s, soon joined the ranks of the major producers in Europe. Throughout the 18th and 19th century those newly founded factory towns enjoyed a status of special mining-metallurgical districts allowed to have a certain rate of financial and proprietary autonomy. During the 1781 reform middle Ural finally got its own regional administration in the form of the Perm Governorate.

When in 1812 the Russian government legalized gold digging for its citizens, Middle Ural became a center of gold mining. Entrepreneurs of the Perm Governorate also started the gold rush in West Siberia, soon Yekaterinburgers began to dominate the Russian market of precious metals and gemstones.

After the emancipation reform of 1861, major Middle Uralian industries that were heavily dependent on serf labor entered decline, although it also allowed light industry to thrive. In 1878, Perm and Yekaterinburg were connected with a railroad, in 1888, railroads reached Tyumen, and ultimately, in 1897, Yekaterinburg joined the Trans-Siberian network. Emergence of railroad transportation helped to revitalize economy of Ural.

=== Soviet Ural ===
The Bolsheviks established their power in Yekaterinburg and Perm during the first days of the October Revolution of 1917. In early 1918 the dethroned Czar Nicholas II and his family were transferred under custody to Yekaterinburg. Local Bolsheviks decided autonomously to execute the royal family on 17 July 1918, to prevent its rescue by the approaching White Army forces. Ten days later Yekaterinburg was captured by the Czechoslovak troops of Sergei Wojciechowski. For the next year the anti-Bolshevik forces took control over the region. On 19 August 1918, Provisional Government of Ural was formed in Yekaterinburg by a coalition of liberal and democratic socialist parties, it was supposed to serve as a buffer between the Komuch and Provisional Siberian governments. After the Kolchak coup d'état in Omsk in November 1918, the Government of Ural was disbanded.

In July 1919, in the course of the Yekaterinburg offensive, Yekaterinburg and the surrounding areas were recaptured by the Red Army forces under command of Vasily Shorin. On 15 July the Perm Governorate was split by the Soviets and the east, for the first time in history, became a separate region, the Yekaterinburg Governorate. It was soon abolished and replaced by the Ural Oblast (1923–1934).

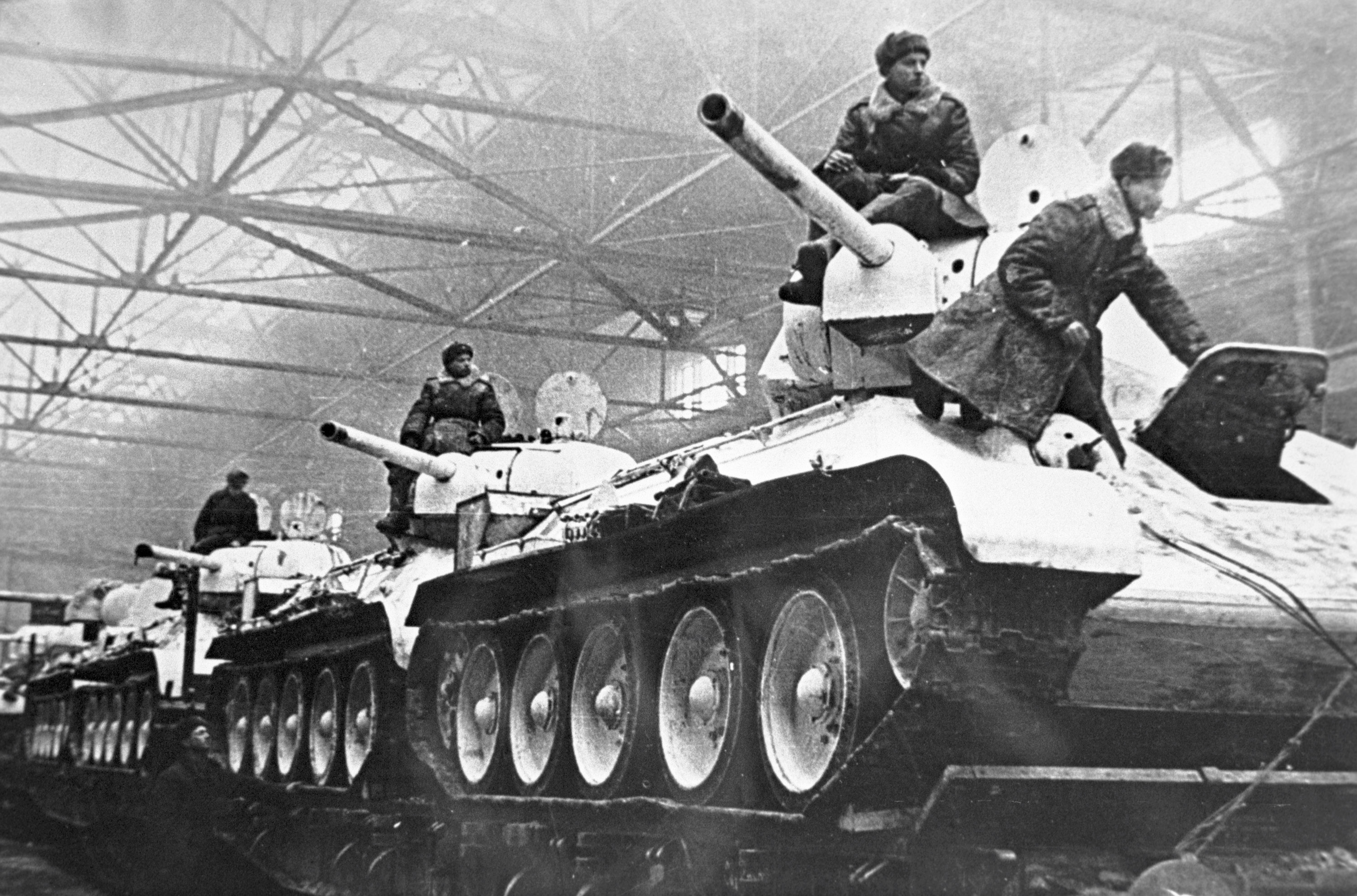
T-34 tanks on the conveyor belt of the Uralmash plant (1942)

In the 1930s many industrial enterprises were established and built with the help of forced labour. Local industry received another impetus during World War II, when important producing facilities were relocated here from the European part of Russia to safeguard them from the advancing Germans (for example, IMZ-Ural, Kamensk-Uralsky Metallurgical Works). In the postwar period much of the region was off-limits to foreigners. It was over Sverdlovsk that the American U-2 spy plane pilot Gary Powers was shot down on 1 May 1960, while on a reconnaissance mission.

In 1979, there was an anthrax outbreak caused by an accident in a facility to develop biological weapons.

=== Post-Soviet transition ===
In 1993, Governor Eduard Rossel responded to perceived economic inequality by attempting to create a "Ural Republic." Sverdlovsk led the "Urals Five" (Kurgan Oblast, Orenburg Oblast, Perm Krai, Chelyabinsk Oblast and Sverdlovsk) in a call for greater regional power. They argued that the oblasts deserved as much power as the ethnic homeland republics. The Urals Republic Constitution went into effect on 27 October 1993. Then Russian president Boris Yeltsin dissolved the Urals Republic and the Sverdlovsk Parliament 10 days later (on 9 November).

== Administrative divisions ==
Sverdlovsk Oblast, Russia
Administrative center: Yekaterinburg
As of 2013:
Number of districts (районы)	30
Number of cities/towns (города)	47
Number of urban-type settlements (посёлки городского типа)	27
Number of selsovets (сельсоветы)	431
As of 2002:
Number of rural localities (сельские населённые пункты)	1,796
Number of uninhabited rural localities (сельские населённые пункты без населения)	128

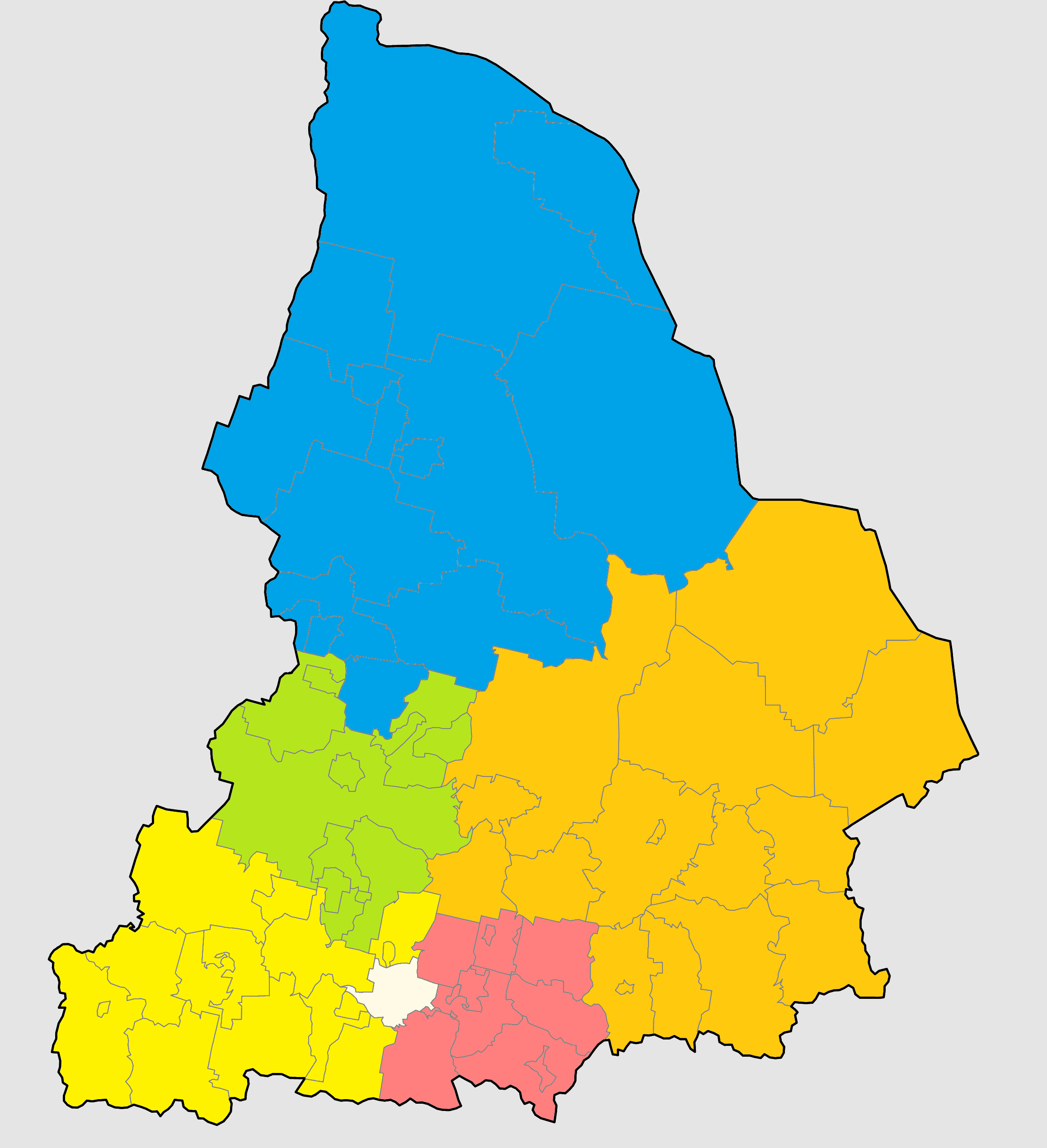
Map of the Administrative Divisions of Sverdlovsk Oblast (Divide 4 regions)

== Demographics ==
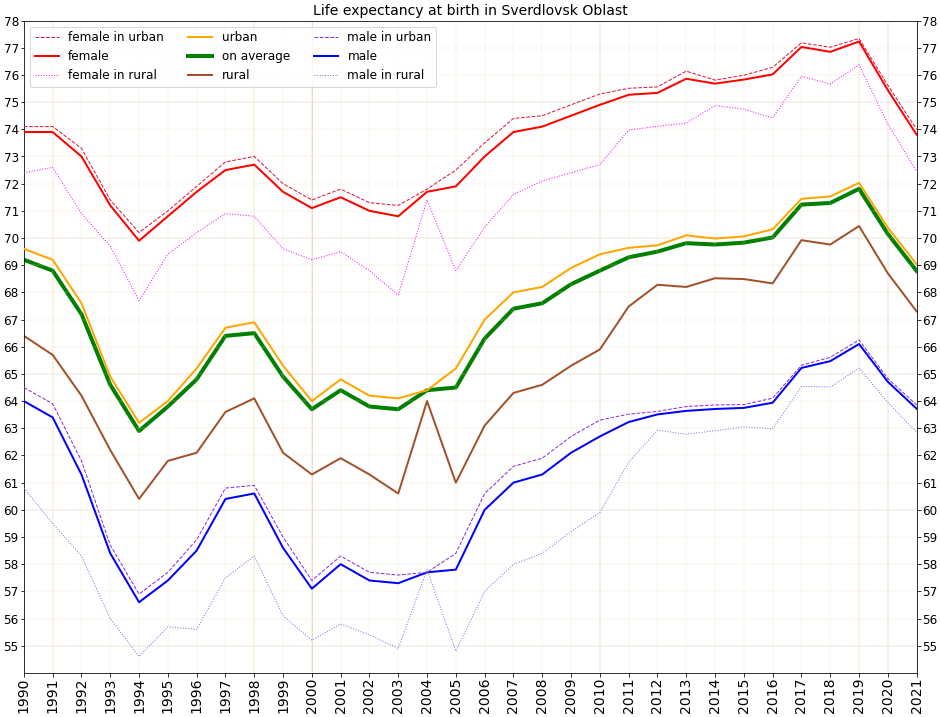
Life expectancy at birth in Sverdlovsk Oblast

Population: 4,268,998 (2021 census); 4,297,747 (2010 census); 4,486,214 (2002 census); 4,716,768 (1989 Soviet census).

Vital statistics for 2024:

- Births: 36,948 (8.8 per 1,000)
- Deaths: 57,874 (13.7 per 1,000)

Total fertility rate (2024):
1.52 children per woman

Life expectancy (2021):
Total — 68.79 years (male — 63.72, female — 73.80)

=== Settlements ===
Largest cities or towns in Sverdlovsk Oblast 2020
Rank		Administrative Division	Pop.
1	Yekaterinburg	City of Yekaterinburg	1,493,749
2	Nizhny Tagil	City of Nizhny Tagil	349,008
3	Kamensk-Uralsky	City of Kamensk-Uralsky	166,086
4	Pervouralsk	City of Pervouralsk	120,778
5	Serov	Town of Serov	95,861
6	Novouralsk	Closed administrative-territorial formation of Novouralsk	80,357
7	Verkhnyaya Pyshma	Town of Verkhnyaya Pyshma	72,688
8	Asbest	Town of Asbest	62,908
9	Revda	Town of Revda	61,533
10	Polevskoy	Town of Polevskoy	60,979

Historical population
Year	Pop.	±%
1926	3,151,883	—
1939	2,331,176	−26.0%
1959	4,044,416	+73.5%
1970	4,319,741	+6.8%
1979	4,453,491	+3.1%
1989	4,716,768	+5.9%
2002	4,486,214	−4.9%
2010	4,297,747	−4.2%
2021	4,268,998	−0.7%
Source: Census data

=== Ethnic groups ===
There were twenty-one recognized ethnic groups of more than two thousand persons each in the oblast. Residents identified themselves as belonging to a total of 148 different ethnic groups, including:

- 3,684,843 Russians (90.6%);
- 143,803 Tatars (3.5%);
- 35,563 Ukrainians (0.9%);
- 31,183 Bashkirs (0.8%);
- 23,801 Mari (0.6%);
- 14,914 Germans (0.4%);
- 14,215 Azerbaijanis (0.3%);
- 13,789 Udmurts (0.3%);
- 11,670 Belarusians (0.3%);
- 11,510 Chuvash (0.26%);
- 11,501 Armenians (0.3%);
- 11,138 Tajiks (0.3%);
- 9,702 Mordovians (0.22%);
- 9,358 Uzbeks (0.2%);

232,978 people were registered from administrative databases, and could not declare an ethnicity. It is estimated that the proportion of ethnicities in this group is the same as that of the declared group.

=== Religion ===
Religion in Sverdlovsk Oblast as of 2012 (Sreda Arena Atlas)
Russian Orthodoxy	33%
Other Orthodox	2.1%
Other Christians	5.8%
Islam	2.9%
Rodnovery and other native faiths	1.3%
Spiritual but not religious	36.1%
Atheism and irreligion	13%
Other and undeclared	5.8%

Christianity is the largest religion in Sverdlovsk Oblast. According to a 2012 survey 43% of the population of Sverdlovsk Oblast adheres to the Russian Orthodox Church, 5% are nondenominational Christians (excluding Protestant churches), 3% are Muslims, 2% are Orthodox Christian believers without belonging to any Church or are members of other Orthodox churches, 1% are adherents of the Slavic native faith (Rodnovery), and 0.3% are adherents of forms of Hinduism (Vedism, Krishnaism or Tantrism). In addition, 36% of the population declares to be "spiritual but not religious", and 9.7% is atheist.

=== Education ===
The most important institutions of higher education include Ural Federal University, Ural State Medical University, Ural State University of Economics, Ural State Law University, Ural State Mining University and Ural State Academy of Architecture and Arts, all located in the capital Yekaterinburg.

== Politics ==
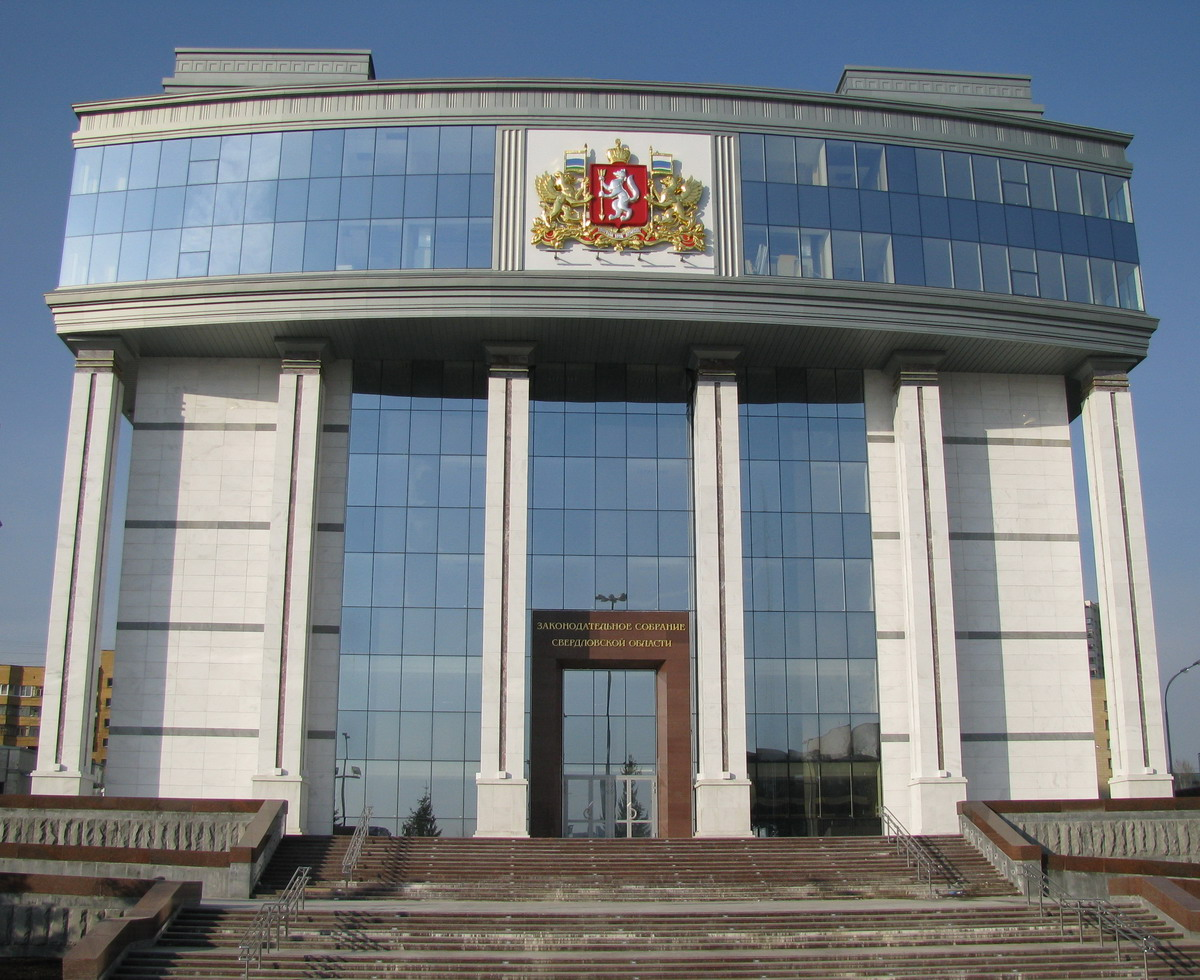
Legislative Assembly of Sverdlovsk Oblast

The oblast's Charter, adopted on 17 December 1994, with subsequent amendments, establishes the oblast government. The governor is the chief executive, who appoints the government, consisting of ministries and departments. The chairman of the government, commonly referred to as the prime minister, is appointed with the consent of the lower house of the legislature, a process similar to the appointment of the federal Prime Minister. But the Governor cannot nominate the same candidate more than twice, yet he/she can dismiss the house after three failed attempts to appoint the Premier.

The Legislative Assembly is the regional parliament of Sverdlovsk Oblast. Until 2011, it was a bicameral legislature consisting of the Oblast Duma, the lower house, and the House of Representatives, the upper house. Before the reform, members of the legislature served four-year terms with half of the Duma re-elected every two years. The Duma (28 members) was elected in party lists. The 21 members of the House of Representatives were elected in single-seat districts in a first-past-the-post system. The Legislative Assembly was the first bicameral legislature outside an autonomous republic, and the first regional legislature in Russia to elect members based on both party lists and single-seat districts. As of 2021, the Legislative Assembly is a unicameral legislature with a total of 50 seats, with half of the members elected by single-mandate constituencies and the other half elected in party lists for five-year terms.

Compliance with the Charter is enforced by the Charter Court. The existence of such regional courts in Russia, formed and functioning outside the federal judiciary, although challenged, has been upheld and persisted successfully in most constituent members of the Federation where they were established.

Until President Putin's reforms of 2004, the governor was elected by direct vote for terms of four years. Eduard Rossel has been the only elected governor (first elected governor for an oblast in Russia) since 1995 (appointed in 1991 and dismissed in 1993 by President Yeltsin), re-elected in 1999 and 2003.

Since March 2025, the oblast's acting governor is Denis Pasler.

=== Chairmen of the Oblast Duma ===
Name	Period
Vyacheslav Surganov	20 April 1996 – April 2000
Yevgeny Porunov	26 April 2000 – April 2002
Nikolay Voronin	24 April 2002 – 23 April 2003
Alexander Zaborov (acting)	23 April 2003 – 3 July 2003
Nikolay Voronin	3 July 2003 – 23 March 2010
Elena Chechunova	23 March 2010 – December 2011

=== Chairmen of the House of Representatives of the Legislative Assembly ===
Name	Period
Aleksandr Shaposhnikov	20 April 1996 – May 1998
Pyotr Golenishchev	14 May 1998 – April 2000
Viktor Yakimov	21 April 2000 – April 2004
Yury Osintsev	6 April 2004 – September 2007
Lyudmila Babushkina	October 2007 – December 2011

=== Elections ===
In the 1990s, the Oblast's population was distinguished by relatively high support for parties and candidates of the right and democratic persuasion. In the 1996 presidential election, Boris Yeltsin, a native of the region who lived in Sverdlovsk until the 1980s, won over 70% of the vote. In the regional elections in 2010 in the Sverdlovsk Oblast, United Russia received minimal support relative to other regions - only 39.79% of votes.

== Economy and transportation ==
Even though it could do with modernizing, the region's industries are quite diverse. 12% of Russia's iron and steel industry is still concentrated in Sverdlovsk oblast. Iron and copper are mined and processed here, the logging industry and wood-processing are important, too.

The largest companies in the region include Ural Mining and Metallurgical Company, UralVagonZavod, Enel Russia, Nizhniy Tagil Iron and Steel Works, Federal Freight.

=== Transport ===
Yekaterinburg is a prominent road, rail and air hub in the Ural region. As the economic slump subsided, several European airlines started or resumed flights to the city. These include Lufthansa, British Airways, CSA, Turkish Airlines, Austrian Airlines and Finnair. Malév Hungarian Airlines used to be among those carriers but they had to drop their flights to SVX (IATA airport code for Sverdlovsk) after a few months.

The Alapaevsk narrow-gauge railway serves the communities around Alapayevsk.

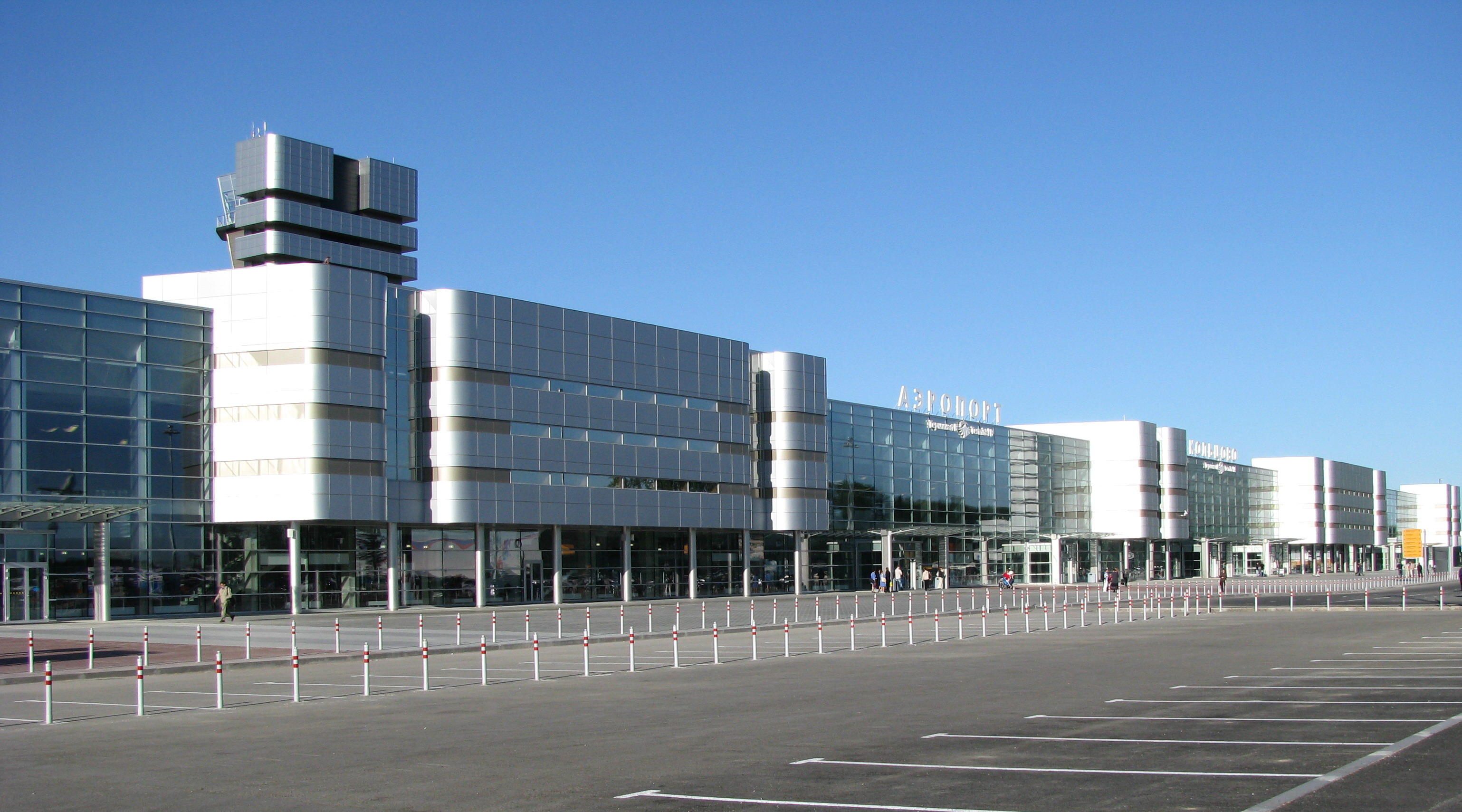
Koltsovo International Airport

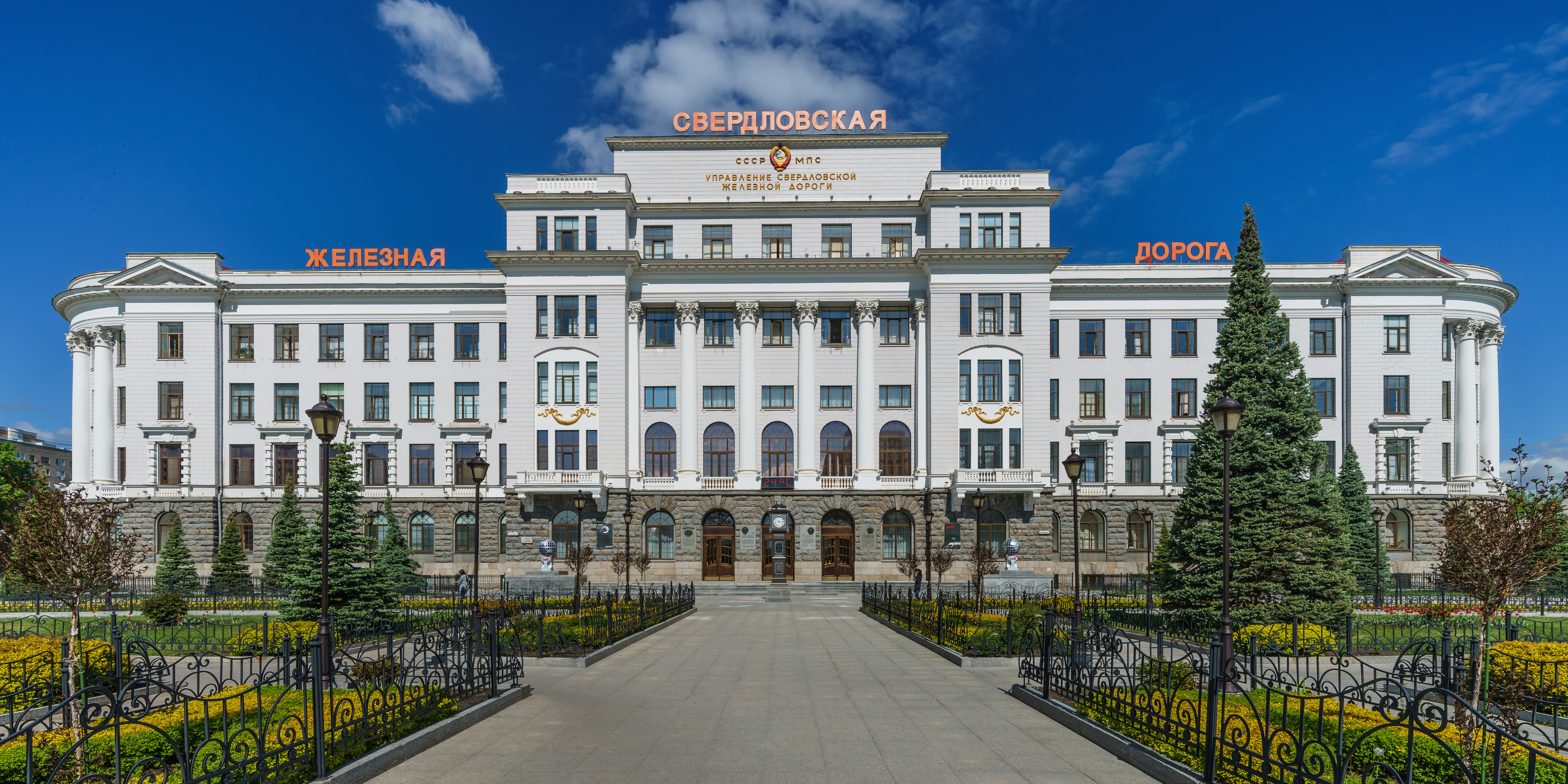
Main office of Sverdlovsk Railway

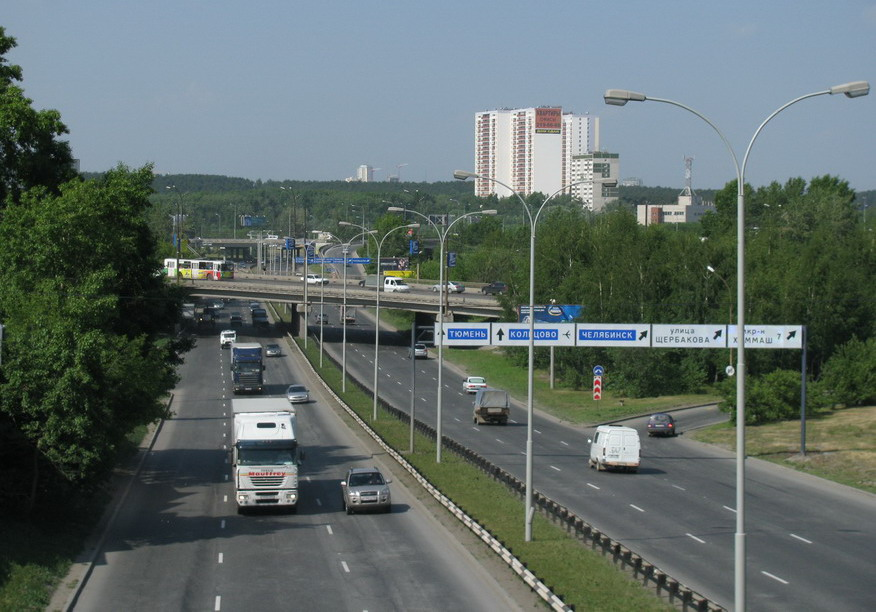
E22 bypass in the Yekaterinburg

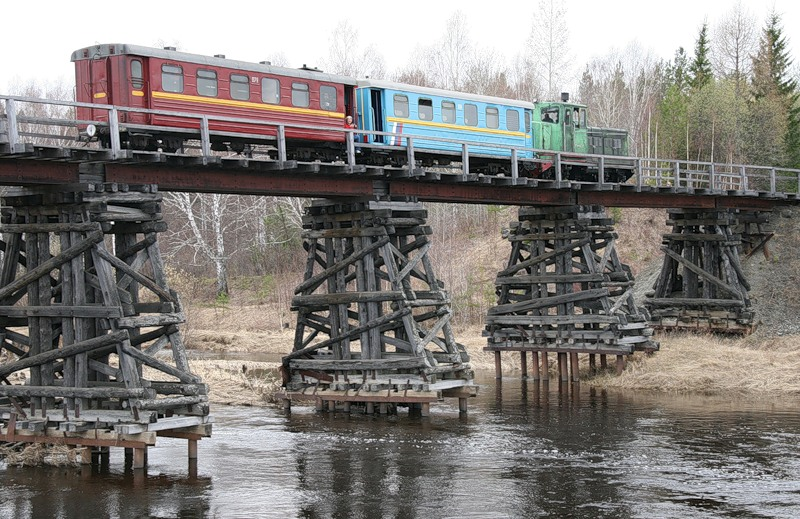
Alapaevsk narrow-gauge railway

== Sister relationships ==
- Bà Rịa–Vũng Tàu province, Vietnam
- Harbin, China

== Notable people ==
- Vladik Dzhabarov, Russian cyclist
- Andrey Fedyaev, Russian cosmonaut
- Boris Yeltsin, 1st president of Russia
- Sweetie Fox, Russian pornographic film actress

== See also ==
- Yakov Sverdlov, a communist revolutionary after whom Sverdlovsk and subsequently Sverdlovsk Oblast were named.
- Church of the Purification of the Blessed Virgin Mary, a building of regional historical significance in Staropyshminsk village.
- The Church of the Vernicle Image of the Saviour, a building of regional historical significance in Krasnogorskoye village.
- Church of Christ's Ascension, Golubkovskoe, a building of regional historical significance in Golubkovskoe village.
