= Vladik Dzhabarov =

Soviet cyclist

- Владик Джабаров
- Born: Sverdlovsk, USSR
- Military career
- Allegiance: USSR
- Service: Soviet Army
- Wars: Soviet–Afghan War

Vladik Dzhabarov (Russian: Владик Джабаров was a Soviet cyclist from Sverdlovsk. He joined the Soviet Army to fight in the Invasion of Afghanistan for two years, where he continued to keep up a relationship with his trainer, and was introduced to war correspondent Artyom Borovik.
